= Nikos Economopoulos =

Greek photographer (born 1953)

Nikos Economopoulos (Νίκος Οικονομόπουλος, Nikos Oikonomopoulos, born 1953) is a Greek photographer known for his photography of the Balkans and of Greece in particular.

== Life and career ==
Born on Kalamata, Economopoulos studied law at university and worked as a journalist.

Economopoulos only started taking photographs at 25 when a friend in Italy showed him a book of the work of Henri Cartier-Bresson, which had an impact that was both instant and lasting. Cartier-Bresson "showed me a new way to see things. . . . What I saw in his work was not only geometry and composition, but a kind of ambiguity."

Economopoulos recalls that even then he did not start photography for over two years but instead bought photography books. Then he started photography:

I never photographed sunrises or made souvenir pictures of my children. For about eight or nine years I photographed at weekends and during my holidays, always in a serious way, working from morning to night.

As early as 1984, Economopoulos says, "it bothered me ideologically that Greeks and Turks were enemies", and he visited Turkey to take photographs. "No Greek at that time would go to Turkey on holiday", he writes, and his Greek friends were incredulous; but Economopoulos quickly felt at home in Turkey, where the atmosphere "was exactly the same as when I was a kid in the 1960s." (Much later, he would add that Greece and western Turkey had replaced tavernas with McDonald's, while east Turkey still preserved the values of the past.)

In 1988, Economopoulos finished work as a journalist and set off on a two-year photographic survey of Greece and Turkey.

Economopoulos was encouraged to join Magnum Photos by the Greek-American photographer Costa Manos, and became an associate member in 1990 and, after his work in Albania, Bulgaria, Romania and the former Yugoslavia, a full member in 1994. His early work won him the 1992 Mother Jones Award for Documentary Photography.

In 1993, Frank Viviano, who had first met Economopoulos in Timișoara just after the fall of Nicolae Ceauşescu, wrote that:

Economopoulos says his intention is to document the existence of what he calls the "Balkan Man": to knit together the skeins of a collective identity in a region whose historical convulsions have made its name a synonym for implacable differences. It would appear to be a fool's errand. But almost anyone who has crossed the madman's web of frontiers and borders that stretches over the Balkans, from Istanbul to the Italian border, is likely to agree with Economopoulos's premise — and to recognize, in his work, the contradictions that sum up Balkan truth.

With support from the Little Brothers of the Poor, in 1994 Economopoulos photographed gypsies in Greece, and in 1995–96 lignite miners and Muslims in Greece. In 1997–98 he concentrated on people living on the "Green Line" separating Northern Cyprus, illegal migration across the Albanian–Greek border, and young people in Tokyo; and for the next two years Albanians fleeing Kosovo. He also worked on a commission from the University of the Aegean on storytelling in the region.

Economopoulos was dissatisfied with the assignment in Japan, as he felt unable to communicate with people and was just as estranged after three weeks of work as he had been on his arrival. By contrast, he writes that "I prefer to spend my time in my corner of the world, south Europe and west Asia, where I understand the codes and can make connections." This does not mean that the Balkans are an open book to him: Economopoulos has also written of the paradoxes apparent in Albania; and also across the Balkans, where faces can be sad even in wedding parties.

Economopoulos's photography of Turkey won him the 2001 Abdi İpekçi Award for promoting friendship between Turkey and Greece. Painfully aware of the bitterness often encouraged in both Greece and Turkey toward the other, he has written appreciatively of the personal welcome given to him by the Turks that he meets.

There are no real differences [between Greeks and Turks]. I love Turkey and I can live there. I can't live in Paris or in London. But Istanbul — I can live there.

Economopoulos said in 2001 that he preferred to sleep in his caravan when travelling around the Balkans and Turkey. He did not feel safe in his caravan in the Balkans, but did feel safe in Turkey.

Economopoulos's photographs have been published in The Guardian, The Independent, Le Monde, Libération, The New York Times, El País, and Die Zeit. He feels that there is no future in photojournalism. There is a loss of quality in photographs in newspapers, and Robert Capa would not take photographs if he were living today. But he concedes that Abbas and James Nachtwey are among those who disagree.

Platon Rivellis writes that:

In Economopoulos' photographs, a smile, a tilt of the head, an unusual leap, a look, from being insignificant details from the second level of everyday life are re-evaluated and transformed into major photographic events.

In 2002 Economopoulos and his family were living in Preveza; he is now (2010) living in Athens.

His work is in the permanent collections of Centre Méditerranéen de la Photographie (Corsica) and the Benaki Museum (Athens).

== Exhibitions by Economopoulos ==
=== Solo exhibitions ===
- "In the Balkans." Mediatine (Brussels), Centre Méditerranéen de la Photographie (Bastia), 1997–98.
- "Nikos Economopoulos, Magnum: Retrospective of 100 Photographs, '79–99." Hellenic American Union, 1999.
- "Apo mēchanēs choros" (Από μηχανής χορός) / "Dance ex machina." Technopolis (Gazi, Athens), 2000.
- "La mia Grecia". Museo Castello Ducale (Corigliano Calabro, Italy), 2004.
- "Economopoulos - photographer". Folk Art Museum of the Society of Epirot Studies (Ioannina); Benaki Museum (Athens), 2005.
- "In the Balkans." İstanbul Fotoğraf Merkezi (Istanbul), 2007.
- "Nikos Economopoulos." Evagoras Lanitis Centre (Limassol), 2008–2009.
- "Nikos Economopoulos, Photographe". Maison de la photographie Robert Doisneau (Gentilly), 2009–2010.

=== Group exhibitions ===
- "NorthSouthEastWest: A 360° View of Climate Change". (With other Magnum photographers.) Science Museum (London), March 2005; and many cities worldwide until 2006.
- "Periplus: 12 Magnum Photographers in Contemporary Greece." Onassis Cultural Center (Manhattan); Museum of Photography Thessaloniki (Thessaloniki); Benaki Museum (Athens); (as "Periplus - Fotografische Reisewege im heutigen Griechenland") Willy-Brandt-Haus (Berlin); Jin Tai Art Museum (Beijing); all 2004.
- "Mediterranea." Provincial library of Bari (Bari), 2005–2006.
- "Turkey by Magnum." Istanbul Modern (Istanbul), 2007.
- "L'humain dans les collections du Centre Méditerranéen de la Photographie." Centre Culturel Una Volta (Bastia), 2007. Théâtre de Propriano (Propriano), 2009.

=== As director/curator ===
- "City Streets." National Bank of Greece Cultural Foundation (Athens), 2007–2008; National Bank of Greece Cultural Foundation (Thessaloniki), 2008; European Parliament (Brussels), 2008; SantralIstanbul (Istanbul), 2008. Athens International Airport, 2009.

== Books by Economopoulos ==
- In the Balkans. New York: Abrams, 1995. ISBN 0-8109-3469-8. (in English)
- Valkania (Βαλκάνια). Athens: Libro, 1995. ISBN 960-7009-99-1. (in Greek)
- Balkanlarda. Istanbul: Fotoğrafevi, 2007. ISBN 978-975-00898-9-3. (in Turkish)
- Lignitōrychoi (Λιγνιτόρυχοι) / Lignite Miners. Athens: Indiktos, 1998. ISBN 960-518-048-0. (in English and Greek)
- Magnum: 100 Fotografies 1979–1999 (Magnum - 100 Φωτογραφίες 1979-1999). Athens: Hellenic American Union, 1999. (in Greek)
- Apo mēchanēs choros (Από μηχανής χορός). Athens: Diphōno, 2000. ISBN 960-86640-1-2. ISBN 960-86640-0-4. (in Greek) The title means "Dance ex machina".
- About Children / Gia ta paidia (Για τα παιδιά). Athens: Metaichmio, 2001. ISBN 960-375-177-4. (in English and Greek)
- Economopoulos, photographer / Οικονομόπουλος, φωτογράφος. Athens: Metaichmio, 2002. ISBN 960-375-121-9. (in Greek and English) A survey of Economopoulos's work.
- Kokkinē klōstē klōsmenē: Laïka paramythia kai aphēgētes tou Aigaiou (Κόκκινη κλωστή κλωσμένη - Λαϊκά παραμύθια και αφηγητές του Αιγαίου). Text by Marianthē Kaplanoglou. Athens: Ekdoseis Patakē, 2004. ISBN 960-16-1325-0 (in Greek) The title means "Red thread snapped: Folk tales and narrators of the Aegean."

== Books with contributions by Economopoulos ==
- Magnum Cinema: Photographs from 50 Years of Movie-Making. London: Phaidon, 1995. ISBN 0-7148-3375-4. London: Phaidon, 2001. ISBN 0-7148-3772-5. (in English)
  - Magnum Cinema: ein halbes Jahrhundert Kino in Magnum-Photographien. München: Schirmer/Mosel, 1994. ISBN 3-88814-744-1. München: Schirmer/Mosel, 1996. ISBN 3-88814-799-9. (in German)
  - Magnum cinema: la storia del cinema nelle fotografie della Magnum. Milano: Mondadori, 1994. ISBN 88-04-39148-0. (in Italian)
  - Magnum cinema: des histories de cinéma par les photographes de Magnum. Paris: Cahiers du Cinéma, 1994. ISBN 2-86642-153-1. (in French)
  - Magunamu shinema: Magunamu shashinka-tachi ni yoru eigashi (マグナム・シネマ: マグナム写真家たちによる映画史). Tokyo: Kinema Junpō-sha, 1995. ISBN 4-87376-131-X. (in Japanese)
- Tōkyō (東京) / Tokyo. Today. Tokyo: EU Japan Fest Japan Committee, 1996. (in Japanese and English) Photographs by Economopoulos on pp. 21, 36, 37.
- Thrakē: Terra incognita / Thrace: Terra Incognita. Rodos: Rodos Image, 1997. ISBN 960-90194-4-7. (in Greek and English) Photographs by Tassos Vrettos, Nikos Kasseris, and Economopoulos; texts by Yiannis Panoussis and Manos Stephanidis.
- Magnum° (also called Magnum Degrees). London: Phaidon, 2000. ISBN 0-7148-3821-7. (in English) Photographs from the Balkans on pp. 43, 100–17, 196–97.
  - Magnum°. Phaidon. ISBN 0-7148-9784-1. (in Spanish)
  - Magnum°. Phaidon. ISBN 0-7148-9077-4. (in German)
  - Magnum°. Phaidon. ISBN 0-7148-9065-0 (hard). ISBN 0-7148-9450-8 (paper). (in French)
  - Magnum°. Phaidon. ISBN 0-7148-9792-2. (in Italian)
- Magnum Football (distributed in the US as Magnum Soccer). London: Phaidon, 2002. ISBN 0-7148-4236-2. London: Phaidon, 2005. ISBN 0-7148-4521-3. With other Magnum photographers.
  - Magnum Football. Phaidon. ISBN 0-7148-9328-5. (in French)
  - Magnum Fußball. Phaidon. ISBN 0-7148-9337-4 (hardback). ISBN 0-7148-5797-1 (paperback). (in German)
  - Magnum Calcio. Phaidon. ISBN 0-7148-9788-4. (in Italian)
  - Magnum Fútbol. Phaidon. ISBN 0-7148-9775-2. (in Spanish)
  - Magunamu sakkā (マグナムサッカー). Tokyo: Phaidon, 2006. ISBN 4-902593-37-8. (in Japanese)
- Periplous, 12 photographoi tou Manknoum stē synchronē Hellada / Periplus, 12 Magnum Photographers in Contemporary Greece. Athens: Organismos Provolēs Hellēnikou Politismou-Politistikē Olympiada, 2004. ISBN 960-8276-14-4. (in Greek and English)
- Magnum Stories. London: Phaidon, 2004. ISBN 0-7148-4245-1. (in English) Pp. 130–37 are devoted to Economopoulos: he introduces a selection of his photography (1988–99) in Turkey.
- Magunamu ga totta Tōkyō (マグナムが撮った東京) / Tokyo Seen by Magnum Photographers. Tokyo: Magnum Photos Tokyo, 2007. (in Japanese and English) Plates 70 and 71 are by Economopoulos.
- Magnum Magnum: with 413 photographs in colour and duotone, ed. Brigitte Lardinois. London: Thames & Hudson, 2007. ISBN 978-0-500-54342-9. London: Thames & Hudson, 2008. ISBN 0-500-54366-6. A selection by Paolo Pellegrin of Economopoulos' photographs appears on pp. 144–49; elsewhere, Economopoulos presents his selection of photographs by David Alan Harvey. (in English)
  - Magnum Magnum: con 413 fotografías en color y en blanco y negro. Barcelona: Lunwerg, 2007. ISBN 84-9785-333-4. (in Spanish)
  - Magnum Magnum: met 413 foto's in kleur en duotoon. Tielt: Lannoo; Bussum: Thoth, 2007. ISBN 90-5996-021-1. Tielt: Lannoo; Bussum: Thoth, 2009. ISBN 90-5996-041-6. (in Dutch)
  - Magnum Magnum. Paris: La Martinière, 2007. ISBN 2-7324-3652-6. (in French)
  - Magnum Magnum. München: Schirmer Mosel, 2007. ISBN 3-8296-0323-1. (in German)
  - Magunamu Magunamu (マグナム・マグナム) / Magnum Magnum. Kyoto: Seigensha, 2007. ISBN 4-86152-113-0. Kyoto: Seigensha, 2009. ISBN 4-86152-201-3. (in Japanese)
- City Streets / Hoi dromoi tēs polēs (Οι δρόμοι της πόλης). Athens: Morphōtiko Hidryma Ethnikēs Trapezēs, 2007. ISBN 960-250-379-3. Economopoulos was editor of the content (and teacher of the contributors). (in English and Greek)
