= Bruce Gilden =

American street photographer (born 1946)

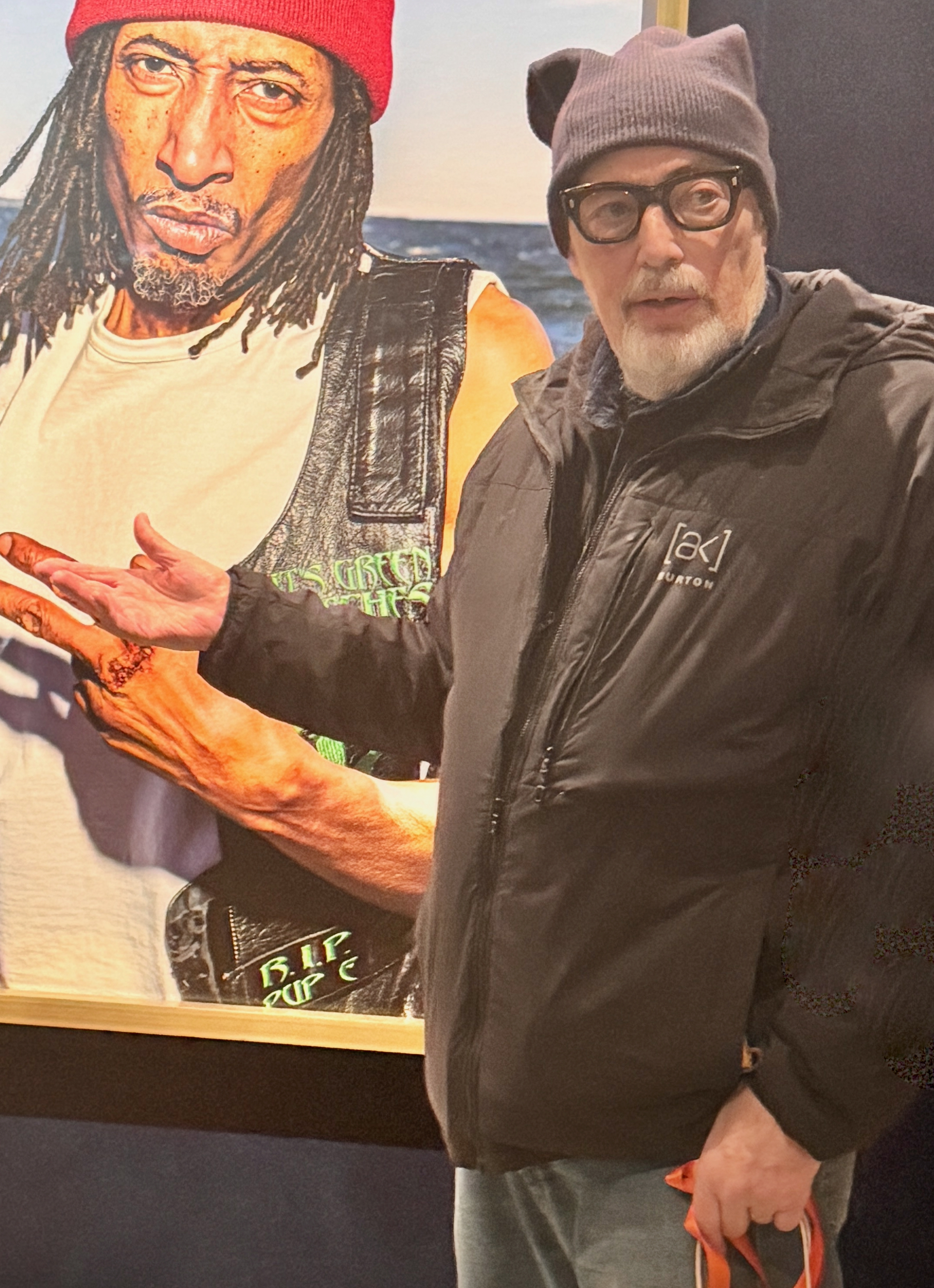
- Bruce Gilden explaining his artwork at the Pinacoteca Tosio Martinengo in Brescia (2026)
- Born: 1946 (age 79–80); Brooklyn, New York, U.S.
- Education: Penn State (sociology); School of Visual Arts (photography)
- Occupations: Street photographer; filmmaker
- Awards: European Publishers Award for Photography (1996); Guggenheim Fellowship (2013)
- Website: brucegilden.com

Bruce Gilden (born 1946) is an American street photographer. He is best known for his candid close-up photographs of people on the streets of New York City, using a flashgun. He has had various books of his work published, has received the European Publishers Award for Photography and is a Guggenheim Fellow. Gilden has been a member of Magnum Photos since 1998. He was born in Brooklyn, New York.

== Life and work ==
Gilden was born in Brooklyn, New York. While studying sociology at Penn State, he saw Michelangelo Antonioni's film Blowup in 1968. Influenced by the film, he purchased his first camera and began taking night classes in photography at the School of Visual Arts of New York. Fascinated with people on the street and the idea of visual spontaneity, Gilden turned to a career in photography. His work is characterized by his use of flash photography. He has worked in black and white most of his life, but he began shooting in color and digital when he was introduced to the Leica S camera as part of Magnum's Postcards From America project. Gilden has been a member of Magnum Photos since 1998.

His first major project was of people at Coney Island. He has photographed people on the streets of New York, Japan's yakuza mobsters, homeless people, prostitutes, and members of bike gangs between 1995 and 2000. According to Gilden, he was fascinated by the duality and double lives of the individuals he photographed. He has also photographed rural Ireland and horseracing there, as well as voodoo rituals in Haiti.

Gilden is the subject of the documentary film Misery Loves Company: The Life and Death of Bruce Gilden (2007).

== Reception ==
Gilden has described the way he photographs as "flash in one hand and jumping at people". Sean O'Hagan, reviewing Gilden's Face (2015) in The Guardian wrote that "his style seems to work against any intention to humanise his subjects." Contemporary American photographer Joel Meyerowitz has this to say about Gilden: "He's a fucking bully. I despise the work, I despise the attitude, he's an aggressive bully and all the pictures look alike because he only has one idea—'I'm gonna embarrass you, I'm going to humiliate you.' I'm sorry, but no."

== Publications ==
=== Publications by Gilden ===
- The Small Haiti Portfolio (Limited Edition), Helsinki, Finland, 1990.
- Facing New York, Manchester, UK: Cornerhouse Publications, 1992. ISBN 978-0-948797-07-1. Published in conjunction with an exhibition at the Chrysler Museum of Art, Norfolk, VA.
- Bleus, Mission Photographique Transmanche (Cross Channel Photographic Mission) no. 13. Douchy-les-Mines, France: Centre Régional de la Photographie (CRP) (Regional Centre for Photography), Nord Pas-de-Calais, 1994.
- Haïti, Dreams and Nightmares. Stockport, UK: Dewi Lewis and Paris: Marval, 1997.
- After the Off. Stockport, UK: Dewi Lewis, 1999. ISBN 978-1-899235-17-9. Photographs by Gilden, short story by Dermot Healy.
- Ciganos. Lisbon, Portugal: Centro Portuguès de Fotografia, 1999.
- Haiti. Stockport, UK: Dewi Lewis and Paris: Marval, 1999. ISBN 978-1-899235-55-1.
- Go. London: Trebruk and New York: Magnum Photos, 2000. ISBN 978-0-9538901-0-1.
- Coney Island. London: Trebruk, 2002. ISBN 978-0-9538901-2-5.
- A Beautiful Catastrophe. Brooklyn, NY: Powerhouse, 2005. ISBN 978-1-57687-238-3.
- Fashion Magazine. Paris: Magnum Photos, 2006. ISBN 978-1-933045-43-6. With text contributions by Hedi Slimane, Viktor & Rolf, Azzedine Alaïa, Ingrid Sischy, Bob Colacello and Francesco Vezzoli. In English and French.
- Bruce Gilden. Stern Portfolio No.64. Krefeld, Germany: teNeues, 2011. ISBN 978-3-652-00005-5.
- Foreclosures. London: Browns, 2013. ISBN 978-0-9565324-8-0. Available in standard edition (edition of 400) and slipcase edition (edition of 100).
- A Complete Examination of Middlesex. 2013. London: Archive of Modern Conflict. ISBN 978-0-9570490-5-5.
- Bruce Gilden. Photofile series. London: Thames & Hudson, 2014. ISBN 978-0-500-41110-0.
- Bruce Gilden. Photo Poche series. Arles, France: Actes Sud, 2014. ISBN 978-2-330-01962-4. Preface by Hans-Michael Koetzle. French-language version.
- Moscow Terminus. New York: Dashwood Books, 2014. Edition of 1000 copies.
- Face. Stockport, UK: Dewi Lewis, 2015. ISBN 978-1-907893-75-9. With a text by Chris Klatell.
- Hey Mister, Throw me Some Beads!. Heidelberg, Germany: Kehrer, 2015. ISBN 978-3-86828-608-3.
- Un Nouveau Regard Sur La Mobilité Urbaine. Paris: La Martinière and RATP, 2015. ISBN 978-2-7324-7595-0.
- Syracuse, 1981. Tokyo: Super Labo, 2018. Edition of 1000 copies.
- Only God Can Judge Me. London: Browns, 2018. ISBN 978-0-9928194-7-7. Edition of 700 copies.
- Palermo Gilden. Palermo, Sicily: 89books, 2020. Edition of 89 copies. ISBN 978-88-944092-5-3.
- Black Country. Setanta, 2022.
- The Circuit. Dewi Lewis, 2022. ISBN 978-1-911306-91-7.
- One Night Only. Setanta, 2023. ISBN 978-1-915652-08-9.
- Made in the USA. Super Labo, 2024.

=== Publications with contributions by Gilden ===
- Magnum Stories. London: Phaidon, 2004. ISBN 978-0-7148-6503-4. Edited by Chris Boot.
- Mirror Mirror: Portugal as seen by Magnum Photographers. Göttingen: Steidl, 2005. ISBN 978-3-86521-148-4. Photographs by Bruno Barbey, Henri Cartier-Bresson, Thomas Hoepker, Jean Gaumy, Gilden, Josef Koudelka, Guy Le Querrec, Susan Meiselas, Inge Morath, Martin Parr, Gilles Peress, Gueorgui Pinkhassov and Miguel Rio Branco.
- Coney Island. Paris: Trans Photographic, 2009. ISBN 978-2-913176-64-5. Photographs by Johnny Miller and Baptiste Lignel. Text by Sophie Gilden and Bruce Gilden.
- Street Photography Now. London: Thames & Hudson, 2010. ISBN 978-0-500-54393-1. Edited by Sophie Howarth and Stephen McLaren.
- Magnum Contact Sheets. London: Thames & Hudson, 2011. ISBN 978-0-500-54412-9.
- Magnum Contact Sheets. Edited by Kristen Lubben.
  - Magnum Contact Sheets. London: Thames & Hudson, 2011. ISBN 978-0-500-54412-9.
  - Magnum Contact Sheets. London: Thames & Hudson, 2014. ISBN 978-0-500-54431-0. Compact edition.
  - Magnum Contact Sheets: The Collector's Edition: Bruce Gilden, Yakuza, 1998. London: Thames & Hudson, 2011. ISBN 978-0-500-54412-9.

== Awards ==
- 1979: Artist's Fellowship, New York Foundation for the Arts, New York.
- 1980: Photographer's Fellowship, National Endowment for the Arts.
- 1984: Photographer's Fellowship, National Endowment for the Arts.
- 1984: Artist's Fellowship, New York Foundation for the Arts, New York.
- 1992: Photographer's Fellowship, National Endowment for the Arts.
- 1992: Artist's Fellowship, New York Foundation for the Arts, New York.
- 1995: Villa Medicis Hors les Murs (an artist's fellowship), from Institut Français.
- 1996: European Publishers Award for Photography for Haiti.
- 1999: Artist's Fellowship, from the Japan Foundation, for Tokyo Extremes.
- 2000: Artist's Fellowship, New York Foundation for the Arts, New York.
- 2013: Guggenheim Fellowship from the John Simon Guggenheim Memorial Foundation.

== Exhibitions ==
- 2024: Why These?, Fotografiska New York
- 2024: Why These?, Fotografiska, Stockholm
- 2025: Versicherungskammer Kulturstiftung, Munich.
- 2025: Why These?, Fotografiska Tallinn

== Collections ==
Gilden's work is held in the following collections:

- Tokyo Metropolitan Museum of Photography, Tokyo, Japan.
- Victoria and Albert Museum, London.
