= Bob Henriques =

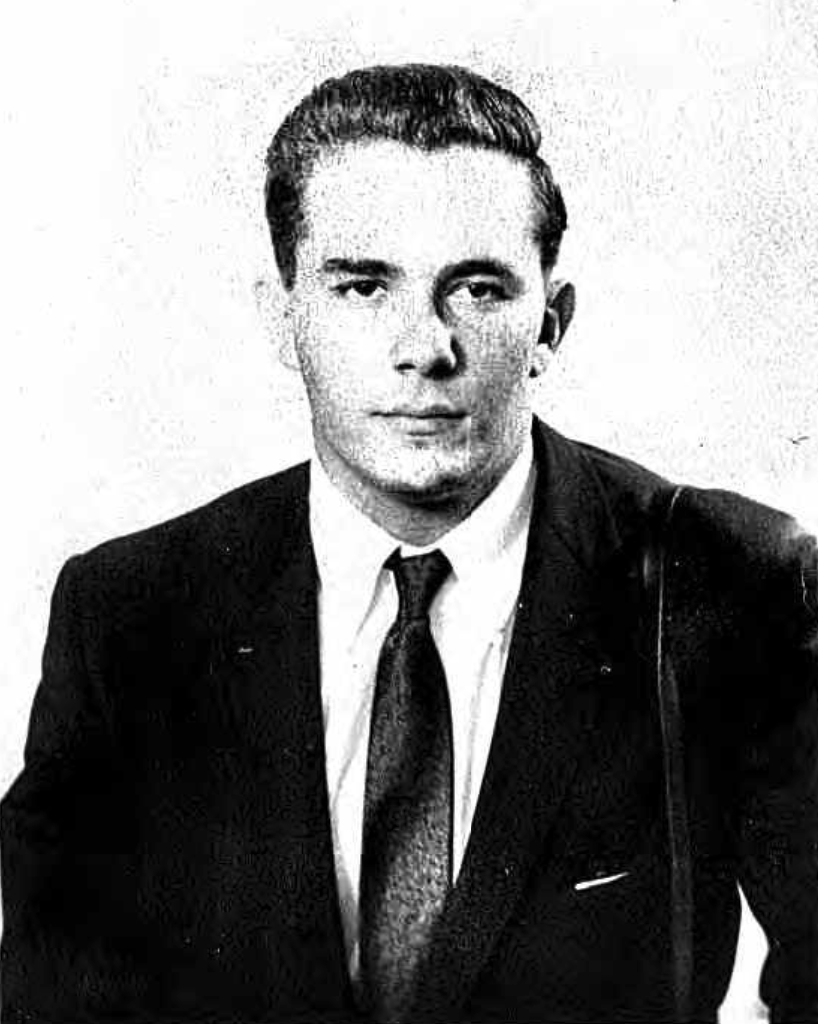
- Bob Henriques in 1958
- Born: Robert Granville Henriques; February 1, 1930; New York City, New York
- Died: 2011
- Occupation: Photojournalist
- Spouse: Marjorie Eulalee Henriques
- Parents: Launcelot Granville Black Henriques (father); Thelma Pearla Veronica Henriques (mother)

Bob Henriques (1930–2011) was an American photojournalist who was active in the 1950s and early 1960s. He was an Associate of Magnum Photos, and a free-lance photographer for Life Magazine. He is best known for his photos of movie stars, particularly Marilyn Monroe, the civil rights movement of the early 1960s, and the Cuban Revolution.

== Photojournalism career ==
As early as 1950, when he was only 20 years old, Henriques began selling pictures of New York City street scenes, and Coney Island amusements. On Election Day 1952 he photographed Dwight D. Eisenhower as he won the U.S. Presidency from Adlai Stevenson. In this early commercial work he was associated with PIX Publishing, a photo agency. These photos are still available for sale from Getty Images. He affiliated with Magnum Photos in 1954.

=== Movie photography ===
In 1954 Henriques began working on the set of The Seven Year Itch which was filming in New York City. He developed a relationship with Marilyn Monroe who allowed him to photograph her in both formal and casual settings. Due to Monroe's worldwide popularity, these photos are among the most recognizable images that Henriques ever captured. Henriques not only photographed her on location, but also at Yankee Stadium, Ebbets Field, at social functions, and in her apartment in New York. The relationship lasted well beyond the filming, and Henriques photographed Monroe as late as the premier of Some Like It Hot in 1959.

In September 1959 Henriques covered Nikita Khrushchev's visit to the United States. This included a trip to Hollywood, where Khrushchev visited the set of Can-Can. Henriques captured an image of Shirley MacLaine caressing Khrushchev on the forehead. Henriques was also accredited to cover Khrushchev's visit with President Eisenhower at Camp David and he captured images of the two leaders in vigorous conversation.

In 1961 Henriques worked on the set of Long Day's Journey Into Night which was filming in New York City. This effort produced a number of notable pictures of Katharine Hepburn, including her portrait in Life magazine.

=== Civil rights photography ===
On May 17, 1957 Martin Luther King, Jr. spoke to a crowd of more than 22,000 people from the front of the Lincoln Memorial in Washington, D.C. This event was known as the Prayer Pilgrimage for Freedom. Henriques was on the podium, behind King, as he delivered his "Give Us The Ballot" speech to what was then the largest civil rights audience ever assembled in America. The images he captured at this event are among his most widely published. One of them was chosen for the inside front cover of Life Magazine's fiftieth anniversary tribute to King in 2018. In 2020 Magnum produced "Solidarity", a special print sale to benefit the NAACP and one of Henriques' photos from the Prayer Pilgrimage was part of the collection.

Henriques photographed Malcolm X during a civil rights protest in New York City in 1963. One of these photos was published by Essence in a 2020 reconsideration of Malcolm X's legacy on the fifty-fifth anniversary of his assassination.

=== Cuban revolution ===
Henriques and fellow Magnum photographer Burt Glinn arrived in Cuba just as Fidel Castro's forces closed in on Havana in January 1959. They shared a car out of Havana to make contact with the approaching rebels and documented their rise to power. Henriques captured images of a cigar-chomping Castro, his first press conference as prime minister, and pitching at a baseball game. His photo of Castro and his supporters led a 1963 New York Times Magazine essay on Cuba by Senator George McGovern.

Henriques returned to Cuba in 1961 to cover the aftermath of the Bay of Pigs invasion. He captured several images of Fidel Castro inspecting wreckage on the battlefield. He also reported on the Castro government's literacy program.

He maintained relations with sources in Cuba and was interviewed by the Central Intelligence Agency in 1964 regarding the Movimiento Democrata Cristiano, an anti-Castro organization on the island.

=== Other projects ===
Henriques is credited with several record album cover photos:

- Soliloquy by Erroll Garner released in 1957
- Drums of Passion by Olatunji! released in 1960
- The Brothers Four by The Brothers Four released in 1960
- Brubeck on Campus by The Dave Brubeck Quartet released in 1972
- Bossa Nova U.S.A. by The Dave Brubeck Quartet released in 1963. Henriques' cover art is a shot from above of Dave Brubeck lying across the front seat of a convertible.

His photos have appeared in several books including:

- Marilyn by Magnum, by Gerry Badger
- The Fifties: Photographs of America, by Eve Arnold
- Marilyn: A Biography, by Norman Mailer
- Free at Last: A History of the Civil Rights Movement and those Who Died in the Struggle, by Sara Bullard
- All The People: Since 1945, by Joy Hakim
- Dance For Export, by Naima Prevots
- Che Guevara, by David Sandison

Henriques' photographed a number of important political figures. His portrait of Senator Robert F. Kennedy appeared on the inside front cover of Life Magazine's Robert F. Kennedy, An American Legacy published in 2018 to commemorate the fiftieth anniversary of the assassination. He photographed then Senator John F. Kennedy campaigning for the presidency in 1960.

His work for Life Magazine included photos for articles on corruption in New York State, gangs in New York City, an abortive effort by the Cuban government to overthrow dictator Rafael Trujillo of the Dominican Republic, and organized crime in the United States.

He photographed a number of other notables for other projects including authors Margaret Case Harriman, Jay Richard Kennedy, and Cameron Hawley, evangelist Billy Graham, Mohawk activist Kahn-Tineta Horn, and Marian Javits.

== Fine-art shows ==
While his focus was photojournalism, Henriques' work has been recognized as fine art and been exhibited in a number of museum shows. Among those were:

- "Life as Legend" a Marilyn Monroe retrospective that appeared at the Boca Raton Museum of Art and the Dayton Art Institute in 2007
- "Marilyn: Legende, Mythos und Ikone" at the Kunsthaus in Hamburg, Germany, in 2006
- "50 años sin Marilyn" at the University of Huelva, in Huelva, Spain in 2012
- "I Wanna be Loved by You: Photographs of Marilyn Monroe" at the Bass Museum of Art in Miami Beach in 2006
- "Protest!" a selection of Magnum photographs of protest at the Milk Gallery in New York in 2017
- "Magnum Style" at the Staley-Wise Gallery in 2004
- In 2009 his work was included in an exhibition at the Magnum Print Room in London to consider the fiftieth anniversary of the Cuban revolution
- "Planet Football" at the Cinémathèque québécoise in Montreal

A box of Henriques' photos is part of the Magnum Photos, Inc. archive housed at the Harry Ransom Center at the University of Texas at Austin.

== Personal life ==
Henriques was born in New York City, New York on February 1, 1930. He was the only child of Granville and Pearl Henriques, who were immigrants from Jamaica. During his years as a photojournalist he lived in New York City.

He was married to Marjorie Eulalee Henriques in 1965. She was born on January 24, 1935, in Jamaica and naturalized as an American citizen in 1990. She died on June 4, 2008, in Homestead, Florida.

Henriques gave up photojournalism in the mid-1960s. He went on to run a candle manufacturing business in Jamaica, but lived in Homestead, Florida. He died there in 2011.

He was the godfather of American author Kyle Roderick.
