= Michael Christopher Brown =

American photographer (born 1978)

- Born: United States
- Occupation: photographer
- Years active: 2005–present
- Website: www.michaelchristopherbrown.com

Michael Christopher Brown (born December 18, 1978) is an American photographer known for his documentation of the 2011 Libyan Civil War and the resulting monograph, Libyan Sugar (2016).

== Career ==
Brown was raised in the Skagit Valley, a farming community in Washington. After moving to New York City in 2005, he joined the Italian photo agency Grazia Neri in 2006. He then moved to Beijing, China, in 2009 and over the next two years put together a series of works from road and train trips across the country.

In 2010 Brown began taking pictures with an iPhone, driving around eastern China in his Jinbei van. Since then he produced iPhone photographs in Libya, Egypt, Congo (DRC), Central African Republic, Cuba and Palestine. Brown's ability to capture critical moments with an iPhone has led to his involvement with Time, The New York Times Magazine, and National Geographic's Instagram platforms. Through these platforms he is able to reach millions of followers to inform and educate on social and political issues in remote and under-reported areas of the world.

In 2011, Brown spent seven months in Libya photographing the Libyan Revolution, exploring ethical distance and the iconography of warfare. He covered several battles along the coast, was ambushed several times in Eastern Libya and injured twice. In early March, on the frontline near the eastern town of Bin Jawad, he was shot in the leg by an AK-47 during a Government offensive. Six weeks later, while covering the Siege of Misrata, he was injured by incoming mortar fire and took four pieces of shrapnel to the chest, shoulder and arm, losing nearly half the blood in his body and requiring two transfusions. His colleagues Tim Hetherington and Chris Hondros were both killed in the same attack. Brown returned to Libya twice in 2012 and was the subject of the Michael Mann directed HBO documentary series Witness: Libya. In March 2012 Brown and Men's Journal writer Josh Davis were briefly kidnapped at gunpoint while covering a drifting event in Benghazi.

Brown has documented conflict in and around the Kivu provinces of the Democratic Republic of the Congo since 2012 and was based in Goma from late 2012 until early 2014.

A contributing photographer at National Geographic since 2005, where he has completed adventure and cultural stories, Brown is also a contributor to The New York Times Magazine and other publications. Since 2006 his photographs have been published in dozens of international publications. He joined Magnum Photos as a nominee in 2013 and was an associate from 2015 until leaving the agency in June 2017.

Brown's book Libyan Sugar won the Paris Photo First Photobook Award and the International Center of Photography's 2017 Infinity Award for Artist's Book.

In 2015 and 2016 Brown produced Paradiso, a multimedia project on the electronica music and youth scene in Havana, Cuba, part of which was exhibited in 2017 during the Cuba IS show at the Annenberg Space for Photography.

In 2018 Brown released the book Yo Soy Fidel, which follows the cortège of Fidel Castro, former Cuban revolutionary and politician, over a period of several days in late 2016.

== Publications ==
=== Publications by Brown ===
- Libyan Sugar. Santa Fe, NM: Twin Palms, 2016. Second edition, 2017. ISBN 978-1936611096.
- Yo Soy Fidel. Bologna, Italy. Damiani, 2018. ISBN 978-8862086028.

=== Publications with contributions by Brown ===
- Simply Beautiful. Washington, D.C.: National Geographic Society, 2010.
- iPhone Photographers. Washington, D.C.: National Geographic Society, 2012.
- National Geographic – Around the World in 125 Years. Cologne: Taschen, 2013.
- The Photographer's Playbook: 307 Assignments and Ideas. New York: Aperture, 2014. ISBN 978-1-59711-247-5. Edited by Gregory Halpern and Jason Fulford.
- Odyssee Europa. Magnum Photos; Zeitenspiegel-Reportageschule Günter Dahl, 2015.
- Prix Pictet Disorder. Kempen, Germany: teNeues, 2015.
- Magnum Photobook: The Catalogue Raisonne. Phaidon, 2017.
- Magnum Manifesto. Thames & Hudson, 2017.
- Magnum Atlas. Prestel. 2017.
- Magnum China. Thames & Hudson, 2018.

== Films ==
- HBO Witness: Libya (2012) – 56 minute HBO documentary about Brown, directed by Abdallah Omeish and executive produced by Michael Mann and David Frankham. Includes appearance by and film contributions from Brown.
- Which Way Is the Front Line from Here? The Life and Time of Tim Hetherington (2013) – 1 hour 18 minute documentary directed by Sebastian Junger. Includes Libya footage by Brown.
- The Prosecutors (2014) – documentary directed and produced by Leslie Thomas. Includes footage by Brown produced for the film in the Democratic Republic of Congo.
- Libyan Sugar (2015) – short film, directed/produced/filmed by Brown and produced by Liza Faktor.
- Paradiso (2015/2016) – short films on the electronica music and youth scene in Havana, Cuba. Some of these were exhibited in 2017 during the Cuba IS show at the Annenberg Space for Photography.
- Hondros (2017) – directed by Greg Campbell. Includes Libya footage by Brown.
- This is Congo (2017) – directed by Daniel McCabe. Includes footage by Brown produced for the film in the Democratic Republic of Congo.

== Exhibitions ==
- Simply Beautiful, Steven Kasher Gallery, New York City, 2010. Photographs from the National Geographic Image Collection.
- Revolution(s), Instituto Cervantes, New York City, 2011
- War/Photography: Image of Armed Conflict and its Aftermath, Museum of Fine Arts, Houston; Annenberg Space for Photography, Los Angeles, CA; Brooklyn Museum of Art, Brooklyn, New York, 2012–2014.
- ¡Cuba, Cuba!: 65 Years of Photography, organised by the International Center of Photography at Southampton Arts Center, New York City, 2015
- Failing Leviathan: Magnum Photographers and Civil War, The National Civil War Centre, Newark, UK, 2015. Curated by Julian Stallabrass.
- Odyssee Europa, Exile and refuge since 1945, Zeitenspiegel-Reportageschule Günter Dahl, Weinstadt, Germany, 2015. Photographs by Magnum photographers.
- Just Kids, Pop up home, UK, 2017
- Magnum Manifesto, International Center of Photography, New York City, 2017
- Cuba IS, Annenberg Space for Photography, Los Angeles, 2017
- Yo Soy Fidel, Rencontres d'Arles, Arles, France, 2018
- Je Mange Donc Je Suis, Musée de l'Homme, Paris, 2019
- This is Cuba, Royal Holloway, University of London, London, 2019
- Michael Christopher Brown, Galleria d'Arte Moderna Le Ciminiere, Sicily, 2020
