= Burt Glinn =

American photographer

- Burt Glinn
- Born: Burton Samuel Glinn; July 23, 1925; Pittsburgh, Pennsylvania, United States
- Died: April 9, 2008 (aged 82); Southampton, New York, United States
- Education: Harvard University

Burton Samuel Glinn (July 23, 1925 – April 9, 2008) was an American professional photographer who worked with Magnum Photos. He covered revolutionary leader Fidel Castro's entrance into Havana, Cuba, and photographed people such as Andy Warhol and Helen Frankenthaler. Glinn's photos show such things as the social scene of the rich, the dirtiness of politics, and the humorous flotilla that called itself the Seattle Tubing Society. He was also a contributor to Holiday.

== Early life ==
Glinn, a Pittsburgh native, studied literature at Harvard University, where he edited and photographed for the college newspaper Harvard Crimson. He served in the US Army and worked for Life magazine from 1949 to 1950. Glinn became an associate member of Magnum Photos in 1951 along with Eve Arnold and Dennis Stock - the first Americans to join the agency - and became a full member in 1954.

== Career ==
Glinn became famous for his color pictures of the South Seas, Japan, Russia, Mexico, and California. At a New Year's party in 1958, Glinn was notified that Fidel Castro had taken over Cuba. By dawn the next day he was covering the revolution in Cuba, making photographs "as everybody got whatever weapon they could get their hands on," he once said. In 1959 the photographer received the Mathew Brady Award for Magazine Photographer of the Year, offered by the University of Missouri for a photo essay on the South Seas.

He was president of Magnum from 1972 to 1975 (then re-elected to the position in 1987) and also served as president of the American Society of Media Photographers. He covered the Sinai War as well as the US Marine invasion of Lebanon and also completed a photo essay project on medical science. His images have been published in Esquire, Fortune, Geo, Life, Travel and Leisure, and Paris-Match.

When asked in an interview which of his images he most closely identifies with, Glinn replied that without a doubt it is the picture showing the back of Nikita Khrushchev's head in front of the Lincoln Memorial:

I was late and I couldn’t get to where everybody else was, in front of Khrushchev, so I came running up and I was in the back of him. And I looked up and there it was. I got two shots of that and then it disintegrated. If I’d been on time I would have gotten a very ordinary picture of Khrushchev and Henry Cabot Lodge looking at this statue of Lincoln but you couldn’t see the statue. The most important thing that a photographer like me can have is luck, you know.

== Death ==
Burt Glinn died on April 9, 2008, in Southampton, New York, aged 82. The stated cause of death was kidney failure and pneumonia. He is survived his wife, Elena Prohaska, his son, Sam, of Manhattan, and his sister, Norma Sue Madden of Pittsburgh. A tribute to Glinn was set up at the SAM Gallery in Seattle, Washington, where Glinn worked and lived during the 1950s and 1960s.

== Awards ==
- Dana Reed Award, Harvard College
- Mathew Brady Award for Magazine Photographer of the Year, University of Missouri
- Best Book of Photographic Reporting from Abroad, Overseas Press Club
- Best Print Ad of the Year, Art Director's Club of New York
- Best Annual Report of the Year from Financial World, Warner Communications Annual Report

== Exhibitions ==
- 2005 Havana: The Revolutionary Moment - George Eastman House, Rochester, New York, US
- 2002 Havana: The Revolutionary Moment - Photographs by Burt Glinn - Americas Society, New York, US
- 2000 Reflections: Photos of Water - Sag Harbor Picture Gallery, Sag Harbor, New York, US
- 1999 Fifty Years Behind a Camera: The Photography of Burt Glinn - Sag Harbor Picture Gallery, Sag Harbor, New York, US

== Books ==
- 1955 The Dark Eye in Africa (with Laurens van der Post), William Morrow, US; Hogarth Press, UK
- 1967 A Portrait of All the Russias (with Laurens van der Post), William Morrow, US; Hogarth Press, UK, ISBN 978-0-7012-0243-9
- 1968 A Portrait of Japan, (with Laurens van der Post), William Morrow, US, ASIN B000OLIBFQ
- 2001/02 Havana: The Revolutionary Moment, Umbrage Editions, US/Dewi Lewis, UK, ISBN 978-1-884167-09-6
