= Paul Fusco (photographer) =

American photojournalist (1930–2020)

John Paul Fusco
- Born: August 2, 1930; Leominster, Massachusetts, U.S.
- Died: July 15, 2020 (aged 89); San Anselmo, California, U.S.
- Education: Ohio University
- Known for: Photojournalism

John Paul Fusco (August 2, 1930 – July 15, 2020) was an American photojournalist. Fusco is known in particular for his photographs of Robert F. Kennedy's funeral train, the 1966 Delano Grape strike and the human toll of the Chernobyl nuclear disaster. Fusco began his career as a photographer for Look magazine, and was a member of Magnum Photos from 1973 until his death in 2020.

== Early life ==
Paul Fusco was born in Leominster, Massachusetts, and started pursuing photography as a hobby at the age of 14. During the Korean War, from 1951 to 1953, he gained more experience while he worked as a photographer for the United States Army Signal Corps. He first studied at Drake University and in 1957 received a Bachelor of Fine Arts in photojournalism from Ohio University. He then moved to New York City to work professionally as a photographer.

== Photography career ==
Fusco first worked for Look Magazine in New York City. While working there, in 1968, he took what would become a well-known series of photographs of mourners along the route of Robert F. Kennedy's funeral train.

His photography often documented social issues and injustices, such as poverty, ghetto life, the early days of the HIV crisis, and cultural experimentation across America.

His 1966 photos of California's Delano grape strike documented migrant farmworkers' struggles to form a union, supported by Cesar Chavez. The photos were released as a book, with text by George D. Horowitz, titled La Causa: The California Grape Strike.

Fusco moved to Mill Valley, California in the 1970s. In 1973 he became an associate of Magnum Photos and a full member a year later. Over the years, Fusco also contributed to such publications as Life, Mother Jones, the New York Times Magazine, Newsweek, Psychology Today, and Time.

Fusco also worked internationally covering events in Europe, the Middle East, and Southeast Asia. In the late 1990s, he spent two months making photographs of the lingering effects of the Chernobyl nuclear disaster in Belarus, eventually published in the book Chernobyl Legacy, which featured a foreword by Kofi Annan. In the early 2000s, Fusco pursued a personal project he called "Bitter Fruit," documenting the funerals of US service members killed in the Iraq War.

He left Mill Valley for New Jersey in 1993, but later returned to California, in 2009, to live in Marin County.

== Death and legacy ==
Fusco died on July 15, 2020, aged 89, in San Anselmo, California.

Many of his photographs are in the Magnum Photos archive currently held at the Harry Ransom Center at the University of Texas at Austin. Two hundred of his photographs of the United Farm Workers Organizing Committee and Cesar Chavez, taken during a farm worker's strike in Delano, California, are held by the Library of Congress, as are 1,800 Kodachrome slides taken in June 1968 from the funeral train carrying Robert Kennedy's body from New York City to Washington, D.C., for burial in Arlington National Cemetery.

== Books ==
- Sense Relaxation: Below the Mind. US: Collier, 1968; ISBN 978-0-671-78628-1
- La Causa: The California Grape Strike. US: Collier, 1970; ASIN B000M4HM3W.
- What to Do Until the Messiah Comes. US: Collier, 1971; ASIN B000JJY6KW
- The Photo Essay: Paul Fusco & Will McBride. US: Crowell, 1974; ASIN B001IOV0RE
- Marina & Ruby: Training a Filly with Love. US: William Morrow, 1977; ISBN 978-0-688-03229-6
- RFK Funeral Train. Umbrage/Magnum US, 2000; ISBN 978-1-884167-05-8
- Chernobyl Legacy. US: de. Mo, 2001; ISBN 978-0-9705768-0-4
- Paul Fusco: RFK. New York: Aperture, 2008; ISBN 978-1-59711-079-2
