= Nicolas Tikhomiroff =

French photographer

Nicolas Tikhomiroff (March 22, 1927 – April 17, 2016) was a French photographer, of Russian origin. He started working for Magnum in 1959. Famous for his work on World Cinema, he also had a large portfolio of war photography. Tikohomiroff retired and lived in France.

== Early life ==
Tikhomiroff was born in Paris to Russian "émigrés" parents. He received his education at a boarding school away from home with children of a similar background. He was trilingual with Russian as his primary language with French and English as secondary languages. When he reached the age of seventeen, just following the Liberation of Paris, he joined the French army. After finishing his duties he found a job working for a fashion photographer processing prints.

He was married to Shirley Lou Ritchie, by whom he had a daughter, Tamara Joan Tikhomiroff.

== Career ==
In 1956, Tikhomiroff was inspired by French journalist Michel Chevalier and struck out on his own as a freelance photographer. For the next few years he spent his time traveling with Chevalier to the Middle East, Africa, among other places. In 1959 Tikhomiroff joined Magnum. Most of his work was on wars such as in Cambodia, Laos, and Vietnam. He also did work for Magnum on World Cinema. He retired in 1987 and lived in Provence, France.

== A few notable photographs ==
- Film: Chimes at Midnight by US director Orson Welles. Spain. 1964. Filming of the movie Chimes at Midnight, directed by Orson Welles
- Italy. Rome. Movie industry. 1961. Luchino Visconti, Italian film and theater director, at his home.

== Books ==
- Mars 1961 PIAF en studio
