= William Vandivert =

American photographer (1912–1989)

- Born: August 16, 1912; Evanston, Illinois, U.S.
- Died: December 1, 1989 (aged 77)

William Vandivert (August 16, 1912 – December 1, 1989) was an American photographer, and co-founder in 1947 of the agency Magnum Photos.

== Biography ==
Vandivert was born in Evanston, Illinois. He studied chemistry from 1928 to 1930 at Beloit College in Wisconsin, and then photography at the Art Institute of Chicago from 1930 to 1935.

From 1935, he became a photographer for the Chicago Herald Examiner.

== Life ==
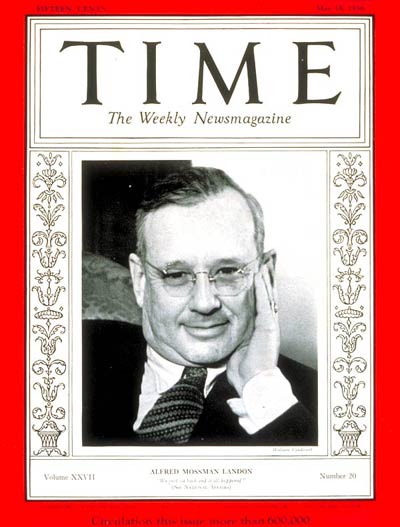
A 1936 Time cover by Vandivert

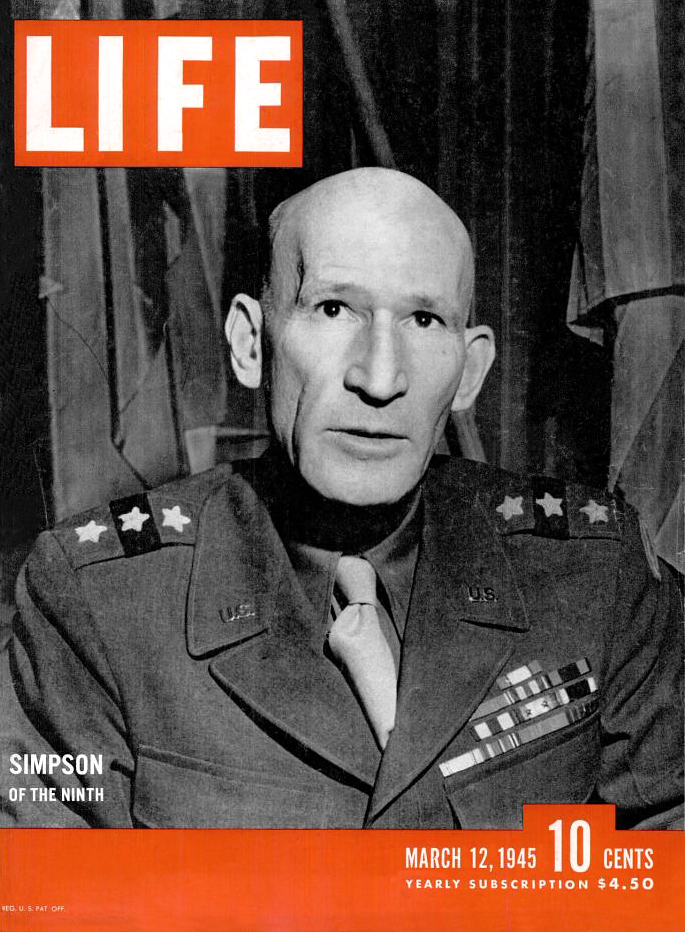
A 1945 Life cover by Vandivert

Vandivert joined the Life magazine team in London in 1938.

He was one of the few photographers who had worked in color photography before the Second World War. Vandivert made color photo report in Paris in the summer of 1939. He was using Kodachrome. The following year he photographed in color the Blitz in London.

For Life in 1943 he was in India to produce a harrowing series on the Bengal Famine, with photographs of an elderly woman dying by the roadside, an old man's ribs poking through his bare chest, truck sweepers cleaning corpses off the streets, and the starved dead being cremated in the street. One of the series, captioned Terribly concentrated on food, child stuffs self at Ramkrishna Mission Ashram near Calcutta was chosen in 1955 by curator Edward Steichen for the section 'Famine' in the world-touring Museum of Modern Art exhibition The Family of Man, that was seen by 9 million visitors.

He covered the Second World War in various theatres of European operations. At Gardelegen concentration camp, Vandivert took photographs reproduced in the May 7, 1945, issue of Life that show in detail the remains of hundreds of political prisoners who were locked in a warehouse when the German camp guards set it on fire; an atrocity discovered by Allied troops arriving on April 14, two days later. Printed quarter-page size, some show corpses that are still smouldering, while one picture filling page 35 illustrates an overview from inside the warehouse and the enormity of the atrocity.

In 1945 just after the Battle of Berlin, Vandivert was the first Western photojournalist to photograph the city's ruins and Adolf Hitler's bunker, which were published by Life in July 1945.

Vandivert left Life's editorial team in 1946.

== Magnum Photos ==
Along with Robert Capa, Henri Cartier-Bresson, David Seymour, George Rodger and Maria Eisner, he helped found Magnum Photos in 1947. His wife, Rita Vandivert, presided over the cooperative and managed the New York office at its opening

== Freelance ==
Vandivert and his wife left Magnum Photos in 1948. He continued his career as a freelance photographer, publishing numerous reports in Fortune magazine and then devoted himself with his wife to documentary photography on nature and animals. They published several books together between 1960 and 1982.

Vandivert died on December 1, 1989, at the age of 77.

== Publications ==
- Steichen, Edward (1955). The Family of Man: The Greatest Photographic Exhibition of All Time, 503 pictures from 68 countries. prologue by Carl Sandburg. Published for the Museum of Modern Art by the Maco Magazine Corporation.
- Vandivert, Rita; Vandivert, William (1957). Common Wild Animals and Their Young. drawings by Carl Burger. New York: Dell.
- Vandivert, Rita; Vandivert, Willam (1959), The porcupine known as J.R, Dodd, Mead
- Vandivert, Rita; Vandivert, William (1960), Young Russia : children of the USSR at work and play, Dodd, Mead
- Vandivert, William; Vandivert, Rita (1963), Barnaby, Dodd, Mead
- Favourite Wild Animals Of North America, text by Rita Vandivert, New York, Dodd, Mead & Company, 1973, (ISBN 9780590030281).
- Favourite Pets, text by Rita Vandivert. Scholastic, Incorporated, 1977. (ISBN 9780590087858)
- Vandivert, Rita; Vandivert, William, (ill.) (1982), To the rescue : seven heroes of conservation, F. Warne, ISBN 978-0-7232-6215-2

== Exhibitions ==
Vandivert's photographs were included in these exhibitions at the Museum of Modern Art, New York;

- Once Invisible, June 20–September 11, 1967
- The Family of Man, January 24–May 8, 1955
- Memorable Life, Photographs, November 20–December 12, 1951
- Lipchitz's Birth of the Muses, July 18–August 19, 1951
- Color Photography, May 9–July 4, 1950
- The Exact Instant, February 8–May 1, 1949
- 50 Photographs by 50 Photographers in which Vandivert showed Blitz In London, c.1941, July 27–September 26, 1948.
- In and Out of Focus: A Survey of Today's Photography, April 6–July 11, 1948
- Art in Progress: 15th Anniversary - Photography, May 24–September 17, 1944
- Portraits, November 4–December 7, 1943
- Two Years of War in England: Photographs by William Vandivert, April 15–June 10, 1942
- Three Centuries of American Art, May 24–July 31, 1938

== Collections ==
Vandivert's work is held in the following public collections:

- The Family of Man, Clervaux Castle, Luxembourg
- Museum of Modern Art (MoMA)
- National Portrait Gallery (United States)
- International Center of Photography
