= Erich Hartmann (photographer) =

American photographer

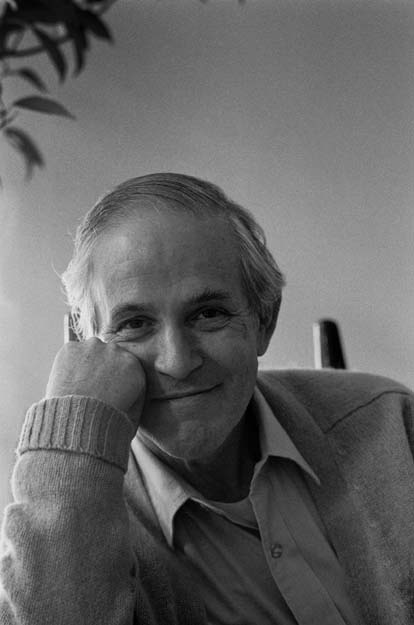
Erich Hartmann in 1981. (c) Nicholas Hartmann

Erich Hartmann (July 29, 1922 in Munich – February 4, 1999 in New York City) was a German-born American photographer.

== Life in Germany ==
Erich Hartmann was born July 29, 1922, in Munich, Germany, the eldest child of Max and Irma (Blattner) Hartmann who lived in Passau, a small city on the Danube near the Austrian border in which they were one of five Jewish families. Hartmann's family was middle class. His father, a Social-Democrat who served during World War I and had been imprisoned by the British, was highly respected. In 1930, only eight years old, Erich took his first photographs.

Life became increasingly difficult after the Nazi takeover in 1933, including personal, financial, business, and family restrictions and the beginning of deportations of Jews to the first so-called 'labor camp' in the village of Dachau. The Hartmann family moved to Munich that year, in search of a more tolerant and cosmopolitan environment. The situation only worsened, however, and the family determined that they had to leave Germany.

In August 1938, they accepted the opportunity to emigrate to the United States, having received the necessary affidavit of support from distant relatives there. They sailed from Hamburg to New York City, staying initially in Washington Heights, Manhattan, before settling outside Albany, New York.

== Early photographic work ==
The only English speaker in the family, Erich Hartmann worked in a textile mill in Albany, New York, attending evening high school and later taking night courses at Siena College. On December 8, 1941, the day after the attack on Pearl Harbor, the US entered the war, and Erich enlisted in the US Army. Trained in Virginia and at Ohio State University, he had to wait until 1943 before serving in England, Belgium (Battle of the Bulge) and France, and with the liberating forces as a court interpreter at Nazi trials in Cologne, Germany.

At the end of the war he moved to New York City where, in 1946, he married Ruth Bains; they had two children, Nicholas (born in 1952) and Celia (born in 1956). During these years, he worked as an assistant to portrait photographer George Feyer, and then as a freelancer. He studied at the New School for Social Research with Charles Leirens, Berenice Abbott, and Alexey Brodovitch. His portrait subjects over the years included architect Walter Gropius, writers Arthur Koestler and Rachel Carson, musicians Leonard Bernstein and Gidon Kremer, actor Marcel Marceau, fellow photographer Ed Feingersh, and many other literary and musical personalities. Music played a great role in his life and work: "Music captured me before photography did," he recalled. "In my parents' house there was not much music except for a hand-cranked gramophone on which I surreptitiously and repeatedly played a record of arias from "Carmen". This was before I could read!″

In the 1950s Hartmann first became known to the wider public for his poetic approach to science, industry and architecture in a series of photo essays for Fortune magazine, beginning with The Deep North, The Building of Saint Lawrence Seaway and Shapes of Sound. He later did similar essays on the poetics of science and technology for French, German and American Geo and other magazines. Throughout his life he traveled widely on assignments for the major magazines of the US, Europe and Japan and for many corporations such as AT&T, Boeing, Bowater, Citroën, Citibank, Corning Glass, DuPont, European Space Agency, Ford, IBM, Johns Hopkins University, Kimberly-Clark, Pillsbury Company, Nippon Airways, Schlumberger, TWA, and Woolworth, for all of which he used color.

In 1952 he was invited to join Magnum Photos, the international photographers’ cooperative founded in 1947 by Robert Capa, David Seymour, George Rodger and Henri Cartier-Bresson, he served on the board of directors from 1967 to 1986, and as president in 1985–1986.

== Photojournalism and essays ==
His first solo exhibition Sunday with the Bridge, a photographic study of the Brooklyn Bridge, opened at the Museum of the City of New York in 1956. In 1962, his book and exhibition Our Daily Bread toured widely around the United States. Many more exhibits followed over the years, in the United States, Japan, and throughout Europe. He lectured at the International Summer Academy in Salzburg, Austria, at the Syracuse University School of Journalism, and elsewhere, taught at workshops and seminars, and received commendations including the Photokina award (Cologne, Germany), the CRAF International Award (Italy), the Newhouse Citation in Photography (US) and numerous Art Directors Club awards.

His principal interest, in photography as in life, was the way in which people relate both to their natural surroundings and to the environments they create. Our Daily Bread and The World of Work were continuing long-term projects. He documented not only industry and technology – glass-making, boat-building, farming, food production, aviation, construction, space exploration, scientific research – but also the human cultural and geographical context: Shakespeare's England, James Joyce's Dublin or Thomas Mann's Venice.

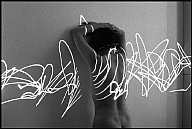
"Writing with Light" (c) Erich Hartmann/Magnum.

His personal projects reveal a fascination with the way technology can embody beauty: the abstract patterns of ink drops in water, intimate portraits of tiny precision-manufactured components, or laser light in natural and man-made environments. His obsession with laser light began in the 1970s, Ruth Hartmann remembers: ″He saw there a way to make light truly "write", to "photo" "graph". He began experimenting with diffusing laser light through different kind of glass, through prisms, lenses of all kinds, through faceted doorknobs, breaking the light into pieces to make designs, to write. He then refined his techniques so as to be able to impose a controlled image of concentrated light on landscapes, then on people. This culminated in a major show in New York and other smaller shows.″

== In The Camps ==
Auschwitz, Bełżec, Bergen-Belsen, Birkenau, Buchenwald, Bullenhuser Damm, Chełmno, Dachau, Emsland, Gross Rosen, Majdanek, Mauthausen, Natzweiler, Neuengamme, Ravensbrück, Sachsenhausen, Sobibor, Theresienstadt, Treblinka, Vught, Westerbork ...

For more than eight weeks in 1994, Erich and Ruth Hartmann undertook a winter journey to photograph the remains of the Nazi concentration and extermination camps, and places of deportation, throughout Europe. He was determined to take only black and white photographs and to capture only what he saw, immediately when arriving, no matter whether days looked like nights.

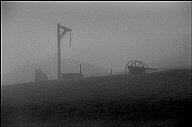
Concentration Camp of Natzweiler-Struthof, France (c) Erich Hartmann/Magnum.

He returned to New York with 120 rolls of film, from which he made a first edit of 300 photographs and a final selection of only 74 frames. These, together with text by Ruth Bains Hartmann, formed the book and exhibition In the Camps, published in 1995 in English, French, and German and exhibited in more than twenty venues in the US and Europe in the years since:

″If I have learned any lesson from having been in the remains of the camps," says Hartmann, ″it is that thinking or living for oneself alone has become an unaffordable luxury. Except perhaps in dreams, life no longer takes place on a solitary plane. It is now irrevocably complex, and we, whoever we are, have become intertwined one with the other, whether we like it or not. Acting on that belief may be a more effective tribute to the memory of the dead than mourning alone or vowing that it shall not happen again. And it may also be the most promising way of doing away with the concentration camps. I am not an optimist, but I believe that if we decide that we must link our lives inextricably – that "me" and "them" must be replaced by "us" – we may manage to make a life in which gas chambers will not be used again anywhere and a future in which children, including my granddaughters, will not know what they are.″

== Where I Was ==
In all of his travel, for work and pleasure, Hartmann carried a small camera with a few rolls of black and white film, prepared for every visual opportunity. He also deliberately pursued a series of imaginative projects including experiments with ink in water, stroboscopic light effects, beach pebbles constrained in boxes, and others. In the late 1990s, with an eye to a future retrospective exhibition, Hartmann began making a definitive selection from fifty years of this personal work in black and white. Just a few months before his death he began discussions with a gallery in Austria about organizing an exhibition called "Where I Was". Ruth Hartmann continued and completed the project after he died, and "Where I Was" opened at Galerie Fotohof in Salzburg on June 27, 2000, traveling subsequently to Germany, New York, and Tokyo.

″Different from most posthumous exhibits″, writes Ruth Hartmann, ″the beginning, the idea and impetus for this came from the photographer himself in his lifetime and has been realized by others attempting to continue the idea in accordance with his notes″.

The project Where I Was represents a thematic rather than a geographic record, described by Ruth Hartmann as a "frame of mind." A central example is a 1969 series on a mannequin factory, which served as a metaphor for social and industrial dehumanization. Throughout his career, Hartmann maintained a distinction between his professional assignments, which were often shot in color, and his personal work, for which he carried a separate camera loaded with black-and-white film. These personal images documented "life in progress" and people within their environments, focusing on subjects that were enigmatic or ambitious in scope. This practice provided a creative balance to his commercial work, which included studies of technology; some images from those professional assignments were eventually integrated into his personal archive.

On February 4, 1999, Erich Hartmann died unexpectedly from a heart attack in New York.

== Exhibitions ==
- 2015 "Our Daily Bread" – Landesmuseum, Zurich, Switzerland
- 2012 "The Abstract Art of Erich Hartmann" – Clair Galerie, St. Paul de Vence, France
- 2011–2012 "View New York – Nine Perceptions" – Clair Galerie, Munich; German-American Institute, Tübingen; Carl-Schurz-Haus, Freiburg im Breisgau, Germany
- 2009 Erich Hartmann – Clair Gallery, Munich, Germany
- 2008 A Place in Maine – Magnum Gallery, Paris, France
- 2007 Music Makers – United World College of the Adriatic, Duino, Italy
- 2007 Mannequin Factory – Ikona Gallery, Venice, Italy
- 2006 Writing with Light – Atlas Gallery, London, UK
- 2005 Writing with Light – Artefact Gallery, Zurich, Switzerland
- 2005 Dublin 1964 – Memphis in May – Robinson Gallery, Memphis, Tennessee, US
- 2004 Dublin 1964 – Gallery of Photography, Dublin, Ireland
- 2004 Security, Privilege and Freedom: A Transatlantic Crossing on Queen Elizabeth – South Street Seaport Museum, New York City
- 2000–2002 Where I Was – Fotohof, Salzburg, Austria; Leica Gallery, New York City; St. Anna-Kapelle, Passau, Germany; Jewish Museum Munich, Germany; Leica Gallery, Tokyo, Japan
- 1995–2008 In the Camps – Arc de Triomphe, Paris, France; Goethe House, Leica Gallery, New York City; NGBK Gallery, Berlin, Germany; Kunsthaus, Hamburg, Germany; St. Anna-Kapelle, Passau, Germany; National Monument, Camp Vught, Netherlands; Palazzo delle Esposizioni, Rome, Italy; Villa Cian, Spilimbergo, Italy; Sala San Leonardo, Venice, Italy and other venues in US and Europe
- 1991 High Technology – shown in Berlin and Bonn in Germany and at other venues in Europe
- 1989 Musicians at Work – Lockenhaus Chamber Music Festival, Austria
- 1988 Veritas – Cathedral of St. John the Divine, New York City
- 1987 Washington – Magnum Gallery, Paris, France
- 1985 The Heart of Technology – Paris, Amsterdam, Hamburg, Tokyo
- 1984 Erich Hartmann Slept Here – Residenz Gallery, Salzburg
- 1983 Macroworld – Olympus Galleries in Paris, Hamburg, Tokyo, London
- 1982 Train Journey – French Cultural Institute, New York; numerous other venues in the US; Paris, Tokyo, Hamburg
- 1982 Europe in Space – The Photographers' Gallery, London. UK;
- 1978 A Play of Light – Neikrug Gallery, New York City
- 1977 Photographs with a Laser – AIGA Gallery, New York City; Fiolet Gallery, Amsterdam, Netherlands
- 1976 Carnet de Route & Natures Mortes – Photogalerie, Paris, France
- 1971 Mannequin Factory – Underground Gallery, New York City; Fiolet Gallery, Amsterdam, Netherlands;
- 1962 Our Daily Bread – The Coliseum, New York City; Department of Agriculture, Washington, D.C., US; numerous other venues in the US
- 1956 Sunday with the Bridge – Museum of the City of New York, US; Brooklyn Museum, New York City

== Books ==
- 2000 Where I Was, Otto Muller Verlag, Austria
- 1995 In The Camps, W.W. Norton Company US, UK; Dans le silence des camps, La Martinière, France; Stumme Zeugen: Photographien aus Konzentrazionslagern, Lambert Schneider, Germany; Il silenzio dei campi, Contrasto, Italy
- 1972 Space: Focus Earth, The European Space Research Organisation and Arcade, US; L'Europe des satellites, hommes et techniques, Arcade, France
- 1965 About OXO, Spectator Publications, US
