= Diana Markosian =

American documentary photographer, writer, and filmmaker

- Born: 1989 (age 36–37); Moscow, Russia
- Education: Columbia University
- Occupation: Documentary photographer
- Website: www.dianamarkosian.com

Diana Markosian (born 1989) is an American artist of Armenian descent working as a documentary photographer, writer, and filmmaker.

Markosian is known for her photo essays, including Inventing My Father, (2013-2014) about her relationship with her father, and 1915, (2015) about the lives of those who survived the Armenian genocide and the land from which they were expelled. Her most recent project, Santa Barbara, published by Aperture, reconstructs her mother's journey from post-Soviet Russia to America, inspired by a 1980s American soap opera. Through a series of staged photographs and a narrative video, the artist reconsiders her family history from her mother’s perspective, relating to her for the first time as a woman rather than a parent, and coming to terms with the profound sacrifices her mother made to become an American.

== Personal life ==
Markosian was born in Moscow. In 1996, she moved to California with her mother and her brother, while her father remained in Russia. She had no contact with him until 23, when she found her father in Armenia, after 15 years of being apart.

Markosian graduated summa cum laude with a bachelor of arts in history and international studies in 2008, and earned a Master of Science from Columbia University's Graduate School of Journalism in 2010 at the age of 20.

=== 2011 incident in Azerbaijan ===
In 2011, Markosian was sent to Azerbaijan as a photographer for Bloomberg, but she was denied entrance to the country, which was at war with Armenia at the time. Markosian is of Armenian descent but not a citizen of Armenia. The authorities said they couldn't provide her with the "security" she would need because of her Armenian last name. Markosian was held in detention overnight, until she was eventually deported.

== Photography ==
Markosian began her career at 20. Her editorial and personal work has taken her to some of the most remote corners of the world. She worked on assignments for publications including National Geographic Magazine, The New Yorker and The New York Times. For her first assignment for National National Geographic Magazine in 2015, she was commissioned to explore the power and legacy of the Virgin Mary. This ability to photograph "things that are no longer there" has become a signature of her work. Her images have since been published by The Financial Times, World Policy Journal, The New York Times, Foreign Policy, The Times, Human Rights Watch, Amnesty International, amongst other publications.

=== Awards ===
She won the Columbia School of Journalism's annual photography prize, and was chosen as a duPont Fellow. She was selected for the Joop Swart Masterclass from World Press Photo and was the winner of the Magnum Emerging Photographer Fund in 2013. In 2015, she was selected as the first recipient of the Chris Hondros Emerging Photographer Award. The same year, the British Journal of Photography selected her in its global survey of "Ones to Watch". In 2016, Markosian became a nominee member of Magnum Photos. In 2018, she was awarded the Elliott Erwitt Fellowship to travel to Cuba, where she documented the coming of age of young girls in Havana. The work she created was exhibited as a solo show at the Grand Palais in Paris Photo and Photo Espana. She was awarded 1st Place in Contemporary Issues from World Press Photo for an image of Pura, a young girl who was diagnosed with a brain tumor as a child, and was photographed celebrating her quinceanera.
