= Richard Kalvar =

American photographer (born 1944)

Richard Kalvar (born 1944) is an American photographer who has been associated with Magnum Photos since 1975.

Kalvar has had a solo exhibition at Maison européenne de la photographie in Paris.

== Life and work ==
Kalvar was born in Brooklyn, New York. A trip to Europe in 1966 with a Pentax camera given him by French fashion photographer Jérôme Ducrot (with whom Kalvar worked in New York as an assistant) inspired him to become a photographer. On his return to New York he worked at Modernage photo lab. Two years later he moved to Paris and joined Agence Vu photography agency.

Kalvar has worked around the world, especially in England, France, Italy, Japan and the United States.

== Exhibitions ==
=== Solo exhibitions ===
- Agathe Gaillard Gallery, Paris
- 2007: Terrans, Maison européenne de la photographie, Paris
- 2008: Retrospective, Casal Solleric, Illes Balears, Spain
- 2010: Earthlings: Retrospective, Städtische Galerie Iserlohn, Iserlohn, Germany

=== Group exhibitions ===
- 2015: Paris Magnum, Hôtel de Ville, Paris
- 2017: Magnum Analog Recovery Le Bal, Paris

== Publications ==
=== Publications by Kalvar ===
- Familles en France. France: Viva, 1973.
- L’Usine. France: Colgate Palmolive, 1987, ASIN B004AEYWEC.
- Portrait de Conflans-Sainte-Honorine. France: P.O. Calmann-Lévy, 1993, ISBN 978-2-7021-2163-4.
- Earthlings. Flammarion, 2007, ISBN 978-2-08-030009-6.

=== Publications with others ===
- Street Photography Now. London: Thames & Hudson, 2010. ISBN 978-0-500-54393-1. Edited by Sophie Howarth and Stephen McLaren.
