= Magnum Photos =

International photographic cooperative

- Logo as of 2024
- Company type: Cooperative
- Industry: Photography
- Founded: 1947; 79 years ago
- Founder: Robert Capa, David "Chim" Seymour, Henri Cartier-Bresson, George Rodger, William Vandivert, Rita Vandivert, Maria Eisner
- Headquarters: New York City, Paris, London, Tokyo
- Area served: Worldwide
- Products: Photojournalism, stock photography
- Website: www.magnumphotos.com

Magnum Photos is an international photographic cooperative owned by its photographer-members, with offices in Paris, New York City and London. It was founded in 1947 in Paris by photographers Robert Capa, David "Chim" Seymour, Maria Eisner, Henri Cartier-Bresson, George Rodger, William Vandivert, and Rita Vandivert. Its photographers retain all copyrights to their own work.

In 2010, MSD Capital acquired a collection of nearly 200,000 original press prints of images taken by Magnum photographers, which in 2013 it donated to the Harry Ransom Center.

== Founding of agency ==
Magnum was founded in Paris in 1947 by Robert Capa, David "Chim" Seymour, Henri Cartier-Bresson, George Rodger and William Vandivert (all photographers), Rita Vandivert and Maria Eisner, based on an idea of Capa's. (Seymour, Cartier-Bresson and Rodger were all absent from the meeting at which it was founded. In response to a letter telling him that he was a member, Rodger wrote that Magnum seemed a good idea but, "It all sounded too halcyon to be true," when Capa had told him of it and, "I rather dismissed the whole thing from my mind".)

Rita Vandivert was the cooperative's first president and head of the New York office, while Maria Eisner headed the Paris office. The plan was for Rodger to cover Africa and the Middle East; Cartier-Bresson to cover south and east Asia; Seymour and William Vandivert to cover Europe and the United States, respectively; and Capa to be free to follow his curiosity and events.

Magnum is one of the first photographic cooperatives, owned and administered entirely by members. The staff serve a support role for the photographers, who retain all copyrights to the photographs they take.

The Magnum cooperative has included photojournalists from across the world who have covered many historical events of the 20th century. The cooperative's archive includes photographs depicting family life, drugs, religion, war, poverty, famine, crime, government and celebrities.

Although it has been asserted that the name "Magnum" was chosen because the founding members always drank a bottle of champagne during the first meetings, Russell Miller writes:

It was . . . presumably agreed by those present [at the first meeting] that Magnum was a fine new name for such a bold new venture, indicative as it was of greatness in its literal Latin translation, toughness in its gun connotation and celebration in its champagne mode.

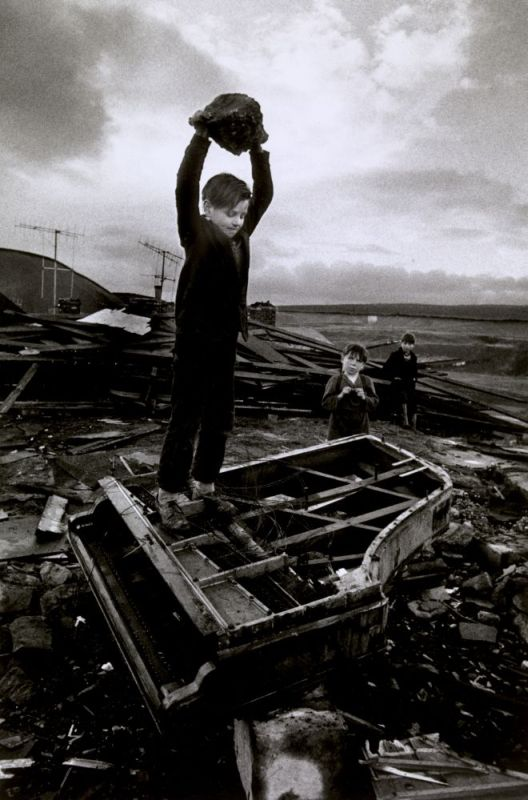
Boy destroying piano at Pant-y-Waen, South Wales, by Philip Jones Griffiths, 1961

== Governance ==
Magnum is owned by its photographers, who act as shareholders. Each full member of Magnum has a vote in proposals made at a meeting held once a year, called the Annual General Meeting (AGM). Photographers with the status of contributor or correspondent are represented by Magnum but have no voting rights. Full members can choose to become contributors after 23 years of membership; this status gives them increased liberty to work outside Magnum, at the cost of their voting rights.

== Elections of new members ==
Interview with Abbas about Magnum

In the early years of Magnum, membership had generally come about by the personal invitation of Robert Capa. However, in 1955 a three-stage membership system was set up that continues to this day and is described below. Until 1953 there were also a large number of stringers who used Magnum but were not members.

Magnum's photographers meet once a year, during the last weekend in June, in New York City, Paris or London, to discuss the cooperative's business. One day of the meeting is reserved to review potential new members' portfolios and vote on admitting individuals. An approved applicant is invited to become a 'Nominee Member' of Magnum, a category of membership that provides a chance for members and the individual to get to know each other, but that includes no binding commitments on either side.

After two years of Nominee membership, a photographer may present another portfolio if wanting to apply for 'Associate Membership'. If successful, the photographer is bound by the rules of the agency, and enjoys its facilities and worldwide representation. The difference between an Associate Member and a full Member is that an Associate is not a Director of the Company and does not have voting rights in the corporate decision-making. After two more years, an Associate wanting to be considered for full membership presents another portfolio of work for consideration by the members. Once elected as a full member, the individual is a member of Magnum for life or for as long as the photographer chooses.

== Accusations of child abuse ==
Magnum Photos' digital archive constitutes more than 1 million images, which Magnum licenses through its website. In August 2020, the Magnum website was taken offline after issues were raised by the Fstoppers photography website and amplified on social media by others including Jörg Colberg. Given the tags on the photos, there was concern that Magnum was making available photographs of children featuring nudity; that documented encounters that constituted a record of acts of child sexual abuse; and that were problematic in terms of the way they had been labelled for searching. "Much of the criticism [. . .] has focused on a series of photographs by the US photographer David Alan Harvey from his time documenting sex workers in Bangkok in 1989." In a statement Magnum said it will re-examine the content of its archive, and has since made its website available again but without Harvey's Bangkok series. Harvey was later suspended for a year following a formal investigation into sexual misconduct allegations against him.

== Photographic collection ==
In February 2010, Magnum announced that Michael Dell's venture capital firm MSD Capital had acquired a collection of nearly 200,000 original press prints of images taken by Magnum photographers. It had formed a partnership with the Harry Ransom Center at The University of Texas at Austin to preserve, catalog, and make photographs available to the general public. In September 2013 it was announced MSD Capital donated the collection to the Ransom Center. A preliminary inventory is available for researchers who wish to use the collection.

== Graduate Photographers Award ==
The Graduate Photographers Award was established in 2015.

== Member list ==
Name	Nationality	Status	Active years	Note
Abbas Attar	Iran	Deceased	1981–2018	Nominee from 1981; Full Member from 1985
William Keo	France	Withdrawn
Antoine d'Agata	France	Active (full Member)	2004–
Khalik Allah	United States	Withdrawn
Christopher Anderson	United States	Withdrawn
Ansel Adams	United States	Deceased	Nonmember correspondent 1956–
Eve Arnold	United States	Deceased	1951–2012	Associate Member from 1951; Member from 1957 First female Member.
Olivia Arthur	United Kingdom	Active (full Member)	2008–	Nominee from 2008, associate from 2011, and full member from 2013.
Micha Bar-Am	Israel	Active (Correspondent)	1968–	Correspondent from 1968
Bruno Barbey	France	Deceased	1964– 2020	Member from 1968.
Jonas Bendiksen	Norway	Active (full Member)	2004–	Nominee from 2004; Member from 2008
Ian Berry	United Kingdom	Active (full Member)	1967–	Member from 1962.
Werner Bischof	Switzerland	Deceased	1948–1954	Associate member from 1948, full member from 1949
Matt Black	United States	Active (Full member)	2015–
Brian Brake	New Zealand	Withdrawn	1957–1966	Deceased
Michael Christopher Brown	United States	Withdrawn	2013–2017
René Burri	Switzerland	Deceased	1955–2014	Associate Member from 1955; Member from 1959
Enri Canaj	Albania	Active (Associate)	2017–
Cornell Capa	Hungary / United States	Deceased	1954–2008	Member from 1954; Brother of Robert
Robert Capa	Hungary / United States	Deceased	1947–1954	Founding member
Henri Cartier-Bresson	France	Deceased	1947–2004	Founding member; Contributor from 1966
Chien-Chi Chang	Taiwan	Active (full Member)	1995–	Member from 2001
Bruce Davidson	United States	Active (Contributor)	1956–	Member from 1959
Carl de Keyzer	Belgium	Active (full Member)	1990–	Member from 1994
Cristina de Middel	Spain	Active (full Member)	2017–
Luc Delahaye	France	Withdrawn	1994–2004
Raymond Depardon	France	Active (Contributor)	1978–	Associate Member from 1978; Member from 1979
Bieke Depoorter	Belgium	Active (full Member)	2012–
Carolyn Drake	United States	Active (Full member)	2015–
Thomas Dworzak	Germany	Active (full Member)	2000–	Nominee from 2000; member from 2004
Nikos Economopoulos	Greece	Active (full Member)	1990–	Member from 1994
Elliott Erwitt	France / United States	Deceased	1953–2023	Member from 1954
Martine Franck	Belgium	Deceased	1980–2012	Member from 1983
Stuart Franklin	United Kingdom	Active (full Member)	1985–	Member from 1990.
Leonard Freed	United States	Deceased	1956–2006	Member from 1972
Gisèle Freund	France	Deceased	1947–1954
Paul Fusco	United States	Deceased	1974–2020	Member from 1974
Cristina García Rodero	Spain	Active (full Member)	2005–	Member from 2009
Jean Gaumy	France	Active (full Member)	1977–	Member from 1986
Bruce Gilden	United States	Active (full Member)	1998–	Member from 2002
Burt Glinn	United States	Deceased	1951–2008	Associate Member from 1951; Member from 1954
Mark Godfrey	United States	Withdrawn	1974–1981
Jim Goldberg	United States	Active (full Member)	2002–	Member from 2006
Philip Jones Griffiths	United Kingdom	Deceased	1966–2008	Associate Member from 1966; Member from 1971
Harry Gruyaert	Belgium	Active (Contributor)	1981–	Member from 1986
Ara Güler	Turkey	Deceased	Early 1960s	Did not retain membership for long
Ernst Haas	Austria	Deceased	1950–1986	Contributor from 1966
Gregory Halpern	United States	Active (full Member)	2018–	Nominee from 2018
Philippe Halsman	Russia (Latvia) / United States	Deceased	1951–1979	Contributing member from 1956
Hiroshi Hamaya	Japan	Deceased	1960–1999	Associate Member from 1960
Charles Harbutt	United States	Withdrawn	1964–1981
Erich Hartmann	Germany / United States	Deceased	1951–1999	Member from 1952
David Alan Harvey	United States	Was full Member but suspended then resigned	1993–2020	Member from 1997. Harvey received a one-year suspension in 2020 following sexual misconduct allegations. Magnum voted to remove him as a member and he resigned in 2021 before the board had their final meeting regarding the matter.
Nanna Heitmann	Germany/Russia	Active (full Member)	2019–	Nominee from 2019
Bob Henriques	United States	Deceased	1957–1961 (circa)
Tim Hetherington	United Kingdom	Deceased	2011	Posthumous acceptance; Hetherington was preparing to apply to Magnum at the time of his death.
Abigail Heyman	United States	Deceased	1970s;
Thomas Hoepker	Germany	Deceased	1964–2024	Member from 1989; president 2003–2006.
Sohrab Hura	India	Active (full member)	2014–	Nominee member from 2014; Associate member from 2018; full member from 2020
David Hurn	United Kingdom	Active (full Member)	1965–	Associate Member from 1965; Member from 1967
Richard Kalvar	United States	Active (full Member)	1975–	Associate Member from 1975; Member from 1977.
Sakir Khader	Netherlands / Palestine	Active (Nominee)	2024–	Nominee since 2024.
Josef Koudelka	Czech Republic	Active (Contributor)	1971–	Associate Member from 1971; Member from 1974.
Kent Klich	Sweden	Withdrawn	1998–2002
Hiroji Kubota	Japan	Active (full Member)	1971–	Associate Member from 1971; Member from 1989.
Dorothea Lange	United States	Deceased	Nonmember correspondent 1956–
Sergio Larraín	Chile	Deceased	1959–2012	Associate Member from 1959; Member from 1961; Contributor from 1970
Russell Lee	United States	Deceased	Nonmember correspondent 1956–
Guy Le Querrec	France	Active (full Member)	1976–	Member from 1977.
Erich Lessing	Austria	Deceased	1950– 2018	Member from 1955; later Contributor until his death in 2018
Herbert List	Germany	Deceased	Contributor 1951–1975
Paul Lowe	United Kingdom	Deceased	1998
Danny Lyon	United States	Withdrawn	1966–1968
Alex Majoli	Italy	Active (full Member)	1996–	Member from 2001.
Constantine Manos	United States	Deceased	1963–	Member from 1965.
Mary Ellen Mark	United States	Deceased	1977–1981
Diana Markosian	Armenia	Withdrawn	2016–2019	Nominee Member from 2016
Peter Marlow	United Kingdom	Deceased	1986–2016	Member from 1986 to his death in 2016.
Fred Mayer	Switzerland	Withdrawn	1967 – 2009
Don McCullin	United Kingdom	Withdrawn	1968–1969
Steve McCurry	United States	Active (Contributor)	1986–	Member from 1986.
Susan Meiselas	United States	Active (full Member)	1976–	Member from 1980.
Lorenzo Meloni	Italy	Active (full Member)	2015–	Nominee from 2015; Associate member from 2018
Rafał Milach	Poland	Active (full Member)	2018–	Nominee from 2018
Wayne F. Miller	United States	Deceased	Nonmember correspondent 1956–1958; member 1958–2013	Member from 1958, later a contributor.
Inge Morath	Austria	Deceased	1953–2002	Member from 1955.
Richard Mosse	Ireland	Withdrawn	2015–
James Nachtwey	United States	Withdrawn	1986–2001
Dominic Nahr	Switzerland	Withdrawn	2010–2015
Emin Özmen	Turkey	Active (full Member)	2017–
Trent Parke	Australia	Active (full Member)	2002–	Member from 2007.
Suzy Parker	United States	Deceased		According to John G. Morris, "Capa showed model Suzy Parker how to take pictures, and for a while she was listed as a Magnum photographer".
Martin Parr	United Kingdom	Deceased	1988–2025	Member from 1994.
Paolo Pellegrin	Italy	Active (full Member)	2001–	Nominee from 2001; Member from 2005.
Gilles Peress	France	Active (Contributor)	1970–	As of 2010, a Contributor.
Gueorgui Pinkhassov	Russia	Active (Contributor)	1986–	Member from 1994.
Mark Power	United Kingdom	Active (full Member)	2002–	Member from 2007.
Raghu Rai	India	Deceased	1977–2026
Eli Reed	United States	Active (full Member)	1983–
Lua Ribeira	Spain	Active (full Member)	2018–	Nominee from 2018
Marc Riboud	France	Deceased	1955–2016
Eugene Richards	United States	Withdrawn	1983–
Miguel Rio Branco	Brazil	Active (Correspondent)	1978–	Associate Member from 1980
George Rodger	United Kingdom	Deceased	1947–1995	Founding member; Contributor from 1970
Sebastião Salgado	Brazil	Withdrawn	1979–1994
Moises Saman	Spain	Active (full member)	2010–	Nominee member from 2010; full member from 2014
Alessandra Sanguinetti	United States / Argentina	Active (full Member)	2007–
Lise Sarfati	France	Withdrawn	1997–
Ferdinando Scianna	Italy	Active (Contributor)	1982–	Member from 1989
Jérôme Sessini	France	Active (full Member)	2012–
David Seymour	Poland, France, United States	Deceased	1947–1956	Founding member
Marilyn Silverstone	United States / Nepal	Deceased	1964–	Associate Member from 1964, Full Member from 1967, Contributor from 1975
W. Eugene Smith	United States	Withdrawn	1957–1958	Deceased
Lindokuhle Sobekwa	South Africa	Active (Associate)	2018–	Nominee from 2018
Jacob Aue Sobol	Denmark	Active (full Member)	2007–
Alec Soth	United States	Active (full Member)	2004–	Nominee from 2004; Member from 2008
Chris Steele-Perkins	United Kingdom	Active (full Member)	1979–	Nominee from 1979; Associate Member from 1981; Member from 1983
Dennis Stock	United States	Deceased	1951–2009	Associate Member from 1951; Member from 1957
Matt Stuart	United Kingdom	Withdrawn	2016–2018	Nominee Member from 2016
Mikhael Subotzky	South Africa	Active (Full member)	2007–
Krijn Taconis	Netherlands	Withdrawn	1954–1960	Deceased
Newsha Tavakolian	Iran	Active (Full member)	2015–
Nicolas Tikhomiroff	Russia / France	Withdrawn	1959–2016	Deceased
Larry Towell	Canada	Active (full Member)	1988–
Ilkka Uimonen	Finland	Withdrawn	2002–
Burk Uzzle	United States	Withdrawn	1967–1983	1979–1980 President
Peter van Agtmael	United States	Active (Full Member)	2008–	Nominee from 2008, associate from 2011, and full member from 2013.
William Vandivert	United States	Deceased	1947–1948	Founding member
John Vink	Belgium	Withdrawn	1993–2007	Member from 1997
Alex Webb	United States	Active (full Member)	1976–
Simon Wheatley	Singapore	Withdrawn	2005–2011
Donovan Wylie	United Kingdom	Withdrawn	1992–2017	Member from 1997
Sim Chi Yin	Singapore	Withdrawn	2018–	Nominee from 2018
Patrick Zachmann	France	Active (full Member)	1985–

== Publications ==
- America in Crisis. New York, NY: Ridge Press; Holt, Rinehart and Winston, 1969. ISBN 9780030810206. Text by Mitchel Levitas, edited by Charles Harbutt and Lee Jones, photographs by Eve Arnold, Cornell Capa, Bruce Davidson, Elliott Erwitt, Burt Glinn, Philip Jones Griffiths, Charles Harbutt, Danny Lyon, Constantine Manos, Donald McCullin, Dennis Stock, Mary Ellen Mark and possibly others.
- In Our Time: The World as Seen by Magnum Photographers. New York; London: W W Norton & Co Inc, 1989. ISBN 0-393-02767-8. By William Manchester. With essays by Manchester ("Images: a Wide Angle"), Jean Lacouture ("The Founders") and Fred Ritchin ("What is Magnum?"), and "Biographical Notes and Selected Bibliographies" and "Bibliography and Chronology of Magnum" by Stuart Alexander.
- Magnum Landscape. London: Phaidon, 1996. With a foreword by Ian Jeffrey and texts by Henri Peretz, "The Phenomenon of Landscape" and "Chronology of Landscape Photography".
  - Hardback, 1996.
  - Paperback, 2005. ISBN 0-7148-4522-1.
- magnum°. London: Phaidon, 2002. ISBN 978-0-7148-4356-8. Text by Michael Ignatieff, design by Julia Hasting.
- Magnum Stories by Chris Boot. London: Phaidon, 2004. ISBN 0-7148-4245-1.
- Our World in Focus. London: Trolley Books, 2004. ISBN 1-904563-22-8.
- Magnum Magnum. London: Thames & Hudson, 2007. Edited by Brigitte Lardinois.
  - Compact flexibound edition. London: Thames & Hudson, 2009, 2010. ISBN 978-0-500-28830-6.
- Pop Sixties by Magnum Photos. New York, NY: Abrams, 2008. ISBN 978-0-8109-9526-0.
- Reading Magnum: A Visual Archive of the Modern World, edited by Steven Hoelscher. Austin, TX: University of Texas Press, 2013. ISBN 978-0-292-74843-9.
- Magnum Analog Recovery. Paris: Le Bal, 2017. Edited by Diane Dufour, Pierre Haurquet and Anna Planas. English (ISBN 9782919430000) and French editions.
- Magnum Manifesto. London: Thames and Hudson, 2017. ISBN 978-0500544556. English, French and Italian editions.
- Euro Visions. Paris: Steidl/Magnum in Partnership with the Centre Pompidou, 2006. ISBN 978-3865212238. English.
- Georgian Spring: A Magnum Journal. London: Chris Boot in Partnership with the Georgian Ministry of Culture, 2009. ISBN 978-1905712151. English and Georgian editions.
- Magnum Cycling. London: Thames & Hudson, 2016. With text by Guy Andrews. ISBN 978-0500544570. English.
- Paris: Magnum. Flammarion, 2014. ISBN 978-2080301529. English and French editions.
- Women Changing India. University of Chicago Press, in Partnership with BNP Paribas, 2013. ISBN 978-8189884970. English.
- Magnum Chronicles 01: a Brief Visual History in the Time of ISIS. Magnum, 2018. Newspaper format. Text in English and Arabic.
- Magnum Streetwise: the ultimate collection of street photography from Magnum Photos. London; New York: Thames & Hudson, 2019. Edited by Stephen McLaren. Photographs from various Magnum photographers. ISBN 978-0500545072.

== See also ==
- David Kogan – CEO from 2015 to 2019
- Michelle Vignes
- Deca (journalism collective)
- Magnum Foundation
