= Lise Sarfati =

French photographer and artist

- Born: 12 April 1958 (age 68); Oran, French Algeria (now Algeria)
- Education: The Sorbonne, MA, 1979
- Awards: Prix Niepce (1996) ICP Infinity Award (1996)
- Website: http://lisesarfati.com/

Lise Sarfati (born 1958) is a French photographer and artist. She is noted for her photographs of elusive characters, often young, who resist any attempt to be pinned down. Her work particularly explores the instability of feminine identity. Most recently, Sarfati’s photographs have focused on the relationship between individuals and the urban landscape. She has extensively worked in Russia and the United States.

== Life and work ==
Born in Oran, French Algeria, and of Pieds-Noir descent, Sarfati spent her childhood in Nice, France, which she credits as having inspired her sensitivity about colour in her work. She became interested in Russian culture and society following a holiday to the Soviet Union aged 15. She graduated with an MA in Russian Studies from the Sorbonne in 1979. In 1986, she became the official photographer for the Académie des Beaux Arts. From 1989 to 1998, she lived in the Soviet Union and then Russia, capturing the atmosphere of a country in transition. Her images of urban ruins and young people in their interior spaces resulted in her first major body of work, Acta Est (2000) published by Phaidon. The series’ poetic approach set itself apart from the categories of travelogue and photo-journalistic essay, conjuring a richly layered world at the edge of reality and fiction.

In 2003, she travelled across the United States photographing adolescents in cities such as Austin (TX), Asheville (NC), Portland (OR), New Orleans (LO), Berkeley, Oakland and Los Angeles (CA). The title of this series La Vie Nouvelle (2005) is inspired by La vita nova of Dante Alighieri. The book is published by Twin Palms Publishers. Her subsequent American projects Austin, Texas (2008), On Hollywood (2010) and She (2012) further explore her interests on psychogeography, feminine identity, and the everyday.

With Oh Man (2017), a series of richly detailed tableaux depicting lonesome men walking in downtown Los Angeles, Sarfati departed from her accustomed 35mm format, opting for a 4x5 view camera. This slower image-making process enabled her to enlarge the space for contemplation and invite the viewer to explore what is hidden in these deceptively simple images. One of her photographs from this series was selected as the official visual of Paris Photo 2017.

Critic Sean O'Hagan, writing in The Guardian, said, “Sarfati's photographs, though deceptively simple on first viewing, have a mysterious quality that is to do, in part, with her deft merging of portraiture, snapshot and arranged tableau”.

Sarfati has been awarded the Prix Niepce (1996) and ICP Infinity Award (1996). Between 1996 and 2011, Sarfati was a member of Magnum Photos.

Sarfati is currently represented by Rose Gallery in Los Angeles.

== Influence ==
Cinematographer Sam Levy has cited Sarfati’s work as inspiration for the look of Greta Gerwig’s Oscar-nominated film Lady Bird (2017)

== Exhibitions ==
- Galerie Particulière (Paris Photo), Paris, France, 2017.
- Centro Italiano per la Fotografia, Torino, Italy, 2016.
- Los Angeles County Museum of Art LACMA, Los Angeles, USA, 2014.
- Yossi Milo Gallery, New York, USA, 2012.
- Brancolini Grimaldi Gallery London, UK, 2012.
- Rose Gallery, Santa Monica, CA, USA, 2012.
- Fotografins Hus, Stockholm, Sweden, 2009.
- La Maison Rouge, Paris, France, 2008.
- Center of Contemporary Art Vinzavod, Moscow, Russia, 2008.
- FOAM Fotografiemuseum, Amsterdam, the Netherlands, 2007.
- Aberdeen Art Gallery, Aberdeen, Scotland, 2007.
- Rencontres Internationales de la Photographie, Arles, France, 2006.
- Nicolaj Center of Contemporary Art, Copenhagen, Denmark, 2006.
- Museo de San Telmo, San Sebastian, Spain, 2005.
- The Photographer’s Gallery, London, UK, 2005.
- Domus Artium Centro del Arte, Salamanca, Spain, 2004.
- Maison Européenne de la Photographie, Paris, France, 2002.
- Centre National de la Photographie, Paris, France, 1996.

== Monographs ==
- Oh Man. Germany, Steidl, 2017. ISBN 978-3-95829-112-6. Essay by David Campany.
- She . Santa Fe, Twin Palms, 2012. ISBN 978-1-936611-00-3.
- Fashion Magazine: Lise Sarfati: Austin, Texas. New York, Magnum, 2008. ISBN 978-2-952410-22-9. Essay by Quentin Bajac.
- The New Life . Santa Fe, Twin Palms, 2005. ISBN 978-1-931885-45-4.
- Acta Est. Phaidon, 2007. ISBN 978-0-7148-4842-6. Essay by Olga Medvedkova.

== Collections ==
- Centre Pompidou, Paris, France
- LACMA, Los Angeles County Museum of Art, CA, USA
- SFMOMA, San Francisco Museum of Modern Art, CA, USA
- Brooklyn Museum, NY, USA
- De Young Museum, San Francisco, CA, USA
- Pier 24, San Francisco, CA, USA
- Bard Hessel Museum of Art, Bard College, Annandale-on-Hudson, NY, USA
- Santa Barbara Museum of Art, CA, USA
- Bruce and Nancy Berman Collection, Los Angeles, CA, USA
- Harry Ransom Center, University of Texas at Austin, TX, USA
- Philadelphia Museum of Art, USA
- Nelson-Atkins Museum of Art, MO, USA
- Maison Européenne de la Photographie, Paris, France
- Bibliothèque Nationale de France, Paris, France
- Fonds National d’Art Contemporain, Paris, France
- Musée Nicéphore Niépce, Chalon-sur-Saône, France
- Fondation Neuflize Vie, Paris, France
- Domus Artium, Salamanca, Spain
- Fondation Enrique Ordóñez, Spain
- Wilson Centre for Photography, London, UK
- Sir Elton John’s Collection, UK
