= Abbas (photographer) =

Iranian photographer (1944–2018)

Abbas Attar
- عباس عطار
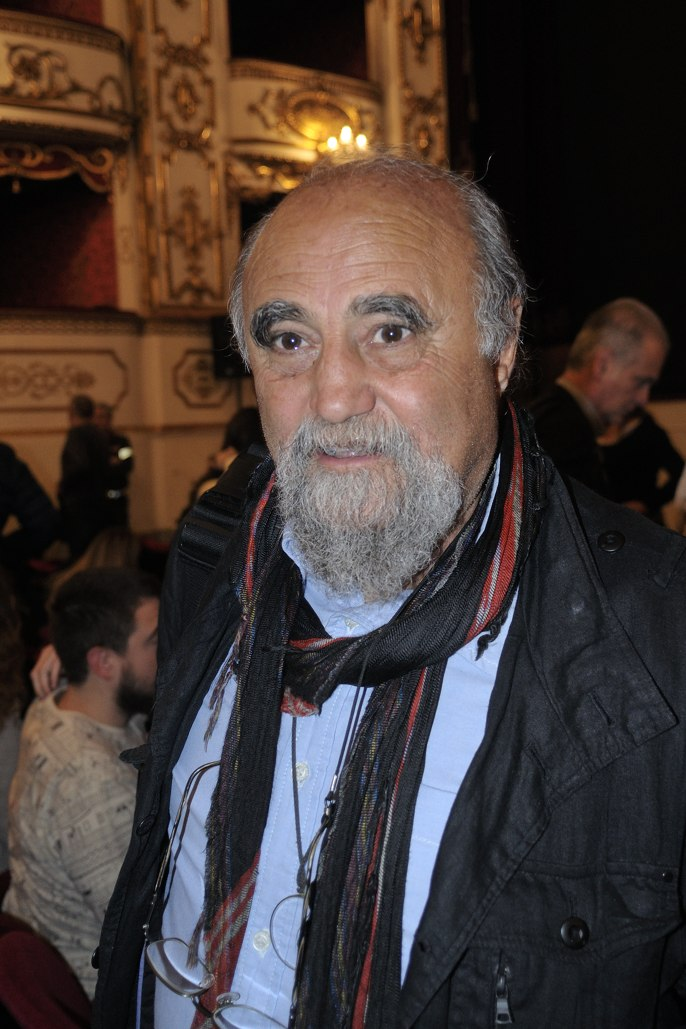
- Born: 29 March 1944; Khash, Sistan and Baluchestan Province, Imperial State of Iran
- Died: 25 April 2018 (aged 74); Paris, France
- Spouse: Melisa Teo (m. 2018)

Abbas Attar (Persian: عباس; full name: عباس عطار ʿAbbās ʿAṭṭār; 29 March 1944 – 25 April 2018), better known by his mononym Abbas, was an Iranian photographer known for his photojournalism in Biafra, Vietnam and South Africa in the 1970s, and for his extensive essays on religions in later years. He was a member of Sipa Press from 1971 to 1973, a member of Gamma from 1974 to 1980, and joined Magnum Photos in 1981.

== Career ==
Attar, an Iranian transplanted to Paris, dedicated his photographic work to the political and social coverage of the developing southern nations. Since 1970, his major works have been published in world magazines and include wars and revolutions in Biafra, Bangladesh, Ulster, Vietnam, the Middle East, Chile, Cuba, and South Africa with an essay on apartheid.

From 1978 to 1980, he photographed the revolution in Iran, and returned in 1997 after a 17-year exile. His book iranDiary 1971–2002 (2002) is a critical interpretation of its history, photographed and written as a personal diary.

From 1983 to 1986, he travelled throughout Mexico, photographing the country as if he were writing a novel. An exhibition and a book, Return to Mexico, journeys beyond the mask (1992), which includes his travel diaries, helped him define his aesthetics in photography.

From 1987 to 1994, he photographed the resurgence of Islam from the Xinjiang to Morocco. His book and exhibition Allah O Akbar, a journey through militant Islam (1994) exposes the internal tensions within Muslim societies, torn between a mythical past and a desire for modernization and democracy. The book drew additional attention after the September 11 attacks in 2001.

When the year 2000 became a landmark in the universal calendar, Christianity was the symbol of the strength of Western civilization. Faces of Christianity, a photographic journey (2000) and a touring exhibit, explored this religion as a political, a ritual and a spiritual phenomenon.

From 2000 to 2002 he worked on Animism. In our world defined by science and technology, the work looked at why irrational rituals make a strong come-back. He abandoned this project on the first anniversary of the September 11 attacks.

His book, In Whose Name? The Islamic World after 9/11 (2009), is a seven-year quest within 16 countries : opposed by governments who hunt them mercilessly, the jihadists lose many battles, but are they not winning the war to control the mind of the people, with the "creeping islamisation" of all Muslim societies?

From 2008 to 2010 Abbas travelled the world of Buddhism, photographing with the same skeptical eye for his book Les Enfants du lotus, voyage chez les bouddhistes (2011). In 2011, he began a similar long-term project on Hinduism which he concluded in 2013.

Before his death, Abbas was working on documenting Judaism around the world.

Filming for Abbas by Abbas (2020) by director Kamy Pakdel (who also served as art director for some of Abbas' books) was completed days before Abbas' death. In the film Abbas is asked how he got a particular shot and he replies “Let the photos live their lives and keep their mystery.”

He died in Paris on 25 April 2018, aged 74.

About his photography Abbas wrote:

My photography is a reflection, which comes to life in action and leads to meditation. Spontaneity – the suspended moment – intervenes during action, in the viewfinder. A reflection on the subject precedes it. A meditation on finality follows it, and it is here, during this exalting and fragile moment, that the real photographic writing develops, sequencing the images. For this reason a writer's spirit is necessary to this enterprise. Isn't photography "writing with light"? But with the difference that while the writer possesses his word, the photographer is himself possessed by his photo, by the limit of the real which he must transcend so as not to become its prisoner.

== Books ==
- Iran, la révolution confisquée, Clétrat, Paris, 1980
- Retornos a Oapan, FCE Rio de Luz, Mexico, 1986
- Return to Mexico, W. W. Norton, New York, 1992
- Allah O Akbar, voyages dans l’Islam militant, Phaidon, London, 1994
- Allah O Akbar, a journey through militant Islam, Phaidon, London, 1994
- Viaggio negli Islam del Mondo, Contrasto, Roma, 2002
- Voyage en chrétientés, La Martiniere, Paris, 2000
- Faces of Christianity, A. Abrams, New York, 2000
- Glaube-liebe-hoffnung, Knesebeck, Munchen, 2000
- IranDiary 1971–2002, Autrement, Paris, 2002
- IranDiario 1971–2005, Sagiattore, Milano, 2006
- Abbas, I Grandi Fotografi di Magnum, Hachette, Milan, 2005
- Sur la Route des Esprits, Delpire, Paris, 2005
- The children of Abraham, (exhibition catalogue), Intervalles, Paris, 2006
- In Whose Name?, Thames & Hudson, London, 2009
- Ali, le Combat, Sonatines, Paris, 2011
- Les Enfants du lotus, voyage chez les bouddhistes, De la Martinière, Paris, 2011
- Gods I've Seen, Phaidon Press Ltd, 2016

== Exhibitions ==
- 1972: Ganvie People, Falomo, Nigeria
- 1977: Retrospective, Galerie Litho, Tehran; Ce jour là, Galerie FNAC, Paris
- 1977: Le reportage d'agence, Rencontres de la Photographie, Arles, France
- 1980: Iran, the revolution, Tehran Museum of Contemporary Art; Darvazeh Ghar mosque, Tehran; Fundacao Cultural, Rio de Janeiro
- 1982: Citizen of the Third World, The Photographers' Gallery, London; Open Eye Gallery, Liverpool, G.B.
- 1983: Retrospective, Consejo de Fotogragia, Mexico; Galerie ARPA, Bordeaux, France, 1983; Imagina, Almeria, Espana, 1991
- 1986: Votez pour Moi, Magnum Gallery, Paris
- 1992: Return to Mexico, Mexico Cultural Center, Paris; Maison pour Tous, Calais; Centro Nacional de la Fotografia, Mexico, 1994
- 1999: Islamies, Place Royale, Brussels; Islamies, Arab World Institute, Paris, 1999
- 1999: Christians, Moscow House of Photography, Moscow; Eberhardskirche, Stuttgart, 1999; Centre cultural français, Seoul, Korea, 1999
- 2002: Iran, the revolution, The Grey Gallery, New York
- 2002: Viaggio negli Islam del mondo, Palazzo Vecchio, Firenze, Italia
- 2002: Visiones de l’Islam, La Caixa, Tarragona, Madrid, Malaga, Orense, Espana
- 2002: IranDiary, Visa pour l'Image, Perpignan, France
- 2003: Visiones de l’Islam, La Caixa, Girona, Granada, Pamplona and Palma de Mallorca, Espana
- 2004: Iran, Haus der Kulturen der Welt, Berlin
- 2004: Resurgence of Shias, Visa pour l'Image, Perpignan, France
- 2004: Ya Saddam, Noorderlicht, Leeuwarden, Hollande
- 2004: Islams, United Nations, New York
- 2005: Sur la Route des Esprits, La Chambre Claire, Paris
- 2006: The Children of Abraham, Nobel Peace Center, Oslo
- 2006: Islams and Shias, Vicino/Lontano, Udine, Italia
- 2007: The Children of Abraham, Groningen and Amsterdam, Holland; Institut Français de Fès, Morocco, 2008
- 2008: Jardin Botanique, Brussels, Belgium
- 2009: In Whose Name?, Magnum Gallery, Paris
- 2009: Visa pour l'Image, Perpignan, France
- 2009: Gallerie Polka, Paris
- 2011: Abbas, 45 Years in Photography, National Museum of Singapore
- 2014: Faces of Christianity, Photography Festival, Guernsey

== Honours ==
On March 29, 2024, Google recognised him with a Google Doodle.

== See also ==
- Culture of Iran
- Islamic art
- Iranian art
- List of Iranian artists
