= Gueorgui Pinkhassov =

Russian photographer (born 1953)

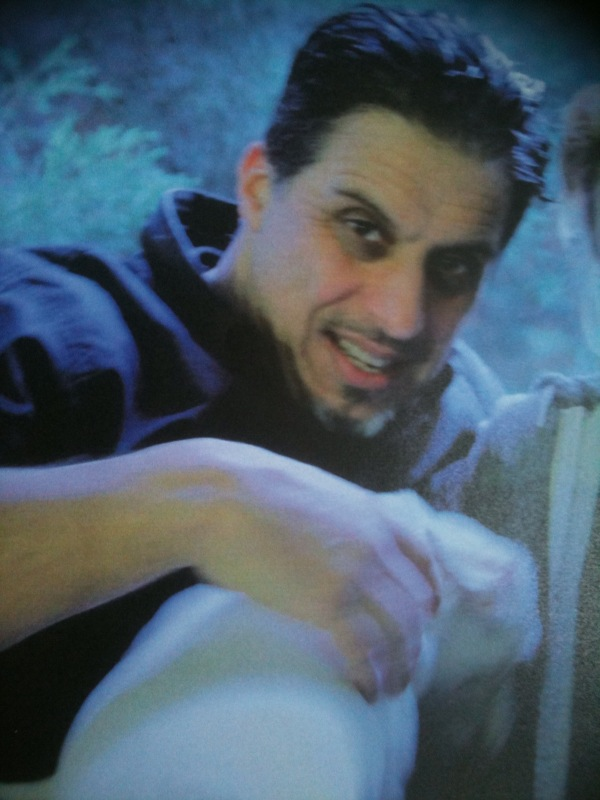
- Pinkhassov in Moscow 1998
- Born: 12 August 1953 (age 72)
- Citizenship: USSR, France
- Occupation: Photographer

Gueorgui Pinkhassov is a photographer, born in Moscow in 1953. He is a member of Magnum Photos.

== Life and work ==
Pinkhassov began his interest in photography in his teens, and enrolled at the Moscow Institute of Cinematography (VGIK) in 1969.

Following college and two years in the army, he joined the film crew at Mosfilm. Continuing his interest in still photography he became a set photographer at the studio. His work was noticed by the film director Andrei Tarkovsky, who invited Pinkhassov to work on the set of his film Stalker.

Being awarded independent artist status by the Moscow Union of Graphic Arts in 1978 allowed Pinkhassov far more freedom to travel, allowing him to exhibit his work internationally. In 1979 his work was noticed outside of Russia for the first time, in a group exhibition of Soviet photographers held in Paris. Previously, his work had mainly been seen in a number of Russian magazines, including L'artiste Sovetique.

His acceptance by the Magnum Photos agency in 1988 opened up his work to a wider audience. He worked for the international media covering major events in Lithuania, Mongolia, Indonesia and Africa. Returning to Moscow to cover the 1991 Coup, for the New York Times.

Pinkhassov is now a French citizen, living in Paris.

In 1995, he received a photographic scholarship from the city, and in 1998, he published the book Sightwalk, photographs of Japan.

== Publications ==
- 1993 Une promenade à la Défense, Édition J.C. Lattès, ISBN 2-7096-1233-X.
- 1998 Sightwalk, Phaidon, UK. ISBN 978-0-7148-3809-0.
- 2003 Carnet D’Opera. Regards en coulisses, Editeur Xavier Barral. ISBN 2-915173-02-8.
- 2006 Nordmeer, Mare, Germany.

== General references ==
- Magnum - Gueorgui Pinkhassov
- Time Asia - Gueorgui Pinkhassov
