= Constantine Manos =

American photographer (1934–2025)

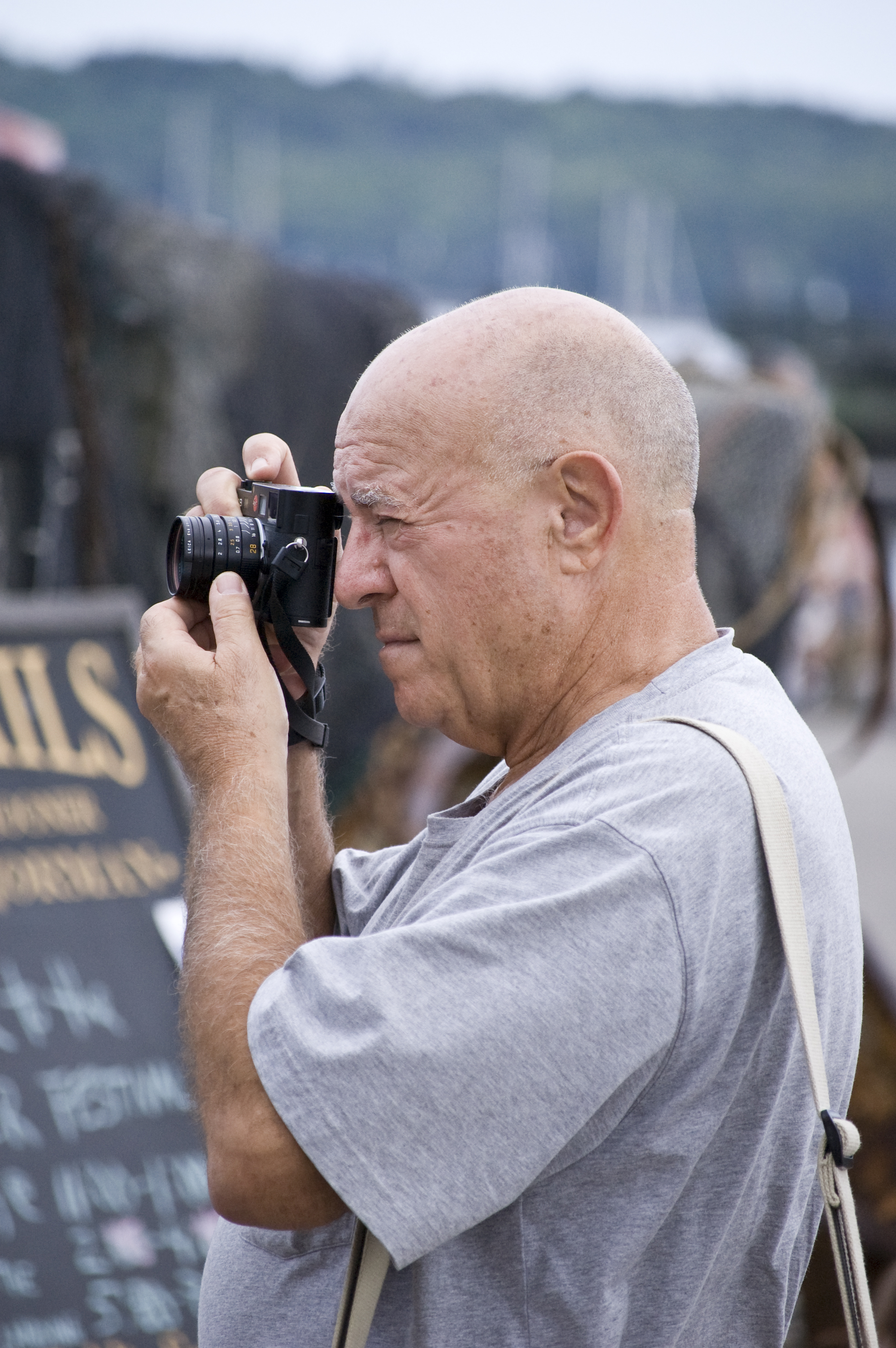
- Born: 12 October 1934; Columbia, South Carolina, U.S.
- Died: 3 January 2025 (aged 90)
- Other name: Costa
- Occupation: photographer

Constantine "Costa" Manos (October 12, 1934 – January 3, 2025) was an American photographer known for his images of Boston and Greece. His work has been published in Esquire, Life, and Look. He was a member of Magnum Photos.

== Background ==
Constantine Manos was born in Columbia, South Carolina on October 12, 1934, the son of Greek immigrant parents. He died on January 3, 2025, at the age of 90.

== Career ==
Manos first began taking photographs while in high school when he joined his school's camera club. Within a few years, he was working professionally as a photographer. At 19, Manos was hired as the official photographer for the Boston Symphony Orchestra at Tanglewood. His photographs of the orchestra culminated in 1961 with his first published work, Portrait of a Symphony.

Manos graduated from the University of South Carolina in 1955, majoring in English Literature. He served in the military and then moved to New York City, working for various magazines. From 1961 to 1964, Manos lived in Greece, photographing people and landscapes. This work resulted in A Greek Portfolio, published in 1972, which won awards at Arles and the Leipzig book fair. In 1963, Manos joined Magnum Photos and became a full member in 1965.

After his time in Greece, Manos lived in Boston. In 1974, he was hired by the city to create the photographs for the Where's Boston? exhibition, a large production in honor of Boston's 200th anniversary. The photos from that exhibit were published in the book Bostonians: Photographs from Where's Boston? Manos also worked on projects for Time-Life Books.

In 1995, American Color was published, containing Manos' recent photographs of American people. A Greek Portfolio was reissued in 1999, followed by a major exhibition of his work at the Benaki Museum in Athens. In 2003, Manos was awarded the Leica Medal of Excellence for his American Color photographs.

Manos continued to photograph with Leica cameras, and worked on material for a second American Color collection.

== Bibliography ==
- American Color 2. United States: Quantuck Lane Press, 2010. ISBN 978-1-59372-038-4
- Portrait of a Symphony 1960-2000. United States: Boston Symphony Orchestra, 2000.
- A Greek Portfolio. United States: Ilios Press, 1999. ISBN 978-0-393-04683-0
- American Color. United States: W.W. Norton, 1995. ISBN 978-0-393-03912-2
- Bostonians. United States: Cambridge Seven Associates, 1975. ASIN B000Q6RVVO
- Where's Boston?, United States: Cambridge Seven Associates, 1975.
- Suite Grecque, France: Le Chêne, 1972.
- A Greek Portfolio, United States: Studio Book/Viking Press, 1972. ASIN B001U6FOA4
- Portrait of a Symphony, United States: Basic Books, 1961. ASIN B0007DT5NI

== Collections ==
- Museum of Modern Art, New York, USA
- Art Institute of Chicago, Chicago, USA
- Museum of Fine Arts, Boston, USA
- George Eastman House, Rochester, USA
- High Museum of Art, Atlanta, USA
- Bibliothèque Nationale, Paris, France
- Houston Museum of Fine Arts, Houston, USA
- Chrysler Museum, Norfolk, USA
- Southeast Museum of Photography, Daytona Beach, USA
- Benaki Museum, Athens, Greece
- Magnum Photos Collections, Harry Ransom Center, University of Texas at Austin, USA
