= David Alan Harvey =

American photographer (born 1944)

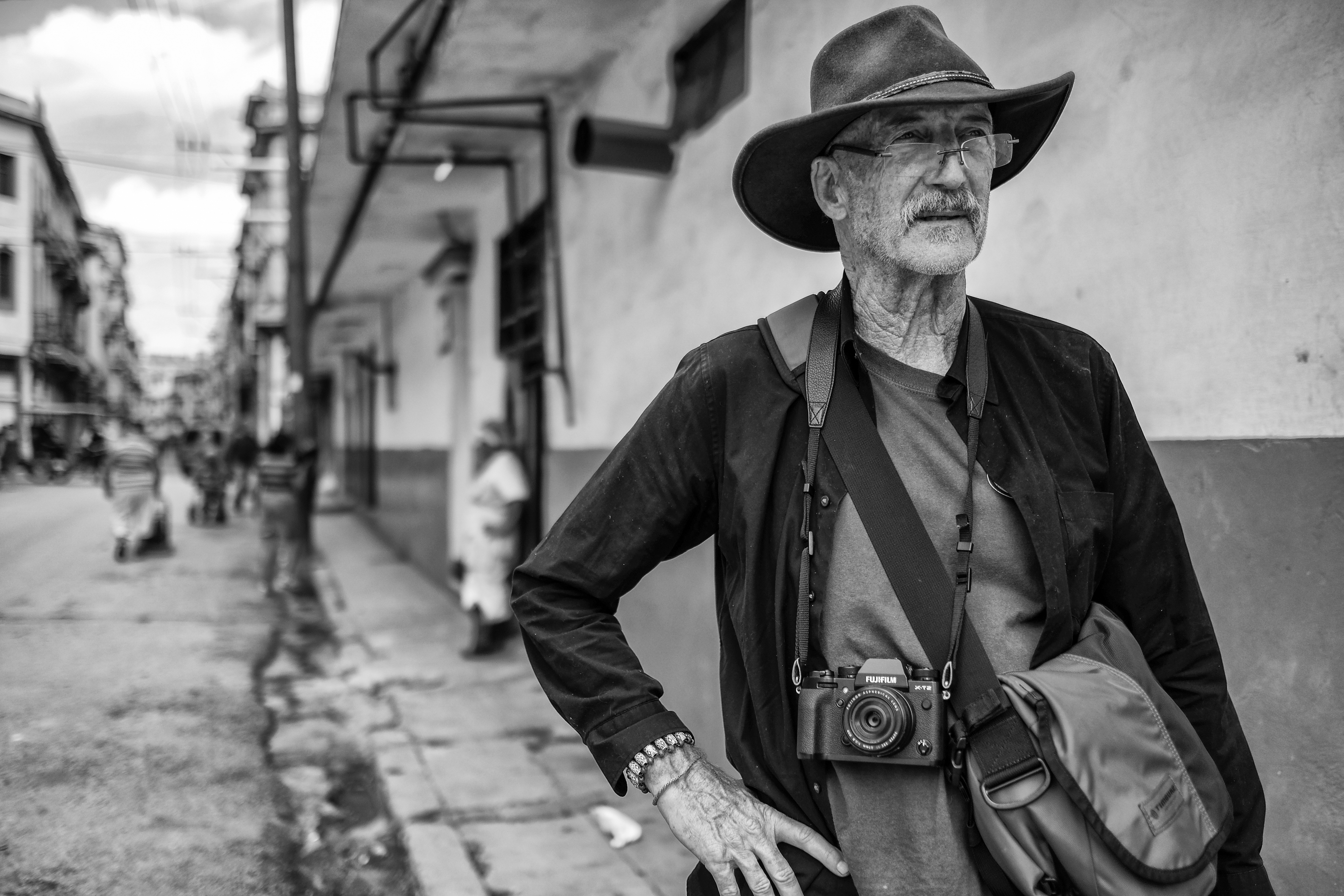
- Harvey in Havana, 2017
- Born: June 6, 1944 (age 82); San Francisco, California, U.S.
- Known for: Photography
- Website: www.davidalanharvey.com

David Alan Harvey (born June 6, 1944) is an American photographer, based in The Outer Banks, North Carolina and New York City. He was a full member of the Magnum Photos agency from 1997 to 2020 and has photographed extensively for National Geographic magazine. In 1978 Harvey was named Magazine Photographer of the Year by the National Press Photographers Association. He is the founder and curator of Burn, a website showing the work of emerging photographers.

In October 2020, Harvey's membership in Magnum was suspended for one year following an investigation into allegations that he had sexually harassed several of his female colleagues. After a second private investigation into sexual misconduct claims against Harvey, the board of Magnum voted to remove him as a member. He resigned before the meeting of the entire Magnum membership regarding the matter.

== Early life and education ==
Harvey was born in San Francisco, California and raised in Virginia. He began photographing at age 11, inspired by months of isolated convalescence as a child after contracting polio, looking out of a window on a ward as though through a viewfinder.

He completed his undergraduate degree at the Richmond branch of the College of William & Mary. He moved to Missouri, receiving his graduate degree from the Missouri School of Journalism, University of Missouri in Columbia, Missouri, in 1969.

== Career ==
In 1969 Harvey started work at The Topeka Capital-Journal in Kansas. He has worked for National Geographic magazine and was named Magazine Photographer of the Year by the National Press Photographers Association in 1978. He joined Magnum Photos as a nominee in 1993 and became a full member in 1997.

Harvey's first book, Tell It Like It Is, self-published in 1967, documented the lives of a black family living in Norfolk, Virginia. His two major books, Cuba and Divided Soul, are based on the Spanish cultural migration into the Americas, and Living Proof deals with hip-hop culture. Martin Parr and Gerry Badger say of Harvey's book (Based on a True Story) that it "takes its place as one of the best of the more extravagantly designed photobooks at a time when extravagant design is making a comeback".

One of Harvey's photographs of a father and daughter from Malaysia is included on the Voyager Golden Record.

He is founder and curator of Burn, a website showing the work of emerging photographers, launched in 2008.

He is based in The Outer Banks, North Carolina and New York City.

== Sexual misconduct allegations ==
In August 2020, the Magnum Photos website was taken offline after "issues were raised by two articles on the Fstoppers photography website, amplified on social media, which accused Magnum of promoting sexually explicit images of children, featuring nudity, and encounters with clients that the website suggested constituted a record of acts of child sexual abuse. [. . .] Much of the criticism [. . .] focused on a series of photographs by [. . .] Harvey from his time documenting sex workers in Bangkok in 1989." The accusations were made "on the basis of the tagging of some of the images." The photographic series, entitled Bangkok Prostitutes, was taken by Harvey in 1989 in Bangkok, tagged a photograph of a topless girl both "prostitution" and "teenage girl—13 to 18 years".

Following a Twitter thread by a photojournalist alleging that Harvey's sexual misconduct was an open secret, Magnum carried out a formal investigation to determine if there had been a breach of their code of conduct. He received a one-year suspension from Magnum "over a separate allegation of harassing a female colleague" in October 2020. A subsequent December 2020 article in Columbia Journalism Review detailed sexual misconduct allegations by eleven separate women including incidents where Harvey masturbated during video calls without prior consent.

As of March 17, 2021, Harvey is no longer a member of Magnum. After a private investigation into sexual misconduct claims against Harvey, the Magnum board voted to remove him as a member. Harvey chose to resign on the March 16, before the entire Magnum membership could vote on the matter.

== Awards ==
- 1978: Magazine Photographer of the Year, National Press Photographers Association
- 2005: Photographer of the Year, PMDA (PhotoImaging Manufacturers and Distributors Association)

== Publications ==
=== Publications by Harvey ===
- Tell It Like It Is. Self-published, 1967.
- America's Atlantic Isles. DC: National Geographic Society, 1981. ISBN 9780870443640.
- Cuba. Washington, DC: National Geographic Society, 2000. ISBN 978-84-8298-196-3.
- Divided Soul. London: Phaidon, 2003. ISBN 978-0-7148-4313-1.
- Living Proof. Brooklyn, NY: powerHouse, 2007. ISBN 978-1-57687-403-5.
- (Based on a True Story). Self-published / BurnBooks, 2012. Edition of 600 copies.
  - Magazine edition. Edition of 5000 copies.
- Off for a Family Drive. Self-published, 2020.

=== Publications with contributions by Harvey ===
- Home. Tokyo: Magnum Photos Tokyo, 2018. ISBN 978-4-9909806-0-3.
