= Miguel Rio Branco =

Brazilian photographer, painter, and filmmaker

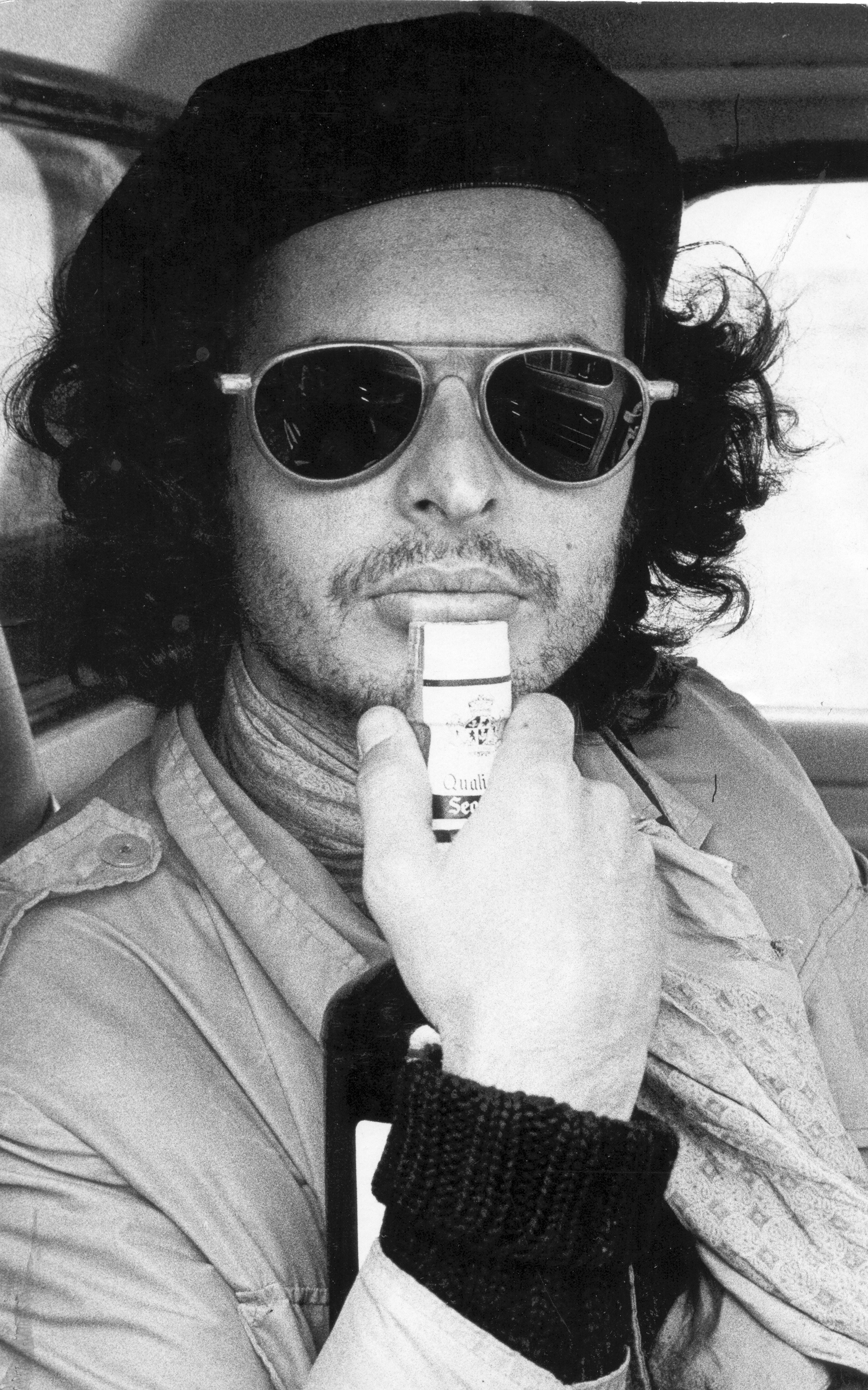
- Born: 1946 (age 79–80); Las Palmas
- Known for: photography
- Notable work: Silent Book
- Website: www.miguelriobranco.com.br

Miguel Rio Branco (born 1946) is a Brazilian photographer, painter, and filmmaker (director and cinematographer). His work has focused on Brazil and included photojournalism, and social and political criticism.

Rio Branco was an Associate Member of Magnum Photos. His photographs are included in the collections of the Museum of Modern Art and Metropolitan Museum of Art in New York.

== Life and work ==
Rio Branco was born in Las Palmas, Gran Canaria, in the Canary Islands. His parents were diplomats and he spent his childhood in Portugal, Switzerland, Brazil and the United States. In 1976 he moved to New York City, where he earned a BA, and took a one-month vocational course at the New York Institute of Photography. In 1978, he moved to Rio de Janeiro and studied at the Industrial Design College.

He became an Associate Member of Magnum Photos in 1980. He lives and works in Rio de Janeiro.

Rio Branco's Silent Book (1997) is included in Parr and Badger's The Photobook: A History, Volume II.

== Publications by Rio Branco ==
- Dulce Sudor Amargo. Mexico: Fondo de Cultura Economica, 1985. ISBN 978-9681619695.
- Nakta. Brazil: Multiprint Grafica, 1996.
- Silent Book. São Paulo: Cosac & Naify. 1997. ISBN 978-8586374210.
  - Second edition, 2012.
- Miguel Rio Branco: An Aperture Monograph. New York: Aperture, 1998. ISBN 978-0893818012.
- Pele do Tempo. Brazil: Centro de Arte Hélio Oiticica, 1999.
- Entre Los Ojos. Barcelona: Fundación "la Caixa", 1999. ISBN 978-8476646632. Text in Spanish and English.
- Miguel Río Branco habla con Teresa Siza. Conversaciones con Fotografos. La Fábrica, 2002. ISBN 978-8495471369. In Spanish.
- Entre os Olhos, o Deserto. Brazil: Cosac & Naify, 2002. ISBN 978-8575030721.
- Gritos Surdos. Portugal: Centro Portugues de Fotografia, 2002.
- Plaisir la Douleur. France: Textuel, 2005. ISBN 978-2845971691.
- Out Of Nowhere. Luste, 2009. ISBN 978-8561914103.
- Você está feliz? Cosac & Naify, 2012. ISBN 978-8540502598.
- Mechanics of Women. La Fábrica, 2017. ISBN 978-8417048051.
- New York Sketches. Xavier Barral, 2018. ISBN 978-2365111720.

== Short films by Rio Branco ==
- Trio Elétrico
- Caveirinhas
- Nada Levarei Quando Morrer = those who owe me will be charged in hell – 20 minute documentary with still and moving images
- Entre os Olhos o Deserto
- Gritos Surdos

== Collections ==
- Museum of Modern Art, New York: 37 works (as of May 2019)
- Metropolitan Museum of Art, New York: 25 works (as of May 2019)
