= Zeitenspiegel =

News agency

Zeitenspiegel Reportagen
- Industry: Print, Publishing, News
- Founded: 1976
- Founder: Uli Reinhardt
- Headquarters: Weinstadt, Germany
- Revenue: ▲€1,7 million (2008)
- Website: www.zeitenspiegel.de

Zeitenspiegel Reportagen is an agency of writers and photographers based in Weinstadt, near Stuttgart, Germany. The agency works for all of the major German magazines such as Stern, Focus, GEO, and Die Zeit, as well as international newspapers and magazines.

In 2008, Zeitenspiegel members received awards, including the Ernst Schneider Award of the German Chamber of Industry and Commerce and a first-place finish in the European Parliament Prize for Journalism. The agency’s signature style is reportage, the process of reporting news.

== Journalism Academy ==
The Zeitenspiegel-Reportageschule Günter Dahl trains the next generation of feature journalists. The Zeitenspiegel members and renowned reporters and photographers share their skills and knowledge with young people in one-year courses. The Zeitenspiegel-Reportageschule Günter Dahl was voted the second-best Journalism Academy in Germany on journalismus.com.

== Hansel Mieth Prize ==
Since 1998, Zeitenspiegel has presented annual awards to members for reporting on socially relevant themes in memory of its honorary member Johanna "Hansel" Mieth (1909-1998) of Santa Rosa, California. The Hansel Mieth Prize is presented to a reporter-photographer team for a completed feature in German, published or unpublished. The Hansel Mieth Prize is one of the most important honors in German journalism; text and photos are judged equally, in terms of the quality of journalism and social relevance. In 2022, the prize was 6,000 euros.

Up-and-coming journalists can also compete for the annual Gabriel Grüner Grant, which funds research on an exceptionally promising story.
