= Guy Le Querrec =

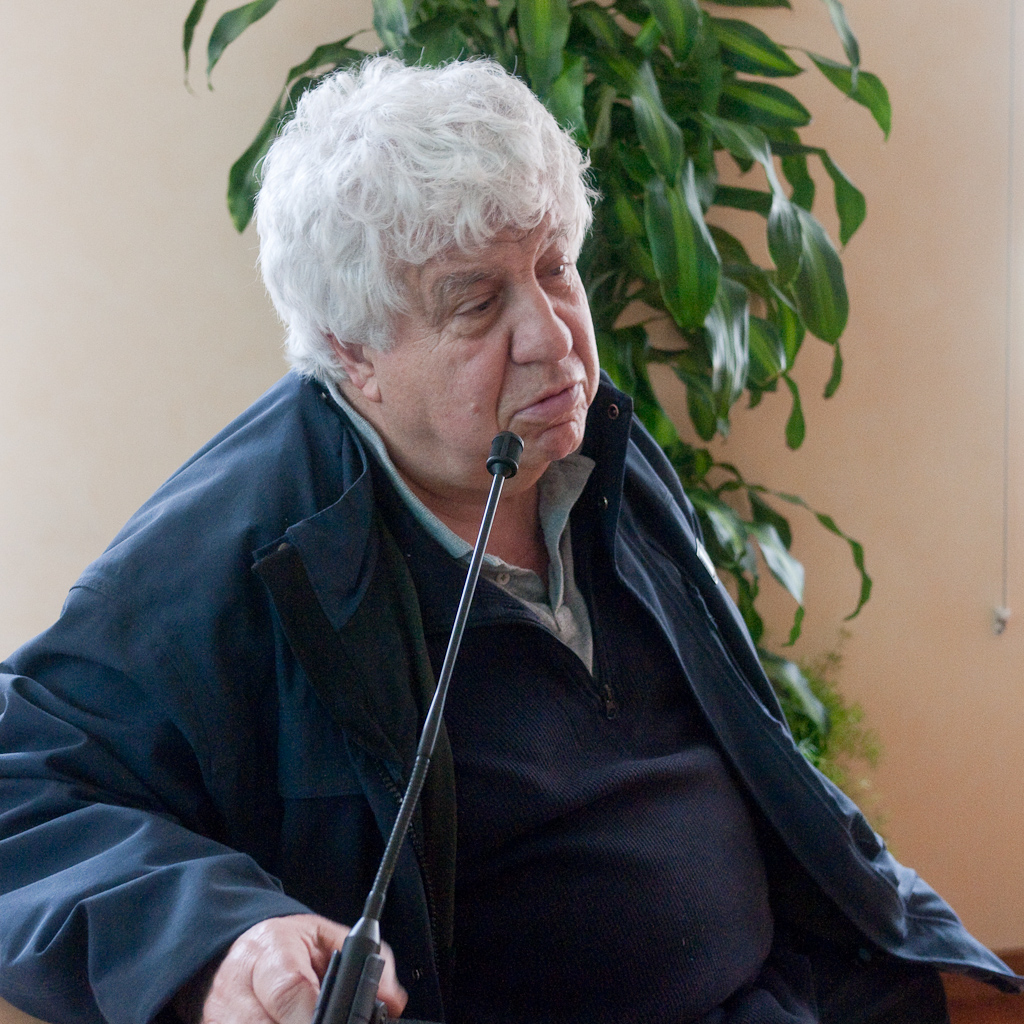
Guy Le Querrec

Guy Le Querrec (born 1941 in Paris, France) is a French photographer and filmmaker, noted for his documentary images of jazz musicians. He is a member of Magnum Photos.

== Career ==
Le Querrec took his first photographs as a teenager using a basic Fex/Indo Ultra-Fex, buying second hand soon after another and more sophisticated bakelite 6 x 9 cm Photax viewfinder camera, in 1955. He shot his first pictures of jazz musicians in London in the late 1950s. After having served in the army, he became a professional in 1967, and then worked as a picture editor and photographer for Jeune Afrique magazine, working in francophone Africa, including Chad, Cameroon, Niger, and Central African Republic. In 1971 he gave his archives to Agence Vu, founded by Pierre de Fenoyl and then co-founded Viva (photo agency), with Martine Franck, Hervé Gloaguen, and others. In 1976, he joined Magnum Photos.

In the late 1970s he began directing films, working with Robert Bober. In 1983 at the Rencontres d'Arles he experimented with projecting images while a jazz quartet played.

Besides having photographed numerous jazz festivals and African subjects, Le Querrec has traveled to China and documented American Indians. He has documented Villejuif, a suburb of Paris, as well as the Carnation Revolution in Portugal. He has also taught many photography workshops in France.

== Filmography ==
- Un repas de famille, 1979, Institut national de l'audiovisuel, Paris, France
- Les nouveaux créateurs (The New Creators), 1978, TF1, France
- La batterie... vous rappelez pas? 1979, Institut national de l'audiovisuel
- L'oeil au papier de perre, 1979, FR3, France
- Chasse à l’homme, 1981, TF1, France
- Le voyage de Rose, 1982
- L’ennemi intérieur, 1983, FR3, France
- Une minute pour une image (One Minute for One Image), 1983
- Jazz Impressions, 1984
- La Republique nous appelle, 1984, FR3, France

== Bibliography ==
- Quelque Part, Paris, France: Contrejour, 1977, ISBN 978-2-85949-009-6
- Portugal 1974-1975 : Regards sur une tentative de pouvoir populaire, France: Hier & Demain, 1979
- Jazz sous les platanes, Vitrolles, France: Editions Java, 1984
- Tête à tête : Daniel Druet, un Sculpteur et ses modèles, France: Carrère, 1988
- Musicales, Amiens, France: Trois Cailloux, 1991
- Jazz comme une image, Banlieues Bleues, Paris, France: Scandéditions, 1993
- Carnet de Routes, Paris, France: Label bleu, 1995
- Jazz de J à ZZ, Paris, France: Marval, 1996, ASIN B004DKQZS4
- François Mitterrand : des temps de pose à l'Elysée, Paris, France: Marval, 1997, ISBN 978-2-86234-229-0
- Suites Africaines, Carnet de Routes, France: Label bleu, 1999
- Jazz Light and Day, Italy: Federico Motta Editore, 2001
- On the Trail to Wounded Knee: The Big Foot Memorial Ride, USA: Lyons Press, 2002, ISBN 978-1-58574-533-3
- African Flashback, France: Label bleu, 2005

== Recent exhibitions ==
- Big Foot Trail, 2002, Gallery Hermès, New York City, USA
- JAZZ de J à ZZ, 2002, Centro de la Imagen, Braga, Portugal
- Rencontres internationales de d’jazz, 2003, Nevers, France
- JAZZ de J à ZZ, 2003, L’Espal, Le Mans, France
- L'oeil de l'elephant, 2006, Rencontres d'Arles, France

== Awards ==
- Grand Prix de la Ville de Paris, 1998
