= Eve Arnold =

American photojournalist (1912–2012)

- Born: Eve Cohen; April 21, 1912; Philadelphia, Pennsylvania, U.S.
- Died: January 4, 2012 (aged 99); London, England
- Occupation: Photojournalist
- Spouse: Arnold Arnold (divorced)
- Children: 1
- Website: evearnold.com

Eve Arnold, OBE (honorary), FRPS (honorary) (née Cohen; April 21, 1912 – January 4, 2012) was an American photojournalist and long time resident of Mayfair in the UK. She joined Magnum Photos agency in 1951, and became a full member in 1957. She was the first woman to join the agency. She frequently photographed and was trusted by Marilyn Monroe, her work included candid-style photos on the set and post set of The Misfits (1961). Marilyn had invited Arnold, to John F. Kennedy's birthday party, to photograph her singing but she was too exhausted from other work to attend and always regretted declining the commission.

== Early life and career ==
A photo taken by Eve Arnold in 1950, titled Charlotte Stribling Stretching.

Eve Cohen was born in Philadelphia, the fifth of nine children of immigrant Russian-Jewish parents, William Cohen (born Velvel Sklarski), a rabbi, and his wife, Bessie (Bosya Laschiner). Both of Arnold's parents grudgingly accepted her choice to abandon medicine to study photography. She married Arnold Schmitz (later Arnold Arnold) in 1941. Her interest in photography began in 1946 while working for Kodak at their Fair Lawn, New Jersey photo-finishing plant. Using a gifted Rolleicord, she began to photograph the city with a fresh humanitarian perspective. Over six weeks in 1948, she learned photographic skills from Harper's Bazaar art director Alexey Brodovitch at the New School for Social Research in Manhattan. Studying photography under Brodovitch, she produced a collection of photos from Harlem's vivid fashion show scene. The collection was published the series in the London Illustrated Picture Post in 1951. Although the series launched her career, she later wrote in a diary entry that the editor of the magazine changed her captions and reversed the message of her photographs to fit a racist narrative. She then became interested in African American migrant workers suffering housing discrimination in Long Island. She became the first woman to join the Magnum Agency, becoming a full member in 1957. Arnold spent time covering Republican Party press events, the McCarthy hearings, and explored the subject of birth which was taboo. She was well aware of the underrepresentation of women photojournalists and the position of women celebrities in the public eye. Arnold explored these ideas about women in her full length photo book The Unretouched Woman which was published in 1976.

Arnold's images of Marilyn Monroe on the set of The Misfits (1961) were perhaps her most memorable, but she had taken many photos of Monroe from 1951 onwards. The intimate candid-style photos achieve Arnold's goal to show Monroe's anxieties about being the subject of constant media attention. She befriended Monroe, Joan Crawford, and many other subjects in order to write about them and photograph them better. Her previously unseen photos of Monroe were shown at a Halcyon Gallery exhibition in London during May 2005. Travel characterized much of Arnold's work, as she took interest in photographing the Civil rights and Black power movements in the United States as well as in the rigid Soviet Union and in China. Arnold always strived to go deeper with her photography; she even returned from some shoots with cigarette burns on her clothing from a disapproving crowd. She produced a film in 1971, Women Behind the Veil, focusing on Arabian harems and hammams.

She also photographed famous figures such as Queen Elizabeth II, Malcolm X, Marlene Dietrich, and Joan Crawford, and traveled around the world, photographing in China, Russia, South Africa and Afghanistan. Arnold left the United States and moved permanently to England in the early 1970s with her son, Francis Arnold. Several of her famous photographs were featured in Look, Life, Esquire, Harper's Bazaar, Geo, Stern, Paris-Match, and Epoca. While working for the London Sunday Times, she began to make serious use of color photography. However, Arnold's preference continued to be black and white. She alternated between taking glamorous photos of cinema stars and portraits of everyday life and experiences. The hardest task for Arnold was to make the mundane interesting. Her interest in "the poor, the old, the underdog" continued as her photos captured the gentle realness that Arnold portrays as characteristic of all humans. The relationship of trust between Arnold and her subjects is visible in the natural lighting and posing in her photographs.

== Later life ==
In 1980, she had her first solo exhibition, which featured her photographic work done in China at the Brooklyn Museum in New York City. In the same year, she received the Lifetime Achievement Award from the American Society of Magazine Photographers. In 1993, she was made an Honorary Fellow of the Royal Photographic Society, and elected Master Photographer by New York's International Center of Photography. Arnold was one of only five women in the catalogued touring exhibition Magna Brava. Rejected as a Vietnam War photographer, she found photographing South African shanty towns also critiqued and drew awareness to the injustices in the world. She also photographed disabled veterans, herders in Mongolia, and women in brothels.

In 1960, Arnold did a series of portraits of American First Ladies including Jackie Kennedy, Lady Bird Johnson, and Pat Nixon. In 1997, she was appointed a member of the Advisory Committee of the National Media Museum (formerly the Museum of Photography, Film & Television) in Bradford, West Yorkshire. She was appointed an Honorary Officer of the Order of the British Empire (OBE) in 2003.

She lived in Mayfair for many years until her last illness, when she moved to a nursing home in St George's Square, Pimlico. When Anjelica Huston asked if she was still doing photography, Arnold replied: "That's over. I can't hold a camera any more." She said she spent most of her time reading such writers as Fyodor Dostoevsky, Thomas Mann and Leo Tolstoy. One of her last photos is of her grandson when he came to visit her for a photography lesson in 1994. She describes in her diary entry of that day the bond between photographer, subject, and camera that is necessary for a portrait. She continued to stress her style of simplicity in photos with natural lighting and lack of posing and embellishments. She sums up "curiosity" as a one-word description of her driving force that led to her career of which was described as a friend as "a one-woman cultural exchange".

== Death ==
Arnold died in a London nursing home, on January 4, 2012, aged 99, survived by her only child, her son Frank and grandchildren.

== Selected works ==
=== Photographs ===
- Fashion Show, behind the scenes, 1950
- Marilyn Monroe, 1960.
- Jacqueline Kennedy arranging flowers with daughter Caroline, 1961.
- Horse Training for the Militia in Inner Mongolia, 1979.

=== Books ===
- The Unretouched Woman, 1976.
- Flashback: The 50s, Knopf, 1978.
- In China, Knopf, 1980.
- In America, Knopf, 1983.
- The Making of the White Nights, 1985
- Marilyn Monroe: An Appreciation, Knopf, 1987.
- All in a Day's Work, Bantam, 1989.
- The Great British, Knopf, 1991.
- In Retrospect, Knopf, 1995.
- Film Journal, Bloomsbury, 2002.
- Handbook, 2005
- Marilyn Monroe 2005
- Eve Arnold's People 2010
- All About Eve, 2012

== Awards ==
- Honorary Degree of Doctor of Science, University of St. Andrews, Scotland, 1997.
- Honorary Degree of Doctor of Letters, Staffordshire University.
- Doctor of Humanities, Richmond, the American International University in London.
- Master Photographer, International Center of Photography, NYC.
- Honorary Officer of the Order of the British Empire (OBE) by the British Government.
- Lifetime Achievement Award, the Sony World Photography Awards, 2010.
- National Book Award for In China, 1980
