= Trolley Books =

- Founded: 2001
- Founder: Gigi Giannuzzi
- Country of origin: United Kingdom
- Headquarters location: London
- Distribution: Innovative Logistics (US); Orca Book Services (UK)
- Publication types: Books
- Nonfiction topics: art and photography
- Official website: www.trolleybooks.com

Trolley Books is an independent UK publisher, specialising in art and photography books. Areas covered by Trolley include social reportage, photojournalism/current affairs and contemporary art and architecture.

Founded in September 2001 by Gigi Giannuzzi and based in Fitzrovia, London, Trolley Books concentrates on producing documentary photography books. It is "known for its controversial and left-of-centre exhibitions and photography and art books"

Trolley Books is the publishing arm of a family that also includes the Trolley Charitable Trust, whose aim is to support long term photographic projects which result in a Trolley publication, and TJ Boulting, the exhibition space on Riding House Street run by directors Gigi Giannuzzi and Hannah Watson.

== Publications ==
Trolley Books have worked closely with, and published the work of, several Magnum Photos photographers including Chien-Chi Chang, Werner Bischof, Carl De Keyzer, Thomas Dworzak, Alex Majoli, Paolo Pellegrin, Ilkka Uimonen, and most notably Philip Jones Griffiths. Major publications include Recollections and Agent Orange by Philip Jones Griffiths, Homeland and Purple Hearts: Back from Iraq by Nina Berman, Kurds – Through The Photographer’s Lens by the KHRP and the Delfina Foundation, Chernobyl – The Hidden Legacy by Pierpaolo Mittica and New Londoners – Reflections on Home by the charity Photovoice in association with 12 young refugees, living in London.

Trolley published Delta Nigeria: The Rape of Paradise by George Osodi, The Only House Left Standing by Tom Hurndall, and A Million Shillings: Escape from Somalia by Alixandra Fazzina, which won the Nansen Refugee Award.

The majority of Trolley's publications are categorised as photojournalism, but the company has also produced contemporary art books, for example several works by Nick Waplington including Double Dactyl (2008), Paul Fryer and Damien Hirst's: Don’t Be So… (2002) and Laureana Toledo's The Limit (2009).

Trolley published its first fiction title, The Hardy Tree by Iphgenia Baal in 2011, followed by Baal’s second book of short stories, Gentle Art in 2012.

== Awards ==
- Rencontres d'Arles 2003, Hide That Can by Deirdre O’Callaghan was awarded the Prix du Livre
- 19th Annual ICP Infinity Awards 2003, Alex Majoli (author/photographer of Leros, 2003) was awarded the Photojournalism Category for News or Documentary Projects and Hide That Can by Deirdre O’Callaghan was awarded the Publication category
- Pictures of the Year International 2003, The Chain won the Best Photography Book, Leros was given the Judges’ Special Recognition
- Photo District News Annual 2003, Leros and The Chain were included in the Best Books category
- Photo-Eye Awards 2003, The Chain nominated in the Best Photography Books category
- Making Art Work: The Mike Smith Studio ed. Patsy Craig was shortlisted for the Historians of British Art Book Prize 2005
- American Photography Awards 2004, both Agent Orange by Philip Jones Griffiths and Open Wound: Chechnya 1993-2004 by Stanley Greene were selected as two of the ten Best Photography Books of the year
- Photo District News Annual 2004, Ghetto by Adam Broomberg and Oliver Chanarin and Zona by Carl de Keyzer were included in the Best Books category
- World Press Photo 2004, Stanley Greene was awarded the World Press Photo Award in the Daily Life Story category for Open Wound: Chechnya 1994-2003
- Days Japan International Photojournalism Awards 2005, Nina Berman awarded Second Prize for Purple Hearts: Back from Iraq.
- World Press Photo 2005, Nina Berman was awarded 2nd prize in the Portraits Series section for Purple Hearts: Back from Iraq
