= Deca (journalism collective) =

Journalism cooperative of magazine writers

- Type: Cooperative
- Industry: Journalism
- Founded: 2014
- Founder: Sonia Faleiro, Stephan Faris, McKenzie Funk, Vanessa M. Gezari, Marc Herman, Mara Hvistendahl, Delphine Schrank, Tom Zoellner and Donovan Hohn
- Headquarters: Worldwide
- Website: www.decastories.com

Deca is a cooperative of magazine writers co-owned and managed by its members. Their cooperative model is based on photo agencies like Magnum and NOOR. Each journalist reports and writes independently but stories are edited and promoted collectively. Their writers are based all over the world, including Rome, London, Shanghai, Barcelona, Beirut, Abu Dhabi, Los Angeles, New York, Seattle, and Washington, D.C. Collectively, they have reported from more than 90 countries and every continent but Antarctica. Deca's tagline is "The world, firsthand." They offer a subscription service to their stories as well as an iOS app, with an Android app in development. Readers can also purchase the stories for download as Kindle singles on Amazon.com.

== History ==
Deca launched in June 2014 with the story "And The City Swallowed Them" by Mara Hvistendahl and a Kickstarter campaign that raised $32,627.

== And The City Swallowed Them ==
"And The City Swallowed Them" is Deca's debut story, written by Mara Hvistendahl, published in June, 2014. It is a true crime nonfiction story about the murder of 22-year-old model Diana O'brien in Shanghai on July 6, 2008 based on dozens of interviews with investigators, models, and both the victim's and the convicted murderer's families. The short book touches on issues of urbanization, migration and underground economies, anchored by the narrative of the lives of the Diana O'Brien and her murderer. The Wall Street Journal, China Real Time blog wrote about the book: "And The City Swallowed Them looks at the world that brought two different kinds of newcomers together—foreigners, including young models fighting for emerging opportunities in high fashion, and China’s own migrants, including those traveling from poor villages who were willing to go to desperate measures to scrape together their own living.”

Hvistendahl is the author of the Pulitzer Prize finalist book Unnatural Selection: Choosing Boys Over Girls, and the Consequences of a World Full of Men.

== Homelands ==
"Homelands" is Deca's second story, written by Stephan Faris, published in July, 2014. It was reprinted on Longform.org and excerpted on Roads and Kingdoms. Following in the tradition of George Orwell’s “Marrakech” and, more recently, Ta-Nehisi Coates’s case for reparations in The Atlantic, "Homelands" is an essay exploring the global migration crisis and calling for open borders. It draws on the reporter's experiences in Liberia, Kenya, Italy and South Africa while working for magazines such as Time, Bloomberg Businessweek, and The Atlantic. The narrative opens and concludes with the story of a Liberian orphan named Patience who is adopted by American parents. A large part of the essay focuses on the parallels between the global migration crisis and South Africa's apartheid regime. It examines the economic, social and moral implications of restricting people's movements based on where they were born.

Faris is the author of Forecast: The Surprising—and Immediate—Consequences of Climate Change.

== Come See the Mountain ==
"Come See the Mountain" is Deca's third story, written by Tom Zoellner, published in December, 2014. It centers around the idea of "dark eco-tourism," the environmental version of dark tourism, where people pay to witness environmental degradation. The short book focuses mostly on a firsthand account of visiting the popular tourist destination and extremely dangerous Cerro Rico mine in Potosí, Bolivia, where hundreds of people die in collapses and explosions every year. It also reflects on the centuries of colonial exploitation that led up to the mine becoming a tourist attraction. The book touches on other similar phenomenons of "dark eco-tourism", including taking cruises to watch glaciers melt, flights over the Great Pacific Garbage Patch and bus tours through New Orlean's Lower Ninth Ward, which was devastated by Hurricane Katrina. The story explores issues surrounding the unintended consequences of development, colonialism and waste in the Global North on the Global South. Deca's website describes the book as a "journey into the guilty heart of progress".

Zoellner is the author of five books, including Uranium: War, Energy, and the Rock That Shaped the World.

== The Wreck of the Kulluk ==
"The Wreck of the Kulluk" is Deca's fourth story, written by McKenzie Funk, published in January, 2015. An excerpt of the book was published in the New York Times Magazine on December 30, 2014. The book is an account of the wreck of the Kulluk, a drill barge that was used for oil exploration in Arctic waters by the Royal Dutch Shell oil company. As easily accessible sources of oil become few and far between, Shell has invested $6 billion to push into more remote and dangerous places in pursuit of oil, sparking debate about unnecessary environmental and human risks. The story draws from dozens of interviews in Alaska and hundreds of pages of Coast Guard reports and oil industry documents. With a detailed account of the events leading up to the wreck and how the disaster unfolded, it explores the new frontier of energy everywhere from the cockpits of rescue helicopters in the Arctic to Washington D.C. to oil company boardrooms. Rachel Maddow called the book "riveting" in her May 15, 2015 segment on drilling in the Arctic.

Funk is the author of Windfall: The Booming Business of Global Warming.

== 13 Men ==
"13 Men" is Deca's fifth story, written by Sonia Faleiro, published in February, 2015. The book draws on court documents, several witness accounts and an exclusive interview with the victim of a gang-rape in a small village in West Bengal. The piece explores the intersection of violence against women and the marginalization of ethnic minorities in India. It gives a graphic account of the incident reconstructed from the victims recollection, interviews, police reports and photographs recovered during the investigation. In a detailed, narrative style it retraces the precise timeline of the circumstances surrounding the crime as well as the history of the village where it took place, exploring the complicated dynamics at play when someone is victimized by a community that has also been subjected to decades of violence, damaging stereotypes and oppression from society at large. A review in Mint called it "narrative non-fiction at its most powerful." Faleiro is the author of Beautiful Thing: Inside the Secret World of Bombay's Dance Bars.

== The Wizard and the Volcano ==
"The Wizard and the Volcano" is Deca's sixth book, written by Marc Herman, published in April, 2015. The book revolves around the wizard of Mount Merapi in Java, Indonesia, a mystic figure who refuses to obey an evacuation order for an impending volcanic eruption. As conditions in temporary evacuation camps become cramped and increasingly desperate, disaster strikes unexpectedly where only the wizard had predicted and thousands of evacuated residents begin returning to their abandoned homes and livelihoods in the danger zone of the active volcano. Through the lens of interviews with the wizard, NGO reports, local legends and firsthand reporting over the course of the eruption, the book explores the role of foreign aid, government, local authorities and history in shaping how a high-stakes crisis unfolds in a disaster-prone country. The book was published on the two-hundred-year anniversary of the largest volcanic blast in recorded history, Indonesia's deadly Tambora eruption in April 1815.

Herman covered the Libyan revolution for The Atlantic and is the author of The Shores of Tripoli.

== Godfathers and Thieves ==
"Godfathers and Thieves" is Deca's seventh book, written by Elizabeth Dickinson, published in September, 2015. It chronicles the efforts of members of the Syrian diaspora to "crowd-fund" the opposition fighting Bashir-al Assad in the Syrian civil war. The story follows exiled Syrian businessman Mezyan Al Barazi and a network of compatriots over several years as they navigate the hurdles of getting money and supplies to the rebels, hoping to quickly overthrow the government. An increasingly complicated conflict that escalates quickly from protests to fighting means they must face decisions about whether or not to support armed conflict in absentia. Through dozens of interviews and other primary sources the book reveals wide, covert, sometimes foreign government-backed networks of Syrians abroad who are funding the war. It also examines the nuanced unity found for the members of these alliances, who may not have been united if they had not been living in exile during the war.

Dickinson is the author of the book Who Shot Ahmed: A Mystery Unravels in Bahrain's Botched Arab Spring.

== The Calypso Killing ==
"The Calypso Killing" is Deca's eighth book, written by Tom Zoellner, published in March, 2016. The story centers around the island of Trinidad and Tobago, in the midst of a drug war, where the assassination of star prosecutor Dana Seetahal shocked the country. On May 4, 2014, at 12:05 am, Seetahal was assassinated while driving her Volkswagen Touareg SUV in the vicinity of the Woodbrook Youth Club, Port of Spain, Trinidad. She was shot 5 times. Her death raised conspiracy theories about Colombian drug cartels, Venezuelan arms smugglers and a local religious community with a secret political agenda. The story also documents the FBI's involvement, when the murder became more than a local matter, and the hunt for Dana Seetahal's killers became a case of misdirection and double meanings. While 11 men were charged with the crime in July, 2015 they have not yet been convicted.

Zoellner is the author of five books, including Uranium: War, Energy, and the Rock That Shaped the World.

== Member list ==
Name	Nationality	Country of Residence	Status	Active years
Sonia Faleiro	India	United Kingdom and India	Active (Founding Member)	2014–
Stephan Faris	United States	Italy	Active (Founding Member)	2014–
McKenzie Funk	United States	United States	Active (Founding Member)	2014–
Vanessa M. Gezari	United States	United States	Active (Founding Member)	2014–
Marc Herman	United States	Spain	Active (Founding Member)	2014–
Mara Hvistendahl	United States	China	Active (Founding Member)	2014–
Delphine Schrank	United States and France	United States	Active (Founding Member)	2014–
Tom Zoellner	United States	United States	Active (Founding Member)	2014–
Donovan Hohn	United States	United States	Withdrawn	2014–2014
Rania Abouzeid	Australia and Lebanon	Lebanon	Active (Full Member)	2014–
Elizabeth Dickinson	United States	United States	Active (Full Member)	2014–

== Criticism ==
An article in the Columbia Journalism Review offered this criticism of the Deca model: "I found myself wondering if this really is a better arrangement for freelancers who feel exploited by traditional magazines. Sure, I might have to work harder to sell editors on my ideas or agree to tweak my initial pitch to their specifications, but at least I have a contract for a guaranteed amount of money that doesn’t fluctuate based on how many people read my work or purchase the magazine that week. Deca plans on publishing nonfiction stories of about 10,000 words each. For its writers to come anywhere close to earning a mainstream magazine’s per-word rate, every single one of its stories is going to have to be a massive hit. Even top-selling Kindle Singles are more useful in generating an audience for journalism than they are in generating revenue."
