= Ilkka Uimonen =

Finnish photographer and photojournalist

Ilkka Mikael Uimonen (born 1966) is a Finnish photographer who has worked as a photojournalist. Uimonen's book Cycles, on Israeli–Palestinian violence, was published in 2004. He has won awards from Pictures of the Year International and World Press Photo.

== Life and work ==
Uimonen has been a photographer since the early 1990s, specifically 1992. His work has focussed heavily on conflict photography, most notably the Israeli-Palestinian conflict, which formed the basis of his 2004 book Cycles. He became a nominee member of Magnum Photos in 2002 and has worked as a contract photographer for Newsweek.. His photojournalism has earned multiple awards from World Press Photo and Pictures of the Year International. In 2014 he directed Regarding Lower Manhattan, a 25-minute documentary.

== Publications ==
=== Publications by Uimonen ===
- Cycles. London: Trolley, 2004. ISBN 978-1904563365.

=== Publications with others ===
- Off Broadway: Magnum Photographers: Christopher Anderson, Antoine D'Agata, Thomas Dworzak, Alex Majoli, Paolo Pellegrin, Ilkka Uimonen. London: Trolley, 2009. ISBN 978-1904563808.

== Short films ==
- Regarding lower Manhattan (2014) – documentary, 25 mins

== Exhibitions ==
- Nazar - Western eyes, Noorderlicht, Groningen, Netherlands, September–October 2004.
- Off Broadway, New York City, 2004; Rencontres d'Arles, Arles, France, 2005. With Thomas Dworzak, Alex Majoli and Paolo Pellegrin.
- Statue, part of Red Fall, Station Museum of Contemporary Art, Houston, TX, October 2004 – February 2005. With others.

== Awards ==
- Second prize stories, General News category, World Press Photo, 2000 contest
- First Place, General Division / News Picture Story, 58th Pictures of the Year International, 2001, for "The Visit"
- Third Place, General Division / General News, 58th Pictures of the Year International, 2001, for "Ariel Sharon Visit"
- Award of Excellence, Magazine Division / Global News, 58th Pictures of the Year International, 2001, for "Chest"
- Award of Excellence, Magazine Division / Issue Reporting Picture Story, 58th Pictures of the Year International, 2001, for "Water Crisis in India"
- Second prize stories, Spot News category, World Press Photo, 2003 contest
- First Place, 60th Pictures of the Year International, 2003, for "Palestinian Informer's Fate"
- Third prize stories, Spot News category, World Press Photo, 2004 contest
