= Stanley Greene =

American photojournalist (1949–2017)

- Born: February 14, 1949; Brooklyn, New York, U.S.
- Died: May 19, 2017 (aged 68); Paris, France
- Education: School of Visual Arts, New York; San Francisco Art Institute
- Occupation: Photojournalist
- Agent: NOOR photo agency

Stanley Greene Jr. (February 14, 1949 – May 19, 2017) was an American photojournalist.

== Life and career ==
Greene was born to middle class parents in Brooklyn. Both his parents were actors. His father, Stanley Greene Sr., born in Harlem, was a union organizer, one of the first African Americans elected as an officer in the Screen Actors Guild, and belonged to the Harlem Renaissance movement. Greene's father was blacklisted as a Communist in the 1950s and forced to take uncredited parts in movies. Of these small roles, perhaps his most well-known was as Uncle Henry in The Wiz (1978). Greene's parents gave him his first camera when he was eleven years old.

Greene began his art career as a painter, but started taking photos as a means of cataloging material for his paintings. In 1971, when Greene was a member of the anti–Vietnam War movement and the Black Panther Party, his friend photographer W. Eugene Smith offered him space in his studio and encouraged him to study photography at the School of Visual Arts in New York and the San Francisco Art Institute.

Greene held various jobs as a photographer, including taking pictures of rock bands and working at Newsday. In 1986, he shot fashion photographs in Paris. He called himself a "dilettante, sitting in cafes, taking pictures of girls and doing heroin". After a friend died of AIDS, Greene kicked his drug habit and began to seriously pursue a photography career.

He began photojournalism in 1989, when his image ("Kisses to All, Berlin Wall") of a tutu-clad girl with a champagne bottle became a symbol of the fall of the Berlin Wall. While working for the Paris-based photo agency Agence Vu in October 1993, Greene was trapped and almost killed in the White House in Moscow during a stand-off between President Boris Yeltsin and the parliament. He covered the war-torn countries Azerbaijan, Bosnia and Herzegovina, Georgia, Iraq, Somalia, Croatia, Kashmir, and Lebanon. He took pictures of the genocide in Rwanda in 1994 and the US Gulf Coast in the aftermath of Hurricane Katrina in 2005.

After 1994, Greene was best known for his documentation of the conflict in Chechnya, between rebels and the Russian Armed Forces, which was compiled in his 2004 book, Open Wound. These photos drew attention to the "suffering that has marked the latest surge in Chechnya's centuries-long struggle for independence from Russia".

In 2008, Greene revealed that he had hepatitis C, which he believed he had contracted from a contaminated razor while working in Chad in 2007. After controlling the disease with medication, he traveled to Afghanistan and photographed a story about "the crisis of drug abuse and infectious disease".

Stanley Greene co-founded NOOR Agency with fellow photojournalist Kadir van Lohuizen in 2007. They launched their agency with their colleagues on September 7, 2007, at Visa Pour L'Image. Greene died in Paris, at the age of 68. He had been undergoing treatment for liver cancer.

== Bibliography ==
- Somnambule. With Delacorta. Distributed Art Publishers. 1993. ISBN 978-2862340586.
- Open Wound: Chechnya 1994–2003. With Andre Glucksmann and Christian Caujolle. Trolley Books. 2004. ISBN 978-1904563013.
- Katrina: An Unnatural Disaster. With Thomas Dworzak, Kadir van Lohuizen, and Paolo Pellegrin. Ram Distribution. 2006. ISBN 978-9053305058.
- Chalk Lines: The Caucasus. Editions Intervalles. 2007. ISBN 978-2916355108.
- Black Passport. With Teun van der Heijden. Mets & Schilt. 2009. ISBN 978-1597111416.
