= Sebastián Liste =

Spanish photographer and sociologist

- Born: 1985 (age 40–41); Spain
- Occupations: Documentary photographer and sociologist

Sebastián Liste (born 1985) is a documentary photographer and sociologist whose work is focused in documenting the profound cultural changes and contemporary issues in Latin America and the Mediterranean area. He is a member of NOOR photo agency, a cooperative photojournalist agency located in the Netherlands.

== Biography ==
Liste was born in Spain. He specializes in long-term, in-depth projects where he create frameworks to make the societies reflect about the social consequences of today's decision makers.

In 2010, while he was getting his master's degree in Documentary Photography and Photojournalism at the Autonomous University of Barcelona, he won the Ian Parry Scholarship for his long term project "Urban Quilombo", about the extreme living conditions that dozens of families who have set up home in an abandoned chocolate factory in Salvador de Bahia, Brazil face. The same year he was named the young editorial photographer of the year at the Lucie Awards in New York.

Since then his work has appeared in The New York Times Magazine, Time magazine, The New Yorker, Paris Match, The Sunday Times Magazine, Burn, L'Espresso, D la Repubblica, Photo District News, the British Journal of Photography, Daylight Magazine and GUP Magazine, among other publications. In 2011 Liste was selected to participate in the 18th World Press Photo Joop Swart Masterclass in Amsterdam.

In 2012 Liste was announced as the Young Reporter of the Year winning the City of Perpignan Rémi Ochlik Award at Visa pour l'Image. The same year he won the Community Awareness Award at Pictures of the Year International competition, was named one of the 30 photographers to watch at PDN 30 and received a citation at the Olivier Rebbot Award. He also got the Emergentes DST Award at Encontros da Imagem Festival in Portugal and an honorable mention at Freelens Festival for Young Photojournalism in Germany. In addition he received a Magnum Emergency Fund Grant and the Getty Editorial Grant to develop his new project in the Brazilian Amazon.

In 2013, he received a Fotopres grant in Spain to develop a new project in Venezuela which resulted in his work "On the inside: Venezuelan prisons under inmate control". This project was exhibited at Visa pour l'Image in 2014 and at Caixa Forum in Madrid and Barcelona in 2015. That year he was also finalist at the Eugene Smith Grant and got the Emaho Award at Format International Photography Festival in the UK.

In 2014, he got the Alexia Foundation Grant in the U.S. to continue developing his ongoing project about crime, punishment and security in Latin America. In 2016 he was awarded third prize in the Daily Life category of World Press Photo for his story "Citizen Journalism in Brazil’s Favelas".

His work is held in the permanent collection of The Sorigue Foundation in Lerida, Spain, at Maison de l´Image Documentarie in Séte, France, and the Elton John Photography Collection,.

== Awards ==
- 2010 Ian Parry Scholarship for Urban Quilombo
- 2010 Lucie Awards, young editorial photographer of the year
- 2011 World Press Photo Joop Swart Masterclass, selected participant
- 2012 Getty Editorial Grant for the project on the Brazilian Amazon
- 2012 Magnum Emergency Found Grant for the project on the Brazilian Amazon
- 2012 Young Reporter of the Year, Rémi Ochlik Award at Visa pour l'Image festival
- 2012 Pictures of the Year International competition, Community Awareness Award
- 2012 PDN 30, 30 photographers to watch
- 2012 Olivier Rebbot Award, citation
- 2012 Encontros da Imagem Festival, Emergentes DST Award
- 2012 Freelens Festival for Young Photojournalism, honorable mention
- 2013 Fotopres Grant for the project on Venezuela prisons
- 2014 Eugene Smith Grant, W. Eugene Smith Memorial Fund, finalist
- 2014 Alexia Foundation Grant for the project about crime and security in Latin America
- 2014 Format International Photography Festival, Emaho Award
- 2016 World Press Photo, third prize Daily Life category
