= Boushra Almutawakel =

Yemeni photographer (born 1969)

- Born: 1969 (age 56–57); Sana'a, Yemen
- Education: American University
- Occupation: Photographer
- Organization(s): Al-Halaqa, Rawiya

Boushra Y. Almutawakel (Arabic: بشرى المتوكل; born 1969) is a Yemeni photographer. Her work concerns the international perception of Arabs and Muslims and focuses in particular on the international perception of issues of gender and representations of Muslim/Arab women and their clothing.

== Early and personal life ==
Almutawakel was born in 1969 in Sana'a, Yemen. After studying at American University in Washington, D.C., she returned to Yemen in 1994, where she became one of the country's first female professional photographers.

She moved from Sana’a to France in August 2013 with her husband and their four daughters.

== Work and career ==
In 1996, she became a founder member of Al-Halaqa, an organisation that provided a space for art to be displayed and discussed.

In 1999, aside from developing her photographic work and being an educational adviser, Boushra Almutawakel was honoured as the first Yemeni female photographer by the Empirical Research and Women's Studies Centre at Sana'a University.

Almutawakel was living in the United States at the time of the September 11 attacks, which led her to focus on perceptions, both positive and negative, of Arabs and Muslims. She engaged specifically with the Egyptian writer Nawal El Saadawi's remark that "women who wore the hijab or niqab were the same as women who wore makeup in the sense that they all hid their true identities", and sought to interpret Saadawi's ideas through photography. Her "Mother, Daughter, Doll" (2010) series portrays a progression from Western clothing to the hijab and explores perceptions of women in particular. It includes photographs of "Fulla" dolls, a toy similar to Barbie dolls marketed to Muslim children. Almutawakel's work also examines the ways Yemeni women have covered their bodies historically and in the present. Discussing her focus on clothing and the niqab, Almutawakel has said "I want to be careful not to fuel the stereotypical, widespread negative images most commonly portrayed about the hijab/veil in the Western media. Especially the notion that most, or all women who wear the hijab/veil, are weak, oppressed, ignorant, and backwards". Another project depicts women dressed in men's traditional clothing; Almutawakel explains "men's traditional clothing is very similar to women's clothing—long, loose, modest and often with a head-covering. The focus in Western media is always on the way women are dressed so I wanted to challenge this idea."

As of 2014, Almutawakel was a member of Rawiya. In 2018, she was listed as one of BBC's 100 Women.

She has worked as a photographer for the British Council, CARE, the Royal Netherlands Embassy, the French Cultural Centre, and the United Nations; and also worked for the Yemeni embassy in Washington, D.C. as a consultant on cultural affairs and for the Yemeni Ministry of Human Rights, focusing on women's issues.

== See also ==
- Women in Yemen
