= Francesco Zizola =

Italian photojournalist (born 1962)

Francesco Zizola (born 1962) is an Italian photojournalist, based in Rome. His photographs have appeared in magazines and he has received numerous World Press Photo awards, including World Press Photo of the Year in 1996 and four Pictures of the Year International awards. He is a member of NOOR photo agency, which he co-founded.

== Life and work ==
Zizola was born in Rome and studied anthropology. He began working as a professional photographer in 1981 and became a photojournalist in 1986. He is based in Rome.

He is a member of NOOR photo agency, which he co-founded in 2007.

== Publications ==
- Ruas. Abele, 1994. ISBN 978-8876702006.
- Etats d'Eenfances. Photo Poche, 1999. ISBN 9782097542717.
- Born Somewhere. Delpire Editeurs; Fusi Orari, 2004. ISBN 978-8887028355.
- Iraq. Abele; Amnesty International, 2007. With a foreword by Pietro Veronese.
- True Colours. NOOR 5. NOOR, 2012.

== Documentary films about Zizola ==
- Occhio Sensibile = Sensitive Eye (2006) – by Liliana Ginanneschi

== Awards ==
- 1994: MIFAV prize, Best photographic book, Italy
- 1995: First prize, People in the News Stories, World Press Photo, Amsterdam
- 1996: Visa d’Or, France
- 1997: First prize, People Stories, World Press Photo, Amsterdam
- 1997: World Press Photo of the Year, World Press Photo, Amsterdam
- 1997: Pictures of the Year International, USA
- 1998: Second prize, General News Stories, World Press Photo, Amsterdam
- 1998: First prize, General News, World Press Photo, Amsterdam
- 1998: Pictures of the Year International, USA
- 2000: Second prize, Eugene Smith contest, USA
- 2002: Second prize, Daily Life Stories, World Press Photo, Amsterdam
- 2003: Pictures of the Year International, USA
- 2004: Special Recognition Award, Alexia Foundation for World Peace, USA
- 2005: First prize, Portraits Singles, World Press Photo, Amsterdam
- 2005: Second Prize, National Press Photographers Association Best of Photojournalism, USA
- 2005: "Born Somewhere", Photo District News Best Book Selection
- 2006: Third place, Magazine Division / Portrait, Pictures of the Year International, USA
- 2006: Hansel Mieth Prize 2005, Germany
- 2006: Photo District News Annual Web Winner
- 2006: Golden Doves for Peace, IRIAD.
- 2007: Special Jury Prize (with seven others), Days Japan International Photojournalism Awards.
- 2008: Second prize, People in the News, Stories, World Press Photo, Amsterdam
- 2012: Third prize, Nature, Singles, World Press Photo, Amsterdam
- 2016: Second prize, Contemporary Issues, Stories, World Press Photo, Amsterdam
