= Laureana Toledo =

Mexican painter

- Born: 1970 (age 54–55); Ixtepec, Oaxaca, Mexico
- Website: Laureana Toledo on Twitter

Laureana Toledo (born 1970) is a Mexican conceptual artist. She has had solo exhibitions at Museo Universitario Arte Contemporáneo and at Museo Jumex in Mexico City. A work of Toledo's outdoor sculpture is included in the permanent collections of the Museo de Arte Moderno in Mexico City, and the Brooklyn Museum in New York.

== Early life ==
Toledo was born in Ixtepec, Oaxaca, Mexico in 1970. She is the daughter of Mexican artist Francisco Toledo. Her siblings include artist Dr. Lakra and poet Natalia Toledo.

== Career ==
Toledo began as a photographer, and later incorporated drawing, painting, video, sound and sculpture into her work. From January to March 2009, she was an artist in residence at Gasworks, a contemporary art organisation in South London, UK. She has been on the artists council of and is a co-founder of SOMA, an educational art space in Mexico City which hosts international artists, curators, critics, and art historians in residential programs.

According to a SOMA Summer artist-in-residence description,

Laureana is inspired by the imperceptible or transient moments of the everyday, speculating on how such phenomena can gain new forms of visual presentation. Her work often involves systematic and repetitive interventions into different media (texts, books, photographs, paintings, etc.) to re-code their existing narratives.

In 2015, Toledo's work, Order and Progress, presented at the Museo Universitario Arte Contemporáneo in Mexico City, investigated the links between Mexico and Great Britain. In 2019, Toledo exhibited an installation at Museo Jumex in Mexico City. She selected books, records and films from Mick Jones (of the Clash)'s private collection.

== Personal life ==
Toledo lives and works in Mexico City.

== Publications ==
- Laureana Toledo peripheral vision, 1997–2000. Guadalajara, México: Museo de las Artes, 2001. In English and Spanish.
- Paan. Mexico: Diamantina Conaculta, 2006. ISBN 978-9703510849. Exhibition catalogue. In Spanish.
- The Limit. London: Trolley, 2009. ISBN 978-1-904563-96-9.
- The waste land. Mexico. 2023

== Awards and honors ==
- A mid-career award from the Cisneros Fontanls Art Foundation
- 2004: International Studio & Curatorial Program (ISCP) residency, New York City
- 2009: Gasworks residency, London

== Exhibitions ==
=== Solo exhibitions or exhibitions with one other ===
- Laureana Toledo/Sam Samore, Galería OMR, Mexico City, 2005
- Order and Progress, Museo Universitario Arte Contemporáneo, Mexico City, 2015
- ...but it often rhymes, Museo Jumex, Mexico City, January–March 2019

=== Group exhibitions ===
- Strategic Questions, Kunstlerhaus Bethanien, Berlin, 2005
- Declaraciones 2, Museo Nacional Centro de Arte Reina Sofía, Madrid, 2005
- Nombres propios, Caja Negra gallery at ARCOmadrid art fair, Madrid, 2008
- Abstract Cabinet, in collaboration with John Taylor (of Duran Duran), Eastside Projects, Birmingham, UK, September–November 2009. Included their Correspondencia.
- Yes, Trolley Gallery, London, March–April 2010

== Collections ==
Toledo's work is held in the following permanent collections:

- Jardín Escultórico of the Museo de Arte Moderno, Mexico City – a work of outdoor sculpture
- Brooklyn Museum, New York – a work of outdoor sculpture

== Bibliography ==
- Espacio de experimentación sonora + arte en vivo, 2015 : sound experimentation space + live art, 2015. Ciudad de México: MUAC, Museo Universitario Arte Contemporáneo, Universidad Nacional Autónoma de México, 2016.
