= Tasneem Alsultan =

Saudi-American photographer

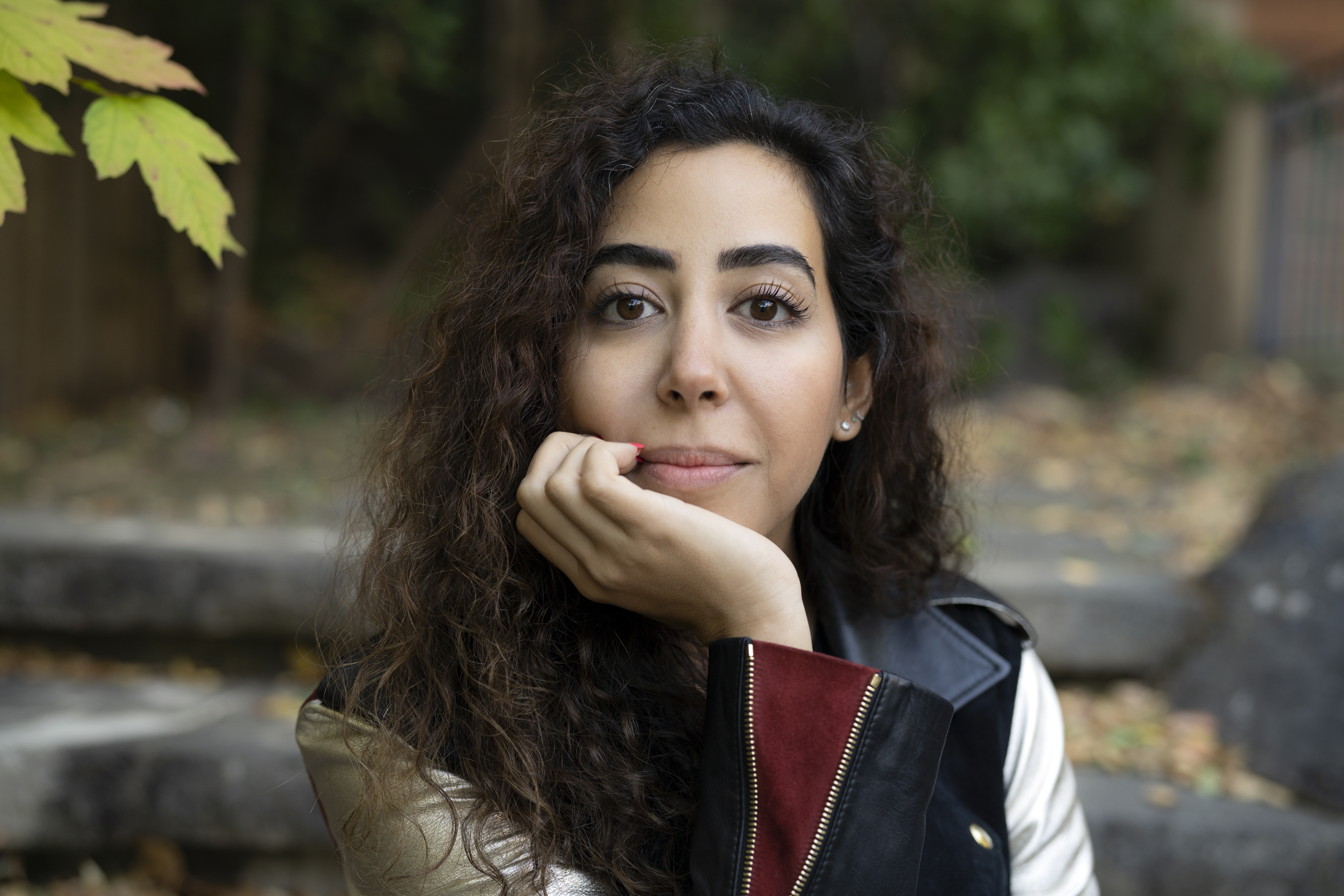
- Alsultan in 2019
- Born: October 10, 1985 (age 40); Tucson, Arizona, U.S.
- Education: King Abdulaziz University (BA); Portland State University (MA)
- Occupation: Photographer
- Website: tasneemalsultan.com

Tasneem Alsultan (born October 10, 1985) is a Saudi-American photographer, artist and speaker. Having covered stories primarily for The New York Times and National Geographic, she is known for her work on gender and social issues in Saudi Arabia and the region. Among other distinctions, Alsultan has been named Ambassador for the Canon imaging corporation as the first Arab woman photographer.

== Early life and education ==
Alsultan was born in Tucson, Arizona, but moved to the U.K. with her family at age five and completed the majority of early schooling there. She became a hobby photographer starting at age nine.

She moved to Saudi Arabia at the age of 16, earning her undergraduate degree in English literature and linguistics at King Abdul Aziz University in Jeddah. She also holds a master's degree in social linguistics and anthropology from Portland State University.

== Photography career ==
Alsultan returned to Saudi Arabia in 2008 and began taking photos while trying to find a job. Her photography gained her a following on Facebook. She opened her first photography studio while teaching at a college in Bahrain. She later taught as a lecturer in Dubai, where she decided to quit her job to pursue photography full-time. Alsultan is a member of Rawiya, the first all-female photography collective from the Middle East.

Alsultan's photography tends to focus on "mundane yet important" moments, particularly those moments related to women's life and empowerment in Saudi Arabia, such as women driving and visiting cinemas for the first time. She photographed Jeddah's first music concert, headed by Algerian musician Khaled and American rapper Nelly.

In 2020, she cofounded Ruwa Space, a platform to support visual creatives and offer education and consultation across the Middle East and North Africa. In 2021, Alsultan coproduced and co hosted Repicture podcast and photographed AlSunbula Company and MDLBeast Sound Storm in Riyadh.

In 2022, Alsultan was a judge for World Press Photo and for Catchlight Fellowship. She participated in L'Oreal's 2022 campaign the Lesson of Worth. She was also a speaker at both Elevate Wedding Photography Conference in London, United Kingdom, and the Way Up North Photography Conference in Vienna, Austria.

Alsultan has participated in several projects in Saudi Arabia. She was an Instructor at the Lens for Equality Project funded/sponsored by Goethe Institute & French Consulate in Riyadh, a presenter and mentor in Misk 2022, and a creative Consultant at the Tanween Conference 2022 at Ithraa in Dhahran. That same year, Alsultan presented at Arles Live magazine in Paris, and was the Co-host and Organizer at the Diriyah Biennale of Photographers Conference.

She has cited Maggie Steber as a photography idol of hers.

=== Saudi Tales of Love ===
One of Alsultan's most popular projects, "Saudi Tales of Love," explores the realities of marriage, divorce, and widowhood in Saudi Arabia through the eyes of Saudi women. The project was partly influenced by her own personal experience with arranged marriage at the age of 17, which eventually ended in divorce.

Selected as one of the 10 grantees of the Arab Documentary Photography Program, funded by Magnum Foundation and the Prince Claus Prize as an AFAC grantee in 2015, she began working on her project "Saudi Tales of Love". This project was published in Time's Lightbox, and later exhibited in Paris Photo, PhotoKathmandu, and among the slideshow at Visa Pour L'Image, Perpignan, in 2016.

=== Photography business ===
Alsultan has a personal photography business where she photographs Saudi weddings. In 2016, her wedding photography was profiled by National Geographic, where she stated that she has photographed more than 200 weddings in 21 countries. She has recently extended her social documentary photography to Kuwait, where she is currently working on a project that focuses on capturing the unique challenges facing LGBTQ individuals in the country.

== Awards and recognition ==
In April 2016, Alsultan was selected by the British Journal of Photography as one of the 16 emerging photographers to watch in 2016, and was later selected by PDN as one of the 30 photographers to watch in 2017. She was a finalist in the 2017 Sony World Photography Awards in Contemporary Issues.

In 2018 she joined the Canon Ambassador program as the program's first Arab female photographer and was selected as one of the 12 recipients of the Joop Master Class, part of the World Press Photo, Netherlands.

In 2019, Alsultan was selected as a recipients of the Catchlight Fellowship to continue her work on Saudi women. She has also received honorable mention for the Anja Niedringhaus Courage in Photojournalism. That year she was also voted the 'Princess Noura University Award for Excellence' in the Arts category.

== Personal life ==
Alsultan married at age 17; she later divorced her husband. She has two daughters, born in the late 2000s.

== Exhibitions ==
2019

- "And Then There Were Women" at the King Abdul Aziz center ITHRA
- Exhibited at Hafez Gallery Jeddah, Images of Jeddah, sponsored by the French Consulate

2018

- Solo exhibition; Saudi Tales of Love; East Wing Gallery, Dubai UAE
- Group exhibition: Through Her Eyes Photo Festival, Berlin, Germany

2017

- "Saudi Tales of Love wins first prize in Contemporary Issues 'Professional' at the Sony World Photography Awards and exhibited in Somerset House, London, UK
- Photographing the Female, Focus Photo Festival, Sun Mill Studios Compound Lower Parel, Mumbai, India
- 'Saudi Tales of Love' Gulf Photo Plus, UAE
- Rawiya Photo Collective: 'We Do Not Choose Our Dictators', Fort Worth Contemporary Arts, Texas, US
- Middle East now, Florence, Italy
- Rawiya Photo Collective: 'We Do Not Choose Our Dictators', Aperture, New York, US
- La Quatrieme Image, Paris, France

2016

- 'Saudi Tales of Love' Photo Kathmandu Festival 2016, Nepal
- Where Are We Now?, East Wing presentation at Paris Photo 2016
- Tbilisi Photo Festival, Georgia
- Slideshow at Visa Pour L'Image
