= Nina Berman =

American documentary photographer

- Born: 1960 (age 65–66); New York City, U.S.
- Education: University of Chicago (AB); Columbia University (MS)
- Occupation: Documentary photographer
- Website: www.ninaberman.com

Nina Berman (born 1960) is an American documentary photographer, filmmaker, author and educator. Her wide-ranging work looks at American politics, militarism, environmental contamination and post violence trauma. Berman is the author of three monographs: Purple Hearts – Back From Iraq; Homeland; and An autobiography of Miss Wish.

Her photographs and videos have been exhibited in the Brooklyn Museum, Dublin Contemporary 2011 and the 2010 Whitney Museum of American Art Biennial. She is the recipient of a New York Foundation for the Arts grant, several photojournalism awards, including two World Press Photo awards and a Hasselblad award.

== Early life and education ==
Berman was born in New York City. She received an A.B. from the University of Chicago and a M.S. from the Columbia University Graduate School of Journalism.

== Work ==
She is a member of the NOOR photo agency and an associate professor at Columbia University. She is a former teacher at the International Center of Photography in New York City.

In 2005, Berman received the first Open Society Institute documentary distribution grant and traveled to high schools around the USA with Army veteran Robert Acosta presenting and exhibiting the Purple Hearts project. Her work with high school students continued in 2010 in collaboration with the Whitney Museum of American Art as an artist in residence with the museum's Youth Insights program. In 2011, Berman developed a high school art curriculum with the Whitney Museum of American Art based on her images of wounded American veterans from the Iraq War and her Homeland series. In 2009, Berman became a member of the NOOR photo agency based in Amsterdam. In 2012, she became an associate professor at the Columbia University Graduate School of Journalism.

== Publications ==
=== Monographs ===
- Purple Hearts – Back from Iraq. London: Trolley, 2004.
- Homeland. London: Trolley, 2008.
- An autobiography of Miss Wish. Heidelberg, Germany: Kehrer, 2017.

=== Catalogues/books ===
- Crimes of War: What the Public Should Know, Roy Gutman, David Rieff, Norton, 1999.
- Humans Being: Disability in Contemporary Art, Chicago Cultural Center, Chicago, 2006.
- War Stories, Massachusetts College of Art and Design, Boston, 2008.
- The Pursuit of Happiness, Stitching Fotografie, Noorderlicht, 2009.
- A History of Women Photographers, Naomi Rosenblum, Abbeville Press Publishers, New York, 2010.
- A New American Photographic Dream: US Today After, Gilles Verneret, Silvana Editoriale, Milan, 2010.
- Whitney Biennial 2010, Whitney Museum of American Art, New York, 2010.
- Disquieting Images, Germano Celant /Melissa Harris, Skira, Milan, 2011.
- Ugliness: A Reconsideration, I.B. Tauris, London, 2012.
- Photographs Not Taken, Will Steacy, Daylight Books, 2012.
- Making History, RAY Fotografieprojekte, Frankfurt, 2012.
- Bosnia – 1992–1995, Jon Jones and Gary Knight, Sarajevo, 2012.
- War/Photography: Images of Armed Conflict and its Aftermath, Anne Wilkes Tucker, MFAH, USA, 2012.
- Photojournalists on War: The Untold Stories from Iraq, Mike Kamber, University of Texas, 2013.
- Trolleyology, Gigi Giannuzzi/Hannah Watson, Trolley, London, 2013.

== Awards ==
- 1993: Pictures of the Year Award
- 1997: Pictures of the Year Award
- 1998: Pictures of the Year Award
- 1999: Pictures of the Year Award
- 2004: Third Prize (with two others) (along with four others), Days Japan International Photojournalism Awards.
- 2005: Open Society Institute Documentary Grant
- 2005: World Press Photo award
- 2006: New York Foundation for the Arts Fellowship
- 2007: Pictures of the Year Award
- 2007: World Press Photo award (for her portrait "Marine Wedding" of Tyler Ziegel, a wounded Marine, and his bride)
- 2009: PDN Annual Book Award
- 2009: Hasselblad Masters Award
- 2014: The Josephine Herrick Project Annual Photographer Award
- 2016: The Aftermath Project Grant Award
- 2017: Susan E. Tifft fellow, Center for Documentary Studies, Duke University
