= Ziegel =

Ziegel (lit. "brick") is a German language surname. Notable people with the name include:

- Erich Ziegel (1876–1950), German theatre director and actor
- Felix Ziegel (1920–1988), Soviet researcher
- Tyler Ziegel (1982–2012), United States Marine Corps sergeant
- Vic Ziegel (1937–2010), American sports writer, columnist, and editor
