= Hasan Ibrahim Belal =

Syrian photographer, born 1993

- Born: 1993 (age 32–33); Tartus, Syria
- Education: University of Economics (Syria)
- Occupation: Photographer
- Years active: 2011–present
- Known for: Documentary photography, photojournalism
- Website: www.hasanbelal.com

Hasan Ibrahim Belal, also known as Hasan Belal, (Arabic: حسن إبراهيم بلال; born 1993) is a Syrian documentary photographer and photojournalist whose work represents everyday life in Syria during and after the Syrian civil war. He is noted for using photography as a form of visual storytelling, focusing on the social dimensions of conflict and reconstruction in his country.

== Early life and education ==
Belal was born in 1993 in Tartus, a coastal city in western Syria. At age 15, he started to take photographs of his family and started photography as a hobby. He studied economics at a Syrian university before turning to freelance photography in the early 2010s. Initially self-taught, he began documenting daily life in his surroundings, later receiving professional training through a programme organised by the Thomson Reuters Foundation with Dar al-Musawer in Beirut.

== Career ==
During the Syrian Civil War from 2011 to 2024, Belal’s photographic work centred on the experiences of Syrians living amid protracted conflict. He moved to Damascus in 2017, where he has since worked as a freelance photographer for humanitarian and news organisations including UNICEF, the International Committee of the Red Cross, Caritas, and the Norwegian Refugee Council. His approach is grounded in visual anthropology, treating photography as a tool for observing and interpreting social realities. His projects have explored topics such as public transport in Damascus, gender roles and women’s rights, youth culture, and displacement. Through these subjects, he aims to document the persistence of daily life despite instability and restriction.

Operating within Syria’s controlled media environment, Belal has described photographing in public spaces as a challenge, requiring caution and discretion. He has noted the scarcity of institutions supporting visual education or independent documentary work in the country. In 2023 he contributed to visual reporting on the aftermath of the Turkey–Syria earthquake for humanitarian organisations.

In a 2025 interview, Belal recounted the constant fear and surveillance that accompanied his street photography in Syria. He describes how journalists were closely monitored by state security and even by ordinary citizens, forcing him to disguise his work or act casually to avoid suspicion. Despite these risks, he continued photographing everyday life discreetly. In 2024, his situation worsened when he was detained by Syrian intelligence after documenting funerals for Iranian figures killed in Israeli airstrikes on Damascus. Held for eight days in the Palestine Branch prison, he later reflected that the experience profoundly reshaped his understanding of freedom.

== Style and themes ==
Belal’s work is characterised by observational realism and restrained composition. He favours ordinary urban scenes over overt images of violence, emphasising human adaptation and continuity. His photography often conveys the psychological effects of war through gestures, waiting, and silence rather than direct confrontation.

In a 2022 photo-essay, Belal documented the underground electronic-music scene in Syria through the platform Underground House Syria (UGH), which started in 2017 in Tartus and moved into Damascus in 2018. Despite living in a war-torn country where leisure culture seems detached from daily survival, the author shows how young Syrians persist in seeking freedom, socialising and creating a space for music and community. The UGH collective provided a rare social outlet amid war-related hardship, organising events and collaborating regionally (Lebanon, Jordan) and giving Syrian artists access to expression. In capturing these moments, Belal sayid he feels both “freedom” and “responsibility” — using his camera to document a side of Syrian life that resists reductive war imagery and shows people reclaiming joy and identity.

In 2023, Belal published a photo-essay on women's lives and their rights in Syria. Commenting on these images, he highlighted how Syrian women are subject to many kinds of pressures: from social norms, religious frameworks, economic hardship, and the war’s upheaval. He noted that many women had to scale back their working lives, give up certain rights, and prioritise their children’s welfare above their own ambitions. He further pointed out that since the conflict that began in 2011, women in Syria — especially in front-line or displaced settings — have faced increased risks: sexual assault, displacement, detention, domestic violence, child marriage, reduced access to schooling and healthcare.

After the 2023 Turkey–Syria earthquake and commissioned by a Swiss Christian NGO, Belal travelled to Aleppo to capture the aftermath of the earthquake through photos, videos and interviews. His work depicts Franciscan monasteries and schools full of people in need of help, and reveals the personal stories of the children and adults who sought shelter there. It provides an insight into everyday life in the aftermath of the disaster.

After the civil war, Belal has commercially published his photographs and videos online at Getty Images. Among other scenes, these include videos, sometimes taken with the help of an aerial drone, of the traditional Feast of the Cross celebration in the Syrian Christian town of Maaloula, Muslims in the Umayyad Mosque in Damascus performing Eid al-Adha prayers and former prisoners in Sednaya prison celebrating freedom and calling for justice.

Apart from his documentary photography of public life, Belal published two series of pictures showing nude bodies in 2022.

== Exhibitions ==
- Looking For Truth, Dar Al-Nimr, Beirut, July 2018
- Beirut Image Festival, Open Door, Beirut, November 2019
- Connexion Festival Building Bridges, Rome, Italy, December 2019
- Vantage Point Sharjah 8, Sharjah Art Foundation , UAE, August 2020
- Chemistry Of Feeling, Gulf Photo Plus, UAE, July 2021
- I Feel Longing, Sierre, Switzerland, December 2022
- I Feel Longing, Dar al Mussawir, Beirut, 2023
- Moments Of Being, Matossian Gallery, Haigazian University, Beirut, Lebanon, September 2023

== Reception ==
Belal belongs to a generation of Syrian photographers who document the country’s transformation from within rather than from exile. His integration of ethnographic perspective with documentary photography has been recognised as contributing to broader understandings of post-war Syrian society. Belal has worked for the Turkish Anadolu Agency, and his images have been published by The Washington Post, the UK-based news organization Middle East Eye, and the French La Croix newspaper, among others. His photo-essays have appeared in international publications including US-based Lens Magazine, Dutch NOOR photo agency, and Swiss Fairpicture non-governmental organization and have been presented in exhibitions in the Middle East and Europe.

In December 2022, Belal was invited to an artistic residence programme resulting in a solo exhibition in Sierre, Switzerland, where he documented scenes from the lives of immigrants from Ukraine, Syria and Afghanistan.
