= Graphic Arts Institute of Oaxaca =

Art school in Oaxaca, Mexico

- Instituto de Artes Gráficas de Oaxaca
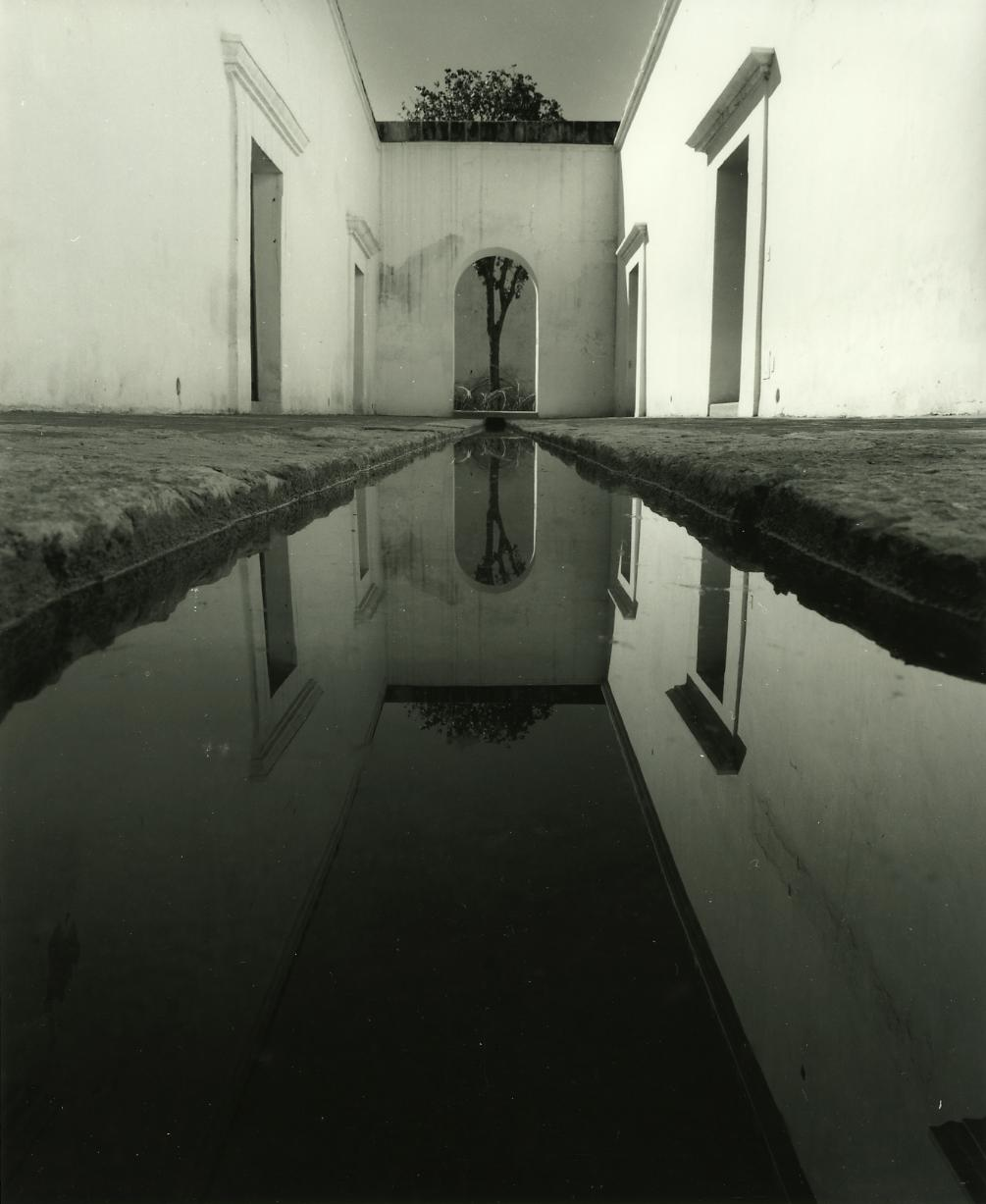
- Established: 1988
- Location: Oaxaca de Juarez, Oaxaca, Mexico
- Type: Art
- Director: Patricia Mendoza
- Website: Institute website

The Graphic Arts Institute of Oaxaca (Spanish: Instituto de Artes Gráficas de Oaxaca) is a school of art located in the city of Oaxaca de Juarez, Oaxaca, Mexico. The institute was founded by artist Francisco Toledo and hosts a large collection of artwork from Latin America.

== Cultural center ==
The Institute also serves as a cultural center that includes:

- The Library of Institute of Graphic Arts of Oaxaca specializing in art, which houses about 60,000 volumes mainly donated by Francisco Toledo
- The Centro Fotográfico Manuel Álvarez Bravo, named after the Mexican photographer Manuel Álvarez Bravo (1902–2002)
- The Eduardo Mata Music Library
