= NOOR photo agency =

Documentary photography collective and foundation

NOOR
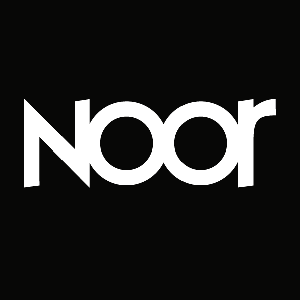
- Type: Cooperative
- Industry: Photography
- Founded: 2007
- Headquarters: Amsterdam
- Area served: Worldwide
- Products: Photojournalism, photo agency, foundation
- Website: noorimages.com

NOOR is an international photo agency and foundation owned and directed by the member photographers under a cooperative model. It is headquartered in Amsterdam, Netherlands, with photographers based worldwide.

The agency is known for producing independent visual reports that stimulate positive social change, and impact views on human rights and other issues of global concern.

== History ==
NOOR Images was launched in 2007 at Visa pour l’Image festival by the former managing director Claudia Hinterseer and member photographers Pep Bonet, Stanley Greene, Yuri Kozyrev, Kadir van Lohuizen, Francesco Zizola and former members Jan Grarup, Samantha Appleton, Philip Blenkinsop and Jodi Bieber.

The agency later received new members: Jon Lowenstein in 2008, Nina Berman in 2009, Alixandra Fazzina in 2010, and Andrea Bruce in 2011, Bénédicte Kurzen in 2013, Sebastián Liste and Asim Rafiqui in 2014, and Tanya Habjouqa and Robin Hammond in 2016.

As of August 2015, Clément Saccomani is the new managing director of the agency.

In March 2009, the NOOR Foundation launched its first masterclass in documentary photography in Lagos, inviting 15 African photojournalists from seven countries. Since then, the NOOR Foundation has organized workshops, masterclasses, seminars, lectures and other educational activities, in St Petersburg (2010), Bucharest (2011) Cairo (2011), Cape Town (2012), Tunis (2013), Bayeux (2013, 2015), Istanbul (2014), Belgrade (2015) and Amsterdam (2015).

NOOR works in close collaboration with educational organizations and professional photographers, all experienced teachers and lecturers in documentary photography.

== Photographers ==
Name	Nationality	Member since
Stanley Greene	USA	2007
Kadir van Lohuizen	NED	2007
Pep Bonet	Majorca	2007
Yuri Kozyrev	RUS	2007
Francesco Zizola	Italy	2007
Jon Lowenstein	USA	2008
Nina Berman	USA	2009
Alixandra Fazzina	UK	2010
Andrea Bruce	USA	2011
Bénédicte Kurzen	France	2013
Sebastián Liste	Spain	2014
Tanya Habjouqa	USAJordan	2016
Sanne De Wilde	Belgium	2017
Olga Kravets	Russia	2020
Heba Khamis	Egypt	2020

== Climate Change by NOOR ==
Climate Change by NOOR is a long-term group project that focuses on two issues. The first, ‘Consequences by NOOR’ is an eyewitness record of the devastating effects of climate change around the globe. Produced in the autumn of 2009, these visual reportages show not ‘what might happen’ in the future but what is happening right now, emphasizing the urgency of addressing the issues at stake.

NOOR continued the project in autumn 2010, with 'Solutions' a visual project investigating what is and what can be done to slow down or reverse climate change. This focuses on human stories about alternative power sources, renewable energies, and attempts to alleviate, adjust or cope with the rise of global temperatures, the biggest challenge our world has ever faced.

== Urban Survivors by NOOR ==
In 2011, NOOR partnered with Doctors Without Borders to raise an awareness campaign on the living conditions in the urban settlements around the world. The project has been executed in Bangladesh, Guatemala, Haiti, Kenya, Pakistan, Honduras and South Africa by seven NOOR photographers with the aim of casting a light on the challenges that overpopulation is setting up for the future.

The project resulted in the Urban Survivors web documentary made by Darjeeling Productions featuring photo-films – the website was nominated for the 2012 Webby Awards – and a travelling photo exhibition.

== The New Brazil by NOOR ==
The New Brazil is a group project by NOOR photographers focusing on the fast development that Brazil is experiencing in recent years. Through a multifaceted approach, NOOR photographers put a spotlight on this growing and complex modern society, creating an eyewitness record of the many faces of the world’s fifth largest country, both geographically and in population count, and the seventh – and fastest growing – economic power on the planet.

The New Brazil has been produced by NOOR photographers in 2012 and consists of 8 different features.

== Za'atari by NOOR ==
The Syrian war has created an unprecedented refugee crisis with millions of Syrians displaced. Nearly 100,000 refugees live on a stretch of land in northern Jordan at the Za’atari camp, now the second largest refugee camp in the world. Located 12 kilometers from the Syrian border, the camp opened with just 100 families in July 2012.

In December 2013 – January 2014, four NOOR photographers documented life at Za’atari. Around 100 of these photographs were then printed larger than life and pasted on 120 meters of the camp’s security walls as a way to humanize the architecture and give visitors and stakeholders an immediate impression of the people and life inside.

The Za’atari project was a collaboration between UNHCR, JEN, and produced by Nina Berman.

== See also ==
- Deca (journalism collective)
