= Laura Boushnak =

Kuwaiti-born Palestinian photographer

- لورا بشناق
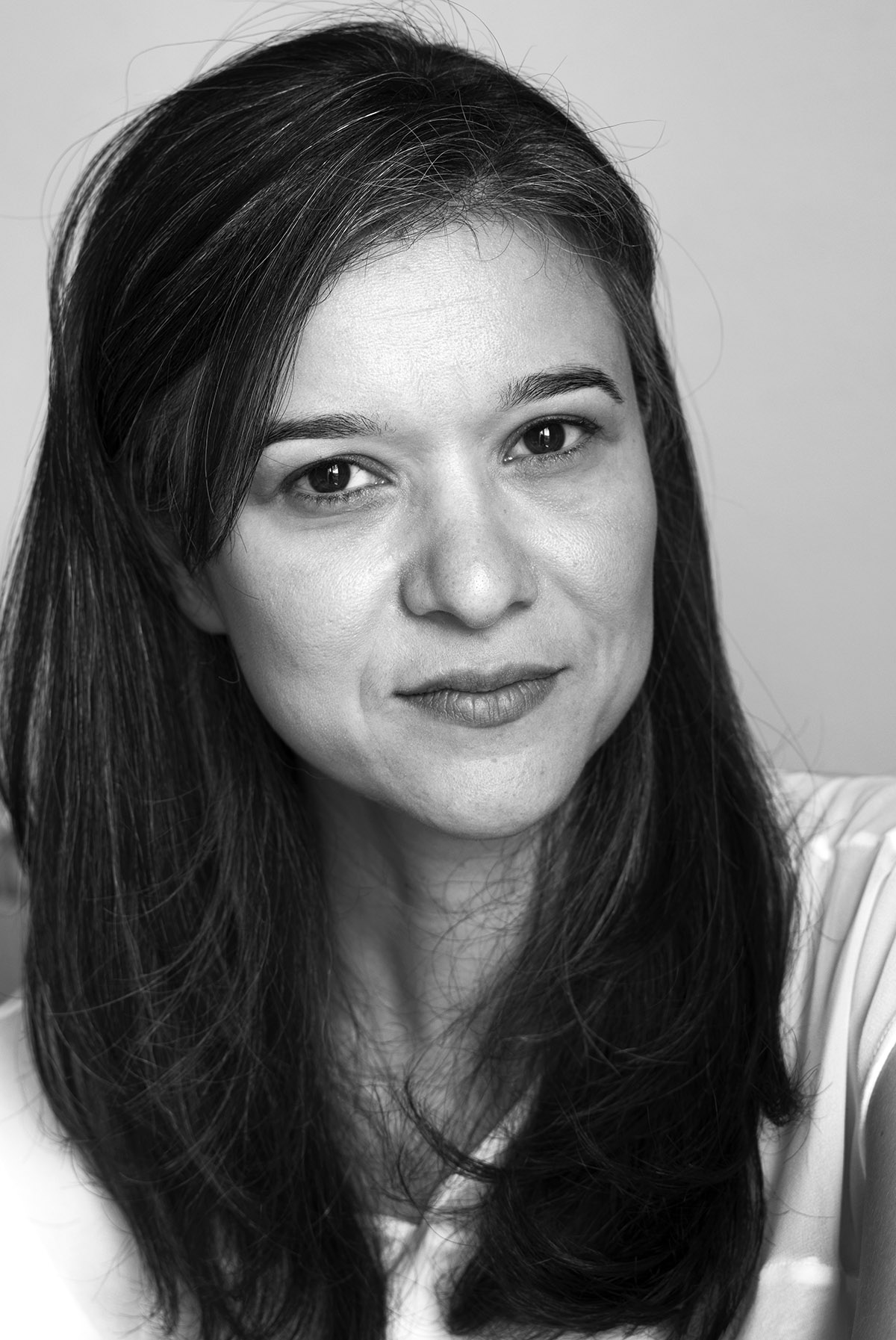
- Laura Boushnak 2014
- Born: 1976 (age 49–50); Kuwait
- Education: Lebanese University
- Occupations: Photographer, artist

Laura Boushnak (Arabic: لورا بشناق; born 1976) is a Kuwaiti-born Palestinian photographer whose work is focused on women, literacy, and education reform in the Arab world. For her ongoing documentary project "I Read I Write" she photographed girls and women changing their lives with education in Egypt, Yemen, Kuwait, Jordan and Tunisia.

== Early life ==
Boushnak was born in Kuwait in 1976 to third-generation Palestinian refugee parents. She attended public school there until Palestinian children were not allowed to attend public schools in retaliation for the Palestine Liberation Organization's (PLO) support for Iraq's 1991 Invasion of Kuwait. She then transferred to Fajer al-Sabah School, a private Catholic school.

== Career ==
After completing a BA in sociology at the Lebanese University in Beirut in 1997, Boushnak began her photography career covering news for the Associated Press agency in Lebanon. She later worked as a photo editor and photographer for the French news agency Agence France-Presse (AFP) at its Middle East hub in Cyprus and its headquarters in Paris. Her nine-year wire experience included covering hard news in conflicts such as the war in Iraq and the 2006 Israel-Hezbollah war. Her photographs have been published by many international newspapers and magazines, such as: The New York Times, The Guardian, The Washington Post, and Le Monde.

After covering the 2006 Israeli/Hezbollah war for AFP, she witnessed how many people, including her own family and close relatives, had to flee their homes and seek refuge. When the war was over, Boushnak started the project "Survivor" a story of Mohammed, who was trying to embrace his new life after losing both legs in a cluster bomb incident.

Since 2008 Boushnak has been working as an independent photographer, devoting more time to her long-term projects, one of which is a broad, ongoing one, titled "I Read I Write". The project shows successful and independent women from the Arab region who changed their lives through education while exposing and questioning the barriers they face. These women are seen as a source of inspiration in their own communities and beyond. With this project Boushnak wanted to expand her means of expression by applying a more artistic approach, rather than presenting a socio-political documentation. She engaged the women by getting them to write on the photograph itself.

Her work "I Read I Write: Egypt- Illiteracy series" was acquired by the British Museum in 2012, and by private collectors. It has been exhibited at institutions such as: Arp Museum Bahnhof Rolandseck, Birmingham Museum and Art Gallery, MODEM Museum, Sharjah Art Museum and the Contemporary Art Platform, Kuwait. Getty Images awarded Boushnak a special grant for editorial photography in 2014 to continue her "I Read I Write" project.

In 2014 Boushnak became a TED Global Fellow and gave a TED talk about her education project, which went online on TED main website Recently, Boushnak gave another TED talk about the human impact of cluster submunition .

Boushnak co-founded Rawiya collective, the first all female photo collective in the Middle East.
