= Philip Jones Griffiths =

Welsh photojournalist

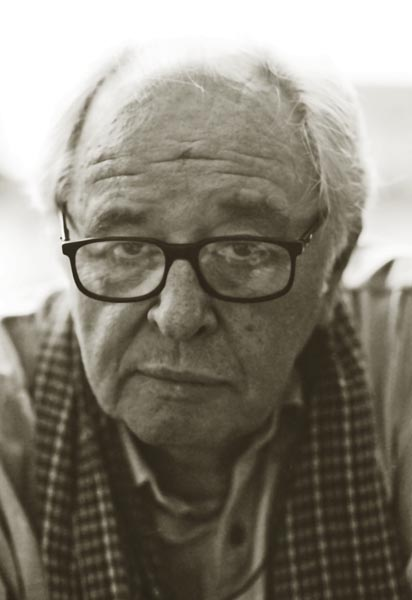
- Born: 18 February 1936; Rhuddlan, Denbighshire, Wales
- Died: 19 March 2008 (aged 72); London, England
- Occupation: Photojournalism
- Website: www.philipjonesgriffiths.org

Philip Jones Griffiths (18 February 1936 – 19 March 2008) was a Welsh photojournalist known for his coverage of the Vietnam War.

== Biography ==
Jones Griffiths was born in Rhuddlan in Denbighshire, North Wales, to Joseph Griffiths, who supervised the local trucking service of the London, Midland and Scottish Railway, and Catherine Jones, Rhuddlan's district nurse, who ran a small maternity clinic at home. The couple had three sons, of whom Philip was the eldest.

On leaving St Asaph's Grammar School at age 18, Philip, a pacifist and member of the Peace Pledge Union, was registered by the North Western Tribunal as a conscientious objector, obviating conscription to military service.

He studied pharmacy in Liverpool and worked in London as the night manager at the Piccadilly branch of Boots, while also working as a part-time photographer for the Manchester Guardian.

His first photograph was of a friend, taken with the family Brownie in a rowing boat off Holyhead.

Jones Griffiths never married, saying it was a bourgeois notion, but that he had had "significant" relationships. Survived by Fanella Ferrato and Katherine Holden, his daughters from long-term relationships with Donna Ferrato and Heather Holden, he died from cancer on 19 March 2008.

Journalist John Pilger wrote in tribute to Griffiths soon after his death:

I never met a foreigner who cared as wisely for the Vietnamese, or about ordinary people everywhere under the heel of great power, as Philip Jones Griffiths. He was the greatest photographer and one of the finest journalists of my lifetime, and a humanitarian to match. His photographs of ordinary people, from his beloved Wales to Vietnam and the shadows of Cambodia, make you realise who the true heroes are. He was one of them.

== Career ==
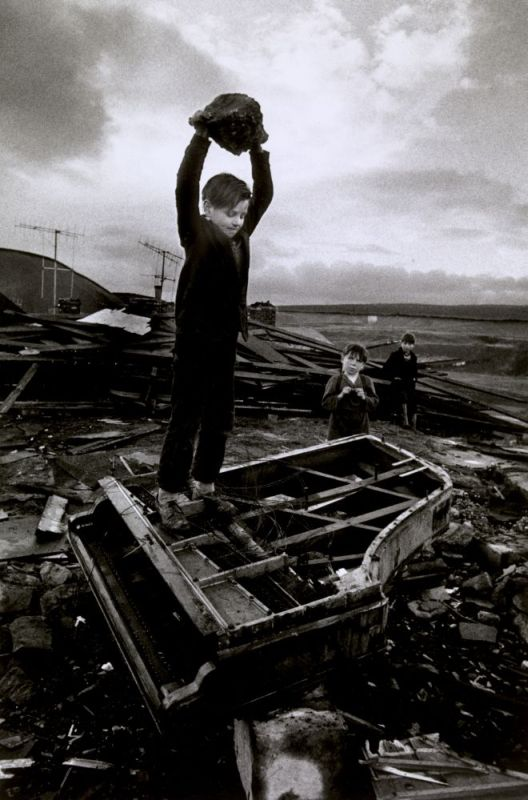
Boy destroying piano at Pant-y-Waen, South Wales, by Jones Griffiths, 1961.

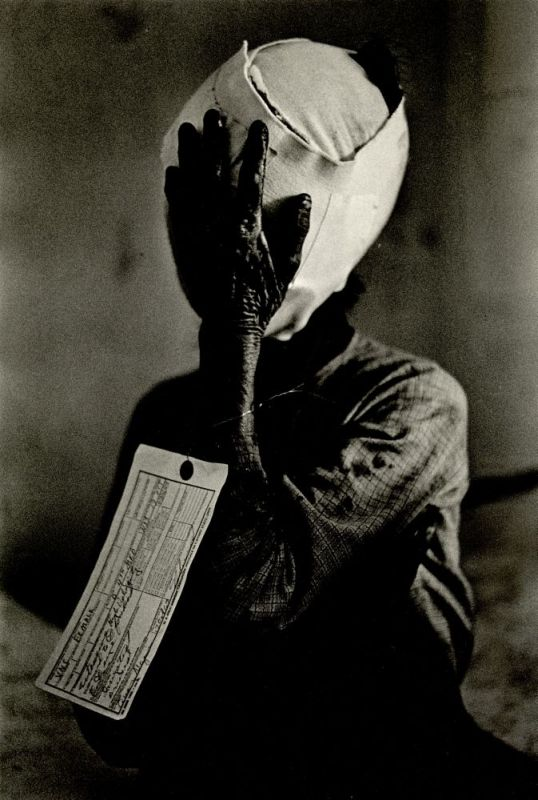
This woman was tagged with the designation VNC (Vietnamese civilian), Vietnam, by Jones Griffiths, 1967.

Griffiths started work as a full-time freelance photographer in 1961 for The Observer, travelling to Algeria in 1962. He arrived in Vietnam in 1966, working for the Magnum agency.

Magnum found his images difficult to sell to American magazines, as they concentrated on the suffering of the Vietnamese people and reflected his view of the war as an episode in the continuing decolonisation of former European possessions. However, he was eventually able to get a scoop that the American outlets liked: photographs of Jackie Kennedy holidaying with a male friend in Cambodia. The proceeds from these photos enabled him to continue his coverage of Vietnam and to publish Vietnam Inc. in 1971.

Vietnam Inc. had a major influence on American perceptions of the war, and became a classic of photojournalism. The book was the result of Griffiths' work between 1966 and 1971 in the country, and it stands as one of the most detailed surveys of any conflict. It includes critical descriptions of the horrors of the war as well as a study of Vietnamese rural life, and views from serving American soldiers. Probably one of its most quoted passages is of a US army source discussing napalm:

We sure are pleased with those backroom boys at Dow. The original product wasn't so hot – if the gooks were quick they could scrape it off. So the boys started adding polystyrene – now it sticks like shit to a blanket. But if the gooks jumped under water it stopped burning, so they started adding Willie Peter (white phosphorus) so's to make it burn better. And just one drop is enough, it'll keep on burning right down to the bone so they die anyway from phosphorus poisoning.

Henri Cartier-Bresson said: "Not since Goya has anyone portrayed war like Philip Jones Griffiths." The South Vietnamese president, Nguyễn Văn Thiệu, criticised his work, remarking "Let me tell you there are many people I don't want back in my country, but I can assure you Mr. Griffiths' name is at the top of the list."

In 1973, Griffiths covered the Yom Kippur War. He then worked in Cambodia from 1973 to 1975. In 1980, he became the president of Magnum, a position he held for five years. In 2001 Vietnam Inc. was reprinted with a foreword by Noam Chomsky. Subsequent books have included Dark Odyssey, a collection of his best pictures, and Agent Orange, dealing with the impact of the US defoliant Agent Orange on postwar generations in Vietnam.

== Philip Jones Griffiths Foundation for the Study of War ==
After becoming aware of his terminal condition in 2001, Jones Griffiths launched a Foundation to preserve his archives. As trustees, his two daughters helm the Foundation. In 2015, the National Library of Wales in Aberystwyth acquired the entire Philip Jones Griffiths archive, which includes approximately 150,000 slides and 30,000 prints.

== Books ==
- Vietnam, Inc. ISBN 978-0-7148-4603-3.
  - New York: Collier (Macmillan), 1971.
  - London: Phaidon, 2001, with a reprint in 2006.
- Dark Odyssey. New York: Aperture, 1996. ISBN 978-0-89381-645-2.
- Agent Orange: Collateral Damage in Vietnam. London: Trolley, 2004. ISBN 978-1-904563-05-1.
- Vietnam at Peace. London: Trolley, 2005. ISBN 978-1-904563-38-9.
- Recollections. London: Trolley, 2008. ISBN 978-1-904563-70-9.
