= Jon Lowenstein =

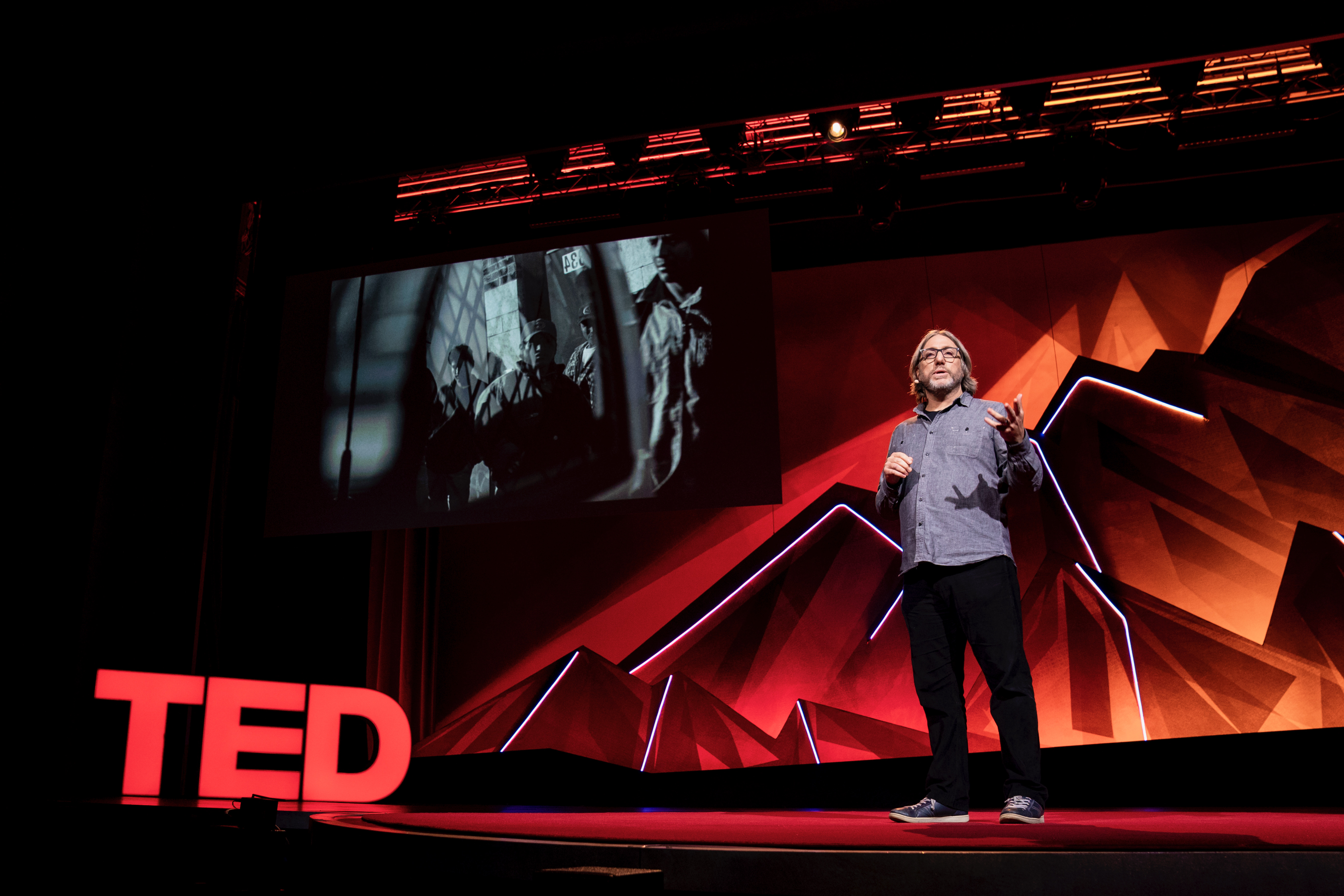
- Jon Lowenstein at the 2019 TED Summit
- Born: Jonathan Scott Lowenstein; January 16, 1970 (age 56); Boston, Massachusetts
- Known for: Photography/Film Director/Visual Artist
- Awards: Guggenheim Fellowship in photography 2011
- Website: jonlowenstein.com

Jon Lowenstein (born January 16, 1970) is an American documentary photographer, filmmaker, and visual artist. His work focuses on confronting the complex issues of wealth inequality, structural racism, and violence.

His extensive body of work has been recognized and featured in exhibitions and museums internationally, as well as The New Yorker, The New York Times, NewsWeek and on Channel 4, a British public-service television broadcaster. He has also been a guest several times on NPR discussing issues of poverty and violence. He is a member and owner of NOOR photo agency, a cooperative photojournalist agency located in the Netherlands. He is widely known as the first person to do a documentary photography drop in Web3 in the summer of 2020.

== Life and work ==
Lowenstein was born in Boston, Massachusetts. He graduated from the University of Iowa with a BA in English and completed additional study towards a Master's Degree in Fine Arts from Columbia College as well as the Universidad del Pais Vasco in San Sebastian, Spain. He joined NOOR Images in 2008.

His international work has included covering elections in Afghanistan, the aftermath of the 2010 Haiti earthquake, and social violence in Mexico and Central America.

=== Long term projects ===
Lowenstein has spent the past two decades engaged in two large-scale documentary projects—one focusing on his adopted community on Chicago's South Side and the other documenting the experience of undocumented Latin Americans coming to and living in the United States.

South Side is a body of work encompassing photography, film, found ephemera, archival material, and mixed-media art evoking a uniquely American time and place. It is a collaborative effort challenging accepted notions of community, poverty, segregation, power, and hope.

Shadow Lives USA follows the migrant trail from Central America, through Mexico and the United States in an effort to tell the stories of the men and women who make up the largest transnational migration in world history. Lowenstein has accompanied migrants on each part of their journey north, swimming the Rio Grande, crossing the border with them, and later documenting individual family lives in America. Shadow Lives is meant to spur dialogue around the immigrant experience, the dangers of border crossings, living undocumented in the United States, and deportation. James Estrin, writing in The New York Times, said "While Mr. Lowenstein is hardly the only photographer to cover Mexican and Central American migration, few have done it as comprehensively over such an extended period of time."

=== TED Talk ===
In July 2019, Lowenstein gave his first TEDSummit speech in Edinburgh, Scotland. In the speech, Lowenstein outlined his work for the past 20 years, expounding upon his career as a photographer. He showed his documentation of the migrant journey from Latin America to the United states, and gave insight to his decade-long project, "Shadow Lives USA". The project documents the "inner worlds of families escaping poverty and violence in Central America -- and pieces together the complex reasons people leave their homes in search of a better life". "Shadow Lives USA" will be released in 2020.

== Awards ==
- 2026: Digital Storytellers Lab 2026-2027 Fellow
- 2019: TEDSummit 2019 Talk
- 2019: National Geographic Explorer Fellowship
- 2014: Dorothea Lange-Paul Taylor Prize
- 2014: TED Senior Fellow
- 2012: Open Society Foundation’s Audience Engagement Grant
- 2012: Hasselblad Master
- 2011: Guggenheim fellow in Photography for the South Side project.
- 2011: TED Global Fellow
- 2008: Joseph P. Albright Fellow by the Alicia Patterson Foundation
- 2007: Getty Images Grants for Editorial Photography
- 2007: World Press Award: Daily Life, 2nd Prize
- 2007: USC Annenberg Institute for Justice and Journalism Racial Justice Fellowship
- 2005: NPPA New America Award
- 2004: World Press Photo prize
- 2003: Nikon Sabbatical Grant
- 2000: 58th POYi Magazine Photographer of the Year Award, Fuji Community Awareness Award
