= Tanya Habjouqa =

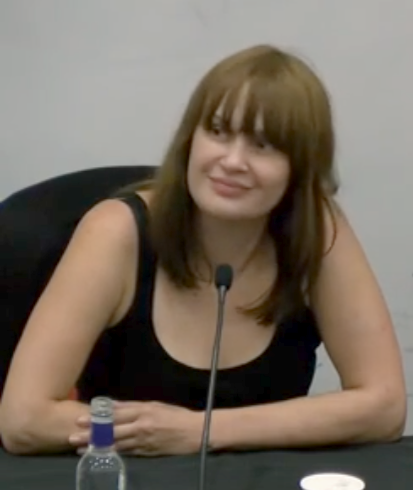
- At the 2016 panel discussion The Politics of Occupied Pleasure
- Born: 1975 (age 49–50); Amman, Jordan
- Education: University of North Texas; SOAS University of London
- Occupation: Photographer
- Website: tanyahabjouqa.com

Tanya Habjouqa (Arabic: تانيا حبجوقة; born 1975) is a Jordanian American photographer based in East Jerusalem. Her work documents daily life across the Middle East.

== Early life and education ==
Tanya Habjouqa was born in Amman, Jordan in 1975. Her mother was American, and her father was from the minority Circassian ethnic group in Jordan. When she was 4 years old, her parents divorced, and her mother brought Habjouqa and her brother to live in Fort Worth, Texas, where she grew up.

Habjouqa studied journalism and then anthropology at the University of North Texas. Early in her career, while still a student, she worked to photograph the lives of migrants in Texas. She later earned a master's degree in global media and Middle East politics from SOAS University of London.

== Career ==
In 2002, Habjouqa moved back to the Middle East. She now is based in East Jerusalem, where she has raised her two children with her husband, a Palestinian lawyer who holds Israeli citizenship.

With her photography, Habjouqa works to document the daily struggles of those living under oppression across the Middle East.

She is a founding member of the all-female Rawiya photography collective and has joined the nonprofit NOOR photo agency. Her journalistic photography has been published in such outlets as the Washington Post and NPR. She has also taught photography at Al-Quds Bard College in East Jerusalem.

Habjouqa gained recognition for her 2009 "Women of Gaza" series. In 2015, she published the photography book Occupied Pleasures, based on her 2014 World Press Photo Award-winning project of the same name. It was named by Smithsonian as one of the year's best photo books.

In 2016, her work was featured in the National Museum of Women in the Arts exhibition "She Who Tells a Story: Women Photographers from Iran and the Arab World." In 2024, several of her pieces were included in the Middle East Institute's show "Louder Than Hearts." Her work is held in the collections of the Museum of Fine Arts, Boston, the Institut du Monde Arabe, and the Carnegie Museum of Art, among other institutions.
