= Vietnam Inc. =

1971 book by Philip Jones Griffiths

- Author: Philip Jones Griffiths
- Publisher: Collier
- Publication date: 1971
- Pages: 221
- ISBN: 0-7148-4603-1
- OCLC: 207485

Vietnam Inc. is a photographic book produced by Philip Jones Griffiths and published in 1971 by Collier Books in New York, in both hard and soft back. It contains 266 black and white photographs most with captions, sympathetic to the civilian perspective of the South Vietnamese people during the Vietnam War.

The photographs were taken between 1966 and 1971, some originally shot in 35mm colour slide format and converted to black and white. These gritty, sometimes shocking pictures were described by the New York Times as "The closest we are ever going to come to a definitive photo-journalistic essay on the war."

The book is considered a classic and its publication in 1971 contributed to the public opinion against the war. The South Vietnamese government banned Philip Jones Griffiths from reentering the country in 1971, after the publication.

The original hardback book has become a collector's item. Vietnam Inc. was republished in 2001 by Phaidon with a foreword by Noam Chomsky.

== Sources ==
- Vietnam Inc. on the Philip Jones Griffiths Foundation web page
- Vietnam Inc. by Phillip Jones Griffiths on Musarium web page, archived from the original at the Wayback Machine
- Vietnam Inc. on Phaidon web page, archived from the original at the Wayback Machine
