= Francisco Toledo =

Mexican artist (1940–2019)

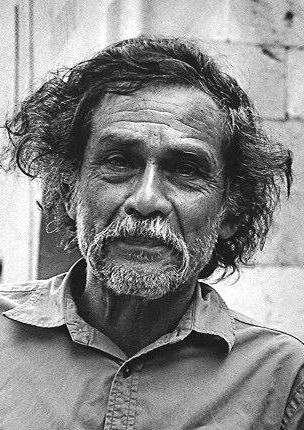
- Toledo in 2005
- Born: Francisco Benjamín López Toledo; July 17, 1940; Mexico City, Mexico
- Died: September 5, 2019 (aged 79); Oaxaca, Mexico
- Education: Escuela de Bellas Artes, Oaxaca City; Centro Superior de Artes Aplicadas, Mexico City
- Known for: Painting, sculpture, graphic arts, pottery, weaving
- Notable work: Duelo; Fire and Earth; The Peace Boxes
- Movement: Breakaway Generation of Mexican art
- Spouse(s): 1) Elisa Ramírez Castañeda; 2) Trine Ellitsgaard
- Children: Natalia Toledo, Laureana Toledo, Dr. Lakra
- Awards: Mexican National Prize for Arts and Sciences (1998); Prince Claus Award (2000); Federico Sescosse Prize (2003); Right Livelihood Award (2005)

Francisco Benjamín López Toledo (17 July 1940 – 5 September 2019) was a Mexican painter, sculptor, and graphic artist. In a career that spanned seven decades, Toledo produced thousands of works of art and became widely regarded as one of Mexico's most important contemporary artists. An activist as well as an artist, he promoted the artistic culture and heritage of Oaxaca state. Toledo was considered part of the Breakaway Generation of Mexican art.

== Early life and education ==
Toledo was born in Mexico City (Distrito Federal) in 1940, the child of Francisco López Orozco and Florencia Toledo Nolasco. He studied at the Escuela de Bellas Artes, in Oaxaca City, and the Centro Superior de Artes Aplicadas (now Escuela de Artesanías) of INBAL, in Mexico City, where he studied graphic arts with Guillermo Silva Santamaria. As a young man, Toledo studied art in Paris where he met Rufino Tamayo and Octavio Paz.

== Career ==
Toledo worked in various media, including pottery, sculpture, weaving, graphic arts, and painting. His work is known for its portrayal of flora and fauna, mythical imagery, and erotic content. Art critic Dore Ashton characterized Toledo as "a modern artist who, like others such as Paul Klee, Marc Chagall and Miró, has learned the value of the sweeping glance into the minutest corners of nature."

At the age of 19, a solo exhibition of his work in Fort Worth, Texas, received international attention. Toledo lived and worked in Paris starting in 1960 and returned to Mexico in 1965. He lived briefly in New York in the late 1970s, holding an exhibition at the Everson Museum of Art in Syracuse, New York. In 1980, Mexico City's Museo de Arte Moderno hosted a retrospective of his art. His work was shown at both the Museo del Palacio de Bellas Artes in Mexico City and the Mexican Fine Arts Center Museum of Chicago in 1984. Toledo settled in Oaxaca in the 1980s.

Toledo was featured at the Venice Biennale in 1997. An exhibition of over 90 of his works was shown at the Whitechapel Gallery in London and the Reina Sofia Museum in Madrid in 2000. In 2017, the Fondo Cultural Banamex published a four-volume catalogue of Toledo's work, the result of a five-year investigation to track pieces held in museums, galleries, and private collections around the world.

== Art activism ==
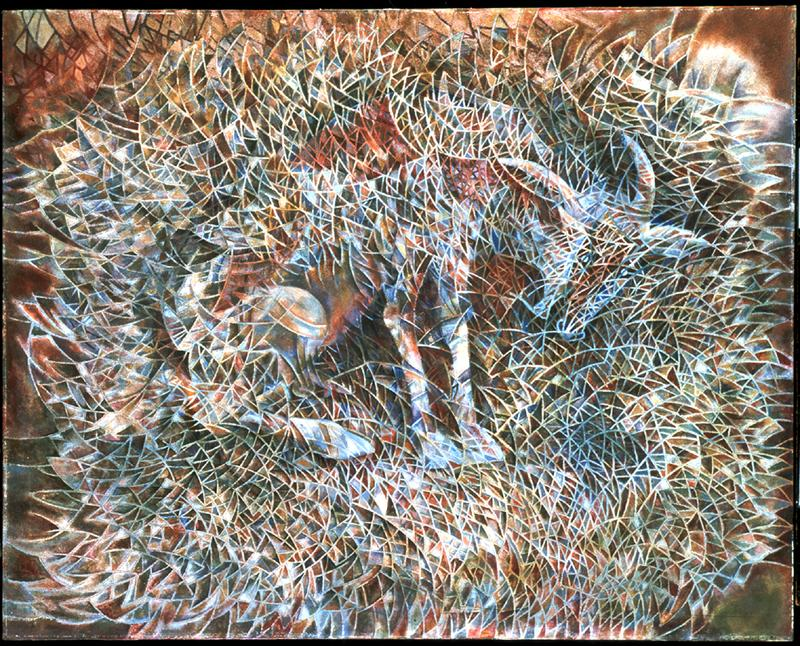
"Chivo" (goat)

Toledo's social and cultural concerns about his home state led to his participation in the establishment of an art library at the Instituto de Artes Gráficas de Oaxaca (IAGO), as well as his involvement in the founding of the es:Museo de Arte Contemporáneo de Oaxaca (MACO), the Patronato Pro-Defensa y Conservación del Patrimonio Cultural de Oaxaca, a library for the blind, a photographic center, and the Eduardo Mata Music Library. A cultural conservationist, Toledo fought against the building of a McDonald's in Oaxaca City and led protests to stop the construction of a convention center on a local mountain.

Following the 2014 disappearance of 43 students in Iguala, Guerrero, Toledo made an exhibition of kites to remember the students, honoring a tradition from Oaxaca. The exhibition was titled Duelo (Mourning), at the Museo de Arte Moderno, Mexico City, and Fire and Earth at Latin American Masters, Los Angeles.

== Awards ==
- Mexican National Prize for Arts and Sciences (Premio Nacional de Ciencias y Artes) (1998)
- Prince Claus Award, Prince Claus Fund (2000)
- Federico Sescosse Prize, ICOMOS Mexico (2003)
- Right Livelihood Award (2005)

== Personal life ==
Toledo's parents were Zapotec. He married three times, secondly to poet and translator Elisa Ramirez Castañeda and thirdly to Danish weaver Trine Ellitsgaard. He was father of poet Natalia Toledo and artists Laureana Toledo and Dr Lakra.

Francisco Toledo died on 5 September 2019 at the age of 79.

== Legacy ==
Following Toledo's death, Oaxaca's contemporary art scene includes multiple politically engaged printmaking collectives such as ASARO, Colectivo Subterráneos, and Lapiztola that continue the state's tradition of socially conscious art.

On 17 July 2021, Google celebrated his 81st birthday with a Google Doodle.

== Gallery ==
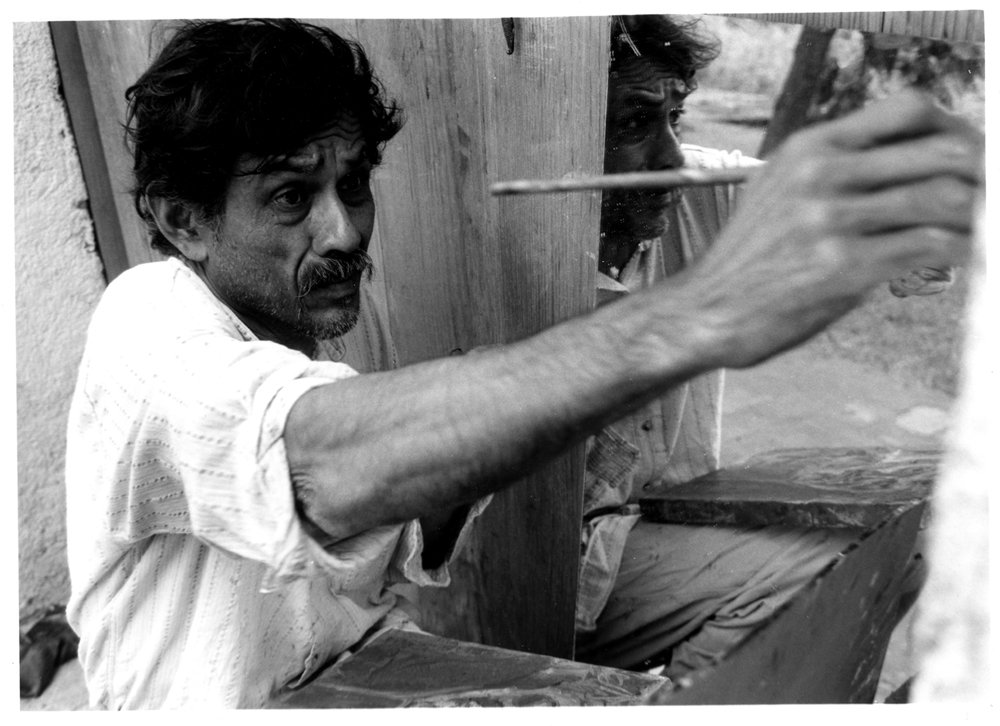
Painting

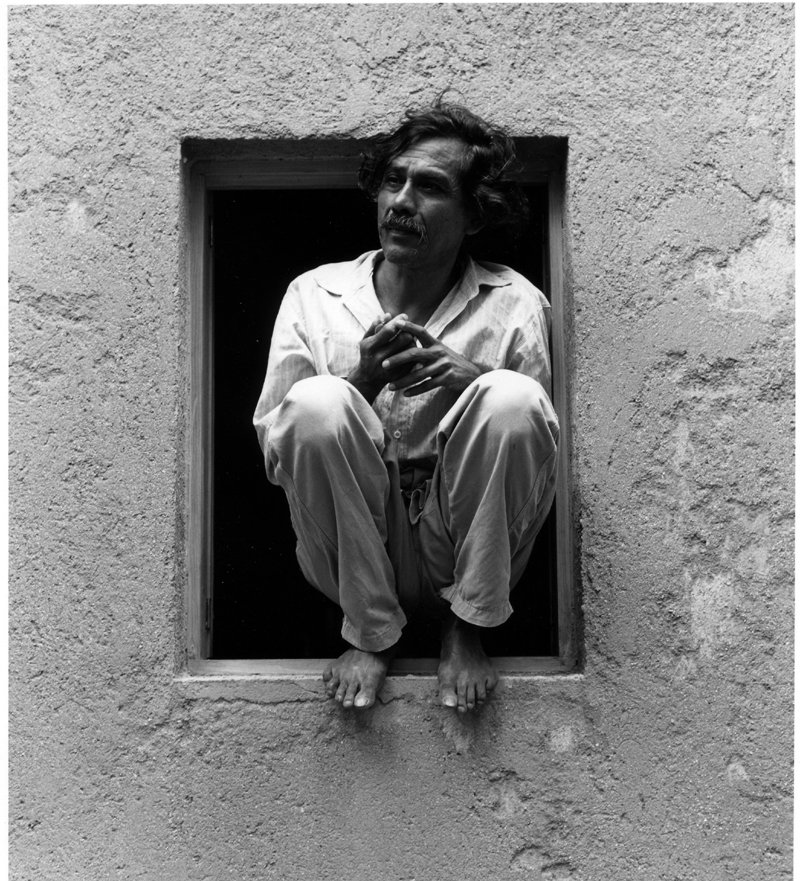
Francisco Toledo

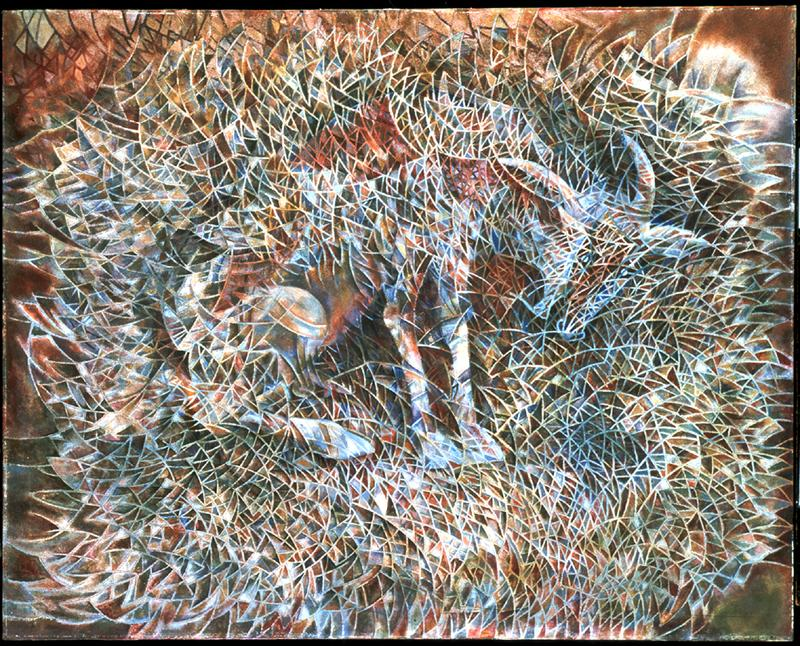
Chivo

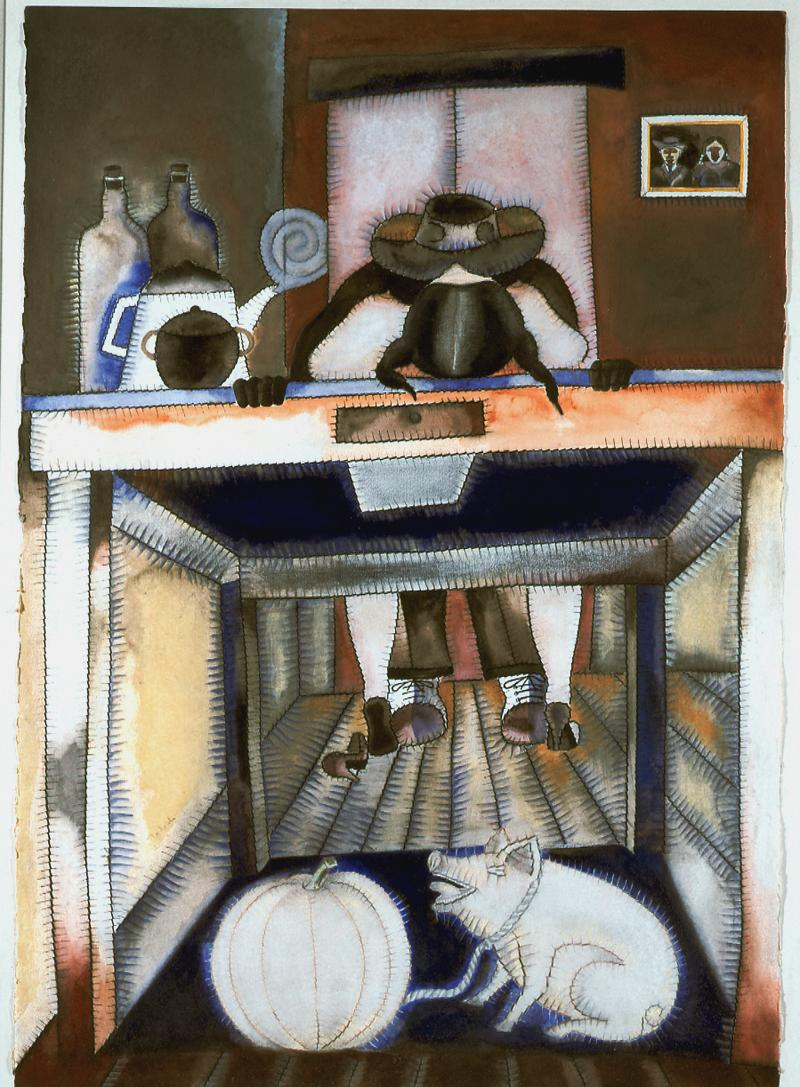
La mesa

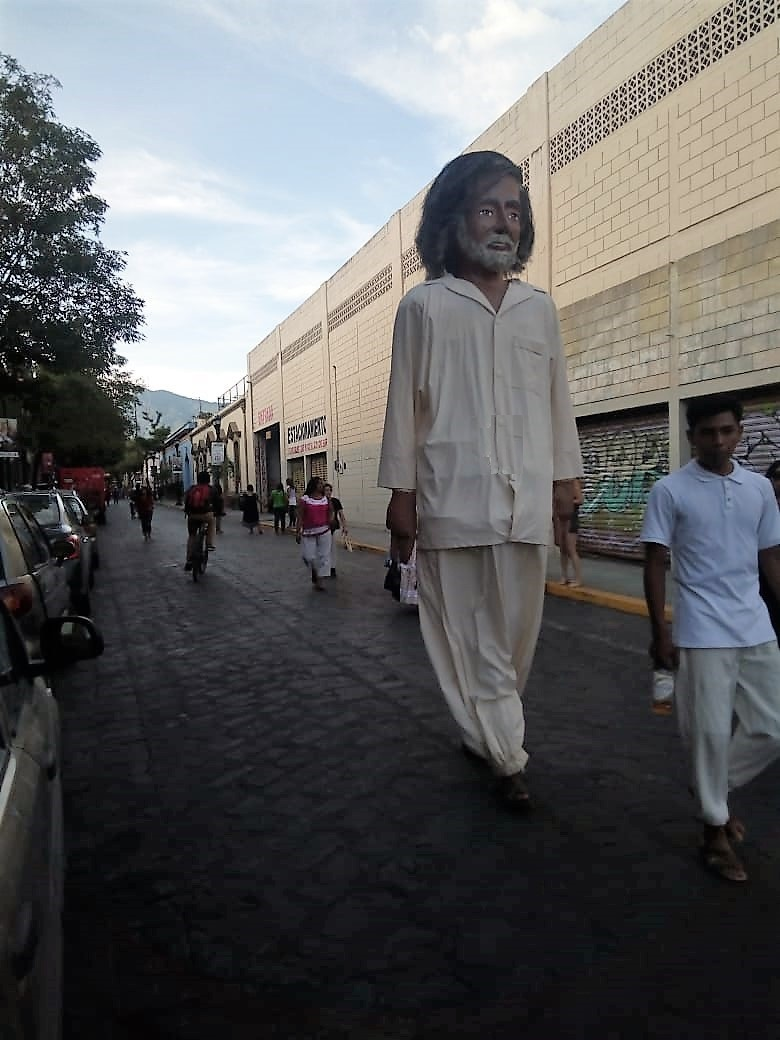
Botarga
