= Dr Lakra =

Mexican artist and tattooist

Jerónimo López Ramírez (born 1972), known as Dr Lakra, is a Mexican artist and tattooist based in Oaxaca. He has shown work internationally in exhibitions including at Tate Modern and Barbican Centre in London, Drawing Center in New York City, Museo de Arte Contemporáneo de Oaxaca in Mexico, and Yokohama Museum of Art in Japan. His works are held in the collections of the Museum of Modern Art, Hammer Museum and Walker Art Center.

== Work ==
Apart from tattooing, his art involves embellishing found images and objects—for instance, dolls, old medical illustrations, and pictures in 1950s Mexican magazines—with macabre or tattoo-style designs.

== Family ==
He is the son of the graphic artist Francisco Toledo and Elisa Ramírez Castañeda, a Mexican anthropologist and poet. He is also the brother of Natalia Toledo (poet) and Laureana Toledo (artist).

== Publications ==
- Los Dos Amigos (2007) – with Abraham Cruzvillegas

== Exhibitions/projects ==
- 1993 Dr Lakra, Kunsthaus Tacheles, Berlin
- 2005 Los Dos Amigos, Dr. Lakra & Abraham Cruzvillegas, Museo de Arte Contemporáneo de Oaxaca (MACO), Oaxaca, Mexico
- 2010 Dr Lakra, The Institute of Contemporary Art (ICA), Boston, MA
- 2011 Dr Lakra, Amparo Museum (museo Amparo), Puebla, Puebla, Mexico.
- 2011 Dr Lakra, Museo de Arte Contemporaneo de Monterrey (MARCO) Monterrey, Nuevo León, Mexico.
- 2012 Mexican Demons and Dancing Skeletons, Holstebro Art Museum, Denmark
- 2019 Diario de Viaje, Instituto de Artes Gráficas de Oaxaca (IAGO), Mexico

=== Group exhibitions ===
- Stolen Bike, Andrew Kreps Gallery, New York City
- Pin Up: Contemporary Collage and Drawing, Tate Modern, London, December – January 2005
- Pierced Hearts and True Love, Drawing Center, New York City
- Goth: Reality of the Departed World, Yokohama Museum of Art, Yokohama, Japan, 2008, curated by Eriko Kimura
- Magnificent Obsessions: The Artist as Collector, Barbican Centre, London, February–May 2015

== Collections ==
Dr Lakra's work is held in the following permanent collections:

- Museum of Modern Art
- Hammer Museum
- Walker Art Center
