= Alixandra Fazzina =

British photojournalist

Alixandra Fazzina (born 1974) is a British photojournalist. Her first book is A Million Shillings – Escape from Somalia. In 2008 she was the recipient of the Vic Odden Award from the Royal Photographic Society. In 2010 she won the UNHCR's Nansen Refugee Award for her work documenting the effect of war on uprooted people. In 2015 she was shortlisted for the Prix Pictet.

== Life and work ==
Fazzina was born in East London but spent much of her childhood in the Netherlands because of her father's employment. She studied fine art at the University of Bristol, and in 1995, before she graduated, was appointed as an official war artist in Bosnia. While there she developed her interest in photography. After Bosnia she spent much of the next seven years working in Africa, including Sierra Leone; she photographed the Lord's Resistance Army and their victims in Uganda, the Miya-Miya rebels in Democratic Republic of the Congo, and people-smuggling from Ethiopia and Somalia to the Yemen and Saudi Arabia. In 2008 Fazzina worked on an assignment for Oxfam on maternal death in Badakhshan, Afghanistan, the worst place in the world for a woman to give birth—there being 6,500 deaths for every 100,000 births. She then based herself in Pakistan.

In 2010 she published A Million Shillings – Escape from Somalia. The title reflects the fare paid (about 50 pounds sterling) by refugees fleeing from Somalia and Ethiopia to get from Mogadishu to the coast of the Gulf of Aden and across to Yemen or Saudi Arabia.

Her project Flowers of Afghanistan documents the hardships faced by young refugees making the journey from Afghanistan to Europe, at various stops along their way.

== Publications ==
- A Million Shillings – Escape from Somalia. London: Trolley, 2010. ISBN 978-1904563846. With an introduction by the United Nations High Commissioner for Refugees, António Guterres.
  - Arabic-language edition, 2011.

== Awards ==
- 2008: Vic Odden Award, Royal Photographic Society, Bath
- 2010: UNHCR's Nansen Refugee Award for her work documenting the effect of war on uprooted people
- 2015: Shortlisted for the Prix Pictet on the theme "Disorder", which was won by Valérie Belin.
