= Mara Hvistendahl =

American journalist

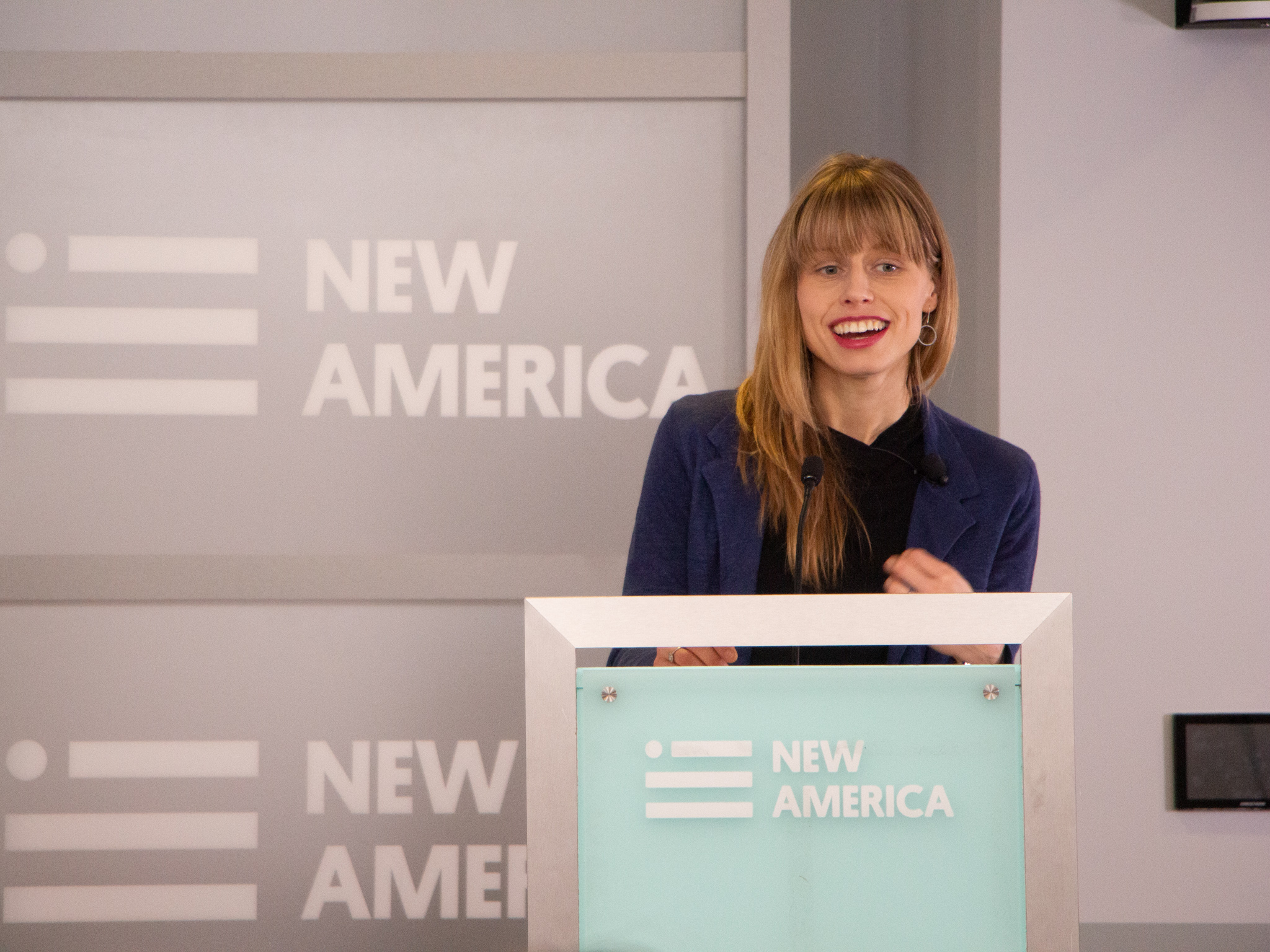
Hvistendahl speaks at the New America Foundation in February 2020.

Mara Hvistendahl is an American writer. Her book Unnatural Selection was a finalist for the 2012 Pulitzer Prize for General Nonfiction.

She graduated from Swarthmore College in Pennsylvania and Columbia University in New York City. She is former contributor for Science magazine. Her work has appeared in The Atlantic, The Wall Street Journal, Popular Science, The Intercept and Foreign Policy.

== Works ==
- Unnatural Selection: Choosing Boys Over Girls, and the Consequences of a World Full of Men. PublicAffairs. 2011. ISBN 978-1-58648-991-5.
- And The City Swallowed Them, Deca
- The Scientist and The Spy: A True Story of China, the FBI, and Industrial Espionage. New York: Riverhead, 2020.
