= Stephan Faris =

American journalist

Stephan Faris is a freelance journalist who has written from Africa and the Middle East, primarily for Time Magazine. In 2003, he covered the invasion of Iraq for the New York Daily News. In November 2004, he was prevented from entering Nigeria and later expelled from the country.

He was raised in Tucson, Arizona and earned a Master's degree from the Columbia University Graduate School of Journalism.

He authored a book on climate change; Forecast: The Consequences Of Climate Change, From The Amazon To The Arctic, From Darfur To Napa Valley. The book discusses how climate change affects the developing world.
