= Natalia Toledo =

Mexican poet (born 1968)

Natalia Toledo Paz
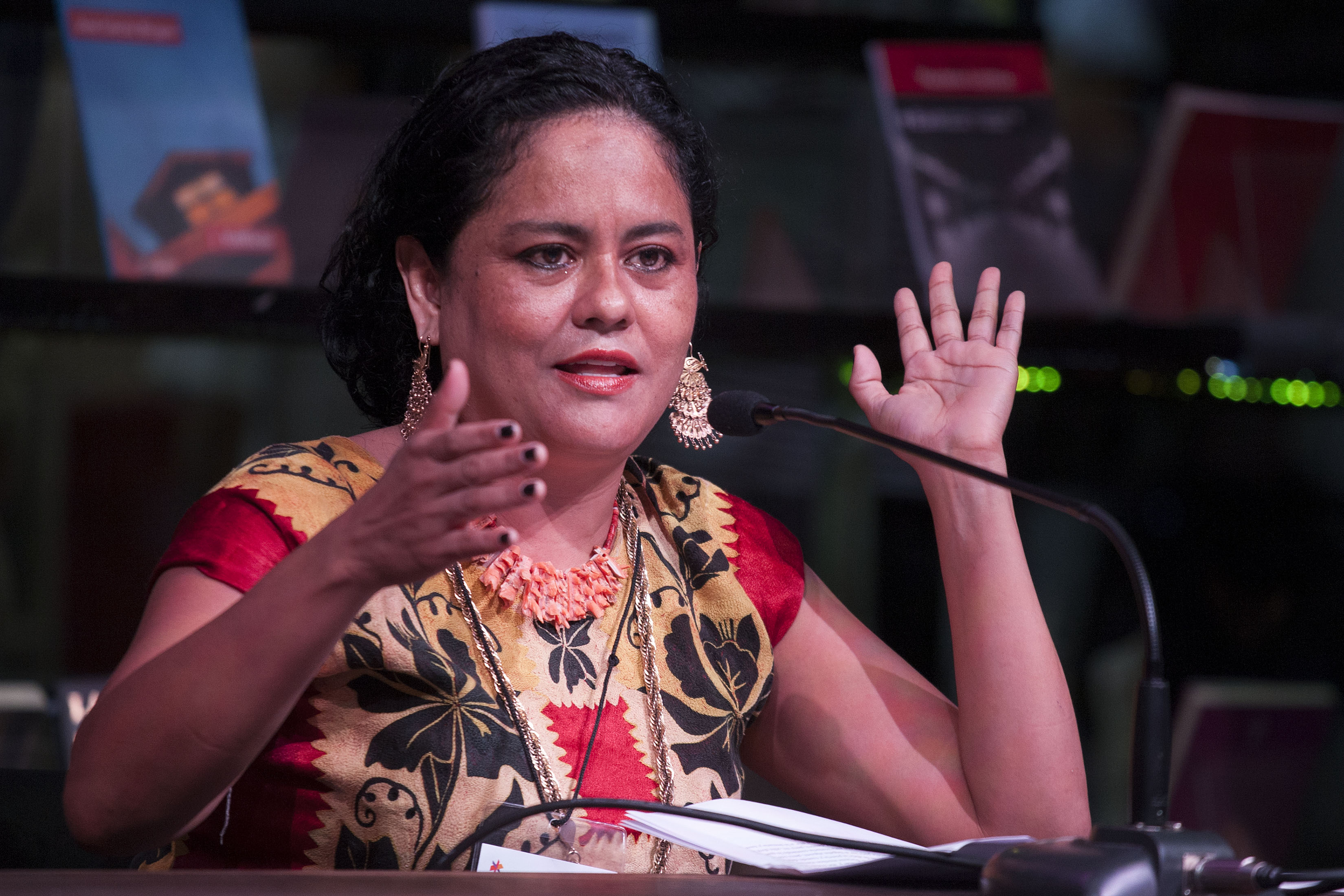
- Born: 1968 (age 57–58); Juchitán de Zaragoza, Oaxaca, Mexico
- Spouse: Jaime Garza (m. 1995; died 2021)
- Children: 2
- Writing career
- Language: Zapotec, Spanish
- Genre: Poetry
- Subjects: Women, environment, indigenous cultures
- Notable works: Cuento del Conejo y el Coyote/ Didxaguca' sti' Lexu ne Gueu' (2008), Black Flower and Other Zapotec Poems (2015)

Natalia Toledo Paz (born 1968) is a Mexican poet who writes in Spanish and Zapotec. Her work helped to revive interest in the Zapotec language. Ida Kozlowska-Day states that Toledo is "one of the most recognized contemporary poets in the native languages of Mexico."

== Early life and education ==
Toledo Paz was born in Juchitán de Zaragoza, Oaxaca. She is daughter of the painter Francisco Toledo and sister of Dr Lakra. Until she was seven and moved to Mexico City, Toledo Paz lived in a community where Zapotec was the main language spoken. Toledo Paz has been writing since she was young. Toledo Paz studied in Casa de la Cultura de Juchitán and Sociedad General de Escritores de México (the General Society of Writers of Mexico, SOGEM).

== Career ==
Toledo Paz's writing has been concerned with women and their relationship to the environment. Her writing, along with other writers' use of the Zapotec language in their work, has helped boost demand in Mexico to make indigenous cultures more visible. Toledo Paz enjoys using the Zapotec language because she feels that it has "a great aesthetic sensibility for creating images and beauty."

Toledo Paz has also collaborated with her father, Francisco, to create children's stories, such as Light Foot/Pies ligeros (2007). Toledo Paz has been a fellow of Fondo Nacional para la Cultura y las Artes (the National Fund for Culture and for the Arts, FONCA) (1994–1995; 2001–2002), and Fondo Estatal para la Cultura y las Artes de Oaxaca (the Fund for Culture and for the Arts of Oaxaca, FOESCA) (1995–1996).

She is the president of Patronato de la Casa de la Cultura de Juchitán (Fund of the House of Culture of Juchitán).

== Selected works ==
- Poetry
  - Paraíso de fisuras (1990), junto con Rocío González, Consejo Estatal para la Cultura y las Artes de Oaxaca.
  - Ca guna gu bidxa, ca guna guiiba' risaca (Mujeres del sol, mujeres de oro, 2002), Instituto Oaxaqueño de las Culturas.
  - Guie' yaase' (Olivo negro, 2004), CONACULTA.
  - Xtaga be'ñe' (Flor de pantano, 2004), Instituto Oaxaqueño de las Culturas.
  - Guendaguti ñee sisi (La muerte pies ligeros, 2005), Fondo de Cultura Económica.
- Anthologies
  - Demián Flores Cortés (1993), Palimpsesto, Ediciones Bi'cu'.
  - Aurora Mayra Saavedra (1996) Las divinas mutantes, UNAM.
  - Antología de poetas de Tierra Adentro (1997), TELAM Nava.
  - Varios Autores (1997), Historia de Arte de Oaxaca, tomo lll, Gobierno del Estado de Oaxaca.
  - Miguel Flores (1998), Toledo: la línea metafórica, Ediciones Oro de la Noche/FONCA.
  - Víctor de la Cruz (1999), Guie' sti' diidxazá, La flor de la palabra, UNAM.
  - Verónika Bennholdt-Thomsen (2000), Juchitán-Mexikos stad der fra un, Frederking & Thaler, Germany.
  - Memoria del XII Festival Internacional de Poesía de Medellín (2002), Colombia.
  - Mónica de la Torre, Michael Wiegers (2002), Reversible Monuments: Contemporary Mexican Poetry, Copper Canyon Press, USA.
  - Carlos Montemayor (2003), La voz profunda, antología de literatura mexicana en lenguas indígenas, Joaquín Mortiz.
  - Carlos Montemayor y Donald Frischmann (2006), Words of the True Peoples. Anthology of Mexican Indigenous-Language Writers, University of Texas Press.

== Awards ==
- Nezahualcóyotl Literature Prize (Spanish: Premio Nezahualcóyotl de Literatura), 2004.
- Fine Arts Medal for Literature in Indigenous Languages (Spanish: Medalla Bellas Artes de Literatura en Lenguas Indígenas), 2025.
