= Rawiya =

Collective of documentary photographers

Rawi(ya) (Arabic: راوية, meaning "female and male teller") is a collective of documentary photographers from the Middle East (West Asia and North Africa). Today its members are Myriam Abdelaziz (New York City), Tamara Abdul Hadi (Beirut), Ghaith Abdul Hadad (Istanbul), Zied Ben Romdhane (Tunis), Laura Boushnak (Sarajevo), Tanya Habjouqa (East Jerusalem), and Tasneem Alsultan (Jubail). It is the first cooperative of its kind with that started as an all female photographer group from the Arab world and opened up to male members in 2016.

Newsha Tavakolian got together with Tamara Abdul Hadi and Dalia Khamissy in Beirut in 2009 with the idea of the collective, thereafter Boushnak and Habjouqa joined the conversation and Rawiya was born. In August 2011, following the Egyptian revolution, Myriam Abdelaziz joined the group. The collective made its official debut at the FORMAT International Photography Festival in Derby, U.K. in March 2011, which led to international exhibitions across the Greater Middle East, Europe, and the United States. In 2016 Tasneem Alsultan became a member of Rawiya. Tasneem became a grantee of the Arab Documentary Photography Program with Tanya Habjouqa as her mentor. Gaith Abdul Hadad and Zied Ben Romdhane were invited to join in 2016, opening the collective to male members.
