= Paolo Pellegrin =

Italian photojournalist

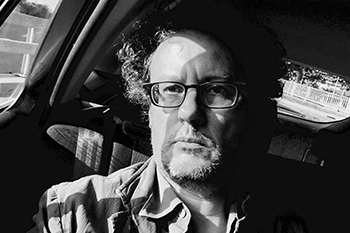
Pellegrin

Paolo Pellegrin (born March 11, 1964) is a photojournalist. He was born in Rome, Italy, into a family of architects. He is a member of the Magnum Photos agency and has won ten World Press Photo awards.

== Biography ==
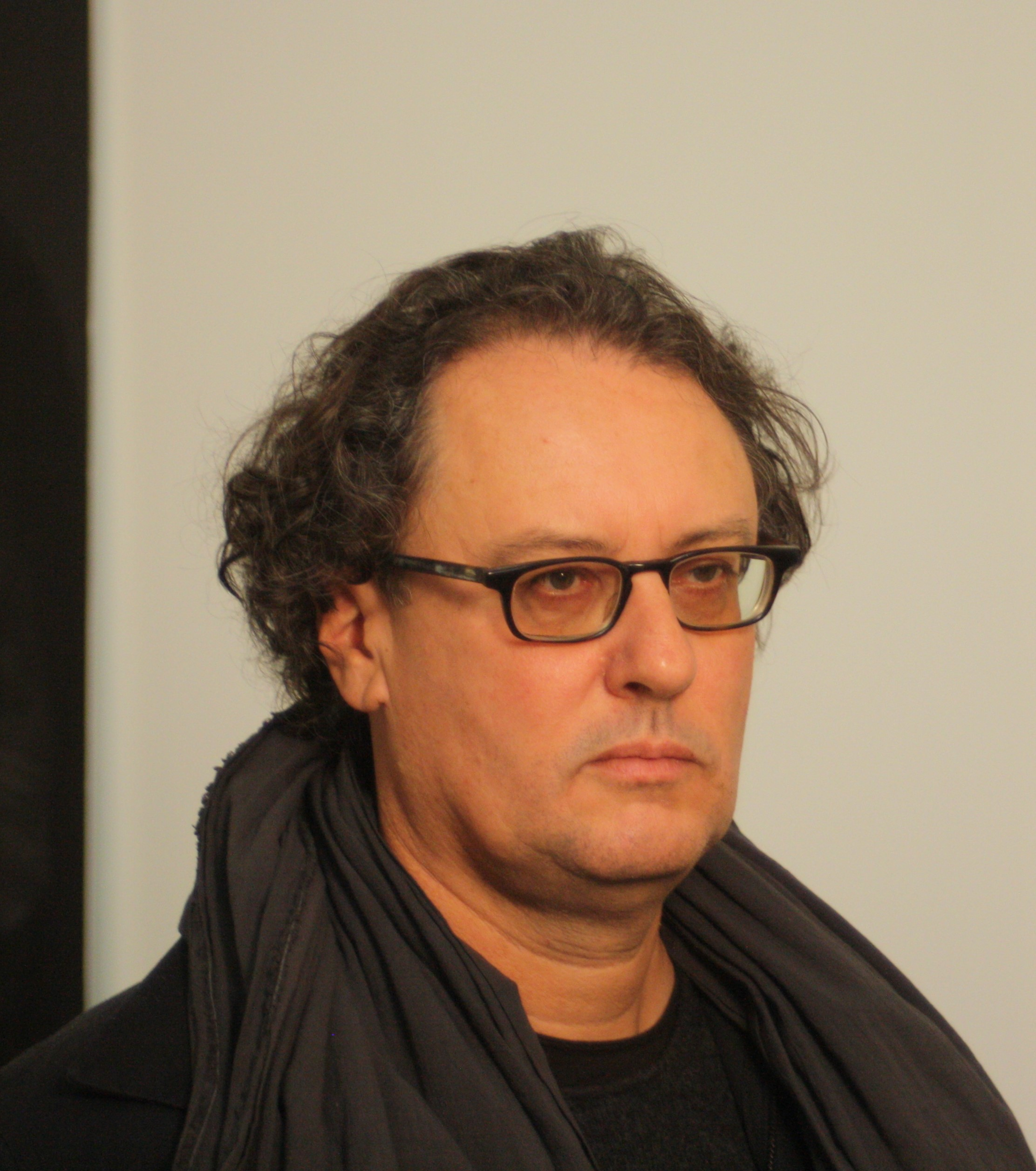
Pellegrin in 2019

Pellegrin studied architecture at L'Università la Sapienza, in Rome, and after three years he decided to change career directions and left to study photography at Istituto Italiano di Fotografia in Rome, from 1986 to 1987. During these years, he met the Italian photographer Enzo Ragazzini, who became his mentor.

In 1992 Pellegrin began working on personal projects, on subjects such as the Romani people in Italy and Bosnia and made several trips to the Balkans after Albania opened its borders. Through Christian Caujolle, he met Grazia Neri, who represented him in Italy. Between 1994 and 1995, he started working on a project about children in post-war Bosnia and travelled in Italy, Romania, Mexico, Uganda, Zimbabwe, and Kenya for a project on HIV/AIDS. In 1995 he won his first World Press Photo award for his work on AIDS in Uganda.

In 1997 Pellegrin published his first book, Bambini, on his work about children in Bosnia, Uganda and Romania and was awarded the City of Gijòn International Prize of Photojournalism for his work on children in post-war Bosnia. In 1998 he worked on a project for Médecins Sans Frontières, which became a book, Cambodia, and a traveling exhibition. He won a World Press Photo award for his work in Cambodia.

Between 1999 and 2000 Pellegrin travelled frequently between Kosovo, Albania, Macedonia, and Serbia during the war, creating an in-depth reportage on the conflict and its aftermath. He won a World Press Photo for his coverage of the conflict in Kosovo.

In 2001 Pellegrin became a Magnum Photos nominee and won a World Press Photo award for his work on anti-terrorism in Algeria. During the same year, he won the Leica Medal of Excellence for his work in the Balkans. He began to travel extensively, covering news events mainly in the Middle East and Africa. In 2002 he published the book Kosovo 1999-2000: The Flight of Reason and won the German Hansel Mieth Prize for a story in Bosnia. In 2003 he travelled to cover the US-led invasion of Iraq. In 2004 he began travelling to Darfur to cover humanitarian crisis and won the Olivier Rebbot prize by the Overseas Press Club, USA, for his coverage of Darfur. He also won a World Press Photo award for his reportage on Yasser Arafat’s funeral. With Thomas Dworzak, Alex Majoli and Ilkka Uimonen, created Off Broadway, a traveling multi-media project. He became a Magnum Photos full member in 2005. In the same year he covered the aftermath of the tsunami and hurricane Katrina and won two World Press Photo awards, one for his work on the funeral of Pope John Paul II, and another for the reportage on the backstage of fashion shows in New York City.

In 2006 Pellegrin travelled to Lebanon to cover the war, where he was injured in Tyre. He won a World Press Photo award for his work in Lebanon and the W. Eugene Smith Grant in Humanistic Photography for his long-term project on Islam. In 2007 he was awarded the Robert Capa Gold medal by the Overseas Press Club for his work on the war in Lebanon and won the Leica European Publishers Award for Photography, as the result of which his As I Was Dying was published in seven languages.

In 2013 Pellegrin won his tenth World Press Photo Award.
