= 2014 Birbhum gang rape case =

Crime in West Bengal, India

The 2014 Birbhum gang rape case was the gang rape of a 20-year-old girl on 21 January 2014 in Birbhum district of West Bengal on the orders of a local so-called arbitration body. The 20-year-old girl from Subolpur village was gang-raped by a group of people, as a punishment ordered by Salishi Sabha, a village kangaroo court, for having affair with a boy of a different community.

On 19 September 2014, a district court found all 13 persons accused guilty and sentenced them to 20 years imprisonment, the minimum sentence under section 376(D) of IPC.

== Incident ==
The incident took place on 21 January 2014 at Subolpur (Subhalpur) village within Labhpur police station area in the tribal-dominated Birbhum district. Previously, on 20 January, "summoned" by the Salishi Sabha, the victim and her boyfriend were caught, and detained through the day and night, they were allegedly tied to a tree and also assaulted. Next, they were ordered by the kangaroo court to pay a Rs 50,000 fine. When the girl was unable to pay the fine, the gang rape was ordered.

The Salishi Sabha, a kangaroo court, was organised by the Gram Sabha, a village-level self-government institution, under the leadership of an elected Gram Panchayat leader. Sunil Soren, head of the Salishi Sabha, was also one of the rapists.

== Aftermath ==
The incident received international news coverage, especially as it came three days after the Madhyamgram rape and murder case made headlines, where a 16-year-old girl employee of a fitness centre was gang-raped twice in a moving vehicle in Kolkata, in October 2013. Thereafter her family were hounded out of their home and then she was set ablaze at their new residence.

Soon, the Birbhum Superintendent of police C. Sudhakar was removed after the incident. The state governor, M. K. Narayanan called for a ban on such courts by governments of all Indian states.

The Government of West Bengal banned kangaroo courts, especially among the tribal-dominated areas. Though there were some demonstrations by tribal leaders who claimed they were part of their tradition and such moves would constitute interference in the community's ways of dispensing judgment. On 24 January 2014, the Supreme Court of India directed the District Judge of Birbhum to submit a report. On 28 March, setting a judicial precedent, the Supreme Court in suo motu notice directed the West Bengal government to take "concrete actions" in the case.

== Arrests ==
While the girl was admitted at the local hospital in Suri, Birbhum for medical examination and treatment, her family lodged a complaint with Labhpur police station on 22 January. Subsequently, an FIR was registered, the police arrested 13 persons, including Balai Mardi (the oldest accused, age 58), Sunil Kisku allies Sunil Soren (35, the head of Salishi Sabha), Chana Mardi (25), Madan Mardi (29), Suresh Mardi (22), Kartik Mardi (age 20), Jetha Tudu (21), Lalu Murmu (26), Balu Tudu (57), Ram Soren (20), Jotha Mardi (50), Babon Mardi (the youngest accused, age 19) and Debraj Mondal. One of the suspects was absconding, but was subsequently nabbed. However, when the police first raided the village to make arrests, a section of villagers resisted and additional personnel were called in.

As the public response grew, a four-member forensic team from Kolkata visited the village and the spot and collected samples for forensic test, and took statements from the villagers about the incident.

== The case ==
On 18 April 2014, investigating officer Partha Ghosh, filed a 416-page charge sheet in the case at before at Bolpur court naming the 13 accused. Thereafter in July, they were charged under sections 364(A) (kidnapping for ransom), 342 (wrongful confinement), 376(D) (gang rape), 506 (criminal intimidation) and 323 (voluntarily causing hurt) of IPC, at Bolpur Court additional district and sessions judge, Siddhartha Roy Choudhury.

On 19 September 2014, additional district and sessions judge Siddhartha Roy Choudhury in his judgement found the accused guilty under sections 342 (wrongful confinement), 376(D) (gang rape) and 323 (voluntarily causing hurt) of IPC and sentenced them to 20 years imprisonment.

== See also ==
- Suzette Jordan
- Nadia nun rape case
- Kathua rape case
