= Tyler Ziegel =

U.S. Marine, recipient of Purple Heart (1982–2012)

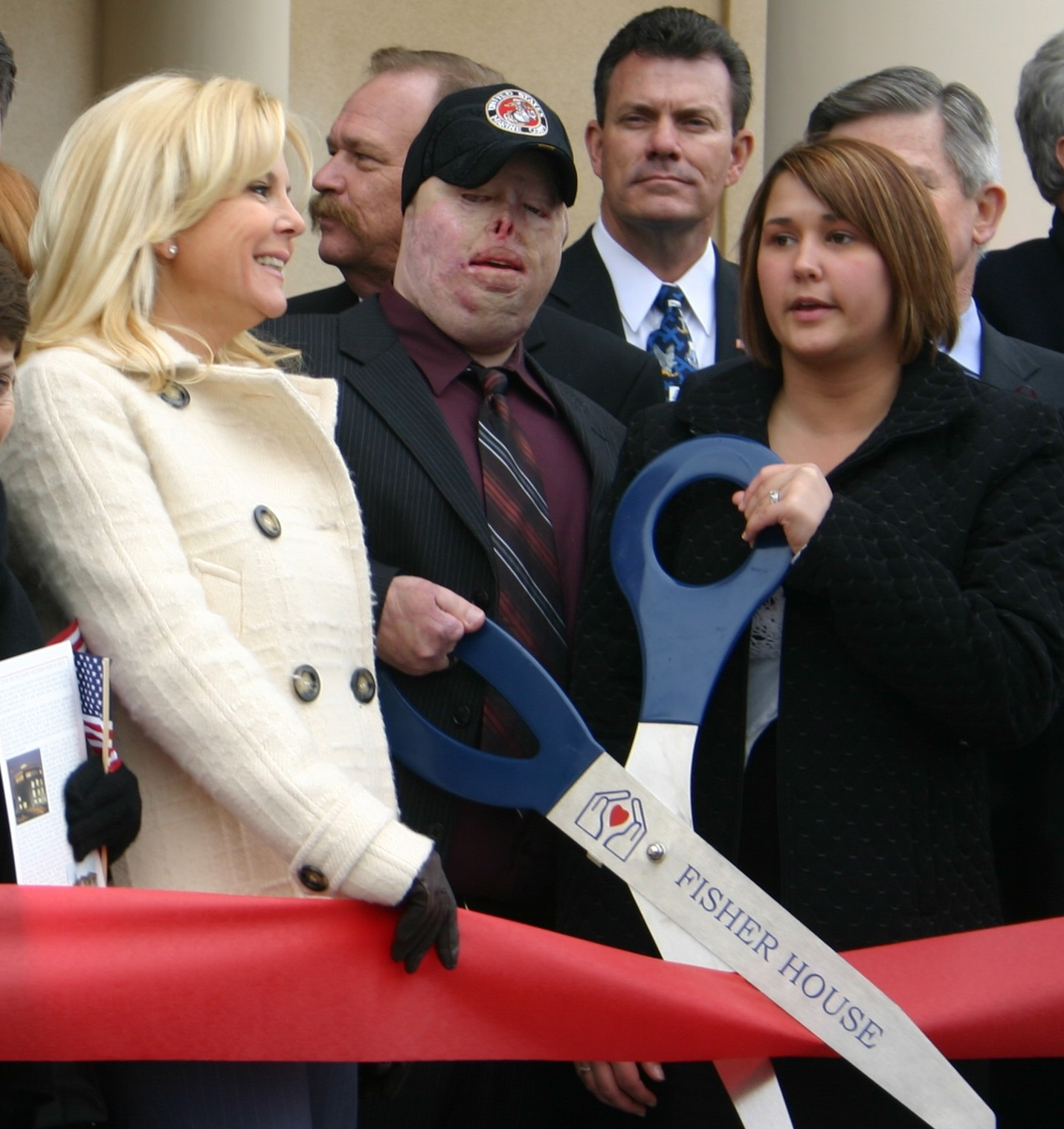
- Tyler Ziegel with wife Renée holding scissors
- Born: Tyler W. Ziegel; October 16, 1982; Peoria, Illinois, U.S.
- Died: December 26, 2012 (aged 30); Illinois, U.S.
- Occupation: United States Marine
- Spouse: Renée Kline (2006–2007)

Tyler W. Ziegel (October 16, 1982 – December 26, 2012) was a United States Marine Corps sergeant who suffered severe injuries and burns during the Iraq War as the result of a suicide bombing. He was awarded the Purple Heart medal.

== Biography ==
=== Early life ===
Ziegel was born in Peoria, Illinois, and was the elder of two sons of Jeffrey and Rebecca Ziegel. His father worked in construction and his mother was a waitress.

=== U.S. Marine (2001–2004) ===
After high school, Ziegel joined the U.S. Marine Corps. In 2003, following his recruit training, he was sent to serve in Iraq.

==== Bombing ====
On December 22, 2004, Marine Sgt. Ziegel and six other marines were part of a convoy coming back to Al Asad Air Base from al-Qaim in northwestern Iraq, when a suicide bomber detonated an explosive device near their truck.

Ziegel survived but suffered serious injuries. His left arm was later amputated below the elbow, three fingers of his right hand were lost and, in place of the thumb, a big toe was transplanted. Ziegel became blind in one eye, and his ears, nose, and lips were burned off. He also had shrapnel in his skull and a hole in the bone above the brow. For future use, part of Ziegel's skull was implanted into the fatty tissues of the upper part of his body and an artificial plate was placed in its stead. Ziegel also lost his tear duct; it was replaced by a prosthesis. Some parts of his face that were lost failed to recover, even after more than 30 surgeries.

=== Post-military (2004–2012) ===
After the tragedy, Ziegel tried to live a socially active life. He was unable to work, and the United States Department of Veterans Affairs (VA) paid him benefits. However, in 2007, Ziegel started a dispute with the VA over the size of the monthly compensation. Instead of the expected $4,000, initially he was awarded $2,700, which, according to Ziegel, was not enough to comfortably raise a family. Then Ziegel took part in the CNN program Special Investigations Unit, after which his financial demands were met. That program attracted the attention of a wide audience, many of whom expressed their support to Ziegel, including Medal of Honor recipient Hershel W. Williams.

=== Death ===
His family announced that Ziegel died on December 26, 2012, from an overdose of alcohol and morphine. In early May 2013, after an investigation of Ziegel's death, Peoria County Coroner Johnna Ingersoll said that death was caused by alcohol and drug intoxication. The analysis showed that Ziegel had a blood alcohol level of 0.123% and a level of morphine indicating the presence of heroin was 540 ng/ml. The cause of death, according to Ingersoll, was the combination of these substances. The coroner's jury acknowledged that Ziegel's death was accidental.

==== Reactions ====
About 2,000 flags lined the streets of Metamora for miles in memory of Ziegel.

In February 2013, Pat Quinn, the Governor of Illinois, referred in his State of the State address to the history of Ziegel as an example of the courage needed by state legislators. He said, "What we all need in this coming session is courage, real political courage to do the right thing. We don't need to look any further for examples of courage than our men and women in uniform. Men like Sergeant Tyler Ziegel, a proud Marine who grew up in Metamora, Illinois ..."

== Personal life ==
=== Marriage and divorce ===
On October 7, 2006, shortly after discharge from the hospital, Ziegel married Renée Kline, whom he met before being sent to Iraq. Their wedding was widely reported by the press in the United States, and their marriage day was declared a holiday in Illinois. The wedding was attended by the American photographer Nina Berman who took a series of shots, one of which won first prize among portraits on World Press Photo.

A year after the wedding, Ziegel and Kline divorced.

== Bibliography ==
- Kramer Jenning, Linda. (June 2009). "Mother Courage". Reader's Digest. The Reader's Digest Association: 110–119. ISBN 9781621450740. ISSN 0034-0375.
