= Alex Majoli =

Italian photographer

Alex Majoli (born 1971) is an Italian photographer known for his documentation of war and conflict. He is a member of Magnum Photos. Majoli's work focuses on the human condition and the theater within our daily lives.

== Life and work ==
Majoli was born in Ravenna, Italy. He attended the Art Institute in Ravenna.

Majoli lived in New York City for 14 years, after which he spending a lot of time in SIcily. He has been a member of Magnum Photos since 1996 and was its president from 2011 to 2014.

== Awards ==
- 2002: Pesaresi Prize, Festival Foto
- 2003: Infinity Award for Photojournalism, the International Center of Photography
- 2004: Feature Photography Award, the Overseas Press Club
- 2004: Magazine Photographer of the Year, Best of Journalism Contest, National Press Photographers Association
- 2004: Honorable Mention, Oskar Barnack Award
- 2002/2004: Several citations at the Pictures of the Year International Award
- 2012: First prize, General News category (singles), World Press Photo, Amsterdam
- 2016: Guggenheim Fellowship from the John Simon Guggenheim Memorial Foundation, New York City

== Exhibitions ==
- Bambini, Palazzo Reale, Genova, Italy, 1998

== Publications ==
- Leros. Italy: West Zone, 1999. ISBN 978-88-87639-00-1.
  - London: Trolley, 2003. ISBN 978-0-9542079-2-2.
- One Vote. France: Filigranes, 2004.
- Libera Me, Book I. London: Trolley, 2010. ISBN 978-1907112225.
- Congo. New York City: Aperture, 2015. Photographs by Majoli and Paolo Pellegrin. ISBN 978-1-59711-325-0. With a text by Alain Mabanckou. Edition of 1500 copies (700 in French and 800 in English).
- Scene. Paris: Le Bal; London: Mack, 2019. ISBN 978-1-912339-29-7 (English edition); ISBN 978-1-912339-30-3 (French edition). With essays by David Campany and Corinne Rondeau.

== Collections ==
Majoli's work is held in the following permanent collection:

- Snite Museum of Art, University of Notre Dame, South Bend, Indiana
