= Thomas Dworzak =

German photographer

Thomas Dworzak (born 1972) is a German photographer. He has produced a number of books and is a member of Magnum Photos. He was President of Magnum from 2017 until 2020. Dworzak won a World Press Photo award in 2001 and in 2018 received the Hood Medal from the Royal Photographic Society in the UK.

== Life and work ==
Dworzak was born in Kötzting, Germany and grew up in Cham in the Bavarian Forest. He decided to become a photographer at an early age, traveling to Northern Ireland, Israel, Palestine, and Yugoslavia while still in high school.

Dworzak lived in Tbilisi, Georgia, from 1993 until 1998 where he documented the conflicts in Chechnya, Karabakh and Abkhazia. Whilst there he worked on a project about the Caucasus region and its people, the impact years of war had on the region, and the interplay between Russian literature and the typical imagery of the Caucasus. This was published as the book Kavkaz.

A few months after the start of the war in Afghanistan in 2001, Dworzak travelled to Kandahar with Jon Lee Anderson on an assignment for The New Yorker. Whilst there he found and bought a collection of retouched portrait photographs of Taliban soldiers from photo studios, which he used for the book Taliban. The pictures show a campy esthetics, close to the Gay movement in California or a Peter Greenaway film.

For a decade after the September 11 attacks Dworzak covered the ensuing wars in Afghanistan, Iraq, and Pakistan, and its impact on US politics. He produced the work for his book M*A*S*H* Iraq, examining the daily lives of medivac teams in Iraq, whilst embedded with them. The book includes screenshots of the TV series M*A*S*H overlaid with subtitles.

An assignment from National Geographic to Sochi to cover the 2014 Winter Olympics became a project called Beyond Sochi, which was published in 2014 as both a physical and electronic book. In the book, Dworzak aimed to explore Sochi in the context of the Olympics and the preparation for it.

Dworzak became a Magnum Photos nominee in 2000 and a member in 2004.

In 2022 Thomas Dworzak was the president of the jury of the "Bayeux Calvados-Normandy Award for war correspondents".

== Publications ==
=== Publications by Dworzak ===
- Taliban.
  - London: Trolley, 2003. ISBN 978-0954264857.
  - Frankfurt: Hans-Jürgen Maurer, 2003. ISBN 978-3000114021.
- *M*A*S*H Iraq. London: Trolley, 2007. ISBN 978-1904563600.
- Kavkaz. Amsterdam: Schilt, 2011. ISBN 978-9053306994.
- Beyond Sochi. Paris: Seriti; Magnum Photos, 2014. ISBN 978-2954793306.
- Khidi - The Bridge. Paris: Magnum Photos, 2021. ISBN 978-2-9579668-0-6.

=== Publications with contributions by Dworzak ===
- Georgian Spring: A Magnum Journal = ქართულიგაზაფხული მაგნუმი ს დღიურები. London: Chris Boot, New York: Magnum, 2009. ISBN 978-1905712151. Introduction by Wendell Steavenson, photographs by various Magnum photographers..
- A Year in Photography: Magnum Archive. Munich: Prestel; New York, Paris, London, Tokyo: Magnum, 2010. ISBN 978-3-7913-4435-5.
- Europa – An introduction and guide for Refugees and Migrants. Barcelona: Arab Fund for Arts and Culture; Magnum Foundation; Al-liquindoi, 2016. ISBN 978-84-617-5237-9. Text in Arabic, Farsi, English, and French. (Note: A page about Europa is here within the Magnum Photos web site with links to download it for free.)
- Home. Tokyo: Magnum Photos Tokyo, 2018. ISBN 978-4-9909806-0-3.

== Awards ==
- 2001: First Prize, Spot News Story, 2001 World Press Photo Awards, World Press Photo, Amsterdam.
- 2003: Award of Excellence, U.S. News & World Report, sixtieth Pictures of the Year International Competition, Pictures of the Year International, for Chechnya–Girl With Balloons.
- 2004: Award of Excellence, Magazine Division / General News Reporting, sixty first Pictures of the Year International Competition, Pictures of the Year International, for Chained, for Time magazine.
- 2018: Honorary Fellowship of the Royal Photographic Society, Bath
