= Photo District News =

American photography trade publication

Photo District News or PDN
- The cover of PDN's May 2008 issue
- Editor: Holly Stuart Hughes
- Categories: Photography
- Frequency: Monthly
- Founded: 1980
- Final issue: 2020
- Company: Emerald Expositions
- Country: United States
- Based in: New York City
- Language: English
- Website: www.pdnonline.com
- ISSN: 1045-8158

Photo District News (or PDN) was an American monthly trade publication for professional photographers, published from 1980 to January 2020. The publication took its name from New York City's photo district, an area of photo businesses that was once located in Flatiron District.

Time described PDN's annual list of "30 New and Emerging Photographers" as "the go-to outlet to discover up-and-coming photographers, determined on the basis of creativity, versatility and distinctive vision", and as "a career turning point" for those included on the list.

== History ==
Originally named New York Photo District News, PDN was founded by Carl S. Pugh, who was working as a photographer's assistant and sought more freelance work. He inquired as to the best way to advertise his services and was told to post a note on the community bulletin boards found at local businesses frequented by professional photographers. This sparked the idea to create a newsletter for the loose-knit community of professional photographers who populated the inexpensive loft spaces along lower Fifth Avenue (the "Photo District"). PDN was owned by Emerald Expositions and headquartered in New York.

The first issue (May 1980) cost $800 to print and carried $2,000 in advertising, yielding a tidy profit. It was distributed free in stores in the Photo District. PDN was an instant success. In time professional photographers, coming to Manhattan on assignment from elsewhere in the country picked up a copy and requested a subscription (initially $6 per year), which, in turn, was seen by other photographers back home. In this manner, PDN quickly grew into a national publication.

In 1983, PDN launched Photo Expo, a trade show for the same market, which remains the leading US show for professional photographers, under the name PHOTOPLUS. Pugh sold PDN and the show to Adweek in 1984.

The print publication ceased in January 2020, and the website was no longer updated. The future of PDN Annual and PDN's 30 have yet to be determined.
