= Mosse =

Mosse may refer to:

== Ethnic groups ==
- Mossé of Burkina Faso

== Medicine ==
- Bartholomew Mosse (1712-1759), Irish surgeon and founder of the Rotunda Hospital
- Markus Mosse (1808-1865), German physician

== Literature ==
- Hans Lachmann-Mosse (1885-1944), German publisher
- Kate Mosse (b. 1961), English author and broadcaster
- Rudolf Mosse (1843-1920), German publisher and philanthropist

== Other fields ==
- Albert Mosse (1846-1925), Prussian judge
- Anthony Mosse (b. 1964), standard bearer for New Zealand competitive swimming through the 1980s.
- George Mosse (1918-1999), German-born American left-wing Jewish historian of fascism
- Monsieur Mosse (1932-1992), Finnish make-up artist
- Store Mosse National Park, national park in Småland in southern Sweden
