= George Mosse =

American historian (1918–1999)

George Lachmann Mosse
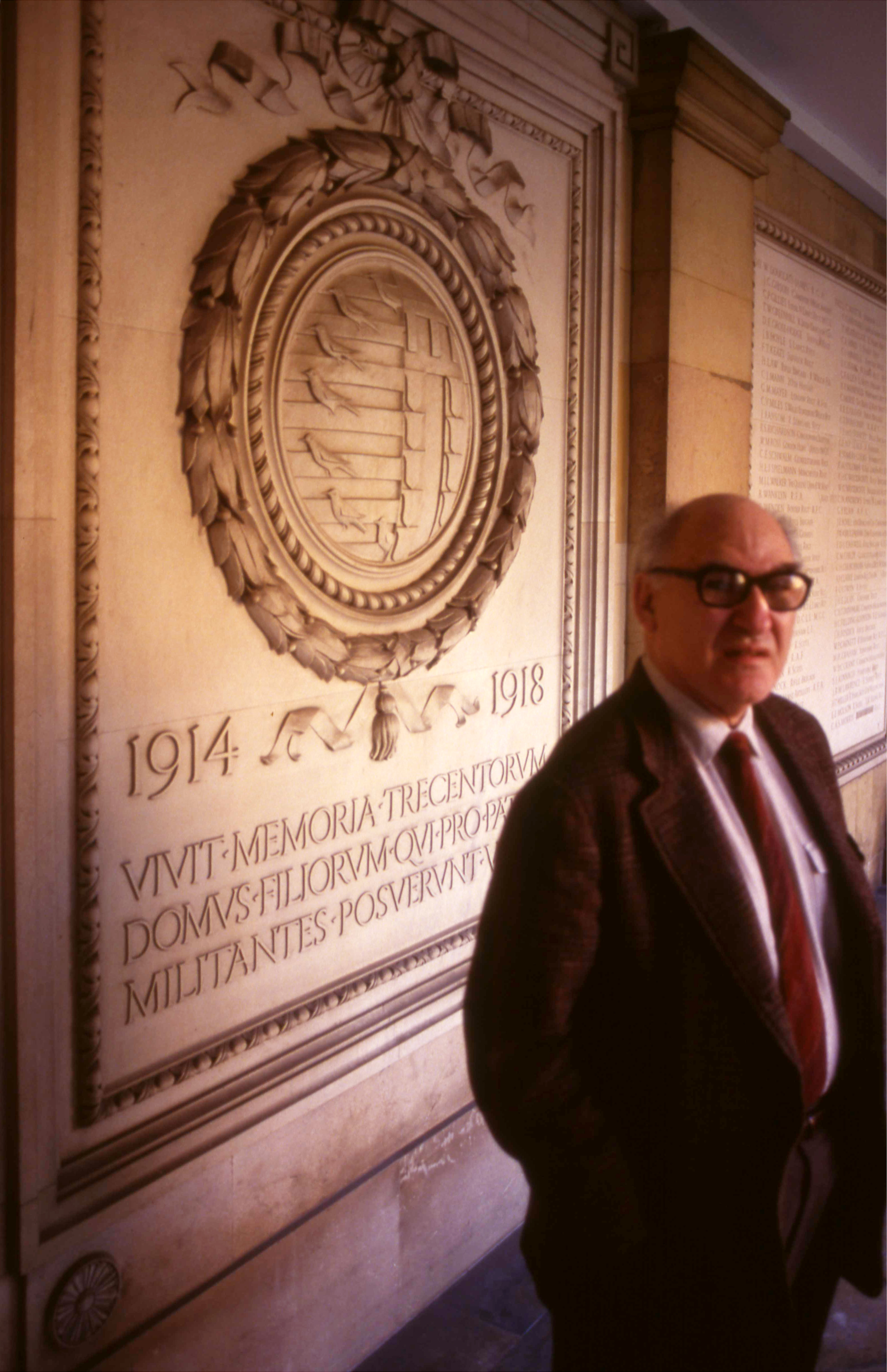
- Mosse at Pembroke College, Cambridge University, 1991
- Born: Gerhard Lachmann Mosse; September 20, 1918; Berlin, Kingdom of Prussia, German Empire
- Died: January 22, 1999 (aged 80); Madison, Wisconsin, U.S.
- Board member of: Co-editor, Journal of Contemporary History
- Awards: Goethe Medal (1988); Leo Baeck Medal (1998)

Academic background
- Education: Schule Schloss Salem, Cambridge University
- Alma mater: Haverford College; Harvard University
- Doctoral advisor: Charles Howard McIlwain
- Influences: Kurt Hahn; G. M. Trevelyan; Helen Maude Cam; Peter Viereck

Academic work
- Discipline: History
- Sub-discipline: European intellectual history
- Institutions: University of Iowa; University of Wisconsin-Madison; Hebrew University of Jerusalem; Cambridge University; Cornell University; US Holocaust Memorial Museum
- Doctoral students: Michael Berkowitz; Seymour Drescher; Jeffrey Herf; Anson Rabinbach; David Warren Sabean
- Main interests: Germany, fascism, intellectual history, gender studies
- Notable works: The Crisis of German Ideology: Intellectual Origins of the Third Reich (1964), Nationalism and Sexuality: Respectable and Abnormal Sexuality in Modern Europe (1985)

Notes
- He was the brother of Hilde Mosse and a second cousin of Werner E. Mosse.

Gerhard "George" Lachmann Mosse (September 20, 1918 – January 22, 1999) was a German-born, Jewish American social and cultural historian, who emigrated from Nazi Germany to Great Britain and then to the United States. He was professor of history at the University of Iowa, the University of Wisconsin–Madison, and also in Israel, at the Hebrew University of Jerusalem. Best known for his studies of Nazism, he authored more than 25 books on topics as diverse as constitutional history, Protestant theology, and the history of masculinity. In 1966, he and Walter Laqueur founded The Journal of Contemporary History, which they co-edited.

== Biography ==
=== Family and early years ===
Mosse was born in Berlin to a prominent, well-to-do German Jewish family. His mother, Felicia (1888–1972), was the only daughter of the publisher and philanthropist Rudolf Mosse, the son of a doctor imprisoned for revolutionary activity in 1848, and the founder of a publishing empire that included the leading, and liberal, newspapers the Berliner Morgen-Zeitung and Berliner Tageblatt. These were the most highly regarded and prestigious papers produced by the big three of Berlin publishing during the Weimar Republic, Ullstein, Scherl (taken over by Hugenberg), and Mosse.

A maternal uncle, Albert Mosse, a constitutional scholar, had helped frame Japan's Meiji Constitution. Mosse believed there was photograph from the year 1936 in which Hermann Göring and the Japanese Crown Prince (possibly confused by Mosse with the 1937 visit of Prince Chichibu) stand before his uncle's grave in the Jewish cemetery in Schönhauser Allee.

Mosse's father Hans Lachmann (1885–1944) (he adopted the double-barrel Lachmann-Mosse following his marriage) was the grandson of a wealthy and religious Jewish grain merchant. He rose to manage his father-in-law's media empire. In 1923 he commissioned the architect Erich Mendelsohn to redesign the iconic Mossehaus where the Tageblatt was published (the building was restored in the 1990s).

In his autobiography, Mosse described himself as a mischievous child given to pranks. He was educated at the noted Mommsen-Gymnasium in Berlin and from 1928 onwards at Schule Schloss Salem, a famously spartan boarding school that exposed the scions of rich and powerful families to a life devoid of privilege. The headmaster at Salem, Kurt Hahn, was an advocate of experiential education and required all pupils to engage in physically challenging outdoor activities. Although Mosse disliked the school's nationalistic ethos, he conceded that its emphasis on character building and leadership gave him "some backbone." He preferred individual sports, such as skiing, to team activities.

=== Emigration ===
Mosse described his parents, who practiced Reform Judaism and were anti-Zionist, as being, in their own minds, completely integrated as Germans ("gänzlich eingedeutscht"). He suggested that they did not take seriously the threat posed by Adolf Hitler and the Nazis until henchmen of the new regime forced his father, at gunpoint, to sign over control of the publishing house. Mosse may have been speaking metaphorically: his father in April 1933 had left for Paris seeking refuge, not only from the Nazis but also from business creditors, who had had foreclosed on the publisher the previous autumn.

Insolvency could not be avoided, and the regime seized the opportunity to force a transfer of ownership. In Paris, Lachmann-Mosse received an invitation from Hermann Göring to return to the Berliner Tageblatt as its business manager with the protective status of an Honorary Aryan (Ehrenarier); Mosse suspected that the motive was to wrest control of the network of foreign press agencies and offices that had remained in the family's possession. His father spurned the offer and never returned to Germany.

With his wife and children in Switzerland, from Paris Lachmann-Mosse secured a divorce and married Karola Strauch (the mother of Harvard physicist Karl Strauch). In 1941 the couple moved to California where his father died, a celebrated patron of the arts, in 1944.

From Switzerland, Mosse moved to England, where he enrolled at the Quaker Bootham School in York. It was here, according to his autobiography, that he first became aware of his homosexuality. A struggling student, he failed several exams, but with the financial support of his parents he was admitted to study history at Downing College, Cambridge, in 1937. Here he first developed an interest in historical scholarship, attending lectures by G. M. Trevelyan and Helen Maude Cam. Unlike his second cousin (and fellow Cambridge history student) Werner, however, Mosse's exam results remained mediocre: upon sitting Part I of the historical tripos in 1939 he was awarded only a lower second.

=== The United States ===
In 1939, Mosse's family relocated to the United States, and he continued his undergraduate studies at the Quaker Haverford College, earning a B.A. in 1941. He went on to graduate studies at Harvard University, where he benefited from a scholarship reserved for students born in Berlin-Charlottenburg. His 1946 PhD dissertation on English constitutional history of the 16th and 17th centuries, supervised by Charles Howard McIlwain, was subsequently published as The Struggle for Sovereignty in England (1950).

With others of what he describes politically as the "Spanish Civil War generation", Mosse was a member of the Socialist Club at Harvard. They were, he concedes, naive about the nature of the Soviet Union, seen first and foremost as the opponent of fascism, and the indispensable ally against Hitler.

Mosse's first academic appointment as an historian was at the University of Iowa, where he focused on religion in early modern Europe and published a concise study of the Reformation that became a widely used textbook. Here he organized opposition to McCarthyism and, in 1948, support for the Progressive Party presidential campaign of Henry A. Wallace. Despite being in the center of a conservative farm state, he experienced no personal repercussions. Against Joseph McCarthy he found allies among conservative Republicans who regarded the red-baiting senator as a "disruptive radical".

In 1955, Mosse moved to the University of Wisconsin–Madison and began to lecture on modern history. His The Culture of Western Europe: The Nineteenth and Twentieth Centuries, an Introduction (1961), which summarizes these lectures, was also widely adopted as a textbook.

Mosse taught for more than thirty years at the University of Wisconsin, where he was named a John C. Bascom Professor of European History and a Weinstein-Bascom Professor of Jewish Studies, while concurrently holding the Koebner Professorship of History at Hebrew University of Jerusalem. Beginning in 1969, Mosse spent one semester each year teaching at the Hebrew University. He also held appointments as a visiting professor at the University of Tel Aviv and LMU Munich. After retiring from the University of Wisconsin in 1989, he taught at Cambridge University and Cornell University. He was named the first research historian in residence at the U.S. Holocaust Memorial Museum.

== Scholarship ==
Mosse's first published work was a 1947 paper in the Economic History Review describing the Anti-Corn Law League. He claimed that this was the first time the landed gentry had tried to organize a mass movement in order to counter their opponents. In The Holy Pretence (1957), he suggested that a thin line divides truth and falsehood in Puritan casuistry. Mosse declared that he approached history not as narrative, but as a series of questions and possible answers. The narrative provides the framework within which the problem of interest can be addressed. A constant theme in his work is the fate of liberalism. Critics pointed out that he had made Lord Chief Justice Sir Edward Coke, the chief character of his book The Struggle for Sovereignty in England (1950), into a liberal long before liberalism had come into existence. Reviewers noted that the sub-text in his The Culture of Western Europe (1961) was the triumph of totalitarianism over liberalism.

His most well-known book, The Crisis of German Ideology: Intellectual Origins of the Third Reich (1964), analyzes the origins of the nationalist belief system. Mosse claimed, however, that it was not until his book The Nationalization of the Masses (1975), which dealt with the sacralization of politics, that he began to put his own stamp upon the analysis of cultural history. He started to write it in the Jerusalem apartment of the historian Jacob Talmon, surrounded by the works of Rousseau. Mosse sought to draw attention to the role played by myth, symbol, and political liturgy in the French Revolution. Rousseau, he noted, went from believing that "the people" could govern themselves in town meetings, to urging that the government of Poland invent public ceremonies and festivals in order to imbue the people with allegiance to the nation. Mosse argued that there was a continuity between his work on the Reformation and his work on more recent history. He claimed that it was not a big step from Christian belief systems to modern civic religions such as nationalism.

In The Crisis of German Ideology, he traced how the "German Revolution" became anti-Jewish, and in Toward the Final Solution (1979) he wrote a general history of racism in Europe. He argued that although racism was originally directed towards blacks, it was subsequently applied to Jews. In Nationalism and Sexuality: Respectable and Abnormal Sexuality in Modern Europe (1985), he claimed that there was a link between male eros, the German youth movement, and völkisch thought. Because of the dominance of the male image in so much nationalism, he decided to write the history of that stereotype in The Image of Man: The Creation of Modern Masculinity (1996).

Mosse saw nationalism, which often includes racism, as the chief menace of modern times [citation needed]. As a Jew, he regarded the rejection of the Age of Enlightenment in Europe as a personal threat, as it was the Enlightenment spirit which had liberated the Jews. He noted that European nationalism had initially tried to combine patriotism, human rights, cosmopolitanism, and tolerance. It was only later that France and then Germany came to believe that they had a monopoly on virtue. In developing this view Mosse was influenced by Peter Viereck, who argued that the turn towards aggressive nationalism first arose in the era of Johann Gottlieb Fichte and Ernst Moritz Arndt. Mosse traced the origins of Nazism in völkisch ideology back to a 19th-century organicist worldview that fused pseudo-scientific nature philosophy with mystical notions of a "German soul". The Nazis made völkisch thinking accessible to the broader public via potent rhetoric, powerful symbols, and mass rituals. Mosse demonstrated that antisemitism drew on stereotypes that depicted the Jew as the enemy of the German Volk, an embodiment of the urban, materialistic, scientific culture that was supposedly responsible for the corruption of the German spirit.

In Toward the Final Solution, he claimed that racial stereotypes were rooted in the European tendency to classify human beings according to their closeness or distance from Greek ideals of beauty. Nationalism and Sexuality: Middle-Class Morality and Sexual Norms in Modern Europe extended these insights to encompass other excluded or persecuted groups: Jews, homosexuals, Romani people, and the mentally ill. Many 19th-century thinkers relied upon binary stereotypes that categorized human beings either as "healthy" or "degenerate", "normal" or "abnormal", "insiders" or "outsiders". In The Image of Man: The Creation of Modern Masculinity, Mosse argued that middle-class male respectability evoked "counter-type" images of men whose weakness, nervousness, and effeminacy threatened to undermine an ideal of manhood.

Mosse's upbringing attuned him to both the advantages and the dangers of a humanistic education. His book German Jews beyond Judaism (1985) describes how the German-Jewish dedication to Bildung, or cultivation, helped Jews to transcend their group identity. But it also argues that during the Weimar Republic, Bildung contributed to a blindness toward the illiberal political realities that later engulfed Jewish families. Mosse's liberalism also informed his supportive but critical stance toward Zionism and the State of Israel. In an essay written on the occasion of the 100th anniversary of Zionism, he wrote that the early Zionists envisioned a liberal commonwealth based on individualism and solidarity, but a "more aggressive, exclusionary and normative nationalism eventually came to the fore."

Historian James Franklin argues that:

as a teacher and scholar, George Mosse has posed challenging questions about what it means to be an intellectual engaged in the world. The central problem Mosse has examined throughout his career is: how do intellectuals relate their ideas to reality or to alternative views of that reality?.... Mosse has chosen to focus on intellectuals and the movements with which they were often connected at their most intemperate.... For Mosse, the role of the historian is one of political engagement; he or she must delineate the connections (and disconnections) between myth and reality.

== Distinction as a teacher ==
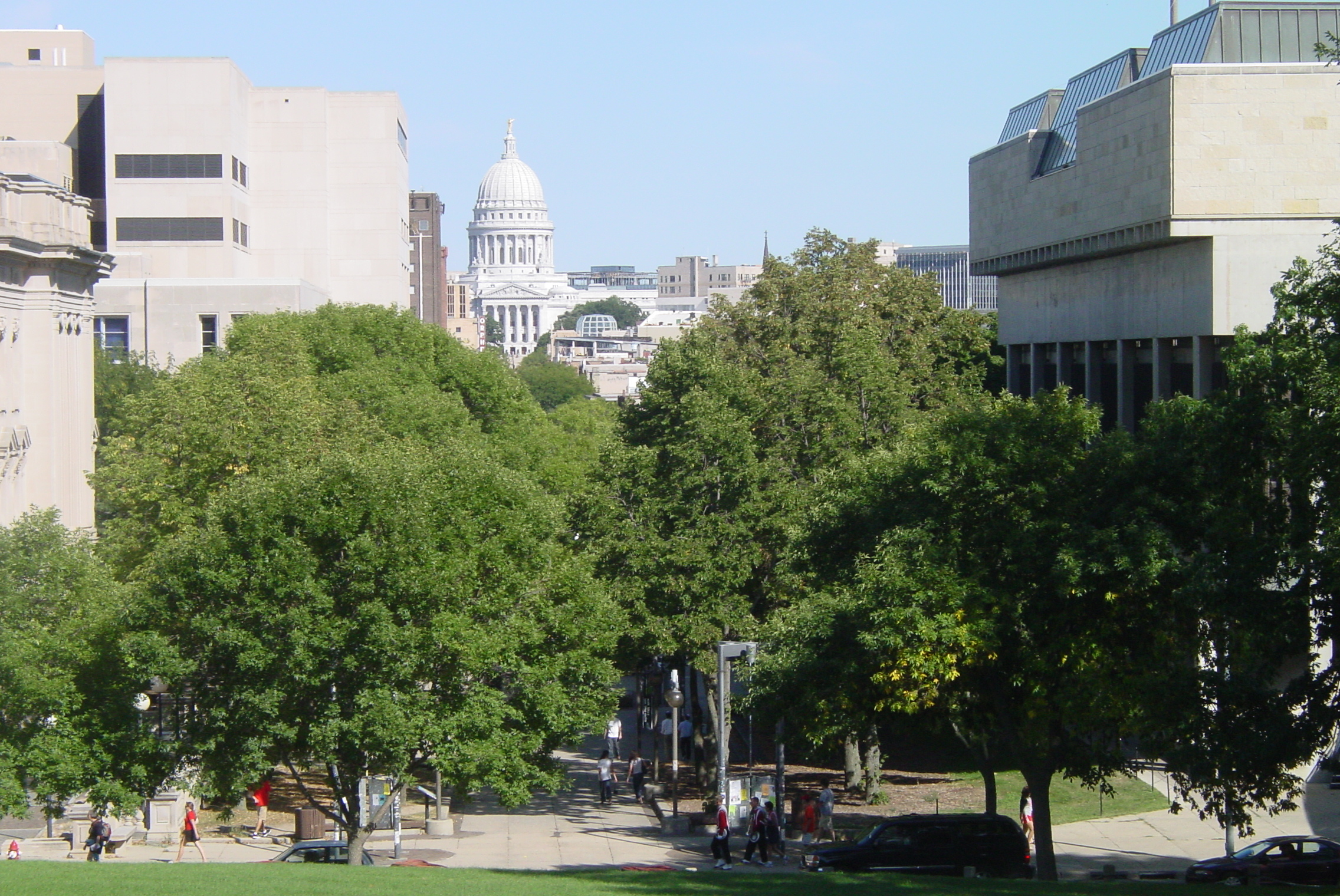
The George L. Mosse Humanities Building (right), University of Wisconsin-Madison

At the University of Wisconsin, Mosse was recognized as a charismatic and inspiring teacher. Tom Bates's Rads: A True Story of the End of the Sixties (1992) describes how students flocked to Mosse's courses to "savor the crossfire" with his friend and rival, the Marxist historian Harvey Goldberg. Mosse charmed his students by mingling critical skepticism with humor, irony, and empathy; but they also admired the way he applied his historical knowledge to contemporary issues, attempting to be fair to opposing views while remaining true to his own principles. He served as director for 38 Ph.D. dissertations.

== Legacy ==
Mosse left a substantial bequest to the University of Wisconsin–Madison to establish the George L. Mosse Program in History, a collaborative program with the Hebrew University of Jerusalem. He also left modest endowments to support LGBT studies at both the University of Wisconsin–Madison and the University of Amsterdam, where he taught as a visiting professor. These endowments were funded by the restitution of the Mosse family's properties that were expropriated by the Nazi regime and restored in 1989–1990, following the collapse of East Germany. The George Mosse Fund was created at the University of Amsterdam to further the advancement of gay and lesbian studies. The American Historical Association annually awards the George L. Mosse Prize.

== Awards and honors ==
- Elected to the American Academy of Arts and Sciences, 1985
- Goethe Medal of the Goethe-Institut, 1988
- Elected to the American Philosophical Society, 1997
- Leo Baeck Medal of the Leo Baeck Institute, 1998
- Prezzolini Prize
- Honorary doctorates from Hebrew University of Jerusalem, Hebrew Union College, Lakeland College, and the University of Siegen

== Selected works ==
- The Struggle for Sovereignty in England from the Reign of Queen Elizabeth to the Petition of Right, 1950.
- The Reformation, 1953.
- The Holy Pretence: A Study in Christianity and Reason of State from William Perkins to John Winthrop, 1957.
- The Culture of Western Europe: The Nineteenth and Twentieth Centuries. An Introduction, 1961.
- The Crisis of German Ideology: Intellectual Origins of the Third Reich, 1964.
- Corporate State and the Conservative Revolution in Weimar Germany, 1965.
- Nazi Culture: Intellectual, Cultural and Social Life in the Third Reich, edited by G. L. Mosse, 1966.
- 1914: The Coming of the First World War, edited by G. L. Mosse and Walter Laqueur, 1966.
- Literature and Politics in the Twentieth Century, edited by G. L. Mosse and Walter Laqueur, 1967.
- Germans and Jews: The Right, the Left, and the Search for a "Third Force" in Pre-Nazi Germany, 1970.
- Historians in Politics, edited by G.L. Mosse and Walter Laqueur, 1974.
- Jews and Non-Jews in Eastern Europe, 1918-1945, edited by G. L. Mosse and Bela Vago, 1974.
- The Nationalization of the Masses: Political Symbolism and Mass Movements in Germany from the Napoleonic Wars through the Third Reich, 1975.
- Nazism: A Historical and Comparative Analysis of National Socialism, 1978.
- Toward the Final Solution: A History of European Racism, 1978.
- International Fascism: New Thoughts and New Approaches, edited by G. L. Mosse, 1979.
- Masses and Man: Nationalist and Fascist Perceptions of Reality, 1980.
- German Jews beyond Judaism, 1985.
- Nationalism and Sexuality: Respectability and Abnormal Sexuality in Modern Europe, 1985.
- Fallen Soldiers: Reshaping the Memory of the World Wars, 1990 (translated into German in 1993 and into French in 1999).
- "Ich bleibe Emigrant." [In conversation with Irene Runge and Uwe Stelbrink.] Berlin: Dietz, 1991 (in German).
- Confronting the Nation: Jewish and Western Nationalism, 1993.
- The Image of Man: The Creation of Modern Masculinity, 1996.
- The Fascist Revolution: Toward a General Theory of Fascism, 1999.
- Confronting History – A Memoir, 2000.

=== Articles ===
- ″Image of the Jew in German Popular Culture: Felix Dahn and Gustav Freytag″ in Year Book II of the Leo Baeck Institute London, Leo Baeck Institute, 1957
- ″Culture, Civilization and German Anti-Semitism″ in Judaism Vol. 7 #2 Summer 1958
- ″Mystical Origins of National Socialism″ in Journal of the History of Ideas Vol. XXII #1 Jan.–May 1961
