= Zadek =

Zadek is a surname. Notable people with the surname include:

- Annie Zadek (born 1948), French author
- Hilde Zadek (1917–2019), German operatic soprano
- Peter Zadek (1926–2009), German theatre and film director
- Simon Zadek (born 1967), writer and advisor focused on business and sustainability
- Walter Zadek (1900–1992), Israeli photographer
