= Anton Kaufman =

German and American reporter

- Born: 1883
- Died: January 1, 1943 (aged 60); Robert Treat Hotel; Newark, New Jersey
- Employer: Newark Jewish Chronicle
- Title: Publisher
- Spouse: Fannie Newman
- Children: 4, including Theodore Newman Kaufman

Anton Kaufman (1883 – January 1, 1943) was a reporter for the Berliner Morgen-Zeitung and later the publisher of the Detroit Daily Chronicle and the Newark Jewish Chronicle. He was blind.

== Biography ==
Kaufman was born in 1883, in Austria or Germany. As a young man, he worked as a reporter for the Berliner Morgen-Zeitung. He immigrated to Detroit, Michigan, in 1905. He met and married Fannie Newman in Detroit on March 14, 1909, and had four children: Theodore Newman Kaufman, Herbert Kaufman, Julian Kaufman, and Leonard Kaufman. He became a citizen in 1910.

He became the publisher of The Detroit Daily Chronicle in 1914. When that publication failed, he moved to Newark, New Jersey, in 1921 and became the publisher of the Newark Jewish Chronicle.

In 1934, he was arrested, along with his son, Theodore Newman Kaufman for the robbery of Sandor Alexander Balint, who had developed a process to speed the aging of wine.

His wife died on February 16, 1939. The lack of advertising revenue from World War II forced him into financial difficulty and he was forced to sell his own gravesite. He lost his life on January 1, 1943, when he fell from a window of his room at the Robert Treat Hotel in Newark, New Jersey.
