= Treaty of London (1871) =

1871 International Treaty

The Treaty of London (1871) was an international treaty signed on 13 March 1871 by Germany, Austria, the Ottoman Empire, the United Kingdom, France, Russia, and Italy. It reversed most limitations imposed on the Russian military presence in the Black Sea that came following the settlement of the Crimean War, by virtue of the 1856 Treaty of Paris.

Capitalizing on Prussia's assured and impending victory over France in the Franco-Prussian war (19 July 1870 – 28 January 1871) and instigated by Count Bismarck, who sought to secure Russian neutrality, on 31 October 1870 Foreign Minister of the Russian Empire Alexander Gorchakov denounced the Black Sea clauses of the 1856 Treaty of Paris.

== Treaty of Paris 1856, Art 11−14 (The Black Sea) ==
Art. XI. Neutralization. The Black Sea is neutralized: its waters and its ports, thrown open to the mercantile marine of every nation are formally and in perpetuity interdicted to the flag of war, either of the Powers possessing its coasts, or of any other Power, with the exceptions mentioned in Articles XIV and XIX of the present Treaty.

Art. XII. Freedom of navigation. (...)

Art. XIII. Arsenals.The Black Sea being neutralised according to terms of Article XI, the maintenance or establishment upon its coast of military-maritime arsenals becomes alike unnecessary and purposeless; in consequence, His Majesty the Emperor of all the Russias and His Imperial Majesty the Sultan engage not to establish or to maintain upon that coast any military-maritime arsenal.

Art. XIV. Light vessels.Their Majesties the Emperor of all the Russias and the Sultan having concluded a Convention for the purpose of settling the force and the number of light vessels, necessary for the service of their coasts, which they reserve to themselves to maintain in the Black Sea, that Convention is annexed to the present Treaty, and shall have the same force and validity as if it formed an integral part thereof. It cannot be either annulled or modified without the assent of the Powers signing the present Treaty.

Russia, instigated by Prussia, based her decision on the Clausula rebus sic stantibus, while France, one of the signatory states, had been defeated by Prussia.

The abolition of these articles by Russia is interpreted by scholars of international law like James Brown Scott, as a breach of article XIV of the Treaty, contradicting an essential principle of the law of nations that no power can liberate itself from the engagements of a treaty, nor modify the stipulations thereof, except as the result of the consent of the contracting parties, by means of an amicable understanding.

On the other hand, Mathew Smith Anderson characterised the demilitarisation of the Black Sea as “extremely harsh and unprecedented. Not until the even more stringent restrictions imposed on Germany in 1919 was a state to be forced to submit to so obvious and flagrant a limitation on its military freedom of action.”

== Treaty of London, 1871 ==
Art. I. Articles XI, XIII, and XIV of the Treaty of Paris of March 30, 1856, as well as the special Convention concluded between Russia and the Sublime Porte, and annexed to the said Article XIV, are abrogated, and replaced by the following Article. Art. II. The principle of the closing of the Straits of the Dardanelles and the Bosphorus, such as it has been established by the separate Convention of March 30, 1856 is maintained, with power to His Imperial Majesty the Sultan to open the said Straits in time of peace to the vessels of war of friendly and allied Powers, in case the Sublime Porte should judge it necessary in order to secure the execution of the stipulations of the Treaty of Paris of March 30, 1856.

== Treaty of Berlin, 1878 ==
Art. LXIII. The Treaty of Paris of March 30, 1856, as well as the Treaty of London of March 13, 1871, are maintained in all such of their provisions as are not abrogated or modified by the preceding stipulation.

== British Reaction ==
As Werner E. Mosse outlined, the British government under Prime Minister William Ewart Gladstone faced public agitation stoked by the media and political opponents. The British response to Russia’s unilateral denunciation of the Black Sea clauses revealed profound tensions between foreign policy principles, power-political interests, and public opinion.

The British press and segments of the political elite condemned Russia’s move as a breach of treaty and demanded a hardline stance. Conservative newspapers like the Standard (aligned with Benjamin Disraeli) and the Morning Post (traditionally "Palmerstonian") denounced the repudiation as an attack on the "sanctity of international treaties." However, this outrage was selective: The Treaty of Paris itself had been a diktat imposed by the victorious powers on Russia after its defeat in the Crimean War. Even British politicians like Lord Russell (Foreign Secretary during the Crimean War) admitted that the clauses had been unrealistic from the start. Britain had previously ignored other treaties, such as undermining the Congress of Vienna (1815) to support national movements in Italy or Germany. Against this backdrop, the sudden emphasis on "treaty fidelity" appeared unconvincing.

The war readiness of conservative circles and parts of the media relied on emotional appeals to British honor and great power status: Benjamin Disraeli and his supporters instrumentalized the Crimean War to smear Gladstone’s government as "weak." They invoked the "blood sacrifice" of British soldiers but ignored that the Crimean War had been highly controversial domestically and was criticized by pacifists like John Bright as a "senseless war." The Times and Pall Mall Gazette framed the crisis as an existential threat, even though the Black Sea clauses primarily concerned Ottoman interests. The rhetoric served less to defend international law than to weaken Russia and preserve British spheres of influence.

The British press played a central role in escalating tensions: Outlets like the Pall Mall Gazette demanded an ultimatum to Russia and Prussia, despite Britain’s military unpreparedness. The Times stirred Russophobic stereotypes ("Slavic aggression"), while moderate voices like the Daily News warned against war hysteria. The alleged "war fever" was exaggerated by conservative media to pressure the Gladstone government. Queen Victoria personally intervened, urging restraint and condemning the public frenzy as irresponsible.

== Political Resolution ==
Despite public pressure, Gladstone pursued pragmatic diplomacy: He rejected military preparations and prioritized negotiations. This approach was supported by pacifists like John Bright, who warned that war would waste blood and treasure on trivial despotic squabbles. The crisis was defused through the mediation of Otto von Bismarck, who initiated an international conference. The London Conference (1871) formally abrogated the Black Sea clauses but reaffirmed the "inviolability of treaties" – an outcome that exposed the hypocrisy of the debate: treaties were binding only as long as they served the great powers’ interests.

== Bismarck’s Assessment ==
Bismarck, who proposed the conference, reflected in his memoirs on the opportune moment to secure Russia’s goodwill:

"In Russia, the personal sentiments of Alexander II—not only his familial affection for his uncle [King Wilhelm I of Prussia] but also his anti-French stance—provided us assurance... It was a stroke of fortune that the situation allowed us to accommodate Russia regarding the Black Sea. [...] The year 1870 presented the chance to serve both the dynasty and the Russian Empire by addressing the politically irrational and unsustainable stipulations that restricted Russia’s sovereignty over its Black Sea coasts."

On the Treaty of Paris:

"These were the most inept provisions of the Paris Peace. A nation of a hundred million cannot perpetually be denied the natural rights of sovereignty over its own coasts. The servitude imposed on Russian territory was an intolerable humiliation for a great nation. Herein lay an opportunity to nurture our relations with Russia."

Regarding the origins of Russia’s denunciation (the so-called "Pontus clause" initiative):

"Prince Gorchakov only reluctantly engaged with the proposals I explored in this direction. (Editor’s note in the memoirs’ popular edition: These communications reveal that Gorchakov’s dispatch of October 31, 1870 [State Archives XX 111 No. 4223] stemmed from Prussian instigation.)"

Bismarck emphasised that Prussia bypassed Gorchakov’s "pathological vanity" to advance the initiative, leveraging the geopolitical moment to strengthen Prussia’s alliance with Russia while maintaining British neutrality.

== Literature ==
- Mosse, W. E. “Public Opinion and Foreign Policy: The British Public and the War-Scare of November 1870.” The Historical Journal, vol. 6, no. 1, 1963, pp. 38–58. JSTOR, http://www.jstor.org/stable/3020549. Accessed 13 May 2025.
