= Morgenzeitung =

Can mean one of the following German morning newspapers:

- Berliner Morgenzeitung published in Berlin, Germany
- Braunschweiger Morgenzeitung published in Braunschweig, Germany
- Wiener Morgenzeitung published in Vienna, Austria
- Ostrauer Morgenzeitung in Ostrava, Czech Republic
