= Manfred George =

Manfred George (October 22, 1893 – December 30, 1965), born Manfred Georg Cohn, later shortened to Manfred Georg, was a German journalist, author and translator. He left Germany after the Nazis came to power, living in several different European countries and eventually emigrating penniless to the United States in 1939. He became the editor of Aufbau, a periodical published in German, and transformed it from a small monthly newsletter into an important weekly newspaper, especially during World War II and the postwar era, when it became an important source of information for Jews trying to establish new lives and for Nazi concentration camp survivors to find each other. George remained editor in chief of Aufbau until his death.

== Life in Germany ==
George was born on October 22, 1893, in Berlin, the son of a businessman. He studied law at universities in Berlin, Greifswald and Geneva. After a serious injury during World War I, he was discharged from military service and continued his studies, graduating in 1917 with a doctorate in law. He began his journalism career before graduation, writing for the newspaper, Deutsche Montagszeitung and he began contributing to Die Weltbühne in 1915. He then went to work at the publisher, Ullstein-Verlag. He quickly advanced from city editor of the Berliner Morgenpost to editor in chief of the Berliner Abendpost. Later, he was a correspondent for the Vossiche Zeitung and worked as a managing editor in Breslau.

At one point during the conflicts over the Upper Silesia plebiscite, George was put before a firing squad by a Freikorps soldier, but was able to provide a certificate of military service and was released.

After that, George was sent to Dresden and Leipzig as an Ullstein correspondent. In 1923, he began to make a name for himself as a theater critic, writing in the Berliner Volks-Zeitung and Acht-Uhr-Abendblatt. He worked as arts editor of the newspaper Tempo, as well as associate editor of the cultural magazine Marsyas.

In 1924, along with Carl von Ossietzky, George was one of the founders of the leftist "Republikanische Partei Deutschlands" ('Republican Party of Germany'). George was the chairman of the party until it was dissolved later that year. A pacifist, George was also associated with the "Deutsche Liga für Menschenrechte" ('German League for Human Rights') and the "Friedensbund der Kriegsteilnehmer" ('Association of War Veterans for Peace'), which started an initiative that became known as the "Nie-wieder-Krieg-Bewegung" ('No More War Movement'). Both the Republikanische Partei and the Friedensbund were formed by a community of journalists and editors connected with the Berliner Volks-Zeitung. George also joined the Zionist movement.

After leaving Ullstein, he worked at Mosse-Verlag from 1923 to 1928, then returned to Ullstein. Around the end of the 1920s, he began to write radio plays. His musical revue, Oh, USA was broadcast in Berlin 50 times. He contributed to Die Weltbühne until 1932. That year he published a biography of Theodor Herzl, with introductions by Thomas Mann and Albert Einstein.

== Life in exile ==
When the Nazis gained control of the government in 1933, George emigrated to Czechoslovakia. In Prague, he was the publisher of an emigrant newspaper called the Prager Montagsblatt and was one of the founding members of the Jewish Revue. After the outbreak of the Spanish Civil War he became a war correspondent for six months, writing for newspapers in Czechoslovakia, Switzerland, Austria, the Netherlands and Romania. After the Munich Agreement, George continued to live in exile first in Hungary, then Yugoslavia, Italy, Switzerland and France, finally settling in the United States. The Nazi regime expatriated him on August 5, 1938.

With an income of less than $4.00 a week, George started work in New York as editor of Aufbau and turned it into an important journalistic voice for the Jewish exile community in the post-World War II era, leading him to be called "a central figure in Jewish journalism of the Hitler and post-Hitler period."

George became a naturalized US citizen in 1945. After his death on December 30, 1965 The New York Times wrote in his obituary:

Dr. George, a biographer and novelist, who was known as a liberal editor in Germany before the rise of Hitler, became editor of Aufbau in 1939, after arriving here as a penniless refugee. Aufbau was then a small monthly newsletter published by the German Jewish Club of New York, which is now the New World Club, Inc. Dr. George marshaled a distinguished advisory board, including Albert Einstein and Thomas Mann, and built the publication into an influential weekly with a circulation of 30,000.

== Personal ==
George married Jeanette (née Simon), a social worker, in 1920. They had two children, a son, Frank, who became an architect, and a daughter, Renée, who became a book designer.

Leni Riefenstahl, despite her association with Adolf Hitler, had a close friendship with George. In her memoirs, published in 1987, she credits their friendship with keeping her from falling deeper into Nazism. However, she was accused of using her friendship with George and other Jews as "Alibi-Juden" (alibi Jews), in an attempt to whitewash her past close association with Hitler and Nazism.

In 1963, Willy Brandt, then mayor of West Berlin, recognized George with the "Berliner Bär" award.

George was the cousin of German poet Nelly Sachs, who won the 1966 Nobel Prize in Literature. His sister was married to Oskar Maria Graf, who wrote regularly for Aufbau. George's children attended Anna Essinger's boarding school, Landschulheim Herrlingen and were among the 66 children moved to safety in England in 1933.

On the 40th anniversary of George's death, his son, Frank George (b. 1921), was interviewed about his father in an article on the lives of exiled intellectuals in the Jewish diaspora. Photos of artwork of George's son and grandchildren, made by his daughter-in-law, sculptor Roseanne George (1921-2011), are in the Nelly Sachs Collection, archived in Stockholm, Sweden.

== Selected works by Manfred George ==
- Die verlorene Nacht, Berlin (1920) (in German)
- Der Schrei des Hauptmann Baldus, Berlin (1922) (in German)
- Räubergeschichten, Vienna (1927) (in German)
- Aufruhr im Warenhaus, Berlin (1928) (in German)
- Theodor Herzl. Sein Leben und sein Vermächtnis, Berlin/Vienna/Leipzig (1932) (in German)
- The Case of Ivar Kreuger, London (1933), translated from the original German
- Männer, Frauen, Waffen, Locarno (1937) ('Men, Women, Weapons') (in German)
