= Otto Ehrenfried Ehlers =

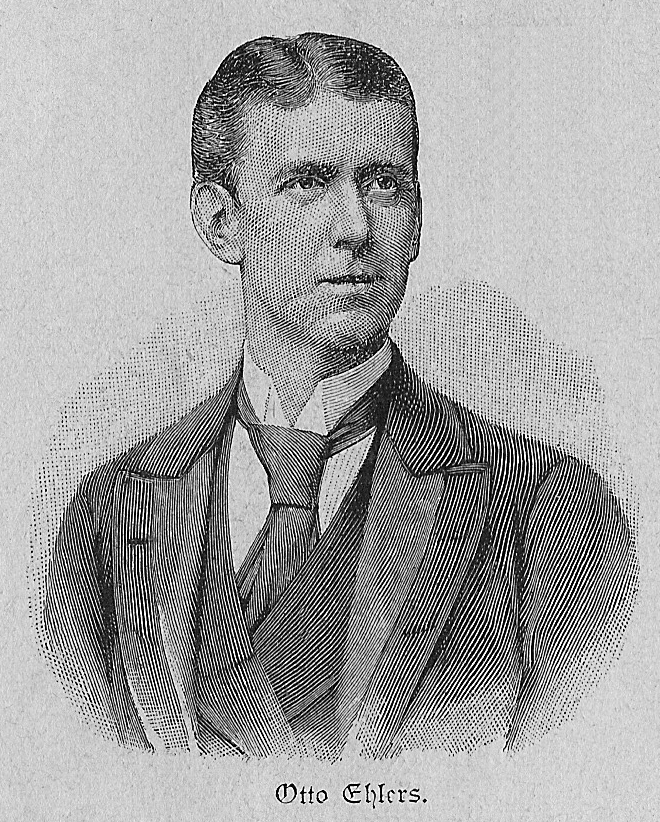
Otto E. Ehlers, from Jahrbuch der Berliner Morgenzeitung, Kalender 1897

Otto Ehrenfried Ehlers (31 January 1855 – 3 October 1895) was a German explorer and travel writer who is known in English-speaking countries for his account of a long trip through inland Southeast Asia, documented in his 1894 book Im Sattel durch Indochina, and republished in 2002 by White Lotus Press of Thailand in English as a three-part series entitled On Horseback Through Indochina.

== Biography ==
He was born on 31 January 1855 in Hamburg. He died on 3 October 1895 in Kaiser-Wilhelmsland, part of German New Guinea while attempting to cross the island of New Guinea from north to south.

== Works ==
- Kornähren der Poesie. Bremen, 1875; Bremen: Verlag von J. Kühlmann's Buchhandlung, 1880; Norden, 1888 - poetry
- An indischen Fürstenhöfen, Berlin: Allgemeiner Verein für Deutsche Literatur, 1894; An indischen Fürstenhöfen, Berlin: Berlin. Hermann Paetel, 1909 (Sammlung belehrender Unterhaltunsschriften für die deutsche Jugend, 32 and 33), 2 volumes
- Im Sattel durch Indo-China, Berlin: Allgemeiner Verein für Deutsche Literatur, 1894, 2 volumes; English translation: On Horseback Through Indochina, 3 volumes, Bangkok: White Lotus Press, 2002
- Meine erste Reise nach Zanzibar. In: Velhagen und Klasings Monatshefte, Jg. 9 (1894/95), Bd. 2, Heft 7, March 1895, pp. 81–95
- Reisebilder aus Siam. Leipzig: R. Voigtländer, n.d. (ca 1927) (Voigtländers Volksbücher, 45)
- Samoa, die Perle der Südsee – à jour gefaßt, Berlin: Hermann Paetel, 1895; Berlin: Hermann Paetel, 1900 (Unterhaltungsschriften für die deutsche Jugend, 1). New edition: Samoa, die Perle der Südsee. Düsseldorf: Lilienfeld Verlag, 2008, with an afterword by Hermann Joseph Hiery, ISBN 978-3-940357-04-5
- Im Osten Asiens, Berlin: Allgemeiner Verein für Deutsche Literatur, 1896
