= Theodore N. Kaufman =

American activist (1910–1986)

Theodore Newman Kaufman
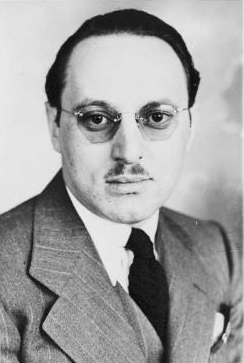
- Kaufman in 1941
- Born: Theodore Newman Kaufman; February 22, 1910; New York City, New York, U.S.
- Died: April 1, 1986 (aged 76); East Orange, New Jersey, U.S.
- Other name: Theodore Nathan Kaufmann
- Occupations: Businessman and writer
- Known for: Germany Must Perish!
- Parent: Anton Kaufman

Theodore Newman Kaufman (February 22, 1910 – April 1, 1986), sometimes given incorrectly as Theodore Nathan Kaufmann, was an American Jewish businessman and writer.

In 1939, he published pamphlets as "chairman of the American Federation of Peace" that argued that Americans should be sterilized so that their children will no longer have to fight in foreign wars.

In 1941, he wrote and published Germany Must Perish! which called for the sterilization of the German people and the redistribution of the German lands. The text was criticised for its extremism and generated limited attention in the United States. It was mostly used in Nazi propaganda, using it as proof that Jews were plotting for the genocide of the German people.

== Early life ==
He was born in Manhattan, on February 22, 1910, to Anton Kaufman and Fannie Newman. He was born to a Jewish family. His parents had married on March 14, 1909. His father had been a reporter for the Berliner Morgen-Zeitung in Berlin before emigrating to the United States in 1905. Theodore's three brothers were Herbert, Julian, and Leonard.

He attended South Side High School in Newark, New Jersey, and graduated around 1928.

In 1934, he was arrested along with his blind father, Anton Kaufman, for the robbery of Sandor Alexander Balint of Budapest. Balint had developed a process to increase the aging of wine. The Kaufmans had purchased this formula from Balint, but later came to believe that the formula was "worthless". Theodore Kaufman's mother died in 1939.

Kaufman traveled to the Sahara Desert and wrote: "you look at the horizon all day long and feel that you are staring at eternity." In Biskra he met Clare Sheridan.

Kaufman became the owner of a small advertising agency and ticket agency in South Orange, New Jersey. He published the New Jersey Legal Record. Kaufman founded the Argyle Press of Newark, New Jersey to publish his political pamphlets.

== Life during World War II ==
Kaufman was a radical intent on preventing American involvement in future wars in Europe. In 1939, under the auspices of the "American Federation of Peace", an unknown entity of which he was the president and probably only member, Kaufman produced several publications. One pamphlet, titled "Passive Purchase" advocated the establishment of a two-week period during which Americans would curtail their spending in order to demonstrate public opposition to American intervention in European conflicts. In a section of the pamphlet on the American Federation of Peace's beliefs, Kaufman advocated for "the strongest possible military defense of the United States" and stated that "by keeping absolutely aloof from foreign wars and entanglements the American People face a truly great future." That same year, the group also issued publications with more contentious messages, one of which read:

A possible plea to Congress. ... Have Us All Sterilized! ... If You Plan On Sending Us To A Foreign War ... Spare Us Any Possibility Of Ever Bringing Children Into This World — Into This Country Of Ours!

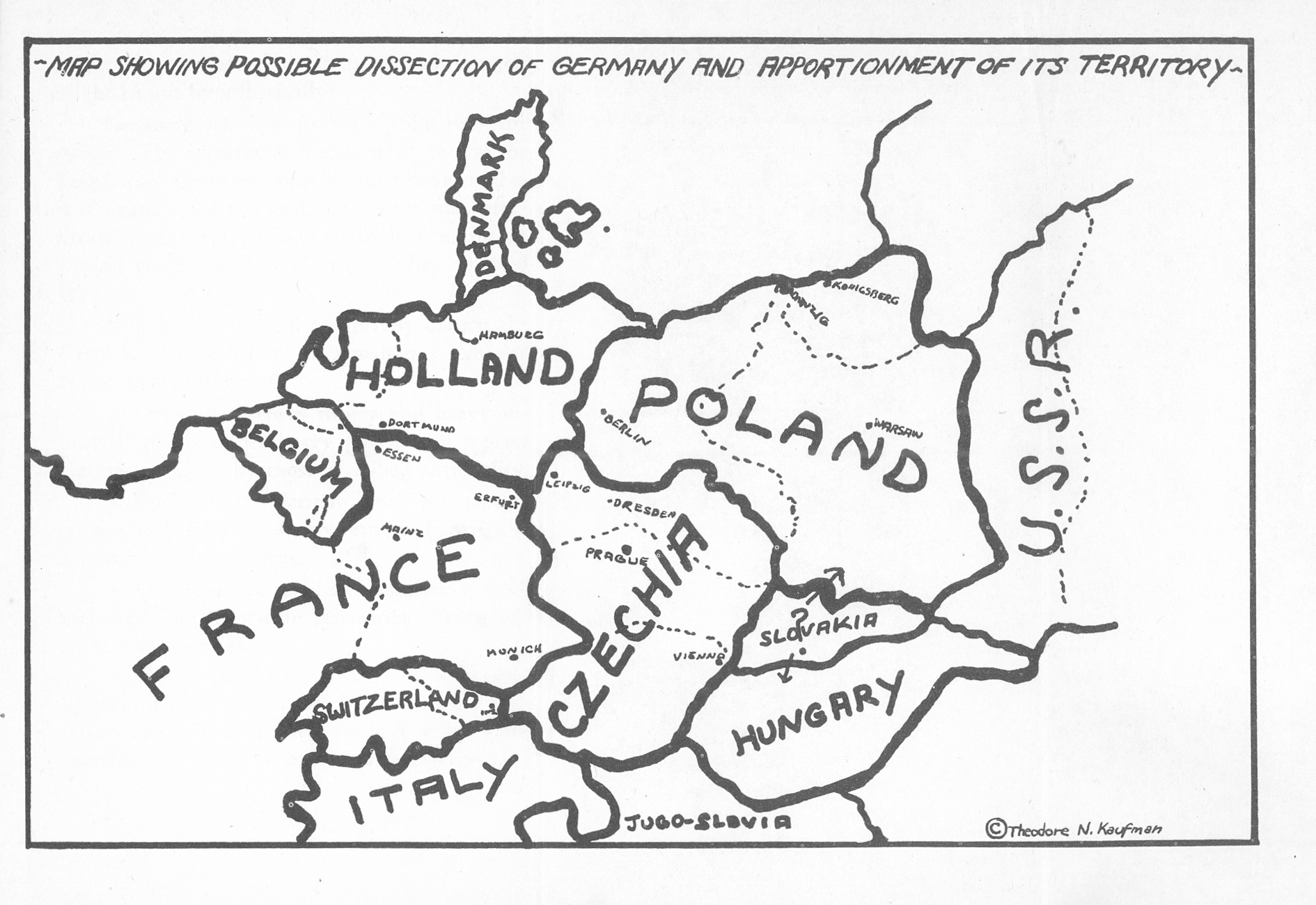
Map showing Kaufman's proposed dismemberment of Germany (and Austria).

Two years later he shifted his focus to the forced mass-sterilization of all German men under 65 and the sterilization of most German women under 45. This would eliminate "inbred Germanism," he proposed, thus solving a great deal of humanity's problems. He also promoted the distribution of Germany's lands among the neighboring countries. His effort was spearheaded by the self-publication of the book Germany Must Perish! Kaufman being a businessman with no established presence in intellectual circles, the book was mostly dismissed by American intellectuals and policymakers.

"Since Germans are the perennial disturbers of the world's peace ... they must be dealt with like any homicidal criminals. But it is unnecessary to put the whole German nation to the sword. It is more humane to sterilize them. The army groups, as organized units, would be the easiest and quickest to deal with. ... The population of Germany, excluding conquered and annexed territories, is about 70,000,000, almost equally divided between male and female. To achieve the purpose of German extinction it would be necessary to only sterilize some 48,000,000 -- a figure which excludes, because of their limited power to procreate, males over 60 years of age, and females over 45. ... Taking 20,000 surgeons as an arbitrary number and on the assumption that each will perform a minimum of 25 operations daily, it would take no more than one month, at the maximum, to complete their sterilization. ... The balance of the male civilian population of Germany could be treated within three months. Inasmuch as sterilization of women needs somewhat more time, it may be computed that the entire female population of Germany could be sterilized within a period of three years or less. Complete sterilization of both sexes, and not only one, is to be considered necessary in view of the present German doctrine that so much as one drop of true German blood constitutes a German. Of course, after complete sterilization, there will cease to be a birth rate in Germany. At the normal death rate of 2 per cent per annum, German life will diminish at the rate of 1,500,000 yearly. Accordingly in the span of two generations that which cost millions of lives and centuries of useless effort, namely, the elimination of Germanism and its carriers, will have been an accomplished fact. By virtue of its loss of self-perpetuation German Will will have atrophied and German power reduced to negligible importance."

Although Kaufman's book had a minimal impact in the United States, it gained attention in Nazi Germany, where propagandists used it as evidence of an international Jewish plan to destroy the German people. On July 24, 1941, the Nazi Party's newspaper, Völkischer Beobachter, published a front-page article on the book titled: "The Product of Criminal Jewish Sadism: Roosevelt Demands the Sterilization of the German People." The newspaper alleged that Kaufman was a close ally of Samuel Irving Rosenman, an advisor to Franklin Delano Roosevelt and that: "Given the close relationship of the writer to the White House, this monstrous war program can be seen as a synthesis of genuine Talmudic hatred and Roosevelt's views on foreign policy." At the time, the German leadership was engaged in a propaganda campaign designed to rally popular support for the German invasion of the Soviet Union. Antisemitism in general, and Kaufman's ideas in particular, became a focus of this campaign.

Nazi Propaganda Minister Joseph Goebbels read the book in early August and immediately grasped its value, writing in his diary: "This Jew did a real service for the enemy [German] side. Had he written this book for us, he could not have made it any better." Under Goebbels' direction, Germany Must Perish! continued to receive significant media attention in Germany. Portions of the book were read on national radio, and Goebbels ordered the printing of five million copies of a pamphlet that summarized Kaufman's ideas.

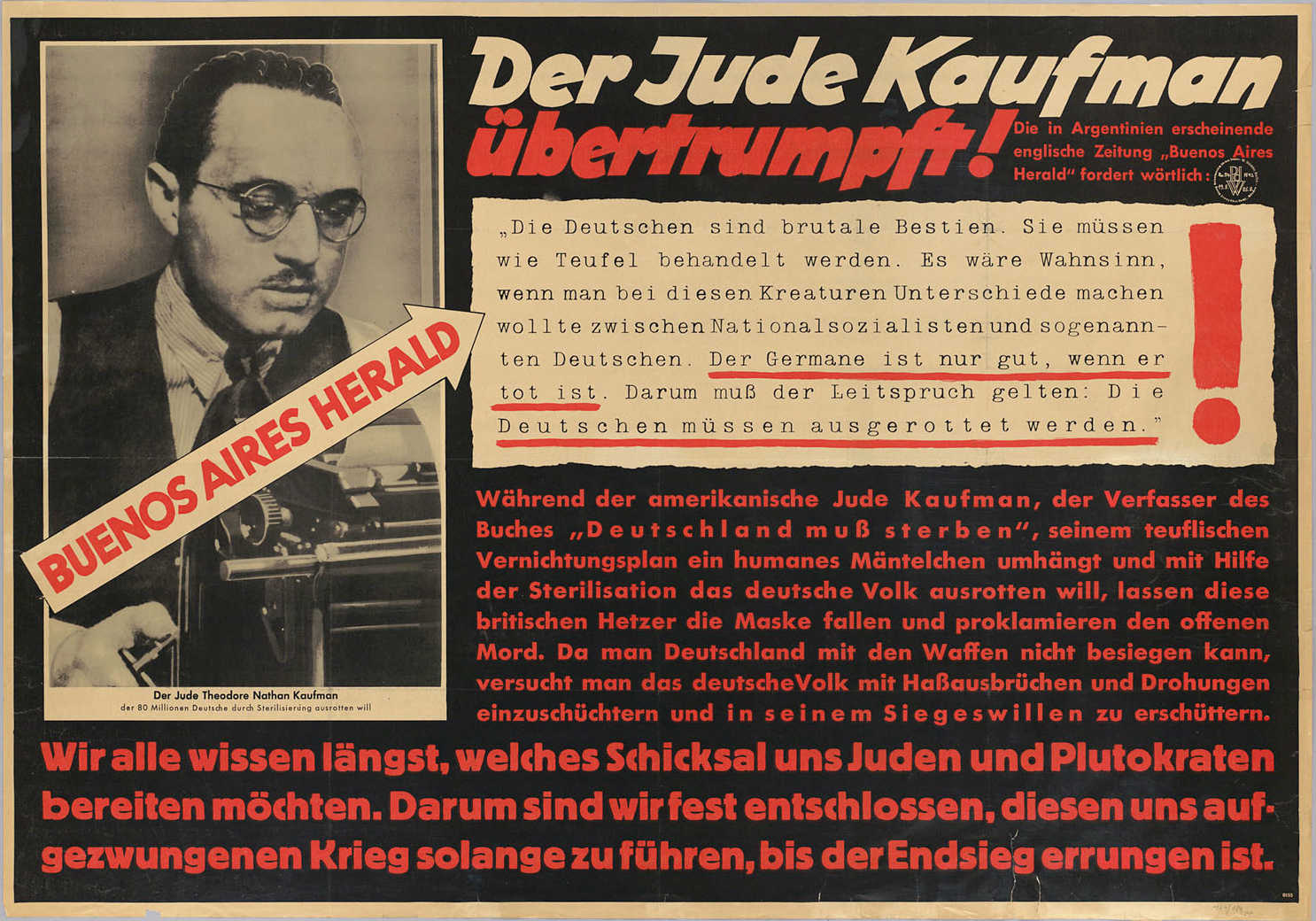
19 August 1942 edition of Parole der Woche condemning Kaufman

Nazi propaganda often used Kaufman's pamphlet as a justification for the persecution of Jews. When the Nazis required German Jews to wear a yellow badge on their clothing on September 1, 1941, they published a flyer explaining to the German people that those individuals wearing the star were conspiring to implement Kaufman's plan for the destruction of Germany. When the Jews of Hanover were forced from their homes on September 8, 1941, German authorities cited Kaufman's book as one of the reasons. Kaufman responded by saying:

This is just a flimsy pretext for another of the innate cruelties of the German people ... I don't think it was my book that prompted this barbarity. They employed every possible German cruelty against the Jews long before my book was published.

The Nazi propaganda ministry continued to publish pamphlets, posters and flyers on Kaufman's ideas through the end of the war, and also urged newspapers and public speakers to remind Germans of Kaufman's book. Kaufman's last major appearance in Nazi propaganda occurred in late 1944, when a five-page section on him was included in the widely published booklet Never!, which described a number of alleged plots to destroy Germany. Randall Bytwerk, a historian of communications at Calvin College, concluded that "[a] German at the time could not have missed encountering" propaganda about Kaufman.

His final publication through Argyle Press was the March 1942 brochure titled "No More German Wars! Being an outline for their permanent cessation". It contained no more writing on the sterilization of Germans or discussion of German land distribution, but made very moderate proposals for democratic re-education of the German population.

He enlisted in the US Army in New Mexico on April 24, 1942. During this time he was also placed at Camp Ritchie because of his linguistic abilities, thus making him one of many Ritchie Boys. His three brothers also served.

Few Americans have ever heard of a prominent fellow-citizen named Kaufmann ... In Germany every child has known of him for a long time. Germans are so well informed about Mr. Kaufmann that the mere mention of his name recalls what he stands for. In one of his recent articles Dr. Goebbels wrote, "Thanks to the Jew Kaufmann, we Germans know only too well what to expect in case of defeat."

— The Nation, November 14, 1942

Kaufman married the former Jean Siris in a civil ceremony on November 23, 1942, in Harris County, Texas.

== Post-war years and death ==
After World War II, Kaufman disappeared entirely from public life. Berel Lang, a visiting professor of philosophy and letters at Wesleyan University, failed to locate Kaufman in the records of the city of Newark and in other sources.

Kaufman and his wife appear in the Montclair, New Jersey Directory in 1947. He is listed as being in the painted textile business at 50 Church Street, Montclair. From 1949 through 1981, the Kaufmans sold "Charcrust Broil-It" barbecue seasoning powder from their home in East Orange, NJ.

He died in April 1986 in East Orange, New Jersey.

== Writings ==
- "Life, Liberty, Pursuit of Happiness - Where? In the Graves of European Battle Fields?" Newark, NJ: American Federation of Peace (c. 1938–1942)
- A Will and Way to Peace: Passive Purchase. Newark, NJ: American Federation of Peace (1939). 10-page pamphlet.
- Germany Must Perish! Newark, NJ: Argyle Press (1941). 104-page brochure.
- No More German Wars! Being An Outline For Their Permanent Cessation. Newark, NJ: Argyle Press (1942). 16-page brochure.

== See also ==
- Herschel Grynszpan, used as the excuse for Kristallnacht
- Noel Ignatiev
