= Tempo (newspaper) =

German periodical of the Weimar Republic

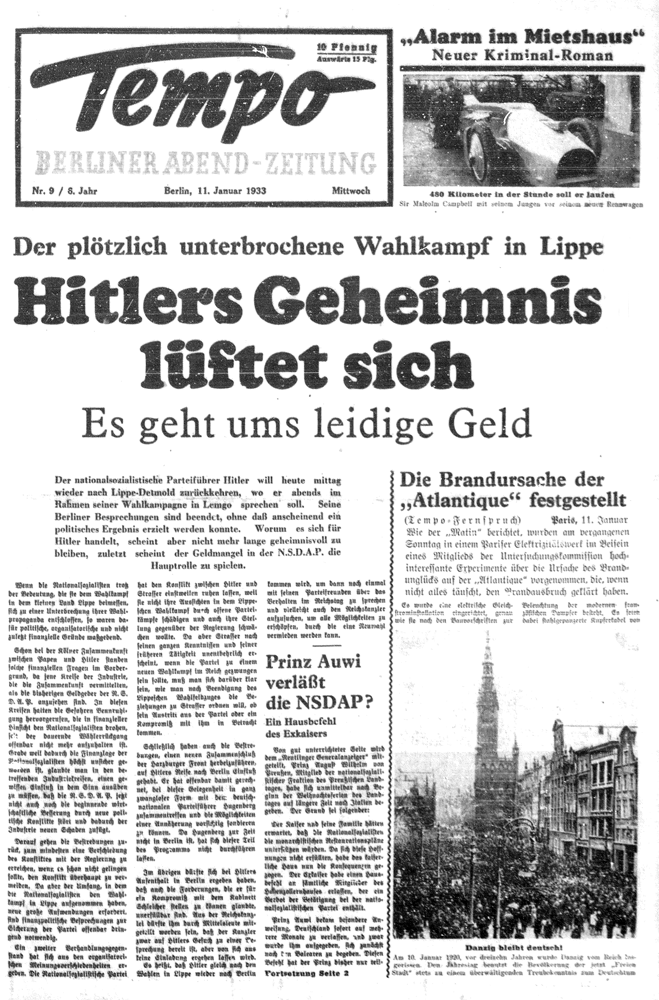
- Front page of Tempo, 11 January 1933
- Type: Daily newspaper
- Format: Berliner (format)
- Publisher: Ullstein Verlag
- Editor-in-chief: Gustav Kauder
- Managing editor: Manfred George
- Founded: 11 September 1928
- Ceased publication: 5 August 1933
- Political alignment: liberal
- Language: German
- Headquarters: Berlin, Germany
- City: Berlin
- Country: Germany
- Circulation: 145,450 (in 1930)

Tempo was a daily newspaper published in Germany between 1928 and 1933, with Berlin as its main area of distribution.

== History ==
In 1928, the Ullstein Verlag, Germany's biggest publishing house at the time, created Tempo as an afternoon paper published between 4pm and 7pm. The first issue appeared on 11 September 1928. According to the Ullstein Verlag, Tempo represented the "most modern type of newspaper in Germany" in terms of design, layout and reporting. It appeared in Berliner (format) and was printed on pinkish paper. In the beginning, the paper was published in three different daily editions, with a new one published every hour in order to be able to report on breaking news and developing events. This practice was gradually phased out, however, and from 1930 Tempo appeared in only one edition. The paper's reporting often focused on sensational news, such as murders and accidents, and its entertainment section gave much room to the film industry, including Hollywood celebrities. However, in its politics section, it also took a lively part in the Weimar Republic's increasingly volatile political culture. The paper's political line was left-liberal, following the general direction of the Ullstein Verlag, and Tempo frequently attacked political enemies, such as the Communist Party of Germany and, later on, the Nazi Party. The paper was itself the target of sustained attacks by these groups, which often condemned Tempo as a symbol of the Weimar Republic's supposedly decadent metropolitan culture. In 1930, the Ministry of the Reichswehr filed a lawsuit for treason against Tempo’s editor-in-chief, Gustav Kauder, for publishing a report about a secret cooperation between the Reichswehr and the Soviet Red Army. Despite its high profile and sensational nature, Tempo often struggled to attract readers, and its daily circulation mostly remained under 150,000 copies. It was discontinued on 5 August 1933, as the first Ullstein paper after the Nazi Machtergreifung.

== Readership ==
Tempo was conceived as a publication for the younger post-war generation, particularly women and white-collar workers, who had come of age under the new democratic order of the Weimar Republic. Ullstein believed that this generation needed a new type of newspaper that would do justice to their changed lifestyle and perspective with a different tone and a stronger focus on modern entertainment, sport and body culture.

== Notable editors and contributors ==
Manfred George oversaw the cultural section and acted as managing editor. Some of Weimar Germany's best-known writers regularly contributed to Tempo, from Kurt Tucholsky to Alexander Roda Roda and Erika Mann.

== Babylon Berlin ==
Tempo provided the inspiration for a newspaper of the same name that plays a central role in the third season of the TV series Babylon Berlin.
