= Aufbau =

Aufbau (German: [ˈaʊ̯fˌbaʊ̯]) is a term which was used in publications from 1919 to 1947 in the German language. The term can be translated as "structure", "construction" or as "rebuilding", "reconstruction". Peter Galison advocated its use as a "keyword", in the sense used by Raymond Williams in Keywords: A Vocabulary of Culture and Society.

== First period ==
The term was hardly used before 1919, and the use declined after 1947. The first peak occurred between 1919 and 1927, and the term was used to announce the emergence of a new structure from the chaos and disorder arising from the First World War and the defeat of the German Empire. The term was used to advocate a political, philosophical, and aesthetic world view. Peter Galison has described this use as a left technocratic period.

- Umsturz und Aufbau: a series of 8 pamphlets published by Ernst Rowohlt, Berlin, 1919-1920

- Friede den Hütten! Krieg den Palästen by Georg Büchner;
- Der politische Dichter by Walter Hasenclever;
- Kampf gegen die Waffe! by Rudolf Leonhard;
- Zur Judenfrage by Karl Marx;
- Der Hochverräter Ernst Toller by Stefan Grossmann;
- Reißt die Kreuze aus der Erden by Georg Herwegh;
- Ewig im Aufruhr by Johannes R. Becher;
- Der Pariser Frieden und die Jugend Europas by George D. Herron

- Der Aufbau: Sozialistische Wochenzeitung: Zurich based socialist weekly newspaper, launched on 4 December 1919
- Der Aufbau: Flugblätter an Jugend, ten pamphlets published by Hermann Schüller.
- Der logische Aufbau der Welt (The Logical Structure of the World) by Rudolph Carnap. This was submitted as a habilitation thesis in 1926 and published in 1928.

== Second period ==
The second period is between 1934 and 1937 when the publications come from both right and left. For right, it concerned an organicist approach to developing and empowering the state. For the antifascist, the term was used for organising the opposition to destruction already wrought and that envisaged by the dictatorship.

- Aufbau published by the German–Jewish Club, New York

== Third period ==
The third period is between 1945 and 1947. Here the term was used to promote liberal democracy to create a literature of cultural renovation following World War II, with a view to reintegrate Germany into the world community.

== See also ==
- Aufbauliteratur
