= Walter Laqueur =

American historian (1921–2018)

- Born: 26 May 1921; Breslau, Lower Silesia, Weimar Republic
- Died: 30 September 2018 (aged 97); Washington, D.C., U.S.
- Citizenship: United States
- Occupations: Historian; political commentator
- Awards: Guggenheim Memorial Foundation (1970); Inter Nationes (1984); Order of Merit of the Federal Republic of Germany (1985); Ph.D. h.c. mult.

Walter Ze'ev Laqueur (26 May 1921 – 30 September 2018) was a German-born American historian, journalist, political commentator, and Holocaust survivor. He was an influential scholar on the subjects of terrorism and political violence.

== Biography ==
Walter Laqueur was born in Breslau, Lower Silesia, Germany (today Wrocław, Poland), into a Jewish family. In November 1938 he left Germany, immigrating to Mandatory Palestine. His parents, who were unable to leave, were murdered in the Holocaust. After less than a year at the Hebrew University of Jerusalem, he left to work as an agricultural laborer and guard. In 1942 he became a member of kibbutz HaZore'a. He spoke several languages.

Laqueur was married to Naomi Koch, with whom he had two daughters. His second wife was Christa Susi Genzen. Laqueur died at his home in Washington, D.C., on September 30, 2018.

== Journalism and academic career ==
From 1944, when he moved to Jerusalem, until his departure in 1955 he worked as a journalist for the Hashomer Hatzair newspaper, Mishmar (later, Al HaMishmar), and for The Palestine Post (later, The Jerusalem Post). In addition, he was the Middle East correspondent for journals in the United States and a commentator on world politics for Israel radio.

After moving to London, Laqueur founded and edited Soviet Survey, a journal focusing on Soviet and East European culture. Survey was one of the numerous publications of the CIA-funded Congress for Cultural Freedom to counter Soviet Communist cultural propaganda in the West.

Laqueur was Director of the Institute of Contemporary History and the Wiener Library in London from 1965 to 1994. Together with George Mosse, he founded and edited Journal of Contemporary History. From 1969 he was a member, and later Chairman (until 2000), of the International Research Council of the Center for Strategic and International Studies, Washington. He was the founding editor of The Washington Papers. He was Professor of the History of Ideas at Brandeis University from 1968 to 1972, and at Georgetown University from 1976 to 1988. He was also a visiting professor of history and government at Harvard, the University of Chicago, Tel Aviv University and Johns Hopkins University.

Laqueur wrote extensively about the Middle East, the Arab-Israeli conflict, the German Youth Movement, Zionism, the cultural history of the Weimar Republic, Communism and the Soviet Union, the Holocaust, the Cold War, fascism, post-World War II Europe and the decline of Europe, antisemitism both ancient and new. He pioneered the study of guerrilla warfare and terrorism. After the fall of the Soviet Union, he predicted that Russia would not become a democracy but an authoritarian system based on nationalist populism. His books and articles, which were published in many American and Europeans newspapers and periodicals, have been translated into several languages.

Laqueur's book The Last Days of Europe is often cited as a segment of "Eurabia literature", although in After the Fall he dismisses the "alarmist" notion of Eurabia as popularized by Oriana Fallaci.

== Political views ==
The New York Times described Laqueur as difficult to "pigeonhole politically." He supported Israel but criticized its expansion of settlements in the West Bank.

== Selected works ==
Articles

- "Letters from Readers." Commentary, vol. 21, no. 2 (February 1956), pp. 183–185.
- "Communism and Nationalism in Tropical Africa." Foreign Affairs, vol. 39, no. 4 (July 1961), pp. 610–621. JSTOR 20029515.
- "Hollanditis: A New Stage in European Neutralism." Commentary (August 1981), pp. 19–29.
- "The Future of Intelligence." Society, vol. 35, no. 2 (January/February 1998), pp. 301–311. doi:10.1007/BF02838154.
- "Disraelia: A Counterfactual History, 1848-2008." Middle East Papers, no. 1 (April 1, 2008).

Books

- Communism and Nationalism in the Middle East, London: Routledge & Kegan Paul 1956
- Nasser's Egypt, London: Weidenfeld & Nicolson, 1957
- The Soviet Cultural Scene, 1956–1957, co-edited with George Lichtheim, New York: Praeger, 1958
- The Middle East in Transition: Studies in Contemporary History, New York: Praeger, 1958.
- The Soviet Union and the Middle East. New York: Frederick A. Praeger, 1959. LCCN 59-7304.
- Polycentrism: The New Factor in International Communism, co-edited with Leopold Labedz, New York: Praeger, 1962
- Young Germany: A History of the German Youth Movement, New York: Basic Books, 1962
- Heimkehr: Reisen in der Vergangenheit, Berlin, Propylaen Verlag, 1964
- Neue Welle in der Sowjetunion: Beharrung und Fortschritt in Literatur und Kunst, Vienna: Europa Verlag, 1964
- Russia and Germany: A Century of Conflict, London: Weidenfeld & Nicolson, 1965
- 1914: The Coming of the First World War, co-edited with George L. Mosse, New York: Harper & Row, 1966
- Education and Social Structure in the Twentieth Century, co-edited with George L. Mosse, New York: Harper & Row, 1967
- The Fate of the Revolution: Interpretations of Soviet History, London: Weidenfeld & Nicolson, 1967
- The Road to Jerusalem: The Origins of the Arab-Israeli Conflict, 1967, New York: Macmillan, 1968 (published in the UK as The Road to War, 1967: The Origins of the Arab-Israel Conflict, London: Weidenfeld & Nicolson, 1969)
- The Israel-Arab Reader: A Documentary History of the Middle East Conflict, Pelican Books, 1969.
- Linksintellektuelle zwischen den beiden Weltkriegen, co-written with George Mosse, Munich: Nymphenburger Verlagshandlung, 1969
- The Struggle for the Middle East: The Soviet Union in the Mediterranean, 1958–1968, London: Routledge & Kegan Paul, 1969
- Europe Since Hitler, London: Weidenfeld & Nicolson, 1970
- A Dictionary of Politics, London: Weidenfeld & Nicolson, 1971 ISBN 0-297-00091-8
- Out of the Ruins of Europe, New York: Library Press, 1971 ISBN 0-912050-01-2
- A Reader's Guide to Contemporary History, co-edited with Bernard Krikler, London: Weidenfeld & Nicolson, 1972 ISBN 0-297-99465-4.
- A History of Zionism, London: Weidenfeld & Nicolson 1972 ISBN 0-03-091614-3
- Neo-Isolationism and the World of the Seventies, New York: Library Press, 1972 ISBN 0-912050-38-1
- Confrontation: The Middle East War and World Politics', London: Wildwood House, 1974 ISBN 0-7045-0096-5
- Historians in Politics, co-edited with George L. Mosse, London: Sage Publications, 1974 ISBN 0-8039-9930-5
- Weimar: A Cultural History, 1918–1933. London: Weidenfeld & Nicolson, 1974. ISBN 0297765744.
- Fascism: A Reader's Guide: Analyses, Interpretations, Bibliography (editor). Berkeley: University of California Press, 1976. ISBN 0520030338.
- Terrorism, Boston, MA: Little, Brown, 1977 ISBN 0-316-51470-5
- Guerrilla: A Historical and Critical Study, London: Weidenfeld & Nicolson, 1977 ISBN 0-297-77184-1
- The Guerrilla Reader: A Historical Anthology, editor, Philadelphia: Temple University Press, 1977 ISBN 0-87722-095-6
- The Terrorism Reader: A Historical Anthology, editor, Philadelphia: Temple University Press, 1978 ISBN 0-87722-119-7
- The Human Rights Reader, co-edited with Barry Rubin, Philadelphia: Temple University Press, 1979 ISBN 0-87722-170-7
- A Continent Astray: Europe, 1970–1978, London and New York: Oxford University Press, 1979 ISBN 0-19-502510-5
- The Missing Years [a novel], London: Weidenfeld & Nicolson, 1980 ISBN 0 297 77707 6
- Farewell to Europe [a novel], London: Weidenfeld & Nicolson,1981 ISBN 0 297 77870 6
- The Terrible Secret: Suppression of the Truth about Hitler's Final Solution, Boston, MA: Little, Brown, 1980 ISBN 0-316-51474-8
- The Political Psychology of Appeasement: Finlandization and Other Unpopular Essays, New Brunswick, NJ: Transaction Books, 1980. ISBN 0-87855-336-3
- The Second World War: Essays in Military and Political History, London: Sage Publications, 1982 ISBN 0-8039-9780-9
- America, Europe, and the Soviet Union: Selected Essays, New Brunswick, NJ: Transaction Books, 1983 ISBN 0-87855-362-2
- The Pattern of Soviet Conduct in the Third World, editor, New York: Praeger, 1983 ISBN 0-03-063944-1
- Looking Forward, Looking Back: A Decade of World Politics, New York: Praeger, 1983 ISBN 0-03-063422-9
- The Israel-Arab Reader: A Documentary History of the Middle East Conflict, co-edited with Barry Rubin, London and New York: Penguin Books, 1984 ISBN 0-14-022588-9
- Germany Today: A Personal Report, Boston, MA: Little, Brown, 1985 ISBN 0-316-51453-5
- A World of Secrets: The Uses and Limits of Intelligence, New York: Basic Books, 1985 ISBN 0-465-09237-3
- European Peace Movements and the Future of the Western Alliance, co-edited with Robert Hunter, New Brunswick, NJ: Transaction Books, 1985 ISBN 0-88738-035-2
- Breaking The Silence, co-written with Richard Breitman, New York: Simon & Schuster, 1986 ISBN 0-671-54694-5
- The Fate of the Revolution: Interpretations of Soviet History from 1917 to the Present, New York: Scribner's, 1987 ISBN 0-684-18903-8
- America in the World, 1962–1987: A Strategic and Political Reader, co-edited with Brad Roberts, New York: St. Martin's Press, 1987 ISBN 0-312-01318-3
- The Age of Terrorism, Boston, MA: Little, Brown, 1987 ISBN 0-316-51478-0
- The Long Road to Freedom: Russia and Glasnost, Collier Books, 1989, ISBN 0-02-034090-7
- Soviet Realities: Culture and Politics from Stalin to Gorbachev, New Brunswick, NJ: Transaction Books, 1990 ISBN 0-88738-302-5
- Stalin: The Glasnost Revelations, New York : Scribner's, 1990 ISBN 0-684-19203-9
- Soviet Union 2000: Reform or Revolution?, co-written with John Erickson, New York: St. Martin's Press, 1990 ISBN 0-312-04425-9
- Thursday's Child Has Far to Go: A Memoir of the Journeying Years, New York: Scribner's, 1992 ISBN 0-684-19421-X
- Europe in Our Time: A History, 1945–1992, New York: Viking, 1992 ISBN 0-670-83507-2
- Black Hundred: The Rise of the Extreme Right in Russia, New York : Harper Collins, 1993 ISBN 0-06-018336-5
- The Dream That Failed: Reflections on the Soviet Union, London and New York: Oxford University Press, 1994 ISBN 0-19-508978-2
- Fascism: Past, Present, Future. London and New York: Oxford University Press, 1996. ISBN 0195092457 / ISBN 978-0195092455.
- Fin de Siècle and Other Essays on America & Europe, New Brunswick, NJ, and London: Transaction Publishers, 1997 ISBN 1-56000-261-1
- Guerrilla Warfare: A Historical and Critical Study, New Brunswick, NJ, and London: Transaction Publishers, 1997 ISBN 0-7658-0406-9
- Origins of Terrorism: Psychologies, Ideologies, Theologies, States of Mind, Woodrow Wilson Center Press, 1998 ISBN 0-943875-89-7
- The New Terrorism: Fanaticism and the Arms of Mass Destruction, London and New York: Oxford University Press, 1999 ISBN 0-19-511816-2
- Generation Exodus: The Fate of Young Jewish Refugees From Nazi Germany. Hanover, NH; London: University Press of New England for Brandeis University Press, 2001. The Tauber Institute for the Study of European Jewry Series. ISBN 1584651067.
- The Holocaust Encyclopedia, with Judith Tydor Baumel. New Haven, CT: Yale University Press, 2001. ISBN 0300084323.
- A History of Terrorism. New Brunswick, NJ: Transaction Publishers, 2001. ISBN 0765807998.
- Voices of Terror: Manifestos, Writings and Manuals of Al Qaeda, Hamas, and Other Terrorists from Around the World and Throughout the Ages. Naperville, Illinois: Sourcebooks, Inc., 2004. ISBN 1594290350.
- No End to War: Terrorism in the Twenty-first Century. Continuum International Publishing Group, 2004.
- Dying for Jerusalem: The Past, Present and Future of the Holiest City. Naperville, Illinois: Sourcebooks, Inc., 2006. ISBN 1402206321 / ISBN 978-1402206320.
- The Changing Face of Antisemitism: From Ancient Times to the Present Day, London and New York: Oxford University Press, 2006 ISBN 0-19-530429-2
- The Last Days of Europe: Epitaph for an Old Continent. New York: Thomas Dunne Books, 2007. ISBN 0312368704 / ISBN 978-0312368708.
- Best of Times, Worst of Times: Memoirs of a Political Education. Lebanon, NH: Brandeis University Press, 2009. The Tauber Institute for the Study of European Jewry Series. ISBN 978-1584657989.
- A History of Zionism: From the French Revolution to the Establishment of the State of Israel ISBN 978-0307530851
- After the Fall: The End of the European Dream and the Decline of a Continent. New York: Macmillan, 2011. ISBN 978-1250000088.
- Harvest of a Decade: Disraelia and Other Essays. Piscataway, New Jersey: Transaction Publishers, 2012. ISBN 978-1412842327.
- Optimism in Politics: Reflections on Contemporary History. Piscataway, New Jersey: Transaction Publishers, 2014. ISBN 978-1412852661.
- Putinism: Russia and its Future with the West. New York: Thomas Dunne Books, 2015.
- The Israel-Arab Reader: A Documentary History of the Middle East Conflict, with Dan Schueftan. London and New York: Penguin Books, 2016. Eighth revised and updated edition.
- The Future of Terrorism: ISIS, Al-Qaeda, and the Alt-Right, with Christopher Wall. New York: Thomas Dunne Books, 2018. Audiobook available.

Hearings/Testimony

- Negotiation and Statecraft. Hearings before the Permanent Subcommittee on Investigations of the Committee of Government Operations, United States Senate. Washington: U.S. Government Printing Office, 1973–1975.
