= Aufbau (journal) =

German-language Jewish newspaper and magazine

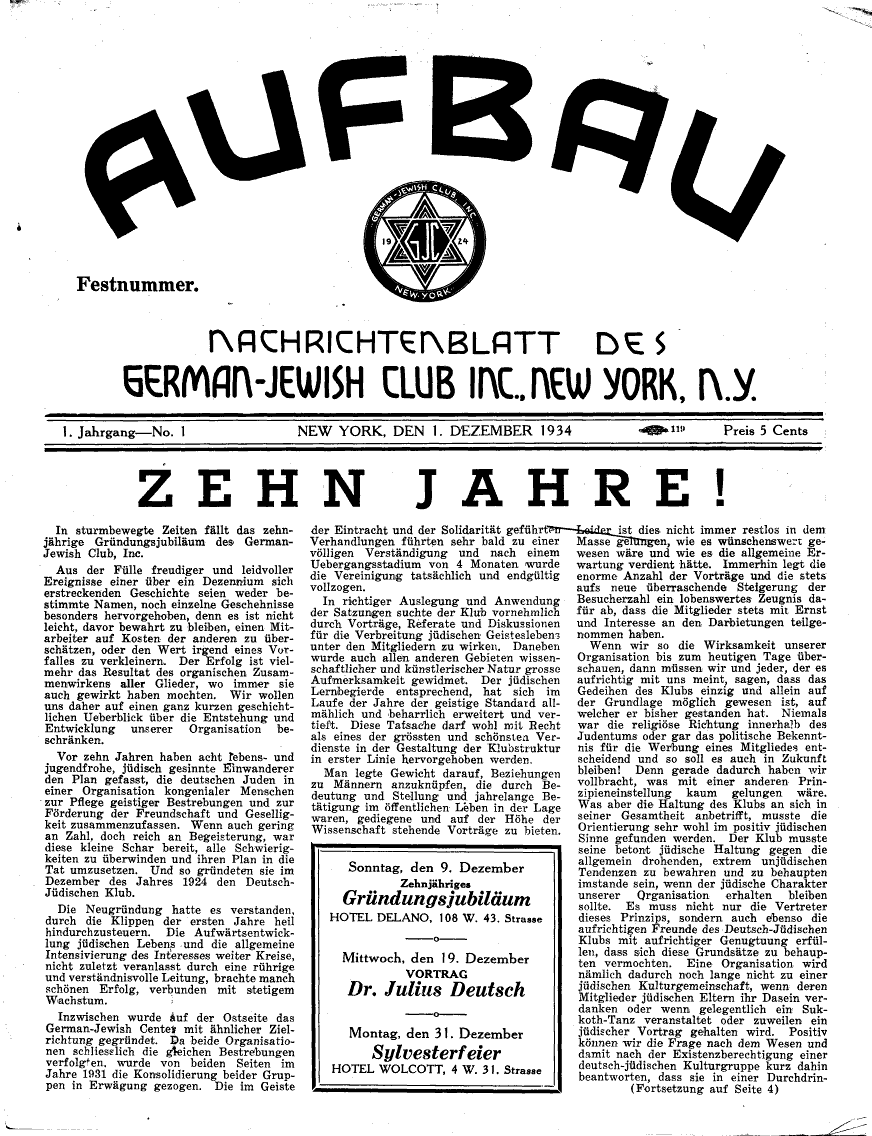
First issue of the journal

Aufbau (German for "building up, construction") is a periodical targeted at German-speaking Jews around the globe. Founded in 1934 in New York City as a newspaper for German Jewish immigrants, it was reinvented in 2004 in Switzerland as a glossy magazine for German-speaking Jews of the 21st century. Hannah Arendt, Albert Einstein, Thomas Mann, and Stefan Zweig wrote for the original publication. Until 2004 it was published in New York City. It is now published in Zurich.

== History ==
Aufbau was founded by the German–Jewish Club, which was later renamed the New World Club. The original purpose of the journal was as a monthly newsletter for the club, which included information and helpful facts for Jewish refugees.

== Early years ==
=== 1934 ===
In December, the first issue of the journal was published.

=== 1935 ===
In February 1935, the Aufbau released its third publication that highlighted the Heinrich Heine, later renamed the Lorelei, Foundation in New York City, New York. Later that year in June, the Aufbau released an issue detailing pro-Nazi groups as a warning for readers in Yorkville. The passing of the Nuremberg Laws prompted the Aufbau to respond by continuing to publish their content. In November, the focus of the Aufbau changed. The focus of the journal shifted from primarily being about the club and community promotion, to depicting more of what was happening to Jewish people in German cities. The November issue was the beginning of the Aufbau's evolution and expansion to not only New York Jewish communities, but Jewish communities everywhere.

=== 1938 ===
In November 1938, the primary mission for the Aufbau continued to evolve. This particular evolution in their mission was in response to Hitler gaining control of the Sudetenland in Czechoslovakia. The Aufbau then began to strive for a greater sense of unity amongst the Jewish communities around the world by beginning to report on what the situations were like for those still in Europe as opposed to those who had immigrated to the United States.

=== 1939 ===
In February 1939, the Aufbau went through another transition. The general tone of the paper changed their design to focus more on the realities faced by the Jewish communities in Europe. For example, a particular issue highlighted the story of how an SS officer beat, humiliated, and tortured a group of German Jewish people as well as other acts against German Jewish people in similar situations. This report was specific only to Aufbau because it did not meet American journalist standards because the source of the stories was anonymous. August marked the beginning of a new featured segment in Aufbau, titled "March of Time". This addition to the paper served the purpose of creating a convenient list of news sources for Jewish communities.

Manfred George was nominated as the new editor in 1939.

==== Manfred George ====
The purpose of the publication changed markedly when, in 1939, Manfred George was nominated as the new editor. George took the journal from a monthly newsletter to one of the leading anti-Nazi publications of the German press in exile. George, within the first five years of his tenure, took the circulation of the journal from 8,000 to 40,000. Before Manfred George became the editor of the Aufbau, he was a well-known editor of a Berlin daily, Tempo, and a left-wing journalist in the Weimar Republic

When George became the new editor, he added three major themes for the Aufbau, emphasizing the connection between the German homeland and the newfound homeland of the United States; encouraging a strong belief in Judaism; and loyalty to the German culture.

In one of the first issues with George as editor, he highlighted the uncertainty present in the futures of Jewish people at the time and encouraged sympathy and neutrality. This issue was released shortly after Germany invaded Poland in September 1939.

=== 1940 ===
In 1940, Aufbau faced backlash because they were reporting the violence and incidents occurring against Jewish people in Europe. The backlash revolved around people not approving of their content nor finding it to be credible. The Aufbau editors responded by issuing a statement explaining that other publication's readers did not necessarily care as much about the suffering of Jewish people as the Aufbau readers did. Furthermore, editors explained that what the competing publications, like the New York Times, were currently publishing, the Aufbau had published weeks prior.

As of February 1940, the Aufbau was continuing to promote club events for the German-Jewish Club. In addition, throughout the summer, the journal highlighted various happenings and occurrences in American politics under the heading, "The Smoke-Filled Room". The purpose of this was to educate Jewish immigrants in the United States on mainstream American culture and practices, like the presidential election between Franklin D, Roosevelt and Wendell Willkie.

=== 1941 ===
In an effort to continue the support for Americanization, the Aufbau published an Aufbau Almanac, called "The Immigrants Handbook". This handbook was used as a how-to guide for new German-Jewish immigrants within the United States. It included 192 pages detailing American life and everything that someone might need to know, like the political system or the lyrics to "The Star-Spangled Banner".

== Archives ==
From September 1, 1944, through September 27, 1946, the Aufbau printed numerous lists of Jewish Holocaust survivors located in Europe, as well as a few lists of victims. The data include information taken from lists which appeared between late 1944 and early 1947. The lists published in Aufbau were prepared by many different organizations, often by Jewish relief organizations or by officials in displaced persons' camps.

The Aufbau Indexing Project (AIP) is an online database of names that appeared in announcements published in the Aufbau.

The goal of the Aufbau Indexing Project is to index all the announcements of birth, engagement, marriage, death and other special occasions that appeared in the pages of Aufbau between 1934 and 2004. This project will allow individuals researching their German-Jewish ancestry to easily locate announcements relevant to their research. ... To date the AIP has indexed more than 27,000 announcements, mostly from the time period 1975–2002. These records are now available as a searchable database on this site. However, a great amount of work remains. In the peak years 1940–1960, there were two to three pages of announcements in each issue. This translates to more than 150,000 announcements over the course of Aufbau's 65+ years.

All archives, curated collections, and reproductions issued, from inception through 2004, are accessible online at the Leo Baeck Institute
