= Voices of Terror =

Book by Walter Laqueur

- Cover of the first edition
- Author: Walter Laqueur
- Language: English
- Subject: Terrorism
- Publisher: Reed Press
- Publication date: 2004
- Publication place: United States
- Media type: Print (paperback)
- Pages: 520
- ISBN: 1-59429-035-0
- OCLC: 55105719
- Dewey Decimal: 303.625
- LC Class: HV6431.V65 2004

Voices of Terror: Manifestos, Writings and Manuals of Al Qaeda, Hamas, and Other Terrorists from Around the World and Throughout the Ages is a book edited by scholar and historian Walter Laqueur. The book is a comprehensive anthology of 82 primary source documents related to terrorism. Each document is presented with a brief introduction and short explanatory text.

== Contents ==
The book is a comprehensive anthology of 82 primary source documents examining the morality, psychology, and ethics of ideological violence. Each document is presented with a brief introduction and short explanatory text. This book is designed as a reference for the more serious students of history and the use of terror.

The book is divided into three sections. The book documents the emotions, principles, and rhetoric used by those who espouse violence whether for tyranny, revolution, guerrilla warfare, and terrorism. Primary source documents are presented from figures such as Clausewitz, Lenin, Karl Marx, Emma Goldman, Mao Zedong, Che Guevara, and Menachem Begin, as well as English Puritan Edward Sexby and Greek satirist Lucian of Samosata.

The final section of the book includes 26 documents of contemporary Islamic terrorist leaders and groups such as Osama bin Laden, al-Qaeda and Hamas.

== Publication history ==
It was edited by Walter Laqueur, a scholar of geopolitics and history. Its first edition was 520 pages long, published in paperback form in 2004 in New York City by Reed Press. It was also published by Sourcebooks in a 400 page edition. The first two sections are largely made up of content from two of his earlier anthologies, but the third has 150 pages of new material in addition to notes. Much of the content in the book first appeared in English here.

== Reception ==
J. Peter Pham for The National Interest called its scope "immense", while Mark H. Beaudry for the journal Security Management called it "brilliantly presented and meticulously documented" and "probably the single best volume on terrorist writings". A reviewer for the journal Parameters called it comprehensive. Jeremy Moses for the Australian Journal of Political Science was critical, and criticized it for not giving a proper definition of terrorism, remarking that "one might think that a 520-page collection of writings on the subject would have to start with some kind of definition".
