= Journal of Contemporary History =

Quarterly peer-reviewed academic journal

- Discipline: History
- Language: English
- Edited by: Richard J. Evans; Mary C. Neuburger

Publication details
- History: 1966–present
- Publisher: SAGE Publications
- Frequency: Quarterly
- Impact factor: 0.769 (2018)

Standard abbreviations
- ISO 4: J. Contemp. Hist.

Indexing
- ISSN: 0022-0094 (print); 1461-7250 (web)
- LCCN: 66009877
- JSTOR: 00220094
- OCLC no.: 1783199

Links
- Journal homepage; Online access; Online archive

The Journal of Contemporary History is a quarterly peer-reviewed academic journal covering the study of history in all parts of the world since 1930. It was established in 1966 by Walter Laqueur and George L. Mosse. Originally published by Weidenfeld & Nicolson it was purchased by SAGE Publications in 1972. The editors-in-chief are Richard J. Evans (University of Cambridge) and Mary C. Neuburger (University of Texas at Austin).

== Content and scope ==
The journal publishes scholarly articles, review articles and book reviews, covering a broad range of historical approaches including social, economic, political, diplomatic, intellectual and cultural, on every country and region of the world within living memory, from 1930 to the present day. The journal also publishes special issues, arising from conferences or from an externally submitted proposal.

Since 2008, the journal has included reviews of individual books, in addition to review articles covering a range of books within the compass of a single critical essay.

== Abstracting and indexing ==
The journal is abstracted and indexed in Scopus and the Social Sciences Citation Index.

== Reception ==
The journal has been described as "an excellent international publication". The Times Literary Supplement has described it as "one of the outstanding learned journals of history in the English-speaking world."

According to the Journal Citation Reports, the journal has a 2018 impact factor of 0.769, ranking it 22nd out of 95 journals in the category "History".
