= Newark Jewish Chronicle =

Weekly newspaper published from 1921 to 1943

The Newark Jewish Chronicle was a daily newspaper published in Newark, New Jersey, by Anton Kaufman from 1921 to January 8, 1943. It was an English language weekly paper, which came out every Friday By 1942 it was the last remaining Jewish newspaper in Newark, New Jersey. It has been digitized by GenealogyBank.

== History ==
The newspaper was established in 1921. During World War II advertising revenue fell and Kaufman was forced to sell his cemetery plot to keep the paper going. Anton Kaufman took his own life on January 1, 1943, and the last issue was on January 8, 1943.
