= Werner E. Mosse =

British historian (1918–2001)

- Born: Werner Eugen Emil Mosse; 5 February 1918; Berlin, German Empire
- Died: 30 April 2001 (aged 83)

Academic background
- Education: University of Cambridge
- Doctoral advisor: Herbert Butterfield

Academic work
- Institutions: School of Slavonic and East European Studies; University of Glasgow; University of East Anglia
- Notable works: The Rise and Fall of the Crimean System, 1855–1871 (1963) *Alexander II and the Modernization of Russia (1958)

Werner Eugen Emil Mosse (5 February 1918 – 30 April 2001) was a German-born British historian specialising in 19th-century European diplomacy and German-Jewish economic history. Fleeing Nazi persecution as a Jewish refugee, he became a prominent scholar of Imperial Russia and the Crimean War. His scholarship is recognised for its critical analysis of Great power politics and international relations.

== Early life and education ==
Mosse was raised in a German-Jewish upper-middle-class family in Charlottenburg and Stangenhagen, near Berlin. His father was a wealthy newspaper owner, as was his great-uncle Rudolf Mosse. He and his two younger siblings were sent by their parents to safety in Great Britain in 1933; his father died the same year while on the way to a concentration camp, allegedly by suicide. Mosse attended St Paul's School and Corpus Christi College, Cambridge, where he was awarded a first-class degree in history in 1939. A contemporary at Cambridge was his second cousin, the future historian George L. Mosse (then known as Gerhard Lachmann-Mosse), who was a student at Downing College. Interned as a German citizen from 1940 to 1941, Mosse became a British citizen and served in the Royal Pioneer Corps of the British Army until 1946, ultimately reaching the rank of captain.

== Academic career ==
Following the war, Mosse was made a junior research fellow at Corpus Christi. From 1948 to 1952 he was a lecturer in modern Russian history at the School of Slavonic and East European Studies, and received his PhD at Cambridge in 1950 under Herbert Butterfield. Senior lecturer in East European history at the University of Glasgow from 1952 to 1964, he was subsequently Professor of European History at the University of East Anglia (UEA) in Norwich, making him one of its founding fathers. Mosse retired from UEA in 1983. He was a Fellow of the Royal Historical Society.

Mosse initially focused primarily on Russian and Soviet history, the comparative history of the European bourgeoisie in the 19th century, and the history of liberalism. Only later did he turn his attention to the history of German Jewry in the 19th and 20th centuries, particularly its economic elite, from which he himself came. For many years, he served as chairman of the advisory board of the Leo Baeck Institute in London and edited important anthologies on recent German-Jewish history.

In 2002, Barbara Mosse established a postgraduate scholarship (Werner Mosse awards) at the School of History at the University of East Anglia in memory of her brother.

== Research and major works ==
Mosse's scholarship focused on two areas: European diplomacy and German-Jewish economic history.

=== Diplomatic history ===
His seminal work, The Rise and Fall of the Crimean System, 1855–1871 (1963), analysed the collapse of the post-Crimean War settlement. Mosse highlighted the fragility of the Black Sea clauses, arguing that they were untenable due to Russia's resurgence and Great Power hypocrisy.

=== German-Jewish economic history ===
In later decades, Mosse shifted focus to German-Jewish entrepreneurship. His 1987 book Jews in the German Economy documented the outsized role of Jewish industrialists in pre-Nazi Germany, countering stereotypes of Jews as solely financiers.

=== Other works ===
- Alexander II and the Modernization of Russia (1958) examined reforms under Tsar Alexander II.
- The European Powers and the German Question, 1848–1871 (1958) explored diplomatic tensions before German unification.

== Reception and legacy ==
Mosse's work was praised for its archival rigour and interdisciplinary approach. Historian Geoffrey Hosking noted his "ability to bridge Russian and German historiography." His papers are archived at the University of East Anglia and the Leo Baeck Institute.

== Important publications ==
- The European Powers and the German Question 1848–1871, New York 1981 (zuerst 1958), ISBN 978-0-374-95928-9.
- Alexander II and the Modernization of Russia, 2nd, expanded edition, London 1992 (first published 1958), ISBN 978-1-85043-512-9 .
- The Rise and Fall of the Crimean System 1855–1871, London and New York 1963.
- (Ed.): Decisive Year 1932. On the Jewish Question in the Final Phase of the Weimar Republic. An anthology (= Series of Scientific Papers of the Leo Baeck Institute, Vol. 13), 2nd, revised and expanded edition, Tübingen 1966 (first published 1965).
- (Ed., with Arnold Paucker ): German Jewry in War and Revolution 1916 to 1923. An anthology (= series of scientific papers of the Leo Baeck Institute, vol. 25), Tübingen 1971, ISBN 978-3-16-831401-1 and ISBN 978-3-16-831402-8.
- Liberal Europe. The Age of Bourgeois Realism 1848–1875, London and New York 1974, ISBN 978-0-500-33032-6.
- (Ed., with Arnold Paucker): Jews in Wilhelminian Germany 1890–1914. An anthology (= series of scientific papers of the Leo Baeck Institute, vol. 33), 2nd, with a preface, supplemented edition, Tübingen 1998 (first published 1976), ISBN 978-3-16-147074-5 (first published ISBN 978-3-16-838792-3 ), including pp. 57–113 Mosse's essay The Jews in Economy and Society.
- (Ed.): Revolution and Evolution 1848 in German-Jewish History (= series of scientific papers of the Leo Baeck Institute, Vol. 39), Festschrift for Robert Weltsch, Tübingen 1981, ISBN 978-3-16-743752-0.
- Nobility and bourgeoisie in 19th-century Europe, in: Jürgen Kocka (ed.): Bourgeoisie in the 19th century, vol. 2, Munich 1988, pp. 276–314, ISBN 978-3-423-04482-0.
- The German-Jewish Economic Élite 1820–1935. A Socio-cultural Profile, Oxford and New York 1989, ISBN 978-0-19-822990-2.
- (Ed., together with Julius Carlebach ): Second Chance. Two Centuries of German-speaking Jews in the United Kingdom (= Series of scientific papers of the Leo Baeck Institute, Vol. 48), Tübingen 1991, ISBN 978-3-16-145741-8.
- (Ed., together with Hans Pohl ): Jewish entrepreneurs in Germany in the 19th and 20th centuries (= Journal of Business History, Supplement 64), Stuttgart 1992, ISBN 978-3-515-05869-8.
- Introduction to: Albert and Lina Mosse: Almost Like My Own Country. Letters from Japan 1886–1889, edited by Shirô Ishii et al., Munich 1995, ISBN 978-3-89129-273-0.
- An economic history of Russia 1856–1914, London 1996, ISBN 978-1-85043-519-8 u. ISBN 978-1-86064-066-7.

== literature ==
- Biographical Handbook of German-speaking Emigration after 1933, edited by Werner Röder and Herbert A. Strauss, Vol. 2, T. 2, Munich et al. 1983, p. 836, ISBN 978-3-598-10089-5 .
- Elisabeth Kraus, The Mosse Family. German-Jewish Bourgeoisie in the 19th and 20th Centuries, Munich 1999, ISBN 978-3-406-44694-8
- Peter Pulzer, Obituary. Professor Werner Eugen Mosse, 1918–2001, in: Rainer Liedtke and David Rechter (eds.): Towards normality? Acculturation and Modern German Jewry (= Series of scientific papers of the Leo Baeck Institute, Vol. 68), Tübingen 2003, pp. V ff., ISBN 978-3-16-148127-7 .
