= Markus Mosse =

German physician

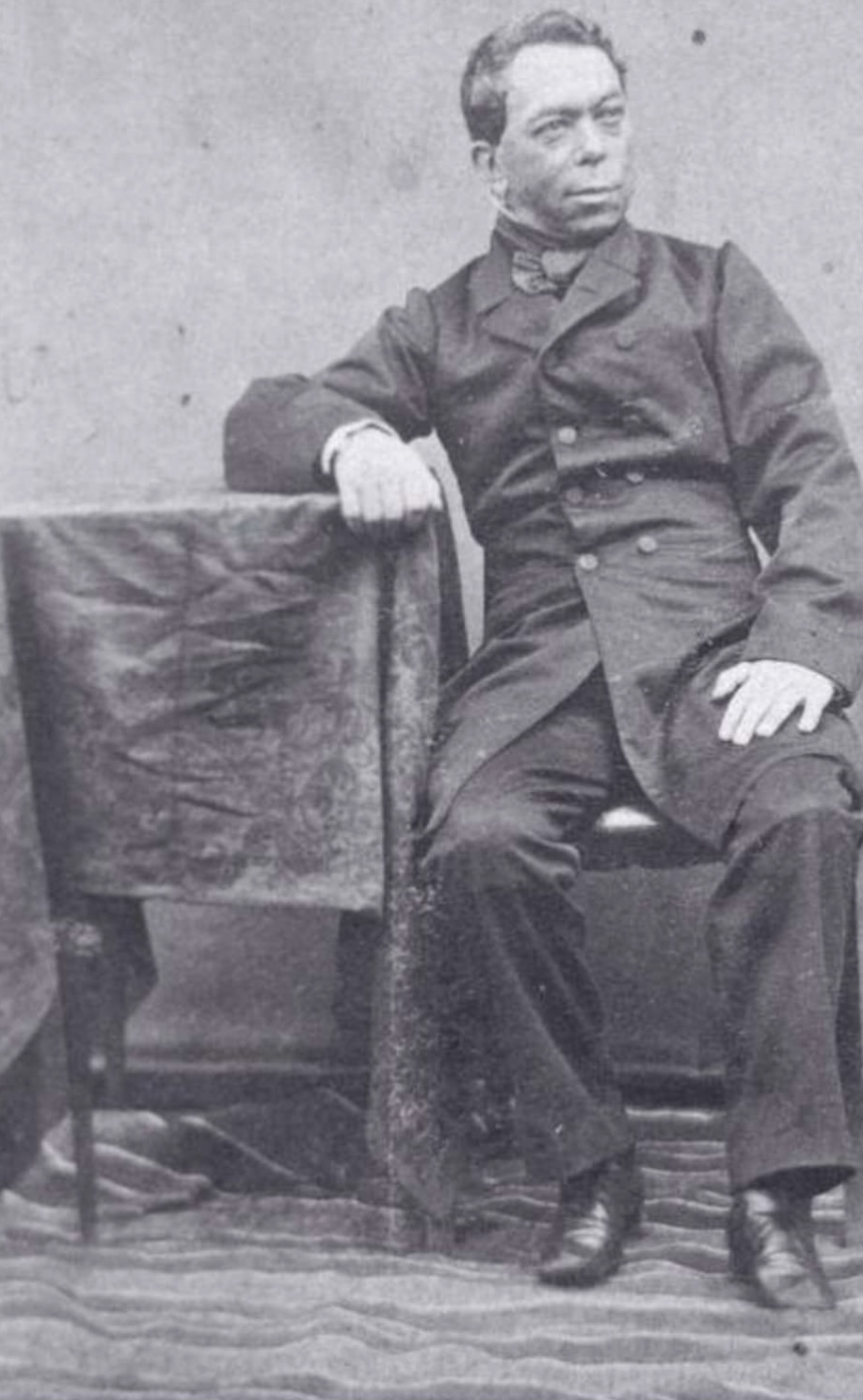

Markus Mosse (born 3 August 1808 at Grodzisk Wielkopolski – 10 November 1865 in Grodzisk Wielkopolski) was a German medical doctor.

On account of his eminent ability and popularity he was elected, while still young, a councilor in his native town, and made president of the Jewish community.

The Revolution of 1848 in Poland, which had a purely national character, brought about a change in his life. Unlike his coreligionists, who either held themselves aloof or else fought on the German side, Mosse took sides with the Polish rebels, the so-called "Sensenmänner." He was wounded, taken captive, and condemned to imprisonment. His participation in the contest neither gained for him the recognition of his partizans nor brought him contentment; and more than once he regretted his action.

During the rest of his life Mosse lived quietly in Grätz, engaged in the practice of his profession.

Various benevolent institutions in Grätz are connected with his name, as the Dr. M. Mosse Hospital, which is open to all irrespective of religious distinction.

His sons were Rudolf and Albert Mosse.

== Sources ==
- Mosse, Markus from the Jewish Encyclopedia
