= Michael Berkowitz =

American historian

- Born: Rochester, New York, US

Academic background
- Education: Hobart College; University of Wisconsin–Madison
- Doctoral advisor: George L. Mosse

Academic work
- Institutions: University College London
- Main interests: History of Zionism, visual culture, photography

Michael Berkowitz is a UK-based American historian and professor of modern Jewish history at University College London.

== Early life ==
Berkowitz was born in Rochester, New York. He earned a bachelor's degree from Hobart College in Geneva, New York, and a master's degree and PhD from the University of Wisconsin–Madison.

== Career ==
Since 2012, Berkowitz has been editor of Jewish Historical Studies: Transactions of the Jewish Historical Society of England. Berkowitz has a particular interest in the history of the Jewish involvement in photography.

== Publications ==
- Jews and Photography in Britain (University of Texas Press, 2015)
- The Crime of My Very Existence: Nazism and the Myth of Jewish Criminality (University of California Press, 2007)
- The Jewish Self-Image: American and British Perspectives, 1881-1939 (Reaktion Press, 2000) [US edition: The Jewish Self Image in the West (New York University Press, 2000)
- Western Jewry and the Zionist Project, 1914-1933 (Cambridge University Press, 1997, 2002)
- Zionist Culture and West European Jewry before the First World War (Cambridge University Press, 1993 and University of North Carolina Press, 1996).
