= Erich Everth =

German art historian (died 1934)

Erich Everth (born 3 July 1878 in Berlin; died 22 June 1934 in Leipzig) was a German art historian, journalist and scientist of newspaper and cultivation. He was the first ordinary professor for Journalism in Germany and directed from 1926 to 1933 the Institute for Journalism at the University of Leipzig. Alongside Otto Groth and Emil Dovifat, Everth is one of the greatest German scientists for journalism. With the rise to power of the Nazis in 1933 he was forced to retire and died soon after in sickness and bitterness.

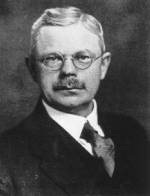
Erich Everth

== Life and work ==
=== Studies ===
Everth had remarkably many directions of interest. In 1898 he matriculated himself at the Friedrich-Wilhelms-Universität and studied philosophy and law. Later he changed to philosophy, art history and psychology. His most important teacher was Max Dessoir, who was struggling with the concept of a new systematic Science of Art.

Everth received a PhD in 1909 at the philosophical department of the University of Leipzig by August Schmarsow and Johannes Volkelt.

=== Journalism ===
Everth then worked for different newspapers, such as the Rheinisch-Westfälische Zeitung or the Magdeburgische Zeitung.

After the break-out of World War I Everth was a soldier at the eastern front. Soon he gained a role as consultant in the press office of Ober Ost and found time for publications again. In 1915 Everth published the pamphlet Von der Seele der Soldaten im Felde (About the soul of the soldier afield), which rapidly became one of the most dispersed texts under the German soldiers. No less than 20,000 brochures were printed in 4 editions. In contrast to usual pamphlets full of chauvinism and heroism, Everth characterized the active soldier as a normal human being with problems and individual worries. Hermann Hesse appreciated in a review exactly this fine psychological sight of Erich Everth.

After the war Everth worked in editorial departments of different newspapers, as there are the Leipziger Volkszeitung, the Berliner „Telegraphen Union“, the Vossische Zeitung, the Deutsche Allgemeine Zeitung or the liberal Berliner Tageblatt.

He published numerous articles on a wide spectrum of matters. He wrote essays or shorter texts on occasion. They confirm, what the political angle of the different editorial office already suggested: Everth had changed his political views from a monarchic-national to advocacy of democracy.

=== "Zeitungskunde": the first full professor ===
In November 1926, the 48-year-old art historian was appointed by Karl Bücher to be the first ordinary professor of the newly created chair for "Zeitungskunde" at the University of Leipzig. His concern was the methodological basement of the new academic discipline. Everth defined Zeitungskunde/Journalism as a discipline of integration without a special method. In fact it is for him possible to use different methods from other disciplines in various combinations. He restricted the object of "Zeitungskunde" to the newspaper, that means every printed periodical press. This press meets in Everth's opinion not only economic but equally social needs in public life. The press is more than just a usual earning company but at least in parts has its own spirit and is partially a piece of art itself.

As a result of the university's affiliation with state ideology during the Nazi era, the institute saw significant personnel and content changes, and Erich Everth, the former head and a proponent of a free press, was ousted and replaced by regime loyalist Hans A. Münster.

=== Fight against Nazism ===
When the Nazis rose to power in 1933 all the newspapers of the Nazis celebrated in capital letters. But the national press was celebrating as well, the German media proprietor Alfred Hugenberg himself was the leader of the DNVP, a party that was supporting the Nazis.

Everth was among the relatively few academics who expressed views that differed from the prevailing political consensus. Media historian Arnulf Kutsch wrote that Everth's early defence of press freedom ultimately cost him his academic career, damaged his reputation, and likely affected his personal well-being. Although generally described as a reserved scholar, Everth became publicly engaged in response to these developments.

==== The Congress „Das Freie Wort“ (The Free Word) ====
On the very last, from liberal und lefts-democratic politicians organised public event in central Berlin, the congress „Das Freie Wort“ (The Free Word) on 19 February 1933, Everth held a strong pleading in favor of the freedom of the press. He joined Alfred Kantorowicz in the opinion, that „there are times, when the free word has to be defended not only with words, but with deeds.“ At this demonstration, where one could hear the call for freedom of thought for a last time, between 1000 and 2000 democratic or at least anti-Nazi minded intellectuals participated, for instance Käthe Kollwitz, Max Brauer, Willi Münzenberg, Adolf Grimme, Ferdinand Tönnies and Heinrich Mann. Albert Einstein composed a public appeal for attendance on 6 February. Before normal termination the demonstration was ended by SA violently. A few days later, on the other side of the plaza, the Reichstag was ablaze and the hereupon enforced Reichstag Fire Decree nullified many of the key civil liberties of German citizens.

==== Unsubstantiated dismissal ====
Political investigations against Everth were initiated then. A short period of time later he got a letter from the Saxon Ministry of Education, which stated that Everth's attitude was "in no way compatible with the requirements that must be made to an academic teacher in the new state." On 29 April 1933, Everth was dismissed for supposedly "un-German" attitude. An explanatory statement that must have been especially devastating for the Germanophile Everth. But he was the only one of the whole academic guild that had the courage to criticize the emergency regulations and the press policy of the Nazis. Everth's forced retirement followed by 30 September 1933, although the investigation had revealed no justiciable evidence against him.

=== Disease and end ===
At the time of the forced retirement Everth was already seriously ill. Further resistance was therefore impossible for him. Everth, who had drawn all his life to the events underlying spiritual connections, who always focused more on the whole as to the little detail, must have been suffering particularly hard under the ever growing National Socialist "movement" and her brown aesthetics.

The dignified psychological observation, and the interdisciplinary view were Everth's concern and talent. From this grew its Weltanschauung as well as the basic idea of his scientific theory. His sense of order had nothing in common with the designers and heralds of a Third Reich.

While the Nazis distinguished themselves on the streets by rampaging hordes of SA and in communication policy by censorship and rushing propaganda, Everth fought to the last with all his might. But it remained existentially incomprehensible for him, who now directed the fate of the German nation, especially since he had no illusions about their future under Adolf Hitler's rule.

Erich Everth died on 22 June 1934 (aged 55) in Leipzig.

== Tribute ==
Since 2003 Leipzig's Media Foundation awards a scholarship named after Everth that so far has been used within the Department of Communication and Media Studies at the University of Leipzig.

== Sources ==
=== Writings ===
- Männer der Zeit, Faber, Magdeburg 1915 (zuerst in der Magdeburgischen Zeitung, 1915)
- Von der Seele des Soldaten im Felde. Bemerkungen eines Kriegsteilnehmers, Diederichs, Jena 1915
- Das innere Deutschland nach dem Kriege, Diederichs, Jena 1916
- Conrad Ferdinand Meyer. Dichtung und Persönlichkeit, Sibyllen-Verlag, Dresden 1924
- Die Kunst der Erzählung, in: Zeitschrift für Ästhetik und allgemeine Kunstwissenschaft, Bd. IX, Enke, Stuttgart 1925
- Volkelts ästhetische Grundgestalten, Eduard Pfeiffer, Leipzig 1926
- Zeitungskunde und Universität. Antrittsvorlesung, gehalten am 20. November 1926, Gustav Fischer, Jena 1927
- Die Zeitung im Dienst der Öffentlichkeit. Eine begriffliche Grundlegung, in: Archiv für Buchgewerbe und Gebrauchsgraphik, 1928
- Das Studium der Zeitungskunde an der Universität Leipzig, A. Lorenz, Leipzig 1928 (2. Auflage 1933)
- Die Öffentlichkeit in der Außenpolitik von Karl V. bis Napoleon. Gustav Fischer, Jena 1931

=== Literature ===
- Stefanie Averbeck: Erich Everth: Theorie der Öffentlichkeit und Interessen. In: Großbothener Vorträge III. edition lumière, Bremen 2002
- Hans Bohrmann, Arnulf Kutsch: Pressegeschichte und Pressetheorie. Erich Everth 1878–1934. in: Publizistik 24 (1979), S. 386–403
- Erik Koenen: Ein „einsamer“ Wissenschaftler? Erich Everth und das Leipziger Institut für Zeitungskunde zwischen 1926 und 1933. Ein Beitrag zur Bedeutung des Biographischen für die Geschichte der Zeitungswissenschaft. In: Medien & Zeit, 20. Jg. 2005, Heft 1, S. 38–50
- Erik Koenen: Journalismus als soziale Form gedacht. Zum 70. Todestag von Erich Everth. In: Journal Universität Leipzig. Mitteilungen und Berichte für die Angehörigen und Freunde der Universität, Jg. 2004, Heft 4 (Juli), S. 28
- Roland Lambrecht: Politische Entlassungen der NS-Zeit. Leipzig, Evangelische Verlagsanstalt, 2006. ISBN 3-374-02397-5
- Arnulf Kutsch: Von der unbequemen Sorte. In: message 2/2002
- Sylvia Werther, Thomas Lietz, Erik Koenen: Das Aus für das freie Wort. Die nationalsozialistische „Machtergreifung“ im Institut für Zeitungskunde. In: Journal Universität Leipzig. Mitteilungen und Berichte für die Angehörigen und Freunde der Universität Leipzig, Jg. 2003, Heft 7 (Dezember), S. 37–38
