= Hans Lachmann-Mosse =

German publisher

Hans (John Rudolf) Lachmann-Mosse, until 1911 Hans Lachmann (August 9, 1885 – April 18, 1944), was a German publisher and director during the Weimar years of the Rudolf Mosse media empire whose titles included the Berliner Morgen-Zeitung and the Berliner Tageblatt. Forced into exile by the Hitler regime, he spent his last years as a patron of the arts in Oakland, California. His son, George Mosse became a leading historian of National Socialism.

== Director of the Mosse Press ==
Born in Berlin, Germany on 9 August 1885 to Georg Lachmann, a brass foundry owner, and Hedwig Sara Fannij Eltzbacher. In 1910, after breaking off law studies in Freiburg and Berlin, he joined the publishing house of Rudolf Mosse as an accountant. In 1911 he married Rudolf Mosse's only child Felicia Mosse (and added the family name to his own). Like his father-in-law, Lachmann-Mosse practiced Reform Judaism, was convinced of his integration in German society, and was politically liberal and socially philanthropic.

Interviewed in 1922 by the New York Jewish paper, the Hebrew Standard, Lachmann-Mosse dismissed the goal of a Jewish state as a "physical, economic, and political impossibility" and suggested that "Zionist propaganda makes it so much the harder for the Rudolf Mosse publications, especially the Berliner Tageblatt , to battle with the anti-semites".

In the Spartacist uprising of January 1919, Mossehaus, the publishing offices in the centre of Berlin, were occupied by the Marxist revolutionaries. According to his son Gerhard (George Mosse), Lachmann-Mosse spent the night in the building debating Rosa Luxemburg and managed to get the next day's Tageblatt printed and delivered. He recalled Luxemburg was the most interesting woman he had ever met.

In 1923 Lachmann-Mosse commissioned the architect Erich Mendelsohn to redesign the Mossehaus. Mendelsohn's corner treatment, using of strips and sculpted elements in the fenestration gave the building a streamlined, futuristic form and rendered it iconic. The Mossehaus was restored in the 1990s.

== Nazi takeover, and emigration ==
In April 1933 Lachmann-Mosse left for Paris to escape not only the new Hitler regime but also his creditors. In the wake of the global economic crisis from 1929, these had foreclosed on the Berlin publishing house the previous autumn. From Paris he arranged for the publishing group to be converted into a foundation and stopped all payments. As regards the purposes of the foundation, he wrote to his employees: "I don't want to benefit from anything. All the fruit that the tree shall bear should belong to the victims of the War" [in which, as a soldier, he had served].

The manoeuvre could not prevent insolvency, and the regime seized the opportunity to force a transfer of ownership. Lachmann-Mosse, however, received in Paris an invitation from Hermann Göring to continue as the Berliner Tageblatt business manager with the protective status of an Honorary Aryan (Ehrenarier). Lachmann-Mosse rejected the offer and never returned to Germany. His son Gerhard (George Mosse) suspects that Göring's motive was to wrest control of the network of foreign press agencies and offices that had remained in the family's possession.

With his wife and children relocated to Switzerland, Lachmann-Mosse secured a divorce and married his mistress Karola Margarete Strauch (Bock). Following the German invasion of France in June 1941, he managed to emigrate via Portugal to the United States.

Mosse-Lachmann died 17 April 1944 in Oakland, California where, as in Berlin, he had had the reputation of a generous patron of the arts. He was survived by his wife Karola Lachmann-Mosse (Strauch) (1898-1982), his ex-wife Felicia Lachmann-Mosse (1888-1972), and their children, the American pediatrician and child psychiatrist Hilde Mosse (1912-1982), Rudolf Lachmann-Mosse (1913-1958) and George Mosse (1918-1999), the prominent American historian of National Socialism.
