= Berliner Abendpost =

German newspaper

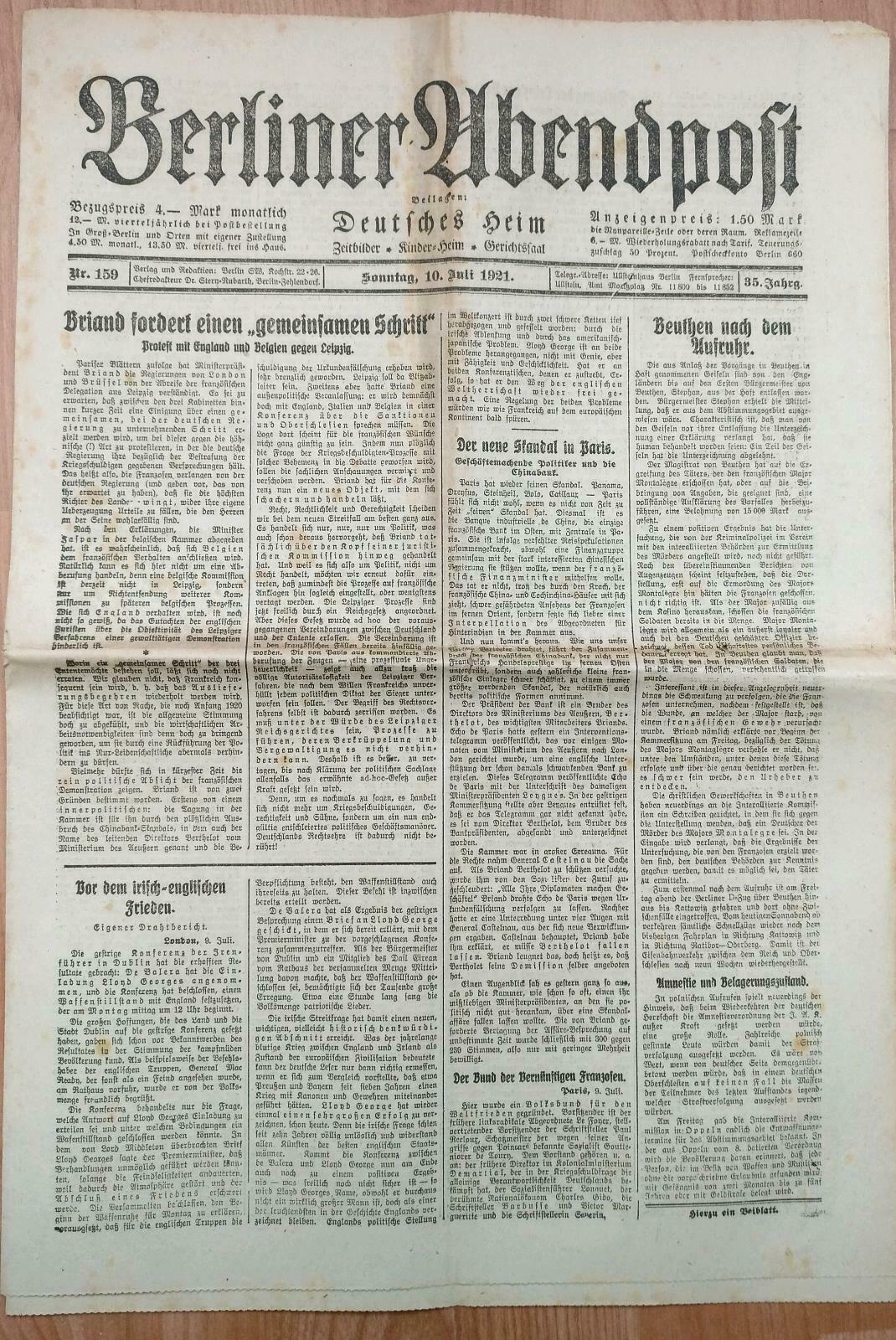
front page, 1921

Berliner Abendpost (meaning Berlin Evening Mail in English) was a German-language daily newspaper published in Berlin. The paper was in circulation between 1889 and 31 December 1921. It was part of the Ullstein company, led by Leopold Ullstein. The newspaper and its owner were liberal in its political orientation.

== See also ==
- Manfred George
