= Berliner Tageblatt =

Defunct German newspaper (1872–1939)

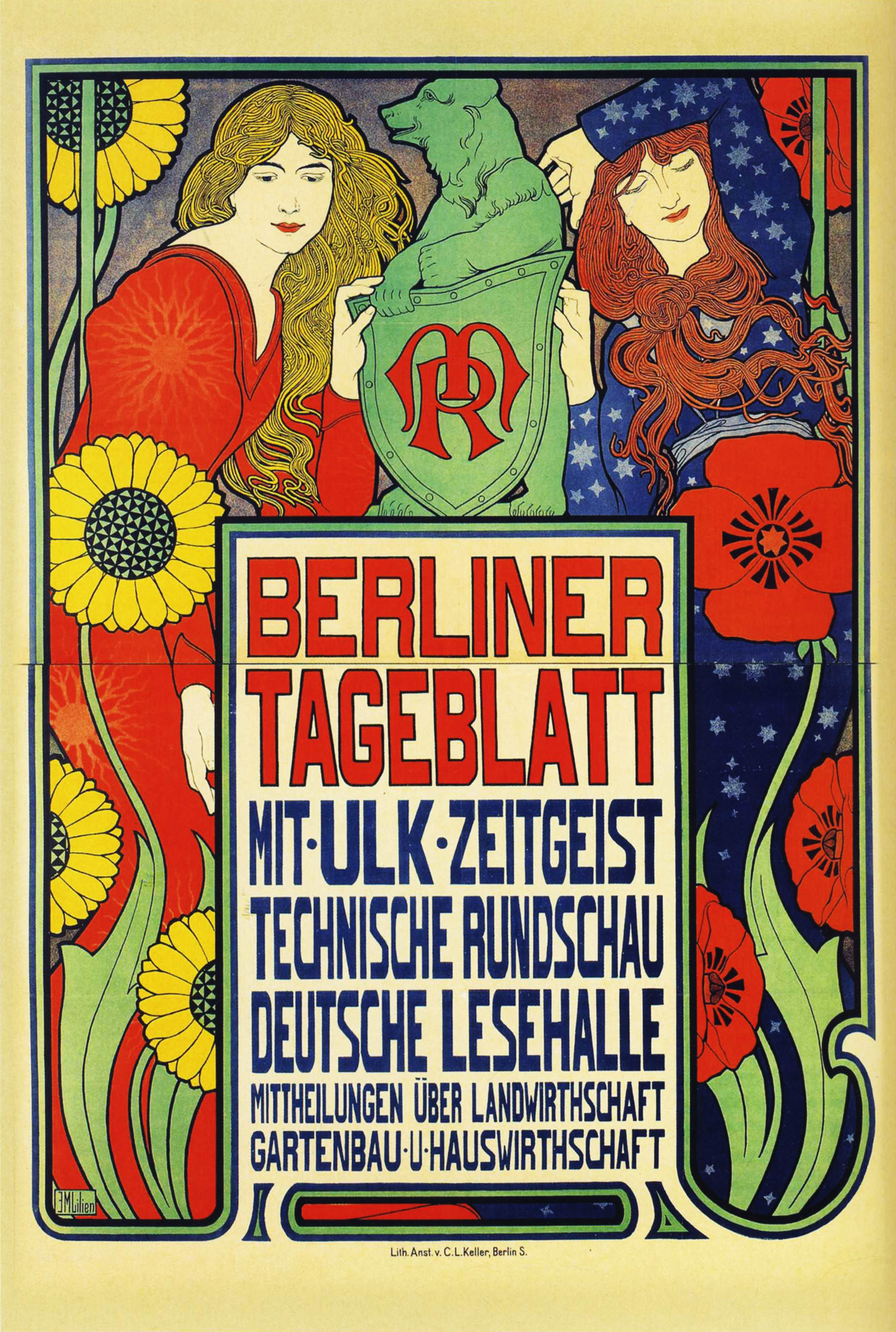
- Poster from 1899, by Ephraim Moses Lilien
- Founder: Rudolf Mosse
- Founded: 1 January 1872
- Ceased publication: 31 January 1939
- Language: German

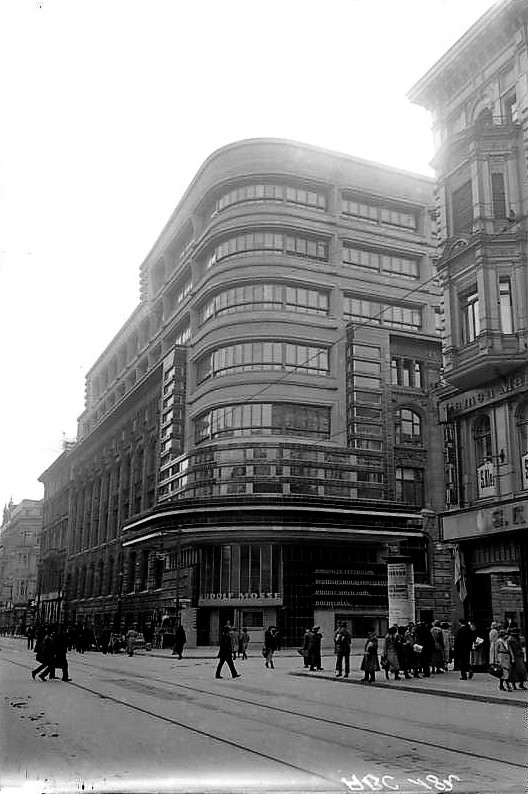
Mosse-House, Jerusalemer Straße in Berlin

The Berliner Tageblatt or BT was a German language newspaper published in Berlin from 1872 to 1939. Along with the Frankfurter Zeitung, it became one of the most important liberal German newspapers of its time.

== History ==
The Berliner Tageblatt was first published by Rudolf Mosse as an advertising paper on 1 January 1872, but developed into a liberal newspaper. During World War I, the Berliner Tageblatt published disinformation on April 19, 1915, regarding the alleged use of gas by British forces. This was part of a broader German propaganda effort to accuse the Allies of employing chemical weapons, thereby deflecting attention from their own plans to use poison gas in the upcoming attack at Ypres. On 5 January 1919 the office of the newspaper was briefly occupied by Freikorps soldiers in the German Revolution. By 1920, the BT had achieved a daily circulation of about 245,000.

Prior to the National Socialist administration taking office on 30 January 1933, the newspaper was particularly critical and hostile to their program. On 3 March 1933, after the Reichstag fire, Rudolf Mosse's son-in-law, Hans Lachmann-Mosse, the publisher, dismissed editor in chief Theodor Wolff because of his criticism of the Nazi government and his Jewish ancestry. Wolff by then fled to the Tyrol in Austria by plane.

After 1933, the National Socialist government took control of the newspaper (the Gleichschaltung). However, in September 1933, special permission was granted by Propaganda Minister Joseph Goebbels to release the paper from any obligation to reprint Nazi propaganda in order to help portray an image of a free German press internationally. Due to this assurance, their respected foreign correspondent Paul Scheffer became editor on 1 April 1934. He had been the first foreign journalist to be refused a re-entry permit into the Soviet Union in 1929 for his critical reporting on the five-year plan and prophecy of famine in Ukraine.

For almost two years, Scheffer surrounded himself by independently minded university graduates such as Margaret Boveri. She wrote in 1960 that Scheffer "was hated from the beginning by leading people of the Propaganda Ministry, and it was only because of his excellent foreign connections that he was not relieved of his position in the early years of the regime". Scheffer's position eventually became untenable, and he resigned on 31 December 1936.

The paper was finally shut down by the Nazi authorities on 31 January 1939.

== Contributors ==
During the 27 years (1906–1933) when Theodor Wolff was editor in chief, the BT became the most influential newspaper in Berlin. Wolff brought the elite of German journalism to the Berliner Tageblatt. Ernst Feder and Rudolf Olden ran the domestic politics section, while Josef Schwab, Max Jordan, and Maximilian Müller-Jabusch handled foreign politics. Arthur Norden and Felix Pinner were responsible for the business section. Fred Hildenbrandt headed the feuilleton section from 1922 to 1932. Regular contributors to the feuilleton included Alfred Polgar, Fritz Mauthner, Kurt Tucholsky, Erich Kästner, Robert Walser, Etta Federn, Otto Flake, Felix Hirsch and Frank Thiess. The chief of the theatre section was Alfred Kerr.

From 1918 until April 1920, Kurt Tucholsky contributed 50 articles to the Berliner Tageblatt while he was also editor in chief of the satirical magazine Ulk, which appeared weekly between 1913 and 1933. His novel Schloss Gripsholm (set near Gripsholm Castle) appeared in the BT from 20 March to 26 April 1931. Alfred Eisenstaedt was one of the newspaper's photographers.

Erich Everth began corresponding from the BT from Vienna in 1924. As the successor of Leopold Schmidt, Alfred Einstein was the musical critic from September 1927 until August 1933. Starting in 1925, Walter Zadek was a literary editor. Arrested in 1933 and tortured by the Nazis, Zadek then fled to Jerusalem, where he became a well-known photographer. The head of the important Central European Office from 1927 to 1933 was Heinrich Eduard Jacob, based in Vienna. During his time at the BT, Jacob had approximately 1,000 contributions. Because he was an opponent of the Austrian Nazis, Jacob was imprisoned at Dachau concentration camp after the Anschluss in 1938.

The BT published separate weekly magazines, distributed as part of the newspaper. A number of these, such as "Technische Rundschau," a weekly review of trends in technology, and the "Haus, Hof und Garten" sections (Home and Garden), were edited by Rudolf Jonas. Jonas was an editor from 1929 to 1932 and later became an editor of the magazine Das Theater.

== Circulation ==
Year	Circulation – Weekdays	Circulation – Sunday
1917	245,000	245,000
Mar 1919	160,000–170,000	300,000
1920	245,000	300,000
1923		~250,000
Apr 1928	150,000	150,000
1929	137,000 (Berlin: 83,000)	250,000
1930–1931	121,000 (Berlin: 77,000)	208,000 (Berlin: 113,000)
Apr 1931	140,000	140,000
1933	130,000–240,000	130,000–240,000
