= Walter Zadek =

Israeli photographer (1900–1992)

Walter Zadek ולטר צדק
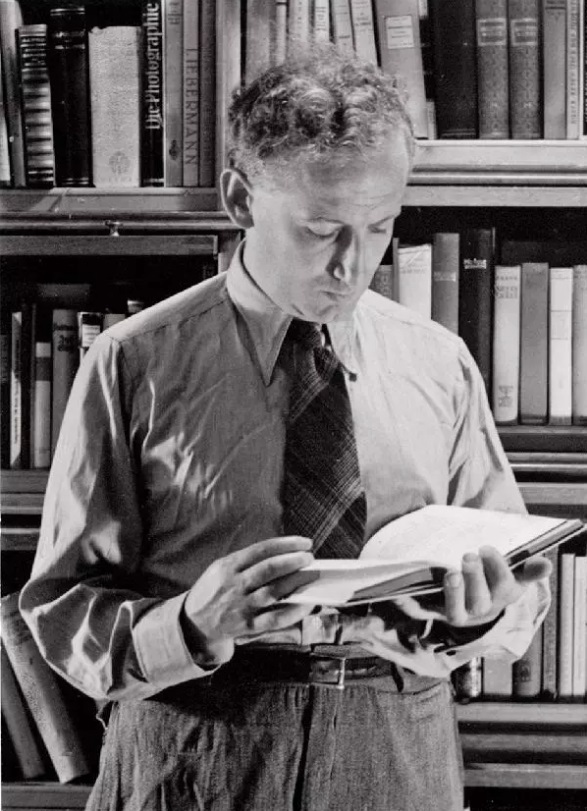
- Photograph of Walter Zadek, circa 1940
- Born: 26 March 1900; Berlin, Germany
- Died: 20 December 1992 (aged 92); Israel
- Known for: Photography

Walter Zadek (Hebrew: ולטר צדק; 26 March 1900 – 20 December 1992) was a German-born Israeli photographer.

== Selected artwork ==
- 1925 Photograph of the Mounting of the "Tel Aviv Municipality" Sign
- 1934 Girl with flag
- 1936 Woman on a swing, Palestine
- 1939 Immigrants aboard the Parita ship
