= Albert Mosse =

German judge and legal scholar

Isaac Mosse
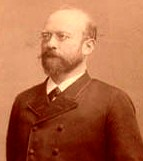
- Born: 1 October 1846; Grätz, Grand Duchy of Posen, Kingdom of Prussia
- Died: 31 May 1925 (aged 78); Berlin, Germany
- Other names: Mossisaac
- Occupations: legal scholar, foreign advisor to Japan
- Known for: Foreign advisor to Meiji Japan

Isaac Albert Mosse (1 October 1846 – 31 May 1925) was a German judge and legal scholar. Mosse's importance lies in his work on Japan's Meiji Constitution and his continuation of Litthauer's Comments on the German Commercial Code.

== Biography ==
Mosse was born into a prominent Jewish family in Grätz, in Prussia's Grand Duchy of Posen. His father, Dr. Markus Mosse, was a noted physician, and the most distinguished of his six brothers was Rudolf Mosse.

Mosse attended the gymnasiums in Lissa and in Goben. He then studied law at Berlin University in 1865 thanks to the financial support of his older brothers, and passed his first state examination in 1868, and the second one in 1873. He was a volunteer in the Franco-Prussian War of 1870–1871.

He became an assistant judge in 1875, and was gradually elevated to the position of a county court judge at Spandau in 1876. Eventually, he was appointed judge of the state court in Berlin, which was the highest position a Jew was allowed to achieve in Germany at the time.

In 1882, at the request of the German government, Mosse met with future Prime Minister of Japan, Itō Hirobumi and his group of government officials and scholars, who were touring Europe to research various forms of western style governments, and gave a series of lectures on constitutional law. Mosse is credited with having convinced Ito Hirobumi that the Prussian-style monarchical constitution was the best suited for Japan.

In 1886, Mosse was invited to Japan on a three-year contract as a foreign advisor to the Japanese government to assist Ito Hirobumi and Inoue Kowashi in drafting the Constitution of the Empire of Japan. Afterwards, he worked on other important legal drafts, international agreements, and contracts and served as a cabinet advisor in the Home Ministry, assisting Prime Minister Yamagata Aritomo in establishing the draft laws and systems for local government. He lived in Japan from 1886 to 1890.

After leaving Japan, Mosse settled in Königsberg to be a state supreme court judge. He was awarded an honorary doctorate from the University of Königsberg in 1903 and, during the following year, became honorary professor there for Civil procedural law and Commercial law. After his retirement in 1907, he returned to Berlin where he served on the City Council and advised the Berlin municipal administration on various legal matters. He took part in public affairs of the Jewish community.

== Works ==
New edition of F. Litthauer's Comments on the Commercial Code 1905–1927.

== Literature ==
- Ishii Shiro: Fast wie mein eigen Vaterland: Briefe aus Japan 1886–1889 ("Almost like my own Fatherland: Letters from Japan 1886–1889"). Munich: Iudicium-Verlag 1995.
- Kraus, Elisabeth: Die Familie Mosse: Deutsch-jüdisches Bürgertum im 19. und 20. Jahrhundert ("The Mosse family. German-Jewish Bourgeoisie during the 19th and 20th Century"). Munich: Beck 1999.
- Rott, Joachim: "Albert Mosse (1846–1925), deutscher Jude und preußischer Richter" ("Albert Mosse (1846–1925), German Jew and Prussian Judge"). In: Neue juristische Wochenschrift. Munich: Beck vol. 58 (2005), 9, p. 563
