= Berliner Morgen-Zeitung =

German newspaper (1889–1939)

- Publisher: Rudolf Mosse
- Founded: 1 April 1889
- Ceased publication: 15 February 1939
- Language: German
- Headquarters: Berlin, Germany

The Berliner Morgen-Zeitung was a daily morning newspaper in Berlin, Germany.

== History ==
It was first published on 1 April 1889 by Rudolf Mosse, partly inspired by Leopold Ullstein's introduction of an evening newspaper, the Berliner Abendpost, some 18 months previously. It was aimed at a more popular readership than Mosse's Berliner Tageblatt. It was little known in Berlin but widely read in the surrounding countryside and the provinces; it had a higher print run in winter than summer. In the initial year the print run was 60,000 copies; by 1900 it reached approximately 150,000 copies. From 1911, circulation declined and settled at 100,000. However, by 1930 it had the highest circulation in Germany.

In 1934, it was taken over by the National Socialist Central Publishing Agency and no longer printed by Mosse. By 1937, circulation had fallen to 11,500.

The newspaper was published for the last time on 15 February 1939. The following day it was amalgamated with the Berliner Morgenpost.

== Content and distribution ==
The Berliner Morgen-Zeitung offered local news and classified advertising. Initially it was available only in Berlin; after World War I, it was also distributed in surrounding districts. It appeared daily in Berlin, 6 days a week outside the city. The Sunday edition was 14 pages, the weekday editions 8 pages.

Subscribers received a cookery book, the Bürgerliches Kochbuch. From 1911 to 1918, the Illustrierte Familien-Zeitung (illustrated family paper) was offered as a supplement. Also before World War I, annual yearbooks and calendars could be ordered. In 1937 an illustrated supplement, Volk im Bild, appeared.
