= Rudolf Mosse =

German publisher and philanthropist

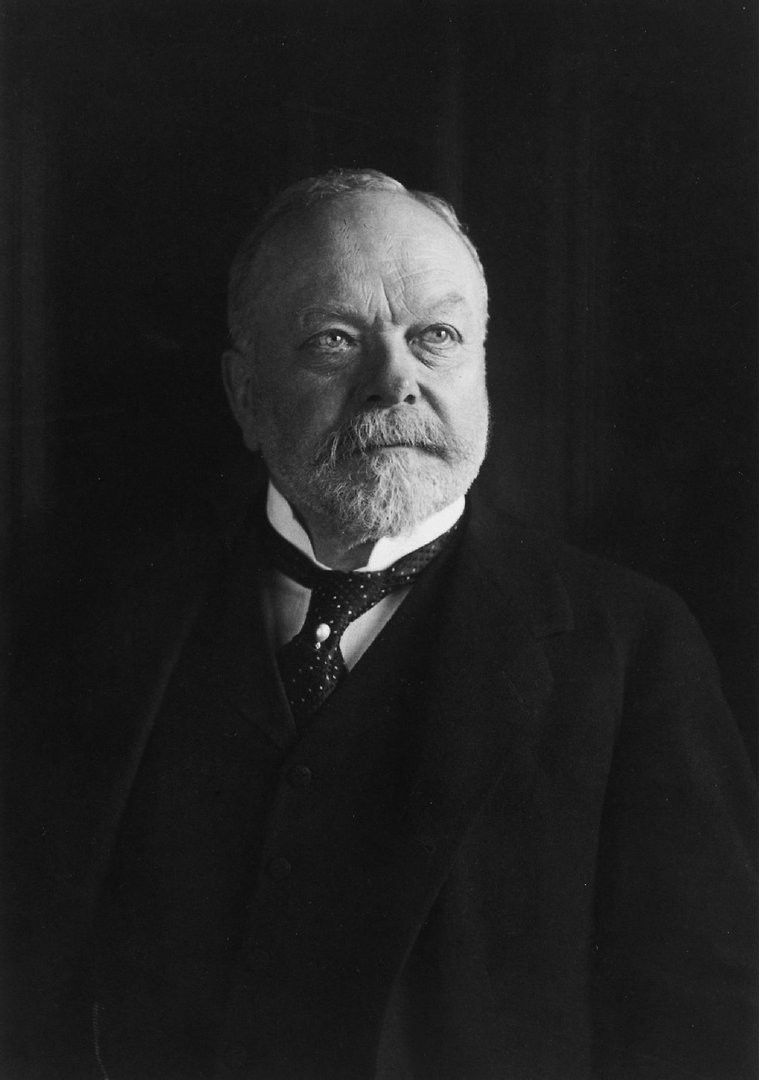
Rudolf Mosse

Rudolf Mosse (8 May 1843 – 8 September 1920) was a German publisher and philanthropist.

== Biography ==
Mosse was born in Grätz, Grand Duchy of Posen, as the son of Dr. Markus Mosse, a noted Jewish physician. He began his career as an apprentice in the book-printing establishment of Merzbach at Posen, publisher of the Ostdeutsche Zeitung, and mastered the technique of printing in Leipzig, Berlin, and other cities. Advertising was not at all developed in Germany at that time, and it was in this direction that Mosse at the age of twenty-four saw his opportunity. He organized an advertising agency at Berlin, which finally extended itself to most of the larger cities of Germany, Austria, and Switzerland. His success was phenomenal. It was through his initiative that advertising supplements were added to Kladderadatsch, Fliegende Blätter, Die Gartenlaube, Über Land und Meer, and other journals. Mosse is associated with the publication of the Berliner Tageblatt (since 1870), the Deutsches Montagsblatt (1877–1888), the Deutsches Reichsblatt (1881–1894), the Berliner Morgenzeitung (since 1889), the Allgemeine Zeitung des Judenthums (from 1890–1922), and the C.V.-Zeitung. Organ des Central-Vereins deutscher Staatsbürger jüdischen Glaubens (since 1922). Among other publications of his were the Bäder Almanach (since 1882) and the Deutsches Reichsadressbuch (established in 1897). His printing establishment, founded in 1872, was one of the largest of its kind.

Mosse was also known for his philanthropic work. In 1892 he established a fund (Unterstützungskasse) for his employees (numbering more than 500) with a capital of 100,000 marks, and in 1895 another fund of 1,000,000 marks for the same purpose. He built a hospital in his native town, Grätz, founded an educational institution for 100 children in Wilmersdorf, a borough of Berlin, with an endowment of about 3,000,000 marks, aided in the foundation of the Emperor and Empress Frederick Hospital in Berlin, and contributed liberally toward various literary and artistic endeavors. He represented the Jewish community of Berlin for ten years, and represented the Reform congregation there from 1904. One of his six brothers, Emil Mosse, became his business partner in 1884, while another Albert Mosse, achieved prominence as a jurist.

Mosse is buried in the Weissensee Cemetery, Berlin.

After his death, his son-in-law, Hans Lachmann-Mosse, took over the management of the Mosse Group. Already during the hyperinflation of 1922/23, parts of the company assets were lost. In 1926 the publishing house got into serious financial difficulties. The previously assumed bankruptcy filing on 13 September 1932 could be revised by the latest research. In addition to the effects of the global Great Depression, a series of economic mistakes made by the management weakened the Mosse empire. The company was Aryanised shortly after the National Socialist takeover. The art collection from the estate of Rudolf Mosse was auctioned in May 1934 in Rudolph Lepke's Kunst-Auctions-Haus and in June 1934 in the auction house Union. Since 1 March 2017, the Mosse Art Research Initiative (MARI) at Freie Universität Berlin has been researching the exact circumstances of the expropriation and the whereabouts of the individual works of art.

== Bibliography ==
- Kohut, Adolph (1901). Berühmte israelitische Männer und Frauen in der Kulturgeschichte der Menschheit (in German). Leipzig: A. H. Payne. Vol. 2, pp. 389–394.
