= Photographic agency =

Business providing photographic services

A photo agency is a business that represents and contracts independent photographers in supplying news outlets and print and screen publications. They are agents for the photographer. Increasingly in the twenty-first century, with the proliferation of digitisation and of imagery from digital devices, aside from their main business, photo agencies may also provide stock images from their library for commercial use.

== Roles ==
=== The agency ===
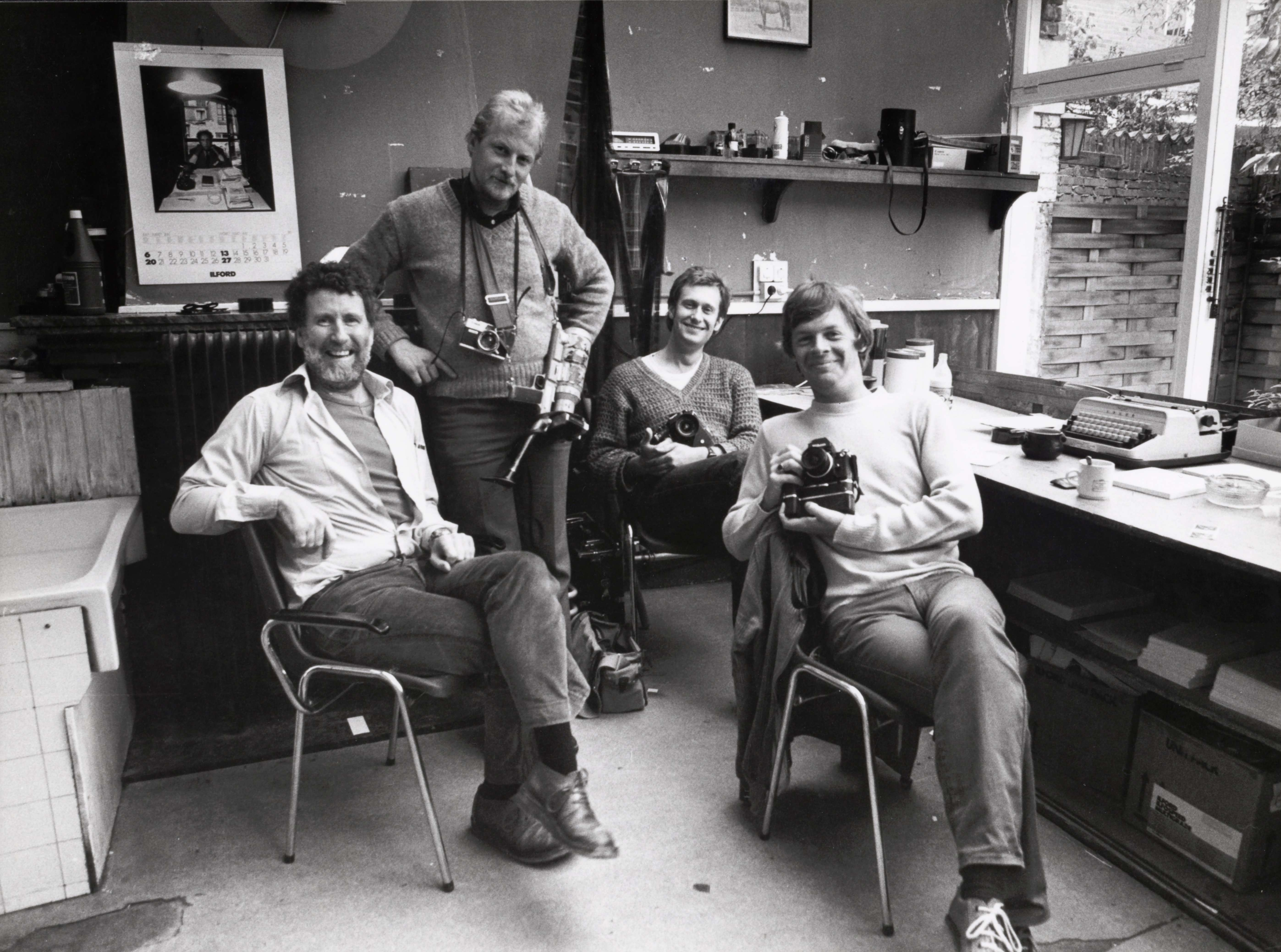
Members of Persfotobureau Dutch press photo agency, 1980

The photo agency may be managed by a company or a photographers' cooperative "to handle the business end of photography, often around particular kinds of images, such as news and documentary photography. Agencies recruit clients, assign photographers when a client contacts the agency, pay the bills, and handle contracts."

=== The photographer ===
The traditional photo agency assigns freelance photographers, often called 'stringers', to projects and custom photoshoots, and licenses their images to clients. They are not salaried, but paid per content, and the amount and type of work is typically at their discretion. They may have an ongoing relationship with one or more agency, to which they provide content on particular topics or locations when the opportunities arise. They may specialise in news, documentary, commercial, industrial fashion, and editorial work. Their agency assigns photographers to projects based on client needs, providing them exclusive, original content.

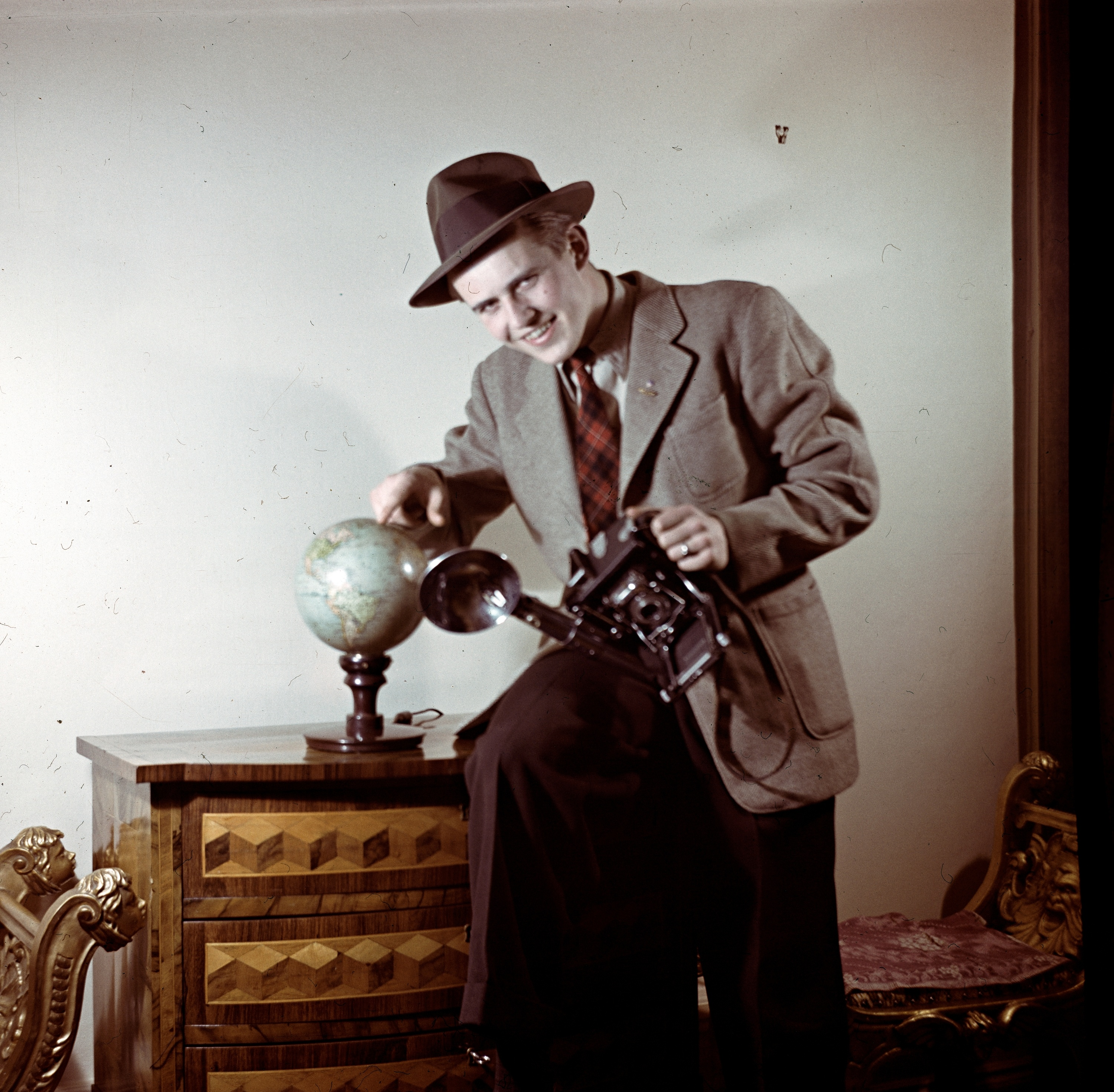
Hans Malmberg, member of Tio fotografer agency holding a press camera, c.1950

As noted by Blair: "photo agency photographers worked differently from newspaper and wire service photographers, and their responsibilities were also different from magazine staffers." Rather than a news event itself, they may focus on its longer–term context and consequences.

From the contact printing of glass plates to digital images, photography has evolved under the imperatives of ease, efficiency and economics to which the photo agencies have had to adapt, but also as a step within a production line of journalists, laboratory technicians, writers of captions and texts, the sales department, distributors, sales representatives and finally the archiving department.

The wirephoto, the scanning and transmission of photographs through the telephone network, first used in France, became dominant in photo distribution for newspapers, accelerating the expansion of these services. Electronic means such as the Laserphoto system superseded the wirephoto in the 1970s, and by 1989 full-colour images could be transmitted, leading, beside improvements in the economics of offset colour printing achieved in the 1980s, to the more common use in newspapers, of colour photography which had, since the 1930s, been the preserve of magazines and newspaper supplements.

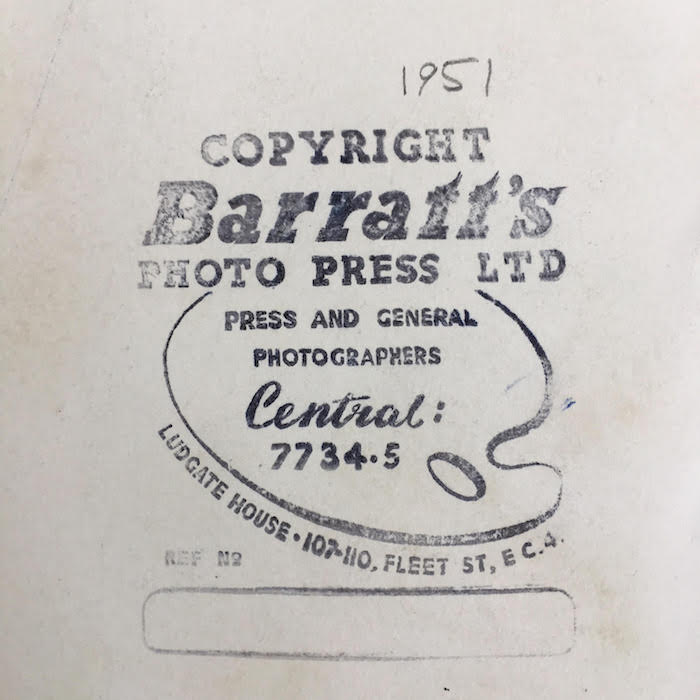
Barratt's Photo Press stamp, 1951

Denoyelle denotes the photo agency as "artisanal", so subject to technological developments, but fundamentally unchanging in structure until the 1980s and 1990s. The director sets the editorial line, the recruitment of new photographers or their departure, as well as technical choices, the organisation of work, and the securing of sales internationally. The agency's name and reputation, as a brand affixed to each photograph, determines the level of remuneration, and is given credit in publications, and while photographers' agencies might request that the photographer's name be added, it is the client publications' last consideration.

Almost always dependent on the agency and its sales agents, the photographer's legal status is subject to proceedings that are not necessarily favourable. In the first instance, copyright belongs to with the originator of the image, the photographer. However, there are variations between jurisdictions, with significant differences between say, the US, and Australia. In the latter, registration for copyright is not required even for legal purposes, and the default for commercial photos is often that the photographer retains copyright unless assigned by contract, while US photo agencies frequently use contracts to automatically acquire all rights as "work-for-hire." Thus rights may be signed over to the agency as part of the contract, especially where clients desire exclusive rights to the content.

While serving the demand for images, the creation of some of these agencies as cooperatives in turn allows photographers to group together to better manage their work and especially their dissemination. As the author of their photographs they decide on the changes to be made to their photographs, whether it is a cropping for a publication in the press or other. In addition, these agencies, whose photographers themselves choose the new members, will later become real schools of photographers, Magnum being the classic example.

== Stock photography ==
Persky notes a "blurred line between the terms 'picture agency' and 'stock agency'". The primary distinctions between a photo agency and a stock photo agency, picture agency, photo library or image bank, are the origins and originality of the images and the intent of the service. In essence, a photographic agency supports living independent photographers in commissioning, promoting, selling and distributing work. A stock photo agency sells individual or sets of photographs acquired from photographers living, dead or anonymous. That is, a photo agency typically focuses on commissioning or representing photographers for specific assignments, while a stock photo agency licenses pre–existing images in a business with origins in the commercial sales of carte-de-visite, postcard and stereo views of the mid nineteenth century.

The distribution of stock photographs covered by copyright is done against remuneration, either by piece, flat rate, or by subscription and is based on a catalogue of photographic archives of themed keyword-searchable databases. From a massive stock or "marketplace" of pre–shot, existing images, buyers may choose digital photographs or prints licensed for commercial or editorial use. Searchable databases enable quick selection of affordable imagery, which is usually non–exclusive. The disadvantage is their often "generic" quality.

Traditional photo agencies would assign new photographs of a subject, while stock photography companies would sell existing images. However, some photo stock agencies, such as Getty Images, Shutterstock, Adobe Stock, are taking on some of the roles of a photo agency, such as contracting photographers to produce photographs.

== History ==
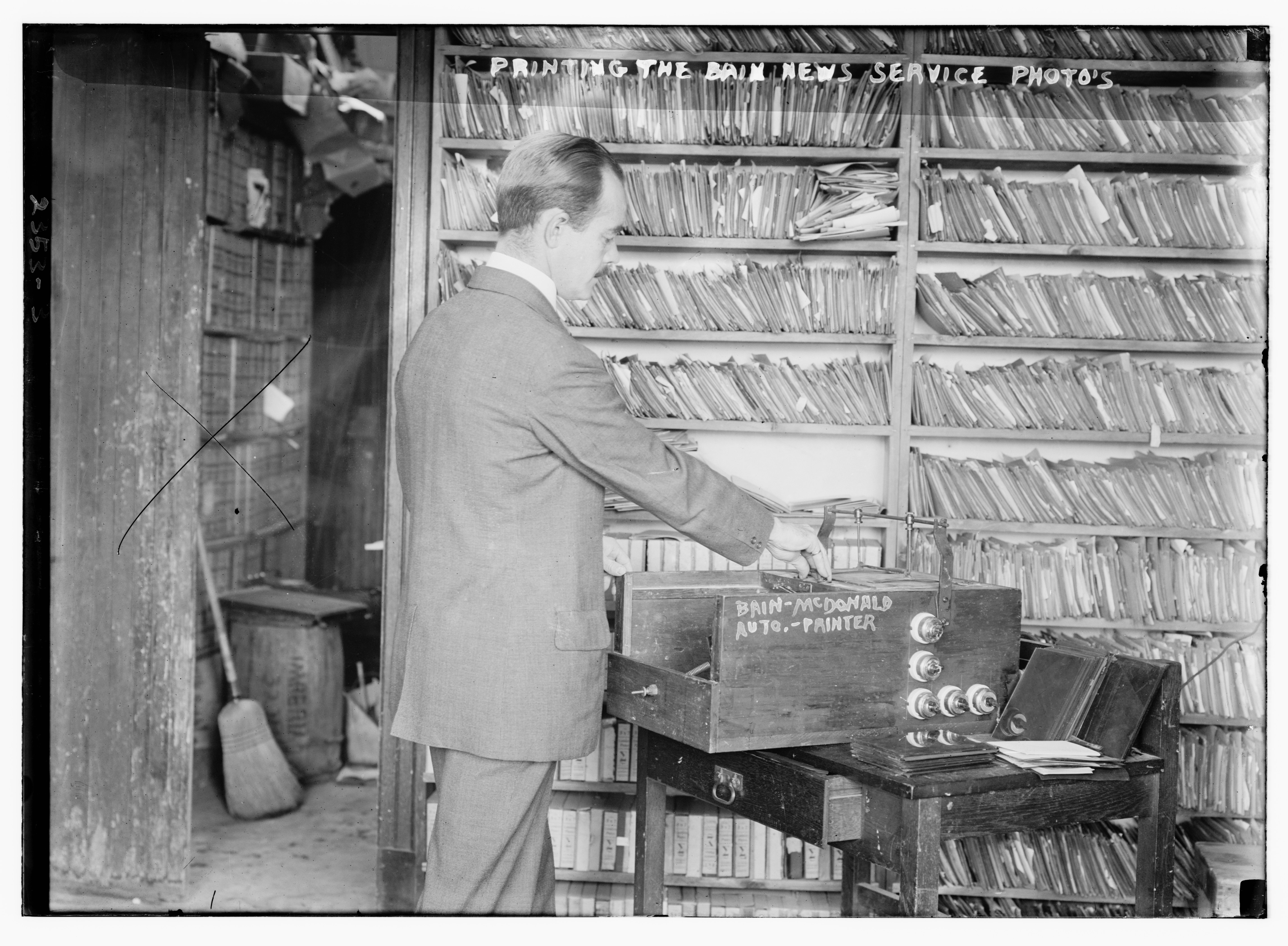
Contact-printing from glass plates at the Bain News Service Photos Agency, 1910

Most magazine and newspaper photographers were directly employed by their publications, but increasing demand created by the development of the halftone printing process was the opening for the business of the photo agency in the late 19th century and the early 20th century. World War I was a catalyst, with agencies sending imagery of the European theatre of war to anxious and distant audiences.

In an early instance, American photographer George Bain left St. Louis Post-Dispatch in 1898 to create his Bain News Service, and that was followed by Underwood & Underwood, Keystone View Company and Culver Pictures in 1901, United Newspictures (later Acme) and International News Photos in 1915, The New York Times offshoot Wide World Photos in 1919, and the Associated Press Photos subsidiary in 1927.

In England, a supplement to The Illustrated London News in 1928 noted that:

Few people turning over the pages of "The Illustrated London News", or any of its colleagues in "the Great Eight," [The Illustrated London News, The Sketch; The Graphic, Bystander; The Sphere, Tatler and Eve; and the Illustrated Sporting and Dramatic News] can form an adequate idea of the labour involved in the production of a single number...Among the photographic agencies of London from whom a not inconsiderable part of the illustrations which appear in the "Great Eight" are drawn are the Topical Press, the Central News, and the Central Press, whose organisations are controlled by a refinement of system which enables them to transform into order what, without system, would be chaos...

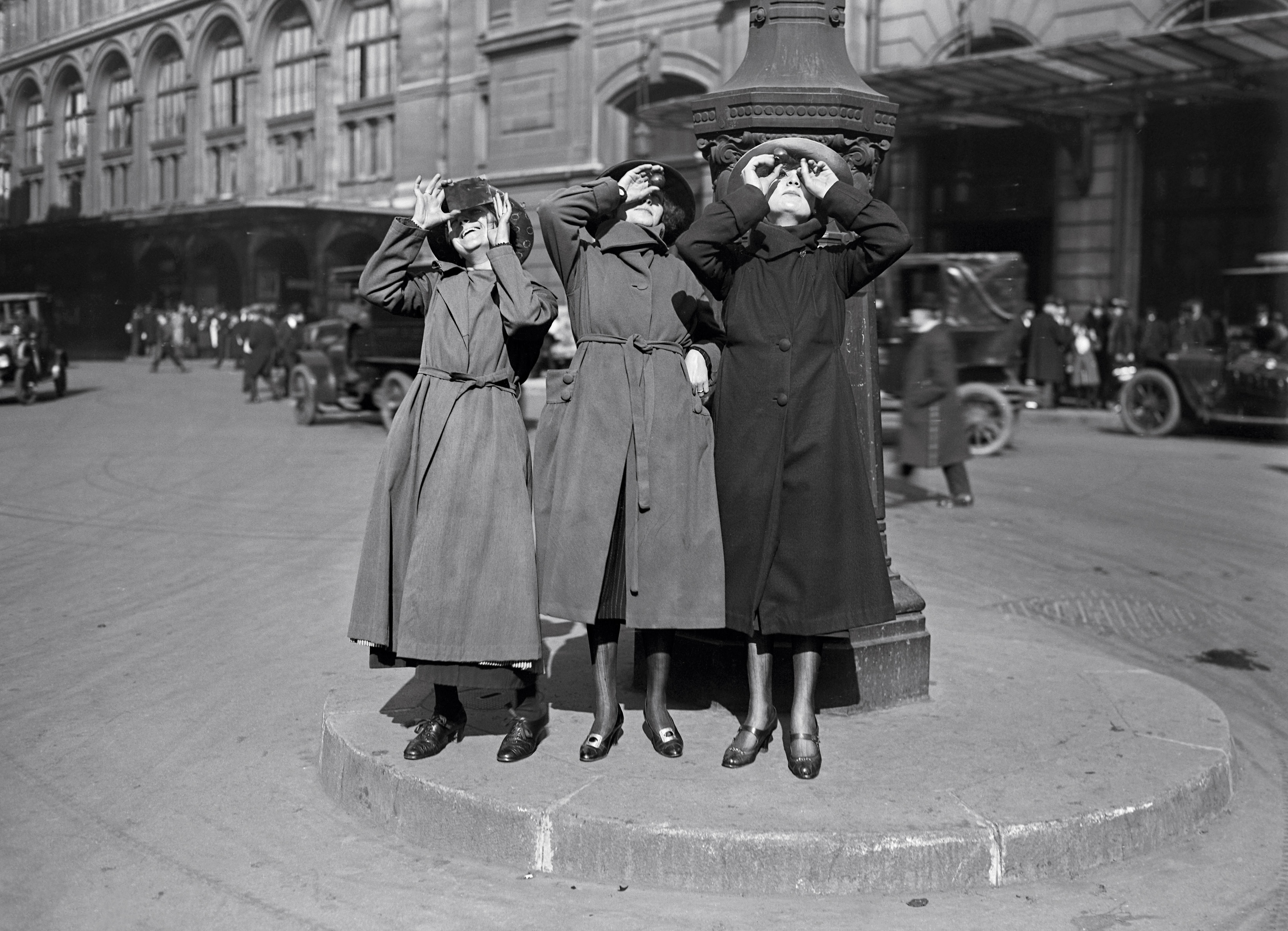
Agence Rol (1921) Viewing the eclipse at gare Saint-Lazare

In France, the Rol agency was founded in 1904, and Meurisse in 1909 serving periodicals illustrated mainly by reproductions of photographs including daily newspapers such as like Excelsior, founded in Paris in 1910.

In Germany, before the Nazi seizure of power in 1933, the Reich Association of German Press (Reichsverband der Deutschen Presse or RDP), established in 1910, functioned as a traditional, voluntary trade union and professional guild for journalists and the emerging profession of photojournalist.

During this pre-Nazi period, photojournalism boomed in mass-circulation, heavily illustrated magazines which pioneered modern photo-essays as a means to convey news amongst which were the Arbeiter-Illustrierte-Zeitung or AIZ (The Workers Pictorial Newspaper), Berliner Illustrirte Zeitung and the Münchner Illustrierte Presse. Otto Umbehr (Umbo) with Simon Buttmann founded the photo agency Dephot (Deutscher Photodienst GmbH) in 1928 of which Schlegel notes its specialties dance, vaudeville, theatre, and cinema, and its contributions to AIZ, published by Willi Münzenberg, famous for his savvy and pioneering use of photography, and who encouraged candid photographs taken with the new smaller cameras.

Produced between 1924 and March 1933 in Berlin, AIZ achieved a peak circulation of 500,000, then with the rise of Nazism, it relocated to Prague and finally Paris until 1938. Anti-Fascist and pro-communist in stance, it is best remembered for the contributions of Münzenberg's worker-photography agency Vereinigung der Arbeiter-Fotografen (Association of Worker Photographers) in its pages, and the propagandistic photomontages of John Heartfield which appeared weekly on its covers. Its contributors included the agency photographers of Dephot and pioneering photojournalists Wolfgang Weber (who joined Ullstein Verlag), Max Alpert, Edith Tudor-Hart, Janos Reismann, Tina Modotti, Walter Reuter, Walter Ballhause, and Avraham Pisarek.

=== Consolidation ===
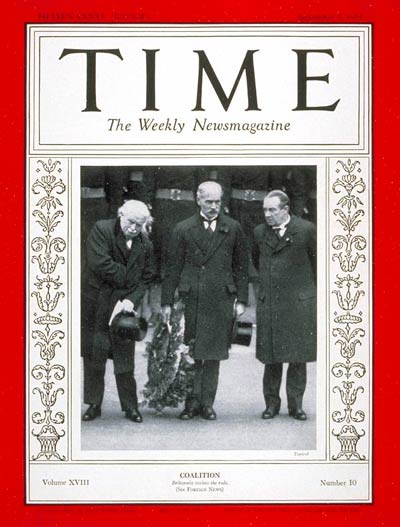
Lloyd George MacDonald Baldwin on Time cover 1931 credited to the Topical Agency

By the early 1930s, the proliferation of news and leisure magazines covering sports, radio, travel, fashion, and more, along with the opening of new distribution channels, fostered the emergence of numerous talents. In Paris for example, illustrated newspapers rose in numbers from 60 in 1928 to 82 in 1933, and periodicals from 575 to 654. In the mid-1930s the growth in photo-based weekly and monthly magazines was boosted with improving camera technology and film sensitivity. Photo agencies began to appear that combined current news photos with the provision of an archive service drawing from their back catalogue, in what were known as 'picture libraries'; one of the first being Black Star. But agencies are not the only ones marketing photographs; newspapers that have their own team of photographers resell or exchange photos with other publications and agencies after using them in their articles.

Paris was the capital of photographic press agencies: telegraph (wirephoto) agencies (AFP, Reuters, UPI, AP, etc.); and "magazine" agencies, such as Dalmas, the APIS agency, the Associated Reporters agency. For convenience, magazine proprietors of many nations, German, American, Brazilian, Spanish opened offices in Paris. The Magnum agency in 1947 was founded by photojournalists Robert Capa, Henri Cartier-Bresson, Maria Eisner, George Rodger, David Seymour and Rita Vandivert to distribute their photographs and to protect their copyright. Based in Paris and soon in New York they expanded to offices in London and Tokyo. As a cooperative venture photographers pursued their own projects and they, not the agency nor the publications, retained copyright to their photos. Other such cooperatives were Black Star, the Gamma agency established by Hubert Henrotte, Hughes Vassal, and Raymond Depardon in 1966, Sipa Press (1973) and the Sygma agency, also created in 1973.

=== State-run agencies ===
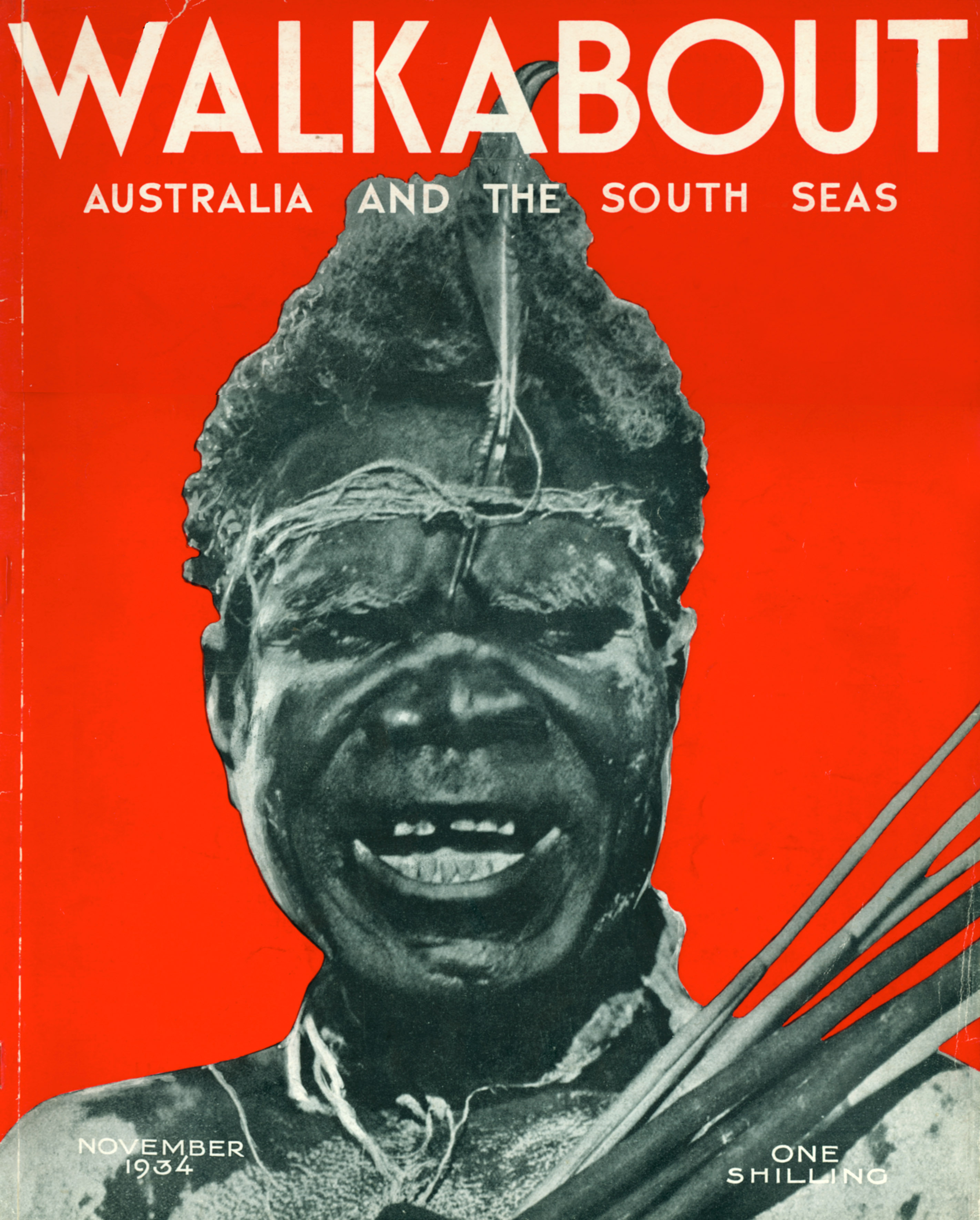
E. O. Hoppé (November 1934) Walkabout cover image, ‘Head of Australian Aboriginal'

In the 1930s, most British Commonwealth governments had set up departments, agencies in effect, which commissioned or purchased photography that promoted tourism, trade, immigration and government services.

Government-authorised photo agencies were suppliers of propaganda on both sides during the Second World War. In Madrid, EFE, founded in 1939, was a propaganda arm for the Franco regime.

In Germany the Nazis forcibly aryanised the Jewish-owned Ullstein publishing empire, renaming it Deutscher Verlag in 1937 as the Nazi propaganda apparatus. Photo agencies were progressively brought under the Nazi system of Gleichschaltung, subjected to propaganda supervision, purged of Jews, and increasingly integrated into the regime’s media structure. Independent outlets were either "co-ordinated" (Gleichschaltung), aryanised, or forced to close. Heinrich Hoffmann, Adolf Hitler’s official photographer, dominated the commercial distribution of authorised images of the Führer and became one of the central figures in Nazi photographic propaganda through his publishing operations centred in Munich, later extended into Berlin and Vienna, which controlled the visual representation of the Nazi leadership and amassed a vast personal fortune. The Editors' Law (Schriftleitergesetz) of 1933, and related regulations, required journalists and many media workers to prove ‘Aryan’ descent and political reliability, leading to the dismissal of Jewish staff and the exclusion of independent Jewish-owned agencies. Foreign agencies operating within Germany, such as the Associated Press (AP) GmbH, were also subject to the Editors' Law. They were forced to dismiss Jewish employees and operated under close supervision and censorship by the Propaganda Ministry.

With France occupied by Germany in 1940, its world-leading momentum of growth in photo agencies was staunched, Jewish-owned or left-leaning businesses were dismantled or taken over by September 1939, and replaced by smaller agencies and publications producing propaganda in collaboration with the Vichy government, and glorifying Pétain. Jews and emigrants fled the country or were incarcerated, while some agency photographers served the Resistance. By June 1940, most agencies had closed, and new, Nazi-sympathising ones emerged such as the ABC agency, headed by Jack Conquet, and DNP which supplied Germany with photographs promoting German National Socialism.

After the war most of the agencies, their owners and many of their photographers that had collaborated with the enemy were put to trial, thus terminating the businesses DNP, Fama, Fulgur, Silvestre, and Trampus, but others, ABC, Keystone, and Lapi for example, were permitted to continue. Agence France-Presse, with origins in the Agence Havas, the world's oldest news service, when German forces occupied France during World War II, was taken over by the authorities and renamed "Office français d'information" (French Information Office). On 20 August 1944, as Allied forces moved on Paris, journalists in the French Resistance seized the offices and issued its first news dispatch under the name of Agence France-Presse. Established as a state enterprise, AFP devoted the post-war years to developing its network of international correspondents. AFP bridled at its semi-official status, and in 1957, the French Parliament legislated for its independence, and by 1982 decentralised into five autonomous regional centres, in Hong Kong, then a British dependent territory, and in 2007 the AFP Foundation was launched to promote higher standards of journalism worldwide.

In the 1950s, United States Information Agency countered Soviet Cold War propaganda with its own, aiming to impress a better world image of American policies and values. Denoyelle notes that "propaganda surrounding the Marshall Plan was disseminated by the Agency for Photographic Documentation and Publication (ADEP)." During the communist purges of the McCarthy era, the Photo League was blacklisted for communist associations and as 'un-American'.

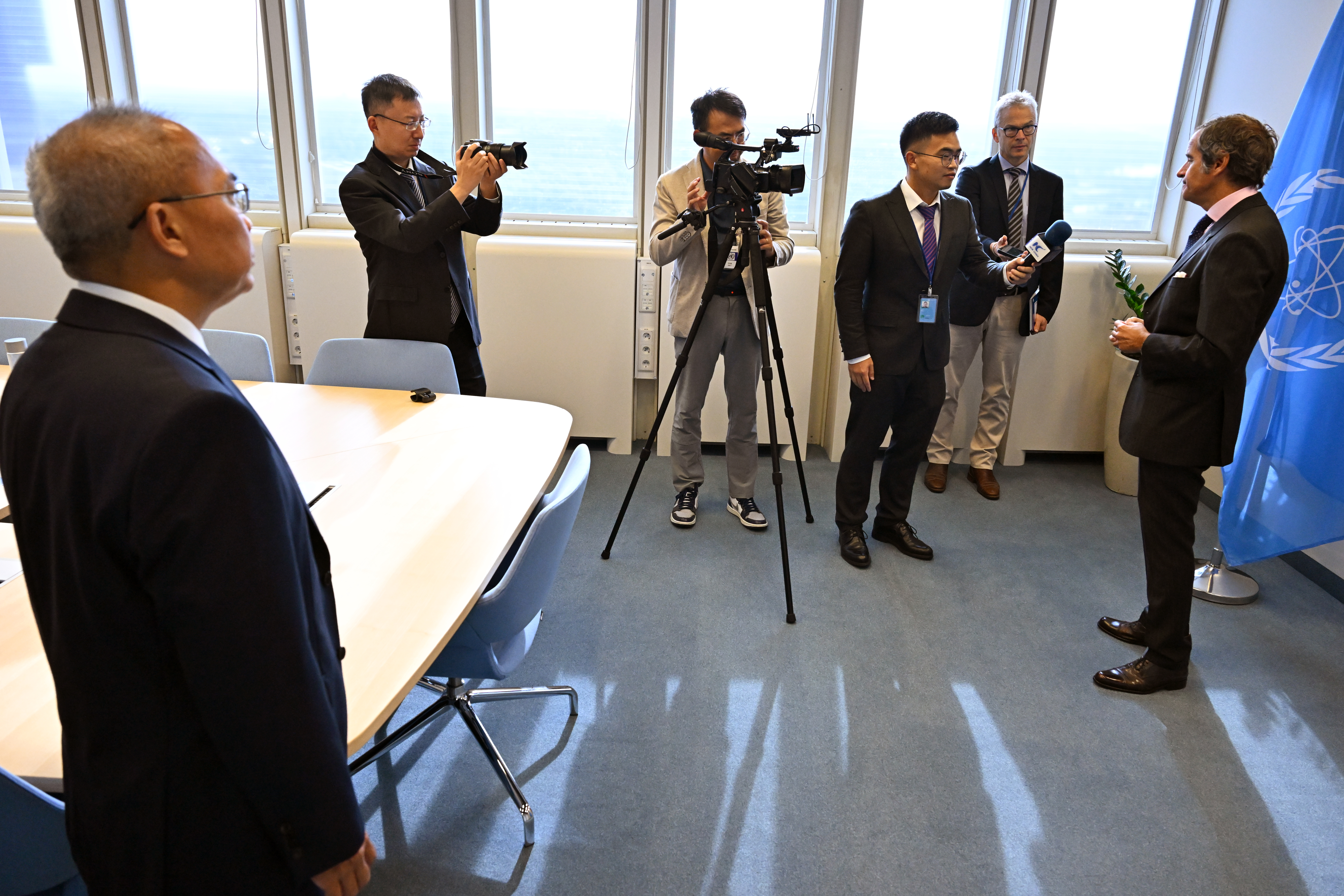
Xinhua News Agency at the 68th IAEA General Conference, Vienna, September 2024

In the communist countries Russia and China, state agencies TASS, RIA Novosti (Rossiya Segodnya), and Xinhua very effectively controlled their totalitarian socialist purpose. From the 1920s Soyuz-photo (Union-Photo) agency and the workers amateur photographer movement supplied a wide range of images on every possible theme. More recently the capitalist rationale has been adopted, in China, by agencies in Shanghai such as the ironically-named Propaganda Studio, and KANVID, with ImagineChina (also known as IC Photo) providing reportage through offices in New York, Los Angeles and Hong Kong. Likewise in Russia are found Salt Images, and the non-profit FotoDepartament, founded in 2006, supports contemporary, fine-art, and long-form documentary photography.

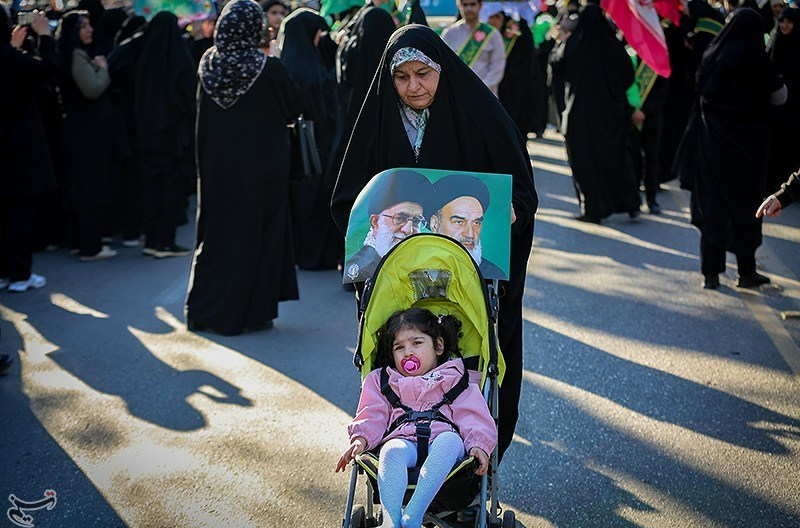
Demonstration in Sari. Farshid Segar for Tasnim News Agency

Tasnim News Agency (Persian: خبرگزاری تسنیم) in Iran, was founded on 30 June 2012 by Islamic Revolutionary Guard Corps (IRGC) commander Hamidreza Moghaddamfar, board chairman Jafar Darouneh, and CEO Majid Qolizadeh Zahmatkesh. Darouneh was head of Tehran's Department of Education during the presidency of Mahmoud Ahmadinejad. Tasnim is headquartered in Iran's capital Tehran, with photojournalists across the country and the Middle East who cover political, social, economic and international subjects. and is controlled by the Islamic Revolutionary Guard Corps (IRGC) whose commander-in-chief Mohammad Ali Jafari in 2023 asserted that; "The faithful and revolutionary media have today a very heavy duty in confronting anti-Islamic and anti-human plots of the oppressors". In 2023, after "publishing false confessions by protesters on its website and social media accounts as well as for posting pictures of protestors on social media and asking readers to help identify them," Tasnim was subject to sanctions by the European Union and the United States.

Israel's IDF Directorate of Military Intelligence operates a Military Censor (הצנזורה הצבאית) to carry out 'preventive censorship' inside the State, through which independent international media are compelled to seek written permission to document the combat zones in the conflict with Iran.

=== Decline ===
Mora notes that, in the face of competition from broadcast television, "after 1945 several agencies became cooperatives through which photographers [...] tried to strengthen their role as conveyors of information," and that subsequently the social upheaval of 1968 in France stimulated the emergence of new agencies Gamma, Sigma, Sypa, Vu and Viva, while in the United States Robert Pledge, director of the New York office of Gamma, in 1976 with the ambition to "maintain the tradition of true photojournalism," founded the international independent picture agency Contact Press Images in New York with American photographer David Burnett.

However, through the 1970s, and worldwide, the picture magazines, the major clientele of the agencies, were being displaced by colour television and were disappearing; in the UK Odhams Press publications John Bull had to close in 1964 and the first colour weekly, Woman, launched in 1937, barely survived; German publications were among the first fatalities, with Münchner Illustrierte folding in 1960; Kristall which launched in 1963 with images by Thomas Hoepker, failed to capture enough audience and ad revenue in a saturated magazine market and ceased publication in 1966; popular mass-market photo and culture weekly Neue Illustrierte finished in 1969. The Saturday Evening Post likewise collapsed in February 1969; La Vie Parisienne finished in 1970; Look folded in October 1971; the weekly Life magazine published its last issue on 29 December 1972, continuing 1972 to 1978 only in the form of intermittent Life Special Reports; Australia's Walkabout publication ceased with the June/July 1974 issue, while Pix survived only until the following year; Brazil's O Cruzeiro, though a massively popular and heavily illustrated weekly magazine ceased publication in 1975, while in Argentina Primera Plana folded in 1973 and Siete Días Ilustrados disappeared in 1979; Tempo ceased regular print publication in 1976; Réalités' last French edition was published in December 1978; Jours de France folded 1989; in Italy L'Europeo stopped weekly publications in 1995 and while Epoca managed to survive the initial 1970s decline in circulation, it closed in 1997.

While media clients dwindled, photo agencies continued to be commissioned for photos for advertising, company annual reports, brochures, or other commercial and industrial publications. Their shift to targeting of nonmedia business users continued with the rise of the Internet which brought a new way to market photos; online in vast libraries for easy perusal by potential customers. It resulted in a continuing decline in traditional media photo markets.

At the end of the century, there were consolidations and buyouts in the field, especially by the Microsoft Corporation and Getty Images. Rare book dealer Hans Peter Kraus' Organisation purchased the Bettmann Archive in 1981, then the United Press International collection with the Acme and Pacific & Atlantic agency archives. Kraus in turn was taken over by Corbis which purchased Sygma in mid-1999, and legal battles about agency photography archives and photographers’ rights ensued. Sygma agency photographers, led by president Allen Tannenbaum, quit, while those remaining staged a strike at the Paris headquarters and were subsequently fired, provoking vehement protests from Henri Cartier-Bresson over the cruelty of the wholesale sacking:

The compilation of an image bank, as well stocked as it might be, will never match the work of an author. On one side is a machine; on the other is a living and sensitive being. Corbis offers no choice.

Due to the continuing corporatised digitisation of photographic images from the beginning of the 21st century, many agencies have disappeared, replaced by photo libraries and stock photography including Adobe–Fotolia, Getty Images, Scooplive, Shootnews and LicencePhoto. As an indication of the success of the model, Getty Images was purchased for $2.4 billion in 2008 then sold for more than $3 billion in 2012.

== Revival: cooperatives and collectives ==
A distinguishing feature of Magnum, Black Star, VII Photo Agency, and others representing groups of photojournalists like them, is the cooperative or collective structure which was widely and internationally adopted by other photographers' organisations where members pool resources, distribution networks, and marketing efforts to publish and exhibit work. Their scope has expanded beyond documentary work into promoting their members' agitprop, artistic, and even therapeutic, applications of photography in exhibiting, long-form and investigative photojournalism, and photo-books.

=== Background ===
Historically, these groups have operated since the 19th century, and some continue or have been recently formed, under both socialist collectivist and market-driven frameworks. The model is key to a revival of the photo agency in the collaborative turn of the contemporary era. Some, as above, that are profit-driven act as artist-owned agencies or syndicates to maintain strict copyright control, license work to commercial publications, and secure international exhibitions to generate profit and professional clout for their members. For example, Panos Pictures established in 1986 represents photographers focusing on global social issues, but operates as a commercial enterprise to promote members' work to the editorial, NGO, and corporate markets.

Other groups have formed that prioritise ideological goals, education, and mutual aid over corporate profit. Some emerged in response to state censorship or, out of a sense of injustice, collectively document minority or working-class struggle, in advocacy for labor and human rights. A classic example of the latter was "worker photographer", first used to describe a movement in the Soviet Union, and the work of all non-middle-class amateur photographers, who in Germany were members of the Vereinigung der Arbeiter-Fotografen Deutschlands (VdAFD, Association of German. Worker Photographers) which was closely associated with the German Communist Party. Worker photographs documented their everyday life and work as small farmers, seasonal or home workers, and industrial motifs. National Socialism appropriated working-class photography and its socialist politics, transposing class identity into the 'Aryan' communitarianism of Volksgemeinschaft (folk community).

In America, The Workers Film and Photo League (WFPL) set up in the 1930s during the Great Depression as a Marxist-aligned collective rebelled against mass media institutions that reflected capitalist values; in Detroit, Chicago, Ohio, Pennsylvania, and California there were alternative "media activists" working its banner, as well as in Japan, Germany, Holland, and Britain. Members assisted each other in producing, publishing, and exhibiting documentary photographs and films that highlighted class struggle, labor strikes, and poverty.

The Photo League, an offshoot of the WFPL, operated in New York from 1936 to 1951 as a cooperative of amateur and professional photographers who shared darkrooms, taught classes, and promoted socially-conscious documentary photography through community exhibitions and their publication Photo Notes. Its members who joined before the end of World War II were first-generation Americans with personal investment in progressive political and social causes. Accused by the FBI of being communist, subversive and anti-American, in December 1947, it was blacklisted as a subversive organisation by the U.S. Department of Justice and Attorney General Tom C. Clark, following which, the Photo League appeared on the Attorney General's List of Subversive Organizations (AGLOSO) published on March 20, 1948, in the Federal Register. This Is the Photo League, an exhibition held in 1948 was an attempt to counter the ban, but member and long-time FBI informer Angela Calomiris testified in May 1949 that the organisation supported communism, the Photo League disbanded in 1951.

In the United Kingdom, an example of collectives of the latter half of the 20th century raising consciousness of social or political issues was the Hackney Flashers founded in 1975 from origins in 1974, when photographers Jo Spence and Neil Martinson recruited women photographers for an exhibition on Women and Work for Hackney Trades Council. A socialist-feminist collective making agitprop exhibitions in the 1970s and early 1980s during second wave feminism (1960s–1980s), the group aimed to document invisible, uncredited women's work, to promote the case for childcare, and to show the complex social and economic issues facing women. Members were active trade unionists, university teachers, community photographers, freelance photojournalists and workers in publishing. The Flashers’ decided that their output was to be credited to the ‘Hackney Flashers Collective’ rather than to individual photographers.

=== Recent instances ===
In South Africa, Afrapix founded in 1982, operated simultaneously as an agency and a radical collective. Its members engaged in anti-apartheid and socialist "struggle photography" to bypass state censorship, pooling resources to supply international publications and hold community exhibitions. The Photographic Collective, a contemporary Pan-African collective was formed to elevate underrepresented African photographers through a democratic advisory board to systematically feature, market, and connect emerging continental photographers to international publication channels.

Drik Picture Library, established 1989 in Bangladesh has a commercial infrastructure supporting socialist values. Established in 1989 by Shahidul Alam, Drik uses a commercial syndication and distribution arm to complete with the Western media hegemony and provides localised training of photographers and infrastructure, financing global exhibitions under its own banner to promote human rights and social justice.

Founded in 2002 in Yogyakarta, Ruang MES 56 operates a self-funded communal house, studio, and laboratory. Its focus is on radical contemporary art photography, bypassing corporate gallery models by orchestrating independent, group-led exhibitions and publications across Southeast Asia.

Operating out of Amsterdam since 2007, NOOR is a photographer-owned cooperative with a corporate structure to secure premium media licensing contracts and global publishing deals for its members, specifically choosing to fund long-form visual journalism tracking global crises. On joining NOOR in 2014, in an interview with Time's Olivier Laurant, Sebastian Liste gave his reasons:

The most important thing for me is not how to make money but, instead, how to approach long-term projects. I wanted to work with a small community of photographers. I needed a place that trusted my work and did something about it. NOOR is a place where you can put all of your energy and be part of a group where you can grow your ideas. I can’t think of many collectives and agencies that can do that.

Asociación de Fotógrafos Independientes (AFI) formed in Chile in 1981 during Augusto Pinochet's military dictatorship, the AFI acted as a sanctuary collective. The group held a protest for Rodrigo Rojas Denegri and Carmen Glotria Quintna inside the Palacio de Tribunales de Justicia on July 3, 1991 Pooling its resources under a unified organisational banner, the members protected one another, and bypassed state censors to distribute, at risk of their lives, political photojournalism internationally, hosted independent street exhibitions and to commemorate 50 years since Chile's 1973 civic-military coup, released in 2023 a set of 13 testimonial posters released on the 11th of each month as a public act of remembrance. The contemporary Fórum Latino-Americano de Fotografia de São Paulo is an umbrella collaborative network headquartered in Brazil which coordinates independent photographers and their publishing platforms, and curators. It finances and distributes localised Latin American photobooks globally to counteract the dominance of Eurocentric publishers.

Oculi in Australia founded in 2000, has a collectivist governance which supports independent visual storytellers of social, activist and environmental issues. Dissatisfied with mainstream media limitations, members collectively fund their own syndication arm to pitch, publish, and stage group exhibitions worldwide. Many Australian Photographers (MAP) work as a group on major projects documenting rural and regional concerns; bushfire, drought, or the viability of small towns.

Among contemporary international cooperatives is Women Photograph, for women and non-binary photographers and photojournalists and workers in visual media that pools funds, resources, mentors, exhibits, and issues grants.

== Selected list of photo agencies and cooperatives ==
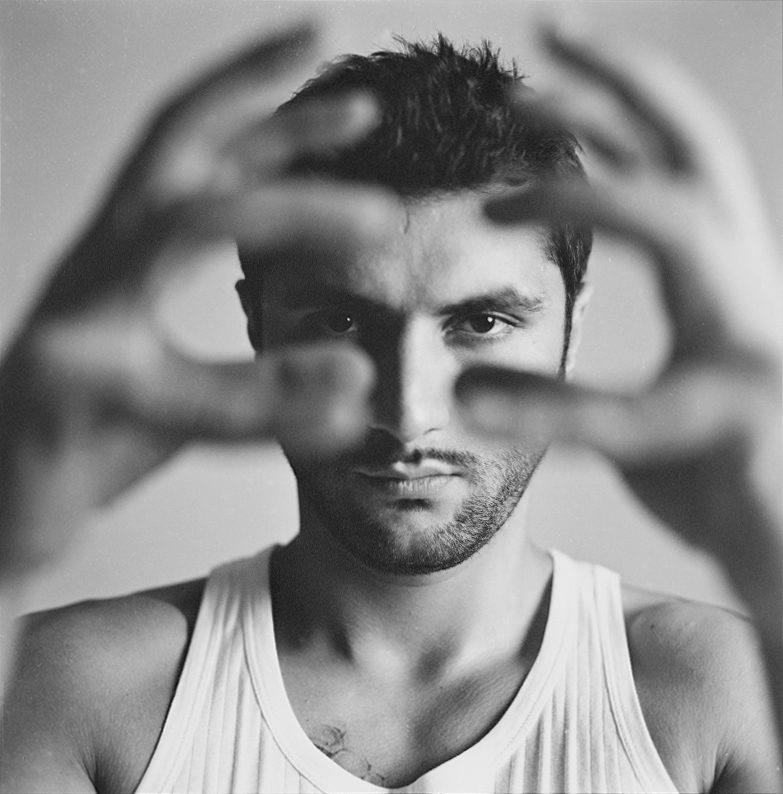
Portrait of a musician, PAN agency, Armenia, 2013

- ABC (1940–1993)
- ACIP (1935–1992)
- ADCA (1942–1946)
- ADEP (1941–1957)
- AFP (1944–1948)
- Afrapix (1982–)
- Agence Centrale (1934–1935)
- Agence France–Presse (1985–)
- AGIP (1935–1992)
- Alliance Photo (1934–1940)
- Amazonas Images (1994–)
- Amber Film & Photography Collective (1968–)
- Angeli (1967–1987)
- Anglo–Continental Service (1934–1935)
- Aral Press Service (1934–1939)
- Associated Press (1936–)
- Bernand (1935–1973)
- Black Box (2006–)
- Black Star (1935–)
- Black Star France (1984–1985)
- Branger (1903–Vers 1934)
- Camerapix (1969–)
- C. L. Manuel frères (1904–1939/1940)
- Congopresse (1947–1968)
- Con Voz Propia
- Contact Press Image (1976–)
- Corona
- Cosmos (1979–2018)
- Dalmas (1955–1972)
- Demotix
- Dephot (Deutscher Photodienst) (1928–)
- Diimex
- DNP (1939–1944)
- Dorland
- Drik Picture Library (1989–)
- Ecce Photo (1929–1937)
- Éclair Mondial (1941–1959)
- Editing (1988–2007)
- EFE (1939–)
- Ekalokam Trust for Photography (2016–)
- Enguerrand (1972–2007)
- European Pressphoto Agency (1985–)
- Eve Photographers (2005–)
- F4 (1979–)
- Fama (1941–1948)
- Farm Security 1935–1944
- Format
- Fotoarchiv Blaschka (1950–1966)
- Fotogram (1963–1993)
- Fotolib (1973–1978)
- France–Presse Voir (1933–1944)
- Fulgur (1933–1948)
- Full Hand
- Gallia–Presse (1942–1944)
- Gamma (1966–2010)
- General Photographic Agency (1880–1950)
- Hachette Filipacchi (2000–2007)
- Harlingue (1905–1964)
- Henri Manuel (1900–1946)
- Henri Manuel/Silvestre (1941–1946)
- Hikari Creative (2014–)
- Hollandse Hoogte (1985–2021)
- Hug Block (1934–1940)
- In-Public (2000–)
- Interpress (1933–1991)
- Invisible Borders Trans-African Photographers Organisation (2009–)
- Kamoinge Workshop (1963–)
- Keystone (1927–2005)
- L'Agence de presse (1944–)
- L'Œil public (1995–2010)
- La Compagnie des Reporters (1980–1986)
- LAPI (1938–1976)
- Le Groupe des XV (1946–1957)
- Le Rectangle (1937–1945)
- Les 30 x 40 (1952–1998)
- Les Photographes associés (1937–1938)
- Libération (1971–1973)
- Lutetia Press (1934–1939)
- M.33 (1993–)
- Magnum Photos (1947–)
- Magyar Foto (1945–1956)
- Many Australian Photographers (MAP) (2000–)
- Métis (1989–2004)
- Meurisse (1904–1937)
- Mondial–Photo–Presse (1931–1937)
- Myop (2005–)
- Nihon Kôbô (日本工房) (1933–1945)
- NOOR(2007–)
- Nora (1940–1943)
- Novosti Press (1961–1991)
- Observe (2013–)
- Oculi (2000–)
- Odyssey (1989–1991)
- Ostkreuz
- PAN
- Panos Pictures
- Photo Presse Libération (1944)
- Photo Rap (1924–1940)
- PIX Publishing (1935–1969)
- Polygoon (1930–)
- POOL (2008–)
- Presse-Photo (1926–1934)
- Prima Presse (1934–1948)
- Prime Collective (2011–)
- Publifoto
- Rapho (1933–2005)
- Rawiya (2009–)
- Record (1923–1962)
- Roger Viollet (1938–2014)
- Rol (1903–1940)
- Ruang MES 56 (2002–)
- Ruda (2018–)
- SAFARA (1941–1947)
- SAFRA (1937–1941)
- Samfoto (1976–2011)
- Schostal (1933–1940)
- Scottish Photographic Press
- Services d’Information de la France Combattante (SIFC) (1942–1944)
- Signatures (2008–)
- Sipa (1973–)
- Sovetskoe Foto (1926–1991)
- Sovfoto (1932–)
- Soyuz Foto (1931–c.1941)
- Światowid
- Sygma (1973–2010)
- Telegraph Agency of the Soviet Union TASS (1927–)
- The Light Collective (2014–)
- The Photographic Collective (2020–)
- Three Lions Inc.
- Thuma Collective (2017–)
- Tio fotografer (1958–)
- Top
- Topical (1903–1957)
- Trampus (1905–1948)
- Vandystadt (1977–2004)
- Vereinigung der Arbeiter-Fotografen (Association of Worker Photographers)
- VII (2001–)
- Visum (1975–2023)
- Viva (1972–1982)
- VIVO (1960–)
- VU (1985–)
- Webistan Photo (1992–)
- Wide World (1927–1942)
- Wildlight (1985–2013)
- Women Photograph (2017–)
- Women's Press Collective (WPC)
- Zander & Labisch

== See also ==
- Stock photography
- Stringer (journalism)
