= Herman Ullstein =

German Jewish publisher (1875–1943)

Hermann Ullstein (born July 6, 1875, in Berlin; died November 22, 1943, in New York City) was a German Jewish publisher.

== Life ==
After a commercial apprenticeship with a grain export company in Russia, Ullstein, youngest son of Leopold Ullstein (1826-1899), joined the family business Ullstein Verlag in 1902 and devoted himself to expanding the magazine and book department. After the death of his father, Ullstein ran the publishing house together with his four brothers, Hans (1859–1935), Louis (1863–1933), Franz (1868–1945) and Rudolf (1873–1964). Ullstein acquired several fashion magazines and encouraged the founding of the magazines "Die Dame" and "Uhu". When the company was converted into a public limited company in 1921, he became a member of the board and deputy chairman of the board. He joined the Society of Friends as early as 1911.

In 1908, Hermann Ullstein's country house at Taunusstraße 7 in Berlin-Grunewald was completed by the Joseph Fränkel building company according to the plans of the architect Fritz Behrendt (1877-1941 or -1967).

When the Nazis came to power in 1933, the Ullstein family was persecuted because of their Jewish heritage. Ullstein Verlag was "Aryanised" in 1934, that is, forcibly transferred to a non-Jewish owner. The company was renamed Deutscher Verlag in 1937 and affiliated with the NSDAP's central publishing house. Ullstein sought refuge in the USA in 1939 in New York City. In 1943, Ullstein wrote about Hitler's destruction of his family's publishing house.

In 1952, the company was returned to the Ullstein family. Frederick Ullstein, Hermann Ullstein's son, took over the book business and managed the publishing house until 1959. In 1956 Axel Springer acquired a 26% stake in the publishing house, which he increased to 83% in 1960, and later to 100%, making Ullstein Verlag an integral part of Springer Verlag. In 2003, the Ullstein Group was sold to the Swedish media group Bonnier and continued to operate under the name Ullstein-Buchverlage in Berlin. The newspaper publishing house founded by Leopold Ullstein remained with Springer.

Ullstein died in New York City in 1943.

== Publications ==
- Wirb und werde! Ein Lehrbuch der Reklame, Francke, Bern 1935
- The Rise and Fall of the House of Ullstein. Simon and Schuster, New York 1943.
  - Das Haus Ullstein. Übersetzung von Geoffrey Layton. Mit einem Nachwort von Martin Münzel. Ullstein Buchverlage, Berlin 2013, ISBN 978-3550-08046-3. Auszüge

== Literature ==
- Ullstein, Hermann, in: Joseph Walk (Hrsg.): Kurzbiographien zur Geschichte der Juden 1918–1945. München : Saur, 1988, ISBN 3-598-10477-4, S. 370
- Ullstein, Hermann, in: Werner Röder, Herbert A. Strauss (Hrsg.): Biographisches Handbuch der deutschsprachigen Emigration nach 1933. Band 1: Politik, Wirtschaft, Öffentliches Leben. München : Saur, 1980, S. 775
- Ullstein, Hermann. In: Ernst Fischer: Verleger, Buchhändler & Antiquare aus Deutschland und Österreich in der Emigration nach 1933: Ein biographisches Handbuch. 2. Auflage. Berlin : De Gruyter, 2020, S. 524
