= Tzul =

Tzul is a surname. Notable people with the surname include:

- Georgius Tzul, Khazar warlord
- Gladys Tzul Tzul (born 1982), Maya K'iche' activist
