= Leopold Ullstein =

German newspaper publisher (1826–1899)

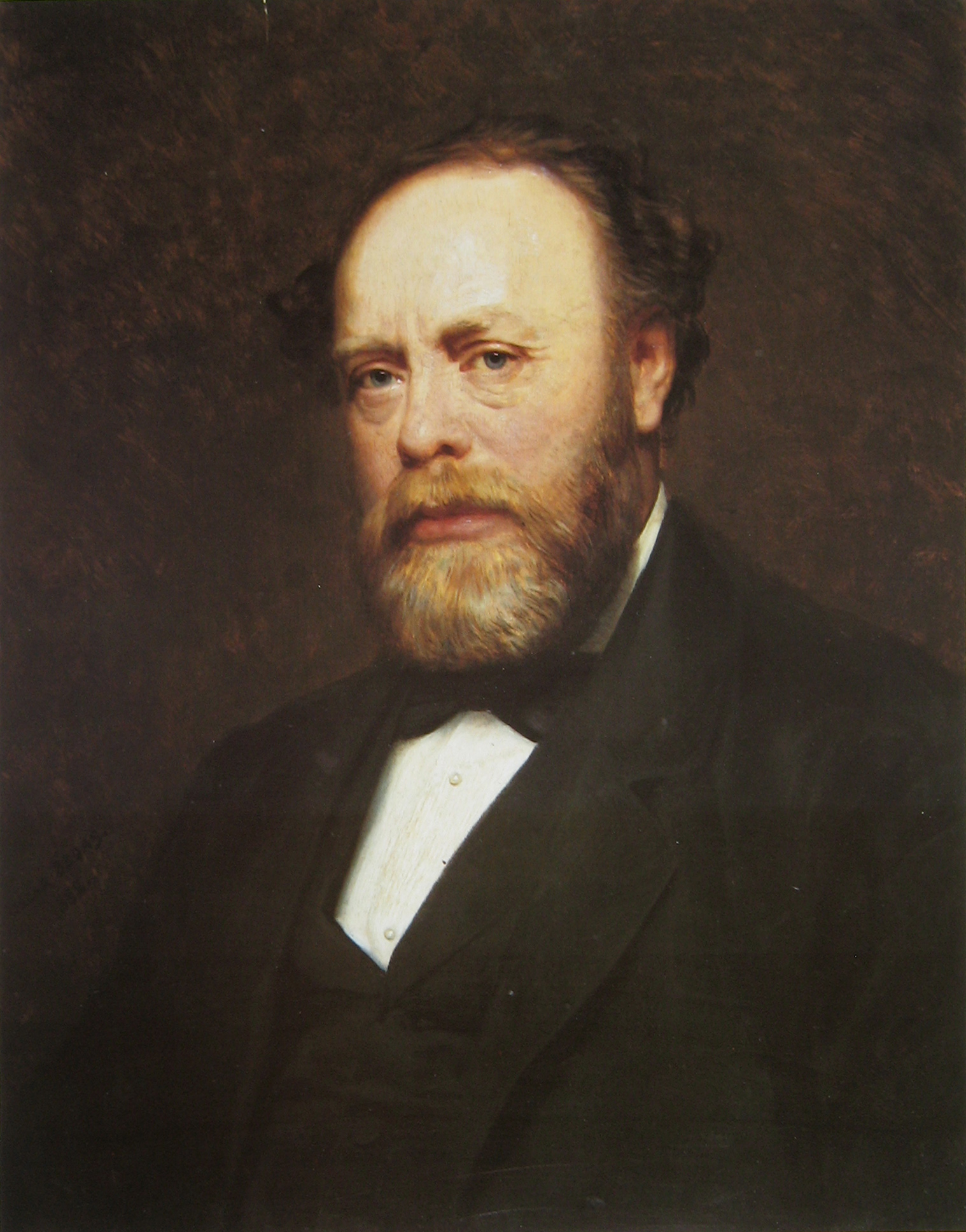
- Ullstein, painted by Oskar Begas in 1882
- Born: 6 September 1826; Fürth
- Died: 4 December 1899 (aged 73); Berlin
- Occupation: Publisher
- Known for: founding the Ullstein Verlag

Leopold Ullstein (6 September 1826 – 4 December 1899) was the founder and publisher of several successful German language newspapers, including B.Z. am Mittag and Berliner Morgenpost. Many of these are still published today. Ullstein was also the founder of the leading German publishing house Ullstein-Verlag.

== Biography ==
=== Early years ===
Leopold Ullstein was born 6 September 1826 in Fürth, Bavaria, of ethnic Jewish parents.

=== Publishing dynasty ===
Ullstein company was a major publisher in Germany.

All five of Ullstein's sons entered the family firm. Hans (1859–1935) was legal advisor. Louis (1863–1933) took over as CEO after his father's death. Franz (1868–1945) was the editorial director. Rudolf (1873–1964) became technical director and Hermann (1875–1943) managed the magazine and book departments. The Encyclopedia described some of the sons' contributions to the family publishing empire:

In 1887 Louis Ullstein founded the Berliner Abendpost; in 1898 the three eldest sons founded the Berliner Morgenpost and raised its circulation to 600,000, the largest of any German daily. They made the Berliner Zeitung am Mittag the first German newspaper to be sold by street vendors instead of by subscription. They also produced a series of other newspapers, including the Berliner Allgemeine Zeitung, the Montagspost, the Vossische Zeitung, and Tempo. In addition, the Ullsteins had their own picture and news services, radio equipment, music division, dress pattern division, movie studios, and even a zoo to serve one of their children's papers. The other major ventures of the Ullstein company were its book publishing house (Ullstein, renamed Propylaeen in 1919) and magazine empire. They published the Berliner Illustrierte Zeitung, a new type of paper with many illustrations, photographs and drawings, from 1894 with a circulation of two million. In 1919 the Ullsteins began publishing on a large scale, producing many other magazines on the sciences, the arts and literature, broadcasting, automobiles, and aviation.

Leopold Ullstein died 4 December 1899. He was 73 years old at the time of his death.

== Nazi persecution ==
Following the rise of Adolf Hitler and the Nazi Party in 1933, the Ullstein publishing empire was forcibly "Aryanized". In 1934 the firm, valued at 60 million marks, was sold under duress for 6 million marks.

One of the sons, Hermann Ullstein, emigrated from Nazi Germany in December 1938 and published a history of the Ullstein firm. Another son, Franz Ullstein, fled to the United States where he continued the publishing firm.
