= Prime Collective =

Photojournalism and photography organization

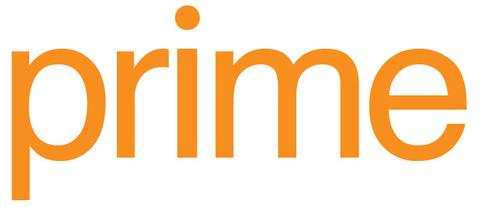
- Company type: Cooperative
- Industry: Photography
- Founded: 2011
- Founders: Dominic Bracco II, Melanie Burford, Brendan Hoffman, Charlie Mahoney, Lance Rosenfield, Max Whittaker
- Area served: Worldwide
- Products: Photojournalism, photo agency
- Website: www.primecollective.com

Prime Collective is an international cooperative of documentary and news photographers, filmmakers, and visual artists focused primarily on social and environmental justice issues including conflict, violence, gender, and climate change. It was founded in 2011 with the initial goal of providing professional support and guidance for its members in the challenging freelance photography market.

Prime’s member photographers are based around the world and known for their collaborations with major media organizations including National Geographic Magazine, The New York Times, The New Yorker, The Washington Post, Smithsonian Magazine, and Harper’s Magazine, and photography awards from organizations such as World Press Photo, Pictures of the Year International, and the Pulitzer Prize.

== Photographers ==
Prime currently counts the following seven photographers as members:

- Luján Agusti (based in Ushuaia, Argentina)
- Dominic Bracco II (based in Mexico City)
- Melanie Burford (based in Bergen, Norway)
- Brendan Hoffman (based in Kyiv, Ukraine)
- Pete Muller (based in Nairobi, Kenya)
- Katie Orlinsky (based in New York City)
- Max Whittaker (based in Sacramento, California)

== Activities ==
Prime has primarily been active participating in or helping to organize several photography festivals. In 2011 and 2013, it held informal exhibition events in connection with the Look3 Festival of the Photograph in Charlottesville, Virginia. In 2014, Prime was a co-organizer of the Oso Bay Biennial at Texas A&M University–Corpus Christi. In 2016, member photographers offered portfolio reviews and a workshop at San José Foto, a festival in San José de Mayo, Uruguay, a festival that was founded and directed at the time by then-member Christian Rodriguez.
