= Ullstein Verlag =

German publishing company

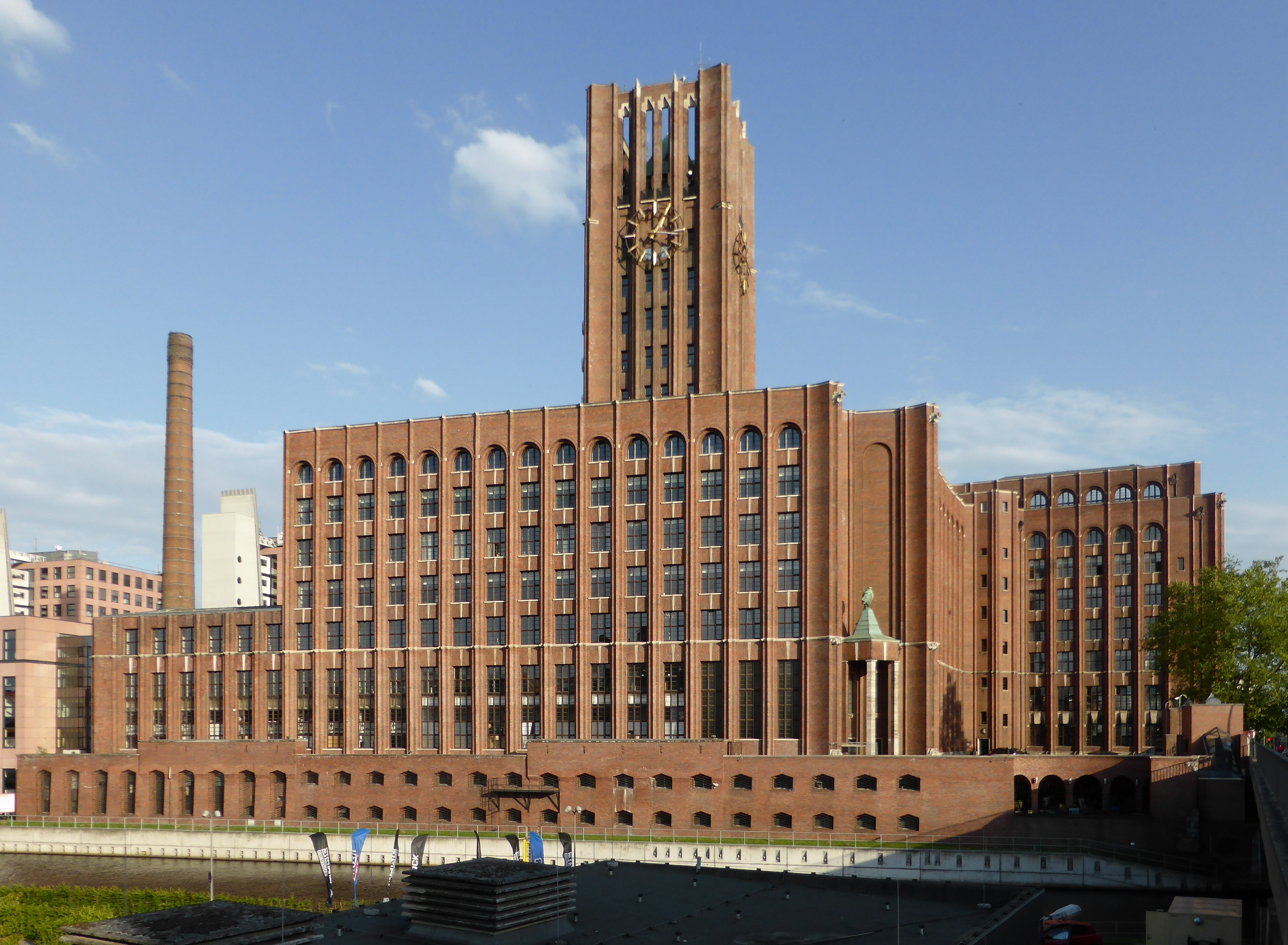
- Ullsteinhaus, Berlin-Tempelhof
- Parent company: Bonnier
- Founded: 1877; 149 years ago
- Founder: Leopold Ullstein
- Country of origin: Germany
- Publication types: Books
- Official website: www.ullstein-buchverlage.de

The Ullstein Verlag was founded by Leopold Ullstein in 1877 in Berlin, and became one of the largest publishing companies of Germany. It published newspapers such as B.Z. and Berliner Morgenpost and books through its subsidiaries Ullstein Buchverlage and Propyläen.

== History ==
=== Founding to World War II ===
On 14 July 1877, Leopold Ullstein purchased the Neue Berliner Tageblatt newspaper, a subsidiary of the liberal Berliner Tageblatt published by Rudolf Mosse, and on 1 January 1878 converted it into the Berliner Zeitung (B.Z.). In 1894 he also acquired the Berliner Illustrirte Zeitung weekly, which as technology advanced and permitted heavy use of photographs, became the most successful picture paper in Germany. The B.Z. am Mittag, relaunched in 1904, became Germany's first tabloid newspaper. Ullstein's sons Rudolf, Hans, Louis, Franz and Hermann inherited the publishing house and developed it further.

They acquired the reputable Vossische Zeitung, a liberal newspaper with a tradition dating back to 1617, while the left-wing Berliner Morgenpost established in 1898 reached a high number of subscribers.

From 1927, Ullstein also published Die Grüne Post weekly newspaper under chief editor Ehm Welk.

In 1919, the Propyläen Verlag (cf. Propylaea) was founded as an imprint for non-fiction books especially on history and art history as well as classical editions, but also for novels like Erich Maria Remarque's All Quiet on the Western Front first published in 1929. The number of authors working for Ullstein also included Vicki Baum, Thea von Harbou, and Franz Blei.

Between 1925 and 1927, the Ullstein Verlag had the new Ullsteinhaus print building erected in Berlin-Tempelhof, with a height of 76 m (249 ft) a "Brick Expressionist" landmark with a bronze sculpture of the "Ullstein Owl" by Fritz Klimsch.

=== Nazi Aryanization ===
Under the Ullstein family, the publishing house became the biggest in Europe. In 1933, when the Nazis came to power, the Ullstein brothers were publishing four daily newspapers as well as numerous magazines.

In 1934, the Jewish Ullstein family was seized by the Nazi authorities and their entire publishing enterprise forcibly "aryanized", with the business, valued at 60 million marks, sold under duress for 6 million. In 1937, Ullstein Verlag was renamed Deutscher Verlag, affiliated with the Franz Eher Nachfolger publishing house of the Nazi Party and editing the Deutsche Allgemeine Zeitung, as well as Das Reich and the Signal magazine from 1940 until the end of World War II.

=== Post-war developments ===
After the war the publishing house was restored to the Ullstein family, but soon came into financial problems. In 1956 a share of 26% was purchased by Axel Springer, becoming majority shareholder by 1960. Under Springer the remaining West Berlin newspapers Berliner Morgenpost and B.Z. shifted towards a right-wing alignment with a distinct anti-communist stance. The Aryanization of the Ullstein Verlag was played down.

The newspaper publishing branch was taken over by Axel Springer AG in 1956.

ullstein bild, a brand for the photo collection since 1877, is now under Axel Springer Syndication GmbH.

In spring 2017, Ullstein launched another imprint: Ullstein Five. The focus is on socially relevant yet accessible stories by German authors. The name is reminiscent of an Ullstein tradition: in the founding years of the publishing house, each of the five Ullstein brothers contributed according to their talents. Following the example of the five brothers, the program is designed across departments and together with the authors.

=== Sale of company ===
The Ullstein book-publishing house was sold to Random House in 2003. The sale, which was subject to the agreement of the Bundeskartellamt (German Federal Cartel Office), was only approved in part. The Heyne, Südwest and Diana publishing houses became part of Random House, and the remainder of the Ullstein group (Ullstein, Claassen, Econ, List, Marion von Schröder und Propyläen) was sold on to the Bonnier Group.

== See also ==
- Max Amann
- Aryanization
- Panzerbär
