= B.Z. (newspaper) =

German newspaper

- The 30 January 2011 front page of B.Z. (Sunday edition)
- Type: Daily newspaper
- Format: Tabloid
- Owner(s): Ullstein-Verlag (wholly owned subsidiary of Axel Springer AG)
- Editor: Peter Huth
- Founded: 1877
- Headquarters: Berlin, Germany
- Website: bz-berlin.de

B.Z. is a German tabloid newspaper published in Berlin by Ullstein-Verlag, a subsidiary of Axel Springer AG. As of 2010, it has a circulation of around 200,000.

B.Z. is not to be confused with the Berliner Zeitung, which has been published since 1945 and is often also informally known as B.Z. in the former East Germany, or with the evening tabloid formerly known as BZ am Abend, now the Berliner Kurier.

== History of the newspaper ==
The newspaper was founded under the name Berliner Zeitung on 1 October 1877 by German journalist Peter Langmann, and was abbreviated to B.Z. and purchased by Leopold Ullstein the following year. In 1904 it was remodelled as B.Z. am Mittag, and it was emphasized that it was a daily newspaper. During the Second World War it was discontinued, and the parent company Ullstein-Vermögen was expropriated by the Nazis; B.Z. did not reappear until 19 November 1953.

Since taking over Ullstein-Verlag in 1960, B.Z. is, like Bild and Die Welt, ultimately owned by the Axel Springer company and adheres to its political remit. In 2006 Axel Springer outsourced the newspaper to a company of its own, B.Z.-Ullstein, in order to increase profitability in the highly competitive Berlin market. The outsourcing entailed a move of the paper's editorial headquarters from Springer-Haus in Kreuzberg to the Kurfürstendamm. A special sports edition of the paper, Sport-B.Z., was introduced for the 2006 FIFA World Cup and distributed from August of that year with a circulation of 50,000, but was discontinued on 22 December 2006.

Since 1991, B.Z. has awarded an annual cultural prize, the Berliner Bär.

== Editors-in-chief ==
- 1904 until 1909: Wilhelm Auspitzer
- 1909 until 1925: Max Wolf
- 1925 until 1926: Ernst Wallenberg
- 1926 until 1931: Franz Höllering
- November 1953 until November 1960: Karl-Heinz Hagen
- December 1960 until September 1973: Malte-Till Kogge
- October 1973 until July 1991: Wilhelm Pannier
- August 1991 until July 1992: Claus Larass (second editor-in-chief 1991/92: Kai Diekmann)
- August 1992 until September 1996: Wolfgang Kryszohn
- October 1996 until June 1998: Manfred von Thien
- July 1998 until December 2000: Franz Josef Wagner
- January 2001 until July 2003: Georg Gafron
- August 2003 until October 2004: Florian von Heintze
- November 2004 until July 2008: Walter Mayer
- August 2008 until January 2017: Peter Huth
- February 2017 until 2022: Miriam Krekel
- since 2022: Jan Schilde
