= Observe (collective) =

Photography group

Observe is an international collective of street photographers. Established in June 2013, the collective consists of 13 members located in 10 different countries. The collective is notable for its wide-ranging activities to support the international street photography community through a variety of activities, including the organization of street photography festivals and exhibitions, showcasing of other photographers through its social media platforms, the publication of street photography magazines and collections, and the operation of Flickr-based competition and critique communities. Although mainly focusing on street photography, it is not limited to one specific genre and its members explore various genres and methods of photographic practice. It was presented as the featured collective at the 2014 Miami Street Photography Festival and has subsequently participated in street photography festivals and exhibitions in Europe, Asia, Australia and North America.

== History and Exhibitions ==
Observe was established in June 2013 by photographers who had participated in the online Street Photography Now project, as well as other online street photography-focused critique communities. In 2014, the collective was featured at the Miami Street Photography Festival, where members Chris Farling and Danielle Houghton served on the competition jury.

The collective held its first group exhibition at the Städtische Galerie Iserlohn in 2015. The exhibition presented approximately 100 works and was accompanied by the international Under Construction competition, whose shortlisted entries were curated by Observe Collective members and were shown in a separate exhibition. Independent local reporting subsequently recorded more than 1,500 visitors to the collective’s exhibition.

In 2017, the gallery and collective cooperated to organize Observations 2017, described as Iserlohn’s first international street photography festival. The event presented more than 400 images at seven venues, including exhibitions of invited photographers, students and photography collectives. A second international festival of the same name was held in 2022, with more than 350 images exhibited at five locations.

== Street Fight! ==
Observe operates Street Fight! as an open street photography competition and critique platform. Street Photography Magazine identified Street Fight! and the related Street & Repeat group as forums through which the collective encouraged discussion and critique among photographers.

In collaboration with Eyeshot, the collective produced Street Fight #9, a limited-edition publication featuring selected photographers from the competition. Eyeshot states that copies were reserved for Observations 2022, where a selection of the work was exhibited.

== Publications ==
=== Published by Observe ===
- Street Fight!. Various photographers. Eds. Chris Farling, Tom Young (Observe Collective) and Marco Savarese. Eyeshot, 2022.

=== Monographs and Collections featuring Observe members ===
- 100 Great Street Photographs. Ed. David Gibson. Prestel, 2017. ISBN 978-3791383132.
- Kristin van den Eede - A Limit to the Dark. Kristin van den Eede. Bump Books, 2021.
- Tierra Santa. Guille Ibanez. Eyeshot, 2024.
- David Horton - World in Color. David Horton. Bump Books, 2025.
- Ilya Shtutsa - St. Petersburg. Ilya Shtutsa. Bump Books, 2025.
- Chris Farling - New York Subway 2011-2018. Chris Farling. Bump Books, 2026.
- Guille Ibanez - England's Dreaming. Guille Ibanez. Bump Books, 2026.
