= Brendan Hoffman =

American photographer

- Born: Brendan Hoffman; 1980 (age 45–46); Albany, New York, U.S.
- Occupations: Photographer, journalist, artist

Brendan Hoffman (born 1980) is an American documentary photographer based in Kyiv, Ukraine. He is a founding member of the photographic collective, Prime.

Hoffman is a contributing photographer to National Geographic magazine, The New York Times, and other leading publications. He is largely known for his coverage of the crisis in Ukraine, including the Maidan protests and war in eastern Ukraine.

== Life and work ==
Hoffman graduated from the College of William & Mary in Virginia in 2002 with a bachelor's degree in art and art history. He began his photography career in 2006 while based in Washington, D.C., covering the White House and United States Congress as well as various political campaigns, especially the 2008 and 2012 presidential campaigns in Iowa.

He photographed the aftermath of the 2010 Haiti earthquake, traveling there aboard the USNS Comfort, for which he received an award from the White House News Photographers Association.

In 2013, Hoffman moved to Moscow, Russia. He began working in Ukraine in late 2013 during the Revolution of Dignity, and covered the protests for Getty Images until their conclusion with the removal of then-president Viktor Yanukovych in February 2014. His work was widely published and won several awards, including from the White House News Photographers Association, and was exhibited at the Zoom Photo Festival Saguenay in Canada and the Singapore International Photography Festival. He began working in the Donbas region of eastern Ukraine in April 2014 as war broke out, and relocated from Moscow to Kyiv later that spring. Much of his coverage of the war in Ukraine has been done for The New York Times, though he has also worked with Getty Images, The Washington Post, Los Angeles Times, Newsweek, USA Today, NPR, Al Jazeera, and other media outlets.

His coverage has included many of the major events of the war, including the shooting down of Malaysia Airlines Flight 17, the first and Second Battle of Donetsk Airport, and the Battle of Debaltseve.

Since 2018, his work from eastern Ukraine has been exhibited in a number of Ukrainian cities, including Mariupol, Sumy, Kyiv, Ivano-Frankivsk, Zaporizhia, and Kryvyi Rih. The Ukrainian Institute of Modern Art in Chicago featured the work in a solo exhibition in 2019. The exhibition has included, in addition to photographs, several 360 videos and a self-published newspaper titled Ukraine in a Time of War, which was also distributed free to public libraries around Ukraine.

Hoffman has done several features for National Geographic in Ukraine, on illegal amber mining, the Malanka festival, and the split of the Orthodox Church of Ukraine from the Russian Orthodox Church.

Since 2011, Hoffman has photographed the community of Webster City, Iowa, for which he has received several grants. It was the subject of his 2017 zine Great Old Days, published in conjunction with Overlapse.

His first feature story for National Geographic, on the Indus River, is due for publication in July 2020.

== Awards ==
- 2019: Magnum Foundation Fund grant recipient, for continuing work in Webster City, Iowa
- 2018-19: Fulbright Scholar (Ukraine)
- 2018: Philip Jones Griffiths Award, for his work covering the war in eastern Ukraine
- 2017: Yunghi Grant winner, for continuing work in Webster City, Iowa
- 2017: Bemis Center for Contemporary Arts, Artist-in-Residence
- 2017: TheDocumentaryProjectFund Established Artist Grant Winner, for his work in eastern Ukraine
- 2016: Alexia Foundation Professional Grant Finalist, for his work in eastern Ukraine
- 2015: National Press Photographers Association Short Grant Winner, for his work in eastern Ukraine
