= Topical Press Agency =

The Topical Press Photographic Agency, also known as Topical Press Agency, or simply Topical, was a British photo agency established in 1903 and dissolved in 1957.

== History ==
It was founded in 1903 in London as a partnership between James Barrow Helsby (1862- 14 December 1943), a step-brother of the Royal photographer Albert Victor Swaebe (1877- 3 August 1967) and photographer himself, and Walter James Edwards (d. 1929), a traveling salesman. By its peak in 1929, it employed almost 1,500 representatives in Great Britain and worldwide, selling the work of a team of photographers operating first from Fleet Street and then at Red Lion Court in London. As well as contemporary press photography, the company also focused on sales of stock photography. With changing patterns in news publishing, the company dwindled until it eventually went bankrupt in 1957, with the bulk of the archives acquired by the Hulton Picture Library, now part of Getty Images.

Prominent photographers worked for Topical including Arthur William Debenham, Hugh Cecil Saunders, and John Warwick Brooke, who was one of the first official British photographers of the First World War, among others.

Images by Topical Press Agency

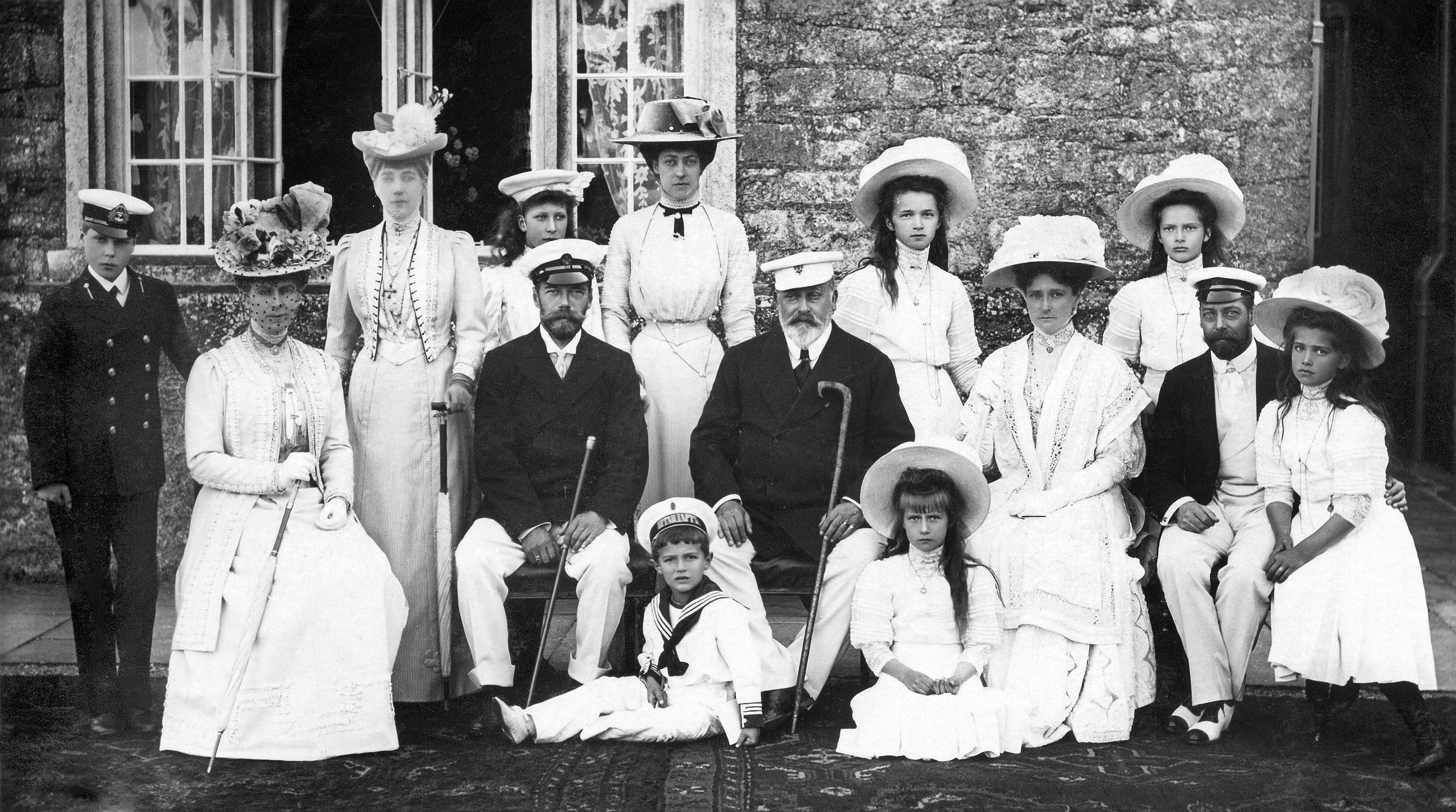
The Royal Gathering at Osborne, 1909

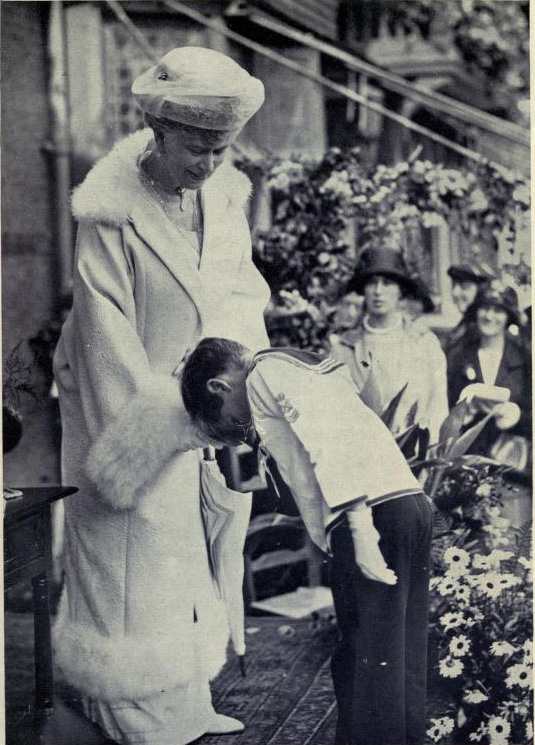
Queen Mary, 1924

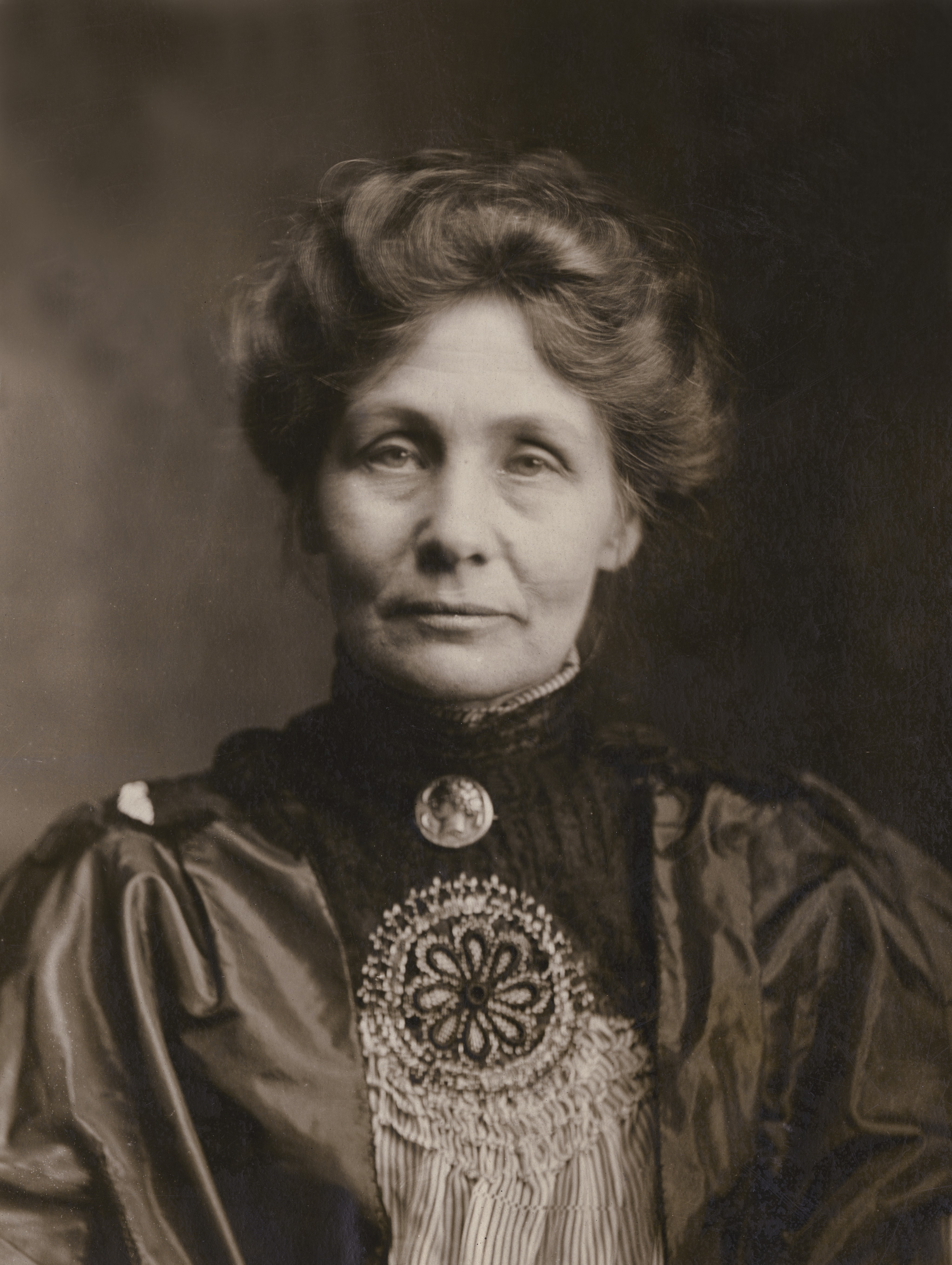
Emmeline Pankhurst, c.1910

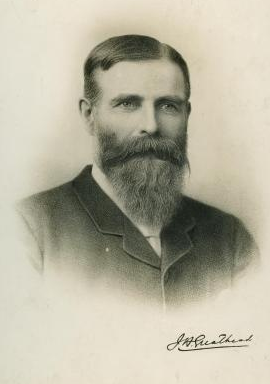
James Henry Greathead

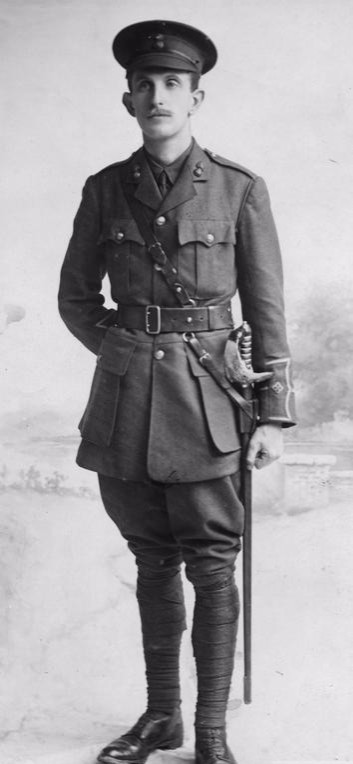
William Glynne Charles Gladstone

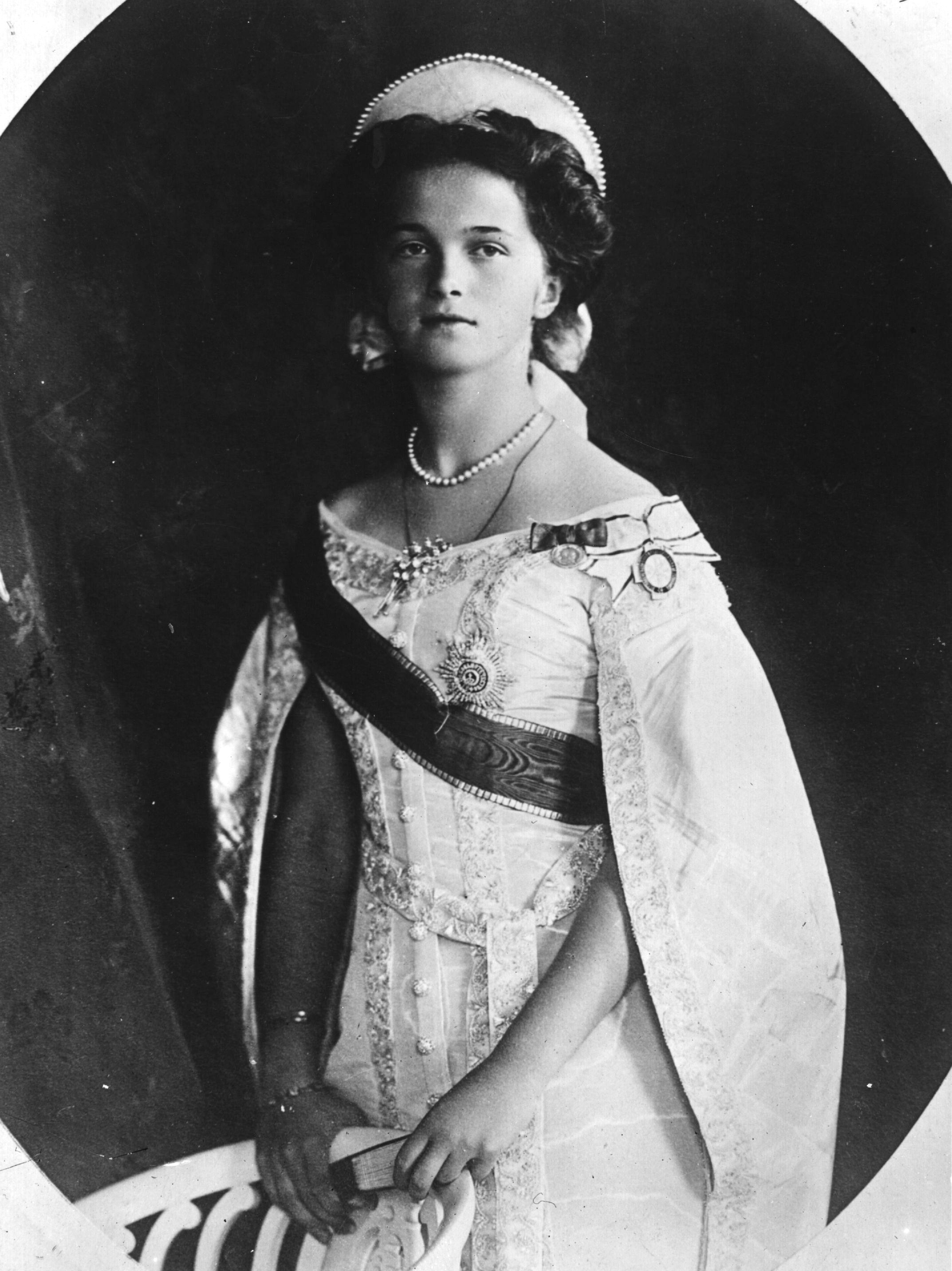
Grand Duchess Olga

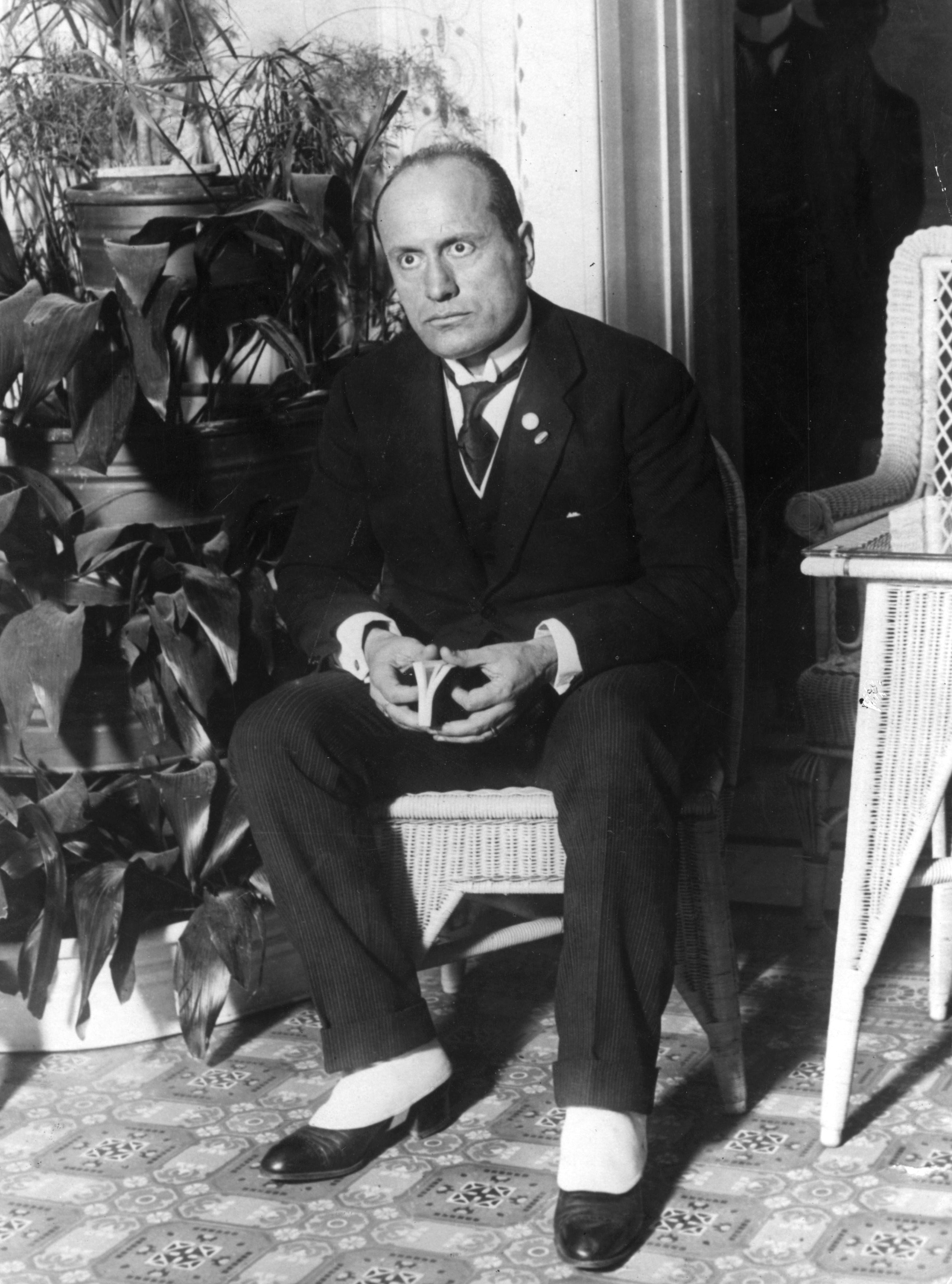
Benito Mussolini, 1922
