= Yu Yu Myint Than =

21st-century Burmese photographer

- ယုယုမြင့်သန်း
- Born: January 18, 1984 (age 42); Yangon, Myanmar
- Occupation: Documentary photographer
- Known for: Magnum Foundation Fellowship (2017–18); co-founded the Thuma Collective; managed Myanmar Deitta

Yu Yu Myint Than is a documentary photographer from Myanmar. She is the manager of the non-profit organization Myanmar Deitta, a gallery that promotes local artistic and documentary photographers, filmmakers and multimedia producers. Over the course of her career she has won scholarships and awards from Bali, South Korea, Malaysia, Yangon, Bangkok, New York and Cambodia. In 2018 Yu Yu co-founded the Thuma Collective, an organization that seeks to expand the ability of female visual artists from Myanmar to express themselves and develop professionally. Much of her work explores religious and women's issues.

== Early life ==
Yu Yu Myint Than became interested in photography in 2009 while studying for an education degree in Hong Kong. After returning to Myanmar she began to attend photography workshops and eventually looked for work as a professional photographer.

== Career ==
In 2014 Yu Yu won a place in a three-month photography workshop on Meiktila. The work she produced during the workshop focused on positive connections between Buddhist and Muslim residents.

Later in 2014 Yu Yu quit her job as a teacher trainer and began working as a photojournalist for the Yangon-based newspaper Myanmar Times. She began taking commissioned and personal photography projects and managed "Myanmar's most active photography gallery", Myanmar Deitta. Deitta is a Pali word meaning "in front of one's eyes". It is a non-profit organization whose goal is to promote local documentary photographers, filmmakers and multimedia artists. Much of her subsequent work highlighted women and religion. In December 2018 Yu Yu headed Myanmar Deitta's education department, with responsibility for workshops and seminars. She has been featured in numerous articles about her work.

In 2015, Yu Yu won the Golden Scarf Award, an annual award given to the photographer "whose work, attitude, and diligence most exemplifies the Foundry spirit." At the time she was believed to be the only native female professional photographer working in Myanmar.

On October 15, 2017, Yu Yu co-founded the Thuma Collective at Myanmar Deitta, a photography collective composed of five Myanmar female photographers. The name of the collective was chosen because thuma is Burmese for "she". The collective's mission statement is “to promote the practice of visual storytelling, to amplify voices through the eyes of women and to inspire and encourage women who are interested in photography to use it as a language to tell stories and engage with their world.” The photography industry in Myanmar is overwhelmingly populated by men.

From October 19 – November 4, 2017 Yu Yu held an exhibition at Myanmar Deitta focusing on the experiences of San Kay Khine, a girl from State Counselor Aung San Suu Kyi's constituency of Kawmhu. San Kay Khine had been held against her will in a well-known tailor's shop in Yangon, forced to work without pay, and tortured. She was rescued in 2016. Rather than focusing on the girl's physical scars, like most media photographers, Yu Yu traveled to Khine's hometown to take a series of pictures depicting her "memories, traumas, longings, and dreams".

Yu Yu has claimed that the greatest challenges to her work were the lack of investment in artistic photography prior to the Saffron Revolution in 2007 and the discrimination against women in Myanmar. She is involved in a long-term personal project investigating human trafficking that occurs between Myanmar and China.

Yu Yu has won scholarships and awards from Bali, South Korea, Malaysia, Yangon, Bangkok, New York, and Cambodia. In 2017 she became a fellow of the Magnum Foundation's Photography and Social Justice Program. In 2018 she was the first person to receive the Angus McDonald Photography Scholarship, a collaboration between Myanmar Deitta and the International Photography Division of the Pathshala South Asian Media Institute. The scholarship funded her studies for six months in Dhaka, Bangladesh. Following her return to Yangon she led workshops on documentary photography.
