= Gladys Tzul Tzul =

Guatemalan scholar and activist

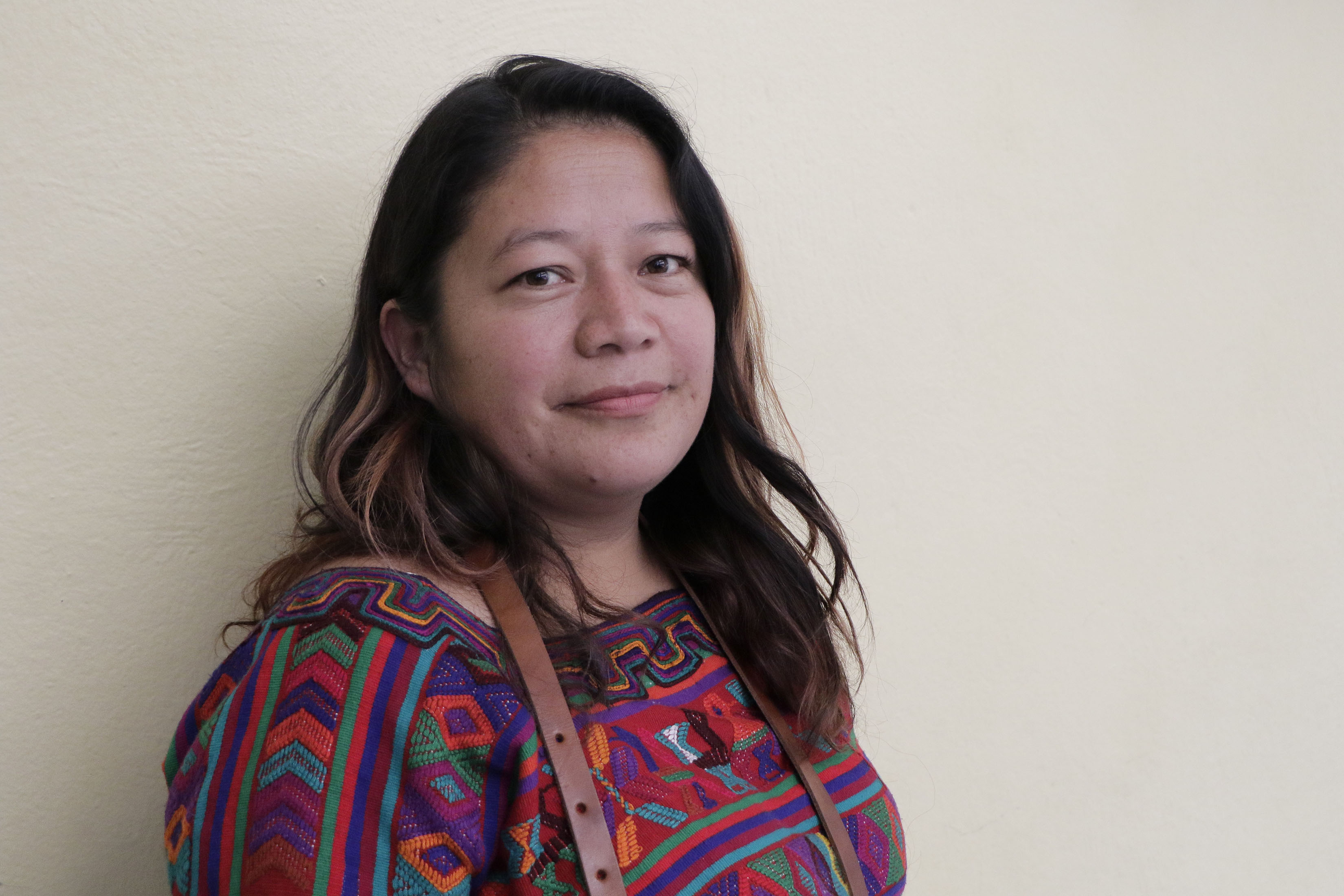
Gladys Tzul Tzul, at the fifth Festival of Indigenous Cultures, Peoples and Original Neighborhoods in Mexico City, 2018.

Gladys Elizabeth Tzul Tzul (born 1982) is a Maya K'iche' activist, public intellectual, sociologist, and visual artist who was one of the first to study Indigenous communal politics and gender relationships in Guatemala.

== Biography ==
Tzul Tzul was born in a small K'iche' community in Totonicapán. She is a descendant of Atanasio Tzul, a K'iche' leader who led an Indigenous revolution in 1820.

== Academics and activism ==
She earned a master's degree from the Alberto Hurtado University in Chile and a PhD in sociology from Benemérita Universidad Autónoma de Puebla in Mexico. Her scholarly work focuses on the relationships of Indigenous women within their communities and with larger political structures, such as federal governments. In many of her articles, Tzul Tzul describes how Indigenous women resist domination and exploitation through communal democracy in the Andes and Mesoamerica. Indigenous land ownership is also one of her key beliefs.

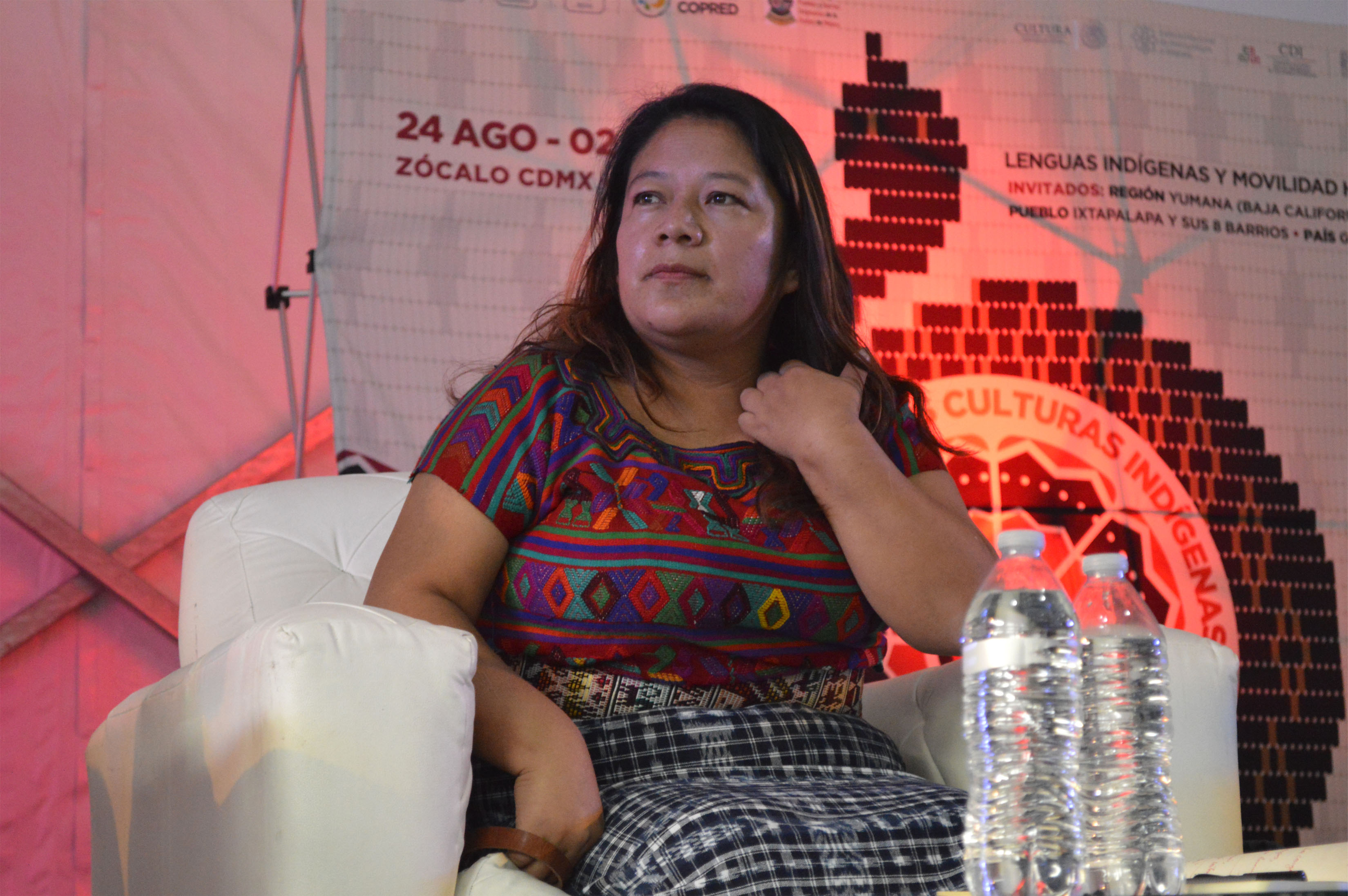
Gladys Tzul Tzul giving a talk in 2018 in Mexico City.

One of Tzul Tzul's case studies is the Ixcán highland village of Santa María Tzejá, an Indigenous community that was destroyed in 1982 as part of the ethnic cleansing of the Maya during the Guatemalan Civil War. As rebuilding efforts began in the 1990s, women in the village linked alcohol to increased violence and began to organize efforts to prohibit the sale of alcohol. Tzul Tzul describes the successful regulation of alcohol starting in 1994 and the accompanying decrease in domestic violence as a success of the "communal process of historical [and Indigenous] self-regulation," which could represent the intersectional concerns of Indigenous women in a way that federal governance could not.

A key part of her activism is the idea that individual Indigenous communities best understand their own needs. She is influenced by the work of Michel Foucault and Silvia Federici, and has argued that Indigenous communities can resist political domination through language and through their continued existence.

In 2012, Tzul Tzul faced persecution for her efforts to bring light to the massacre of Indigenous leaders; she was an expert witness in the 2016 trials that saw the exoneration of community leaders.

She has written that Indigenous communities have responded flexibly to the COVID-19 pandemic despite government neglect because of Indigenous authorities' use of native languages and support for communal markets.

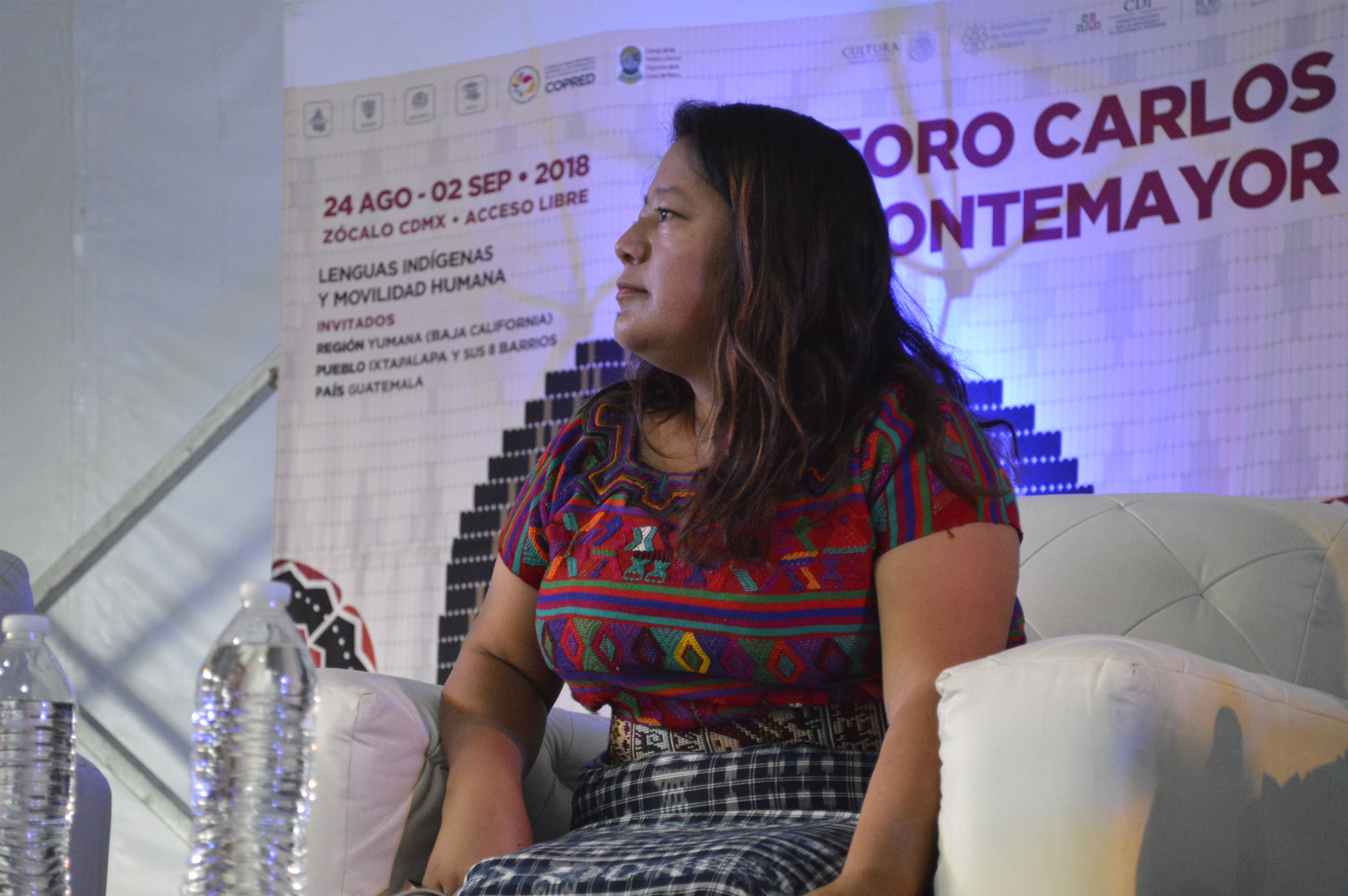
Gladys Tzul Tzul giving a talk in 2018 in Mexico City.

She is also the founder of Amaq', an organization that provides legal guidance to Indigenous peoples.

== Honors and awards ==
In 2017, she received the Berta Cáceres scholarship, named in honor of the Honduran Indigenous activist.

Tzul Tzul received the 2018 "Voltaire Prize for Tolerance, International Understanding and Respect for Difference" from the University of Potsdam in Germany.

== Visual arts ==
Tzul Tzul is a member of the Indigenous photographers' collective “Con Voz Propia" (English: "In Their Own Voices" or "In Her Own Voice"). The organization was established in response to federal programs to "liberate" Indigenous women; instead, Con Voz Propia empowers Indigenous women to represent themselves through photography.

== Books authored ==
- Sistemas de gobierno comunal indígena: Mujeres y tramas de parentesco en Chuimea'ena (Systems of Indigenous Communal Government: Women and Lineage in Chuimea'ena). Guatemala, Editorial Maya' Wuj and the Sociedad Comunitaria de Estudios Estratégicos / Tz'i'kin, Centro de Investigación y Pluralismo Jurídico, 2016.
- Gobierno comunal indígena y estado guatemalteco: Algunas claves críticas para comprender su tensa relación (Indigenous Communal Government and the Guatemalan State: Some Critical Perspectives to Understand their Tense Relationship). Guatemala: Instituto Amaq', 2018.
