= PanARMENIAN.Net =

- Abbreviation: PAN
- Established: April 2, 2000; 26 years ago
- Type: Corporate group
- Location(s): 9 Alek Manukyan St., AUA Business Center, II-308, Yerevan, Armenia
- Region served: Worldwide
- Services: News Agency, Photography, Photojournalism
- Official languages: Armenian, English, Russian
- Key people: Armen Azaryan (co-founder, CEO), Ara Aghamyan (co-founder), Vahan Stepanyan (PAN Photo Agency co-founder)
- Subsidiaries: PAN News Agency, PAN Photo Agency
- Website: panarmenian.net, pan.am/photo/
- Formerly called: PanARMENIAN Network

PanARMENIAN.net is the first Armenian online news agency, an internet portal based in Yerevan, Armenia. The PanARMENIAN.net information-analytical portal is one of the projects of the "PanArmenian Network" NGO. It was launched on April 2, 2000. PanARMENIAN.net provides information and analysis about the main events in the social and political life of Armenia, as well as events taking place all over the world that are connected with Armenia directly or indirectly. Topics covered: Politics, Armenia and the World, Society, Economics, Region, Sport, Culture, IT and Telecommunications.

PAN Photo Agency, established by PanARMENIAN Network in 2009 is a major news and creative photography agency in Armenia.

== News agency ==
PAN News Agency (formerly known as PanARMENIAN.net News Agency) was established in 2000 with a focus on Armenian Diaspora. Besides the own content produced by in-house journalists and editors, the news service of the PanARMENIAN.net uses the information flows of local and world news agencies.

PAN News agency content is being spread out via various social platforms, publishing partners and content aggregates.

PAN News Agency was a pioneering news organization in Armenia to use a Creative Commons license on all its content and also include new content types in the news stories (photo stories, infographics and editorial cartoons) The news agency publishes its content in three languages: Armenian, Russian and English.

Most of the users come from Armenia, the United States, Europe and Russia.

== Photo agency ==
PAN Photo Agency (formerly known as PanARMENIAN Photo) was established in 2009. It quickly became one of the major independent news and creative photography agencies in Armenia. The agency covers major social-political, business, cultural and sporting events happening in the country and presents reports from all around the world via its international photographers and partners. PAN Photo cooperates with and provides photo wire for major international photo agencies such as Associated Press (AP), Agence France Press (AFP), Reuters, RIA Novosti, Itar-Tass, European Pressphoto Agency and others.

PAN Photo images have been featured in numerous international media outlets including The New York Times, CNN.com, BBC, The Wall Street Journal, Al Jazeera America, Libération, San Francisco Chronicle, Washington Post, The Guardian, Vogue, Esquire and others.

== Publications ==
- "12 Days of Fest de Cannes" photo album, 2011
- "From disaster relief to risk reduction" – Photography workshops for children in Armenian regions was concluded in a photo stories book commissioned by UNDP, 2012
- "99" book dedicated to the Armenian genocide, 2014, which contains important facts about the 1915 events.

== See also ==
- Media in Armenia
