= Berliner Morgenpost =

German newspaper

- The 29 January 2011 front page
- Type: Daily newspaper
- Format: Broadsheet
- Owner: Funke Mediengruppe
- Editor: Peter Schink
- Founded: 1898; 128 years ago
- Headquarters: Berlin, Germany
- Website: www.morgenpost.de

Berliner Morgenpost is a German newspaper, based and mainly read in Berlin, where it is one of the most read daily newspapers.

== History and profile ==
Founded in 1898 by Leopold Ullstein, the paper was taken over by Axel Springer AG in 1959 and sold to Funke Mediengruppe in 2013. In 2009, it had a circulation of 145,556 and an estimated 322,000 readers. Since May 2015 the non-regional sections of the newspaper have been produced by the Funke group's central newsroom also in Berlin. In 2016 a tabloid version of the Morgenpost was launched.

The editor-in-chief is Peter Schink.

In 2012, it was awarded the European Newspaper of the Year in the regional newspaper category by the European Newspapers Congress.

== Editors-in-chief ==
- 1952–1953: Wilhelm Schulze
- 1953–1959: Helmut Meyer-Dietrich
- 1960–1972: Heinz Köster
- 1973–1976: Walter Brückmann
- 1976–1978: Hans-Werner Marquardt
- 1978–1981: Wolfgang Kryszohn
- 1981–1987: Johannes Otto
- 1988–1996: Bruno Waltert
- 1996–1999: Peter Philipps
- 1999–2002: Herbert Wessels
- 2002: Wolfram Weimer
- 2003–2004: Jan-Eric Peters
- 2004–2018: Carsten Erdmann
- 2018–2023: Christine Richter
- 2024–present Peter Schink
