= Franz Ullstein =

German Jewish publisher (1868–1945)

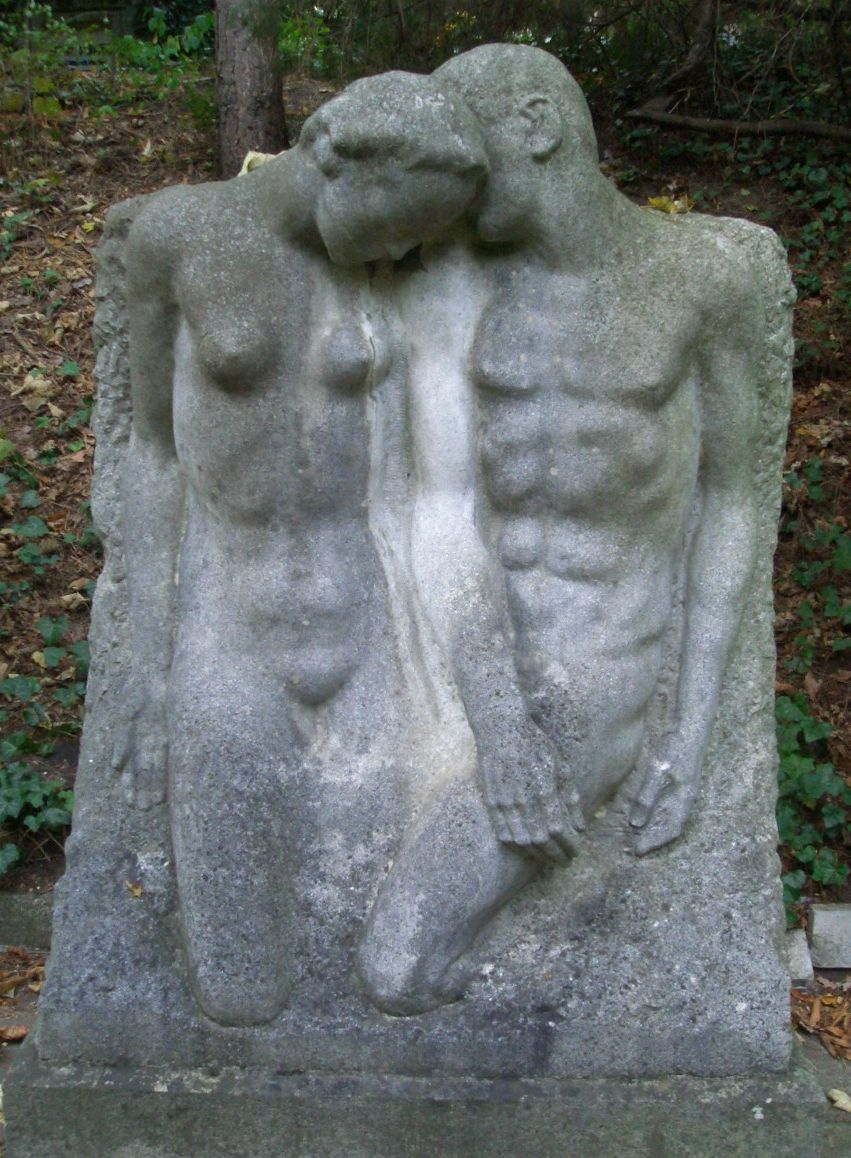
Early sculpture by Josef Thorak at the grave of Franz Ullstein and his first wife Charlotte at Friedhof Heerstraße in Berlin-Westend

Franz Ullstein (16 January 1868 – 12 November 1945) was a German Jewish publisher and art collector persecuted by the Nazis.

== Life ==
Franz Edgar Ullstein was born on 16 January 1868, in Berlin, Brandenburg, Prussia, Germany into the famous Ullstein publishing dynasty, which published the Ullstein Verlag, the most important publishing house in Germany prior to the rise of Hitler and the Nazi dictatorship. Ullstein was a publisher and art collector. When Leopold Ullstein died in 1899, his five sons, Louis, Hand, Franz, Rudolf and Hermann, took over the business. Each son had an area of specialization. Franz was responsible for newspapers. Together, they brothers built the publishing house into a modern media company employing around 10,000 employees in 1930. Franz Ullstein's first wife Lotte died in 1928. They had a son, Kurt. The Ullsteins were a Jewish family, which led to their persecution, the loss of their publishing house and exile when the Nazis came to power in Germany.

== Art Collection ==
Ullstein was a well-known art collector.

Artworks he once owned are now in major museums, such as Monet's Garden at Giverny, and Gustave Courbet's Portrait du sculpteur Louis-Joseph Lebœuf, at the collection of the Fondation Emil Bührle.

== Nazi era ==
When the Nazis came to power in 1933, the Ullstein family was persecuted because of their Jewish heritage. Ullstein Verlag was "Aryanised" in 1934, that is, forcibly transferred to a non-Jewish owner. The company was renamed Deutscher Verlag in 1937 and affiliated with the Nazi's (NSDAP's) central publishing house. Ullstein emigrated to the United States in 1941. The Ullsteins were persecuted and plundered of their assets through anti-Jewish racial laws that imposed special confiscatory taxes on Jews as well as outright expropriation.

== Postwar ==
Ullstein died in New York City in a traffic accident on 12 November 1945.

== Claims for restitution ==
The efforts of the Ullstein family to obtain restitution of the properties stolen from them under the Nazis encountered many obstacles and were extremely difficult. The author Juliane Berndt wrote a study on the process entitled, Die Restitution des Ullstein-Verlags (1945–52).

== In popular literature ==
The novel Haus der Bücher by Beate Rygiert tells a version of Franz Ullstein's biography.
