= Walter Corti =

Swiss writer (1910–1990)

Walter Corti (1955)

Walter Robert Corti (11 September 1910 – 12 January 1990) was a Swiss philosopher and writer. He contributed to the newspaper Neue Zürcher Zeitung and the cultural magazine Du. In 1946 (after World War II) he helped found the Pestalozzi Children's Village which served homeless children and orphans from the war-torn countries.

== Early life and education ==
Walter Corti was born on 11 September 1910 in Zurich as the son of the botanic Alfred Corti the owner of the chemical company Flora in Dübendorf and a descendent of Italian immigrants who had established themselves in the Ticino. His mother was a Christian woman from Westphalia in Germany and a former student to the evangelic Friedrich von Bodelschwingh. He attended primary school in Dübendorf, and high school at the Glarisegg at the shores of Lake Constance. In 1925 he graduated from the reformist boarding school Glarisegg. Through the private school of Sinai Tschuloks he obtained a Federal Matura in 1930.

When he was 19 years old he became interested in the pan-idealist movement led by the Paneuropean Union of Richard von Coudenhove-Kalergi, becoming the president of the European youth section. He decided to become a medic and in 1931 with the aim of becoming a brain scientist began to study medicine at the University of Zurich, where he became the president of the Medicine Students Association. In 1933 he attended a semester in the University of Vienna where he was confronted with Nazism. He found his worldview challenged and went to study at the University of Berlin where his lodge was searched by the Gestapo and forbidden books were found. Following a student court found Corti as essentially Jewish and a merely tolerated foreigner the idea to assemble a library of the knowledge of all mankind emerged. He wanted to be employed at the psychiatric clinic Burghölzli in Zurich. While studying at the University of Frankfurt 1937, shortly before graduation, he contracted tuberculosis and had to abandon his studies. Corti underwent surgery and recovered in several health facilities.

== Professional career ==
In the 1940s his literary interests gained some success, in 1940 he won the Swiss University Journal championship for his article Ratio Militans for which in 1942 was awarded the Conrad Ferdinand Meyer Prize. Following he was a high school teacher, a contributor to the Neue Zürcher Zeitung and organized lectures at the psychiatric clinic Burghölzli. In 1942 he became an editor of the cultural magazine "Du" from Conzett & Huber.

Under the Editor-in-Chief Arnold Kübler he was an editor for the Du until 1957. He was also assemble a library and expand into an archive on genetic philosophy. Specialized libraries around the works of the philosophers Friedrich Wilhelm Joseph Schelling and Georg Wilhelm Friedrich Hegel came into the collection of Corti. In 1957 Herbert Schneider gave him more than 2500 books from the philosophical library of the Columbia University in New York.

In 1954 Corti called for the establishment of an academy in which research on peace, disarmament and the sociological conditions for development would be the focus and a large library on scientific literature should have place. The academy shall have become an international settlement of scholars. His plans were met with disappointment as in 1969 Uetikon withdrew a former permission to build the academy on land of their municipality. After his death, the library became part of the Centre for Ethical studies of the University of Zurich.

== Pestalozzi Children's Village ==
During World War II, Walter Corti and Marie Meierhofer discussed, what solution was to be found for the homeless children in the war-torn countries. In the August issue of Du in 1944, Corti advocated in support of the establishment of a village for orphans of World War II. There were several localities that offered themselves for the children's village, such as Unterägeri in Zug or Zweisimmen in Bern, but eventually it was in Trogen in Appenzell where the Pestalozzi village was established on 28 April 1946. In the village, orphans from the war-torn countries were to be welcomed, in September the first children from France arrived and by the end of the year seven houses were inhabited.

Corti would preside over the institution from 1946 to 1950 and thereafter its honorary president. In 1956 he would receive an honorary citizenship of the Pestalozzi Children's village. On 24 October 1960, the United Nations Day, he laid the foundation stone for the first international house in the Pestalozzi International Village in Sedlescombe, United Kingdom

== Philosophy ==
Experiences like reading news from World War I in the childhood, the baptism which he refused while fifteen years of age, the reading of the Luther Bible, the philosophies of Baruch Spinoza and Immanuel Kant had some impact on him. With nineteen years of age he became interested in the pan-idealist movement led by the Paneuropean Union of Richard von Coudenhove-Kalergi, becoming the president of the European youth section.

The Paneuropean Union propagates a Union of the European countries in order to maintain a peaceful Europe. He attended the congress of Christian students in 1932 and by 1934 he got in contact with the Eranos circle in Ascona, where he met with Carl Gustav Jung and Martin Buber. He would assemble a library of 30'000 volumes and donate it to the Academic Foundation for ethical studies in 1976. This donation would become the centre for ethical studies at the University of Zurich in 1989.

== Personal life ==
He married Anna Bonzo, the daughter of Hungarian violinist in 1946. He was the father of three girls and one boy. The family lived from 1954 until 1964 in Zurich and from 1964 to 1988 Corti and his wife settled to Winterthur in the house of poet Hans Reinhart, who died in 1963. Corti died on 12 January 1990 in Winterthur.

== Recognition ==
- 1942 Conrad Ferdinand Meyer Prize
- 1957 Dr. h.c. in Philosophy of the University of Tübingen
- 1975 Albert Schweizer Prize in Brussels
