= Ernst Haas =

American photographer

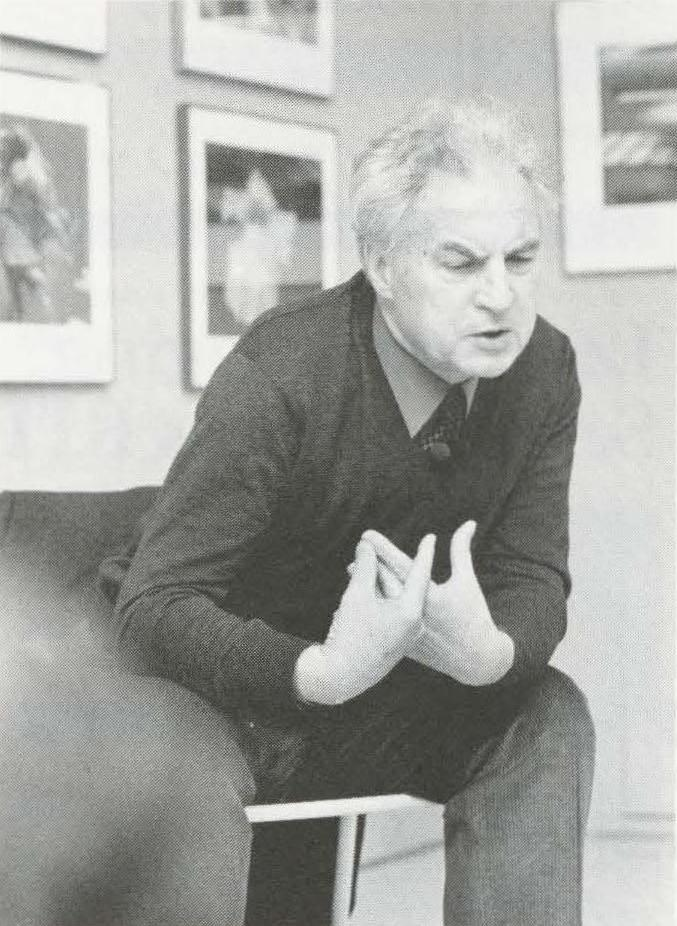
- Haas in 1986
- Born: March 2, 1921; Vienna, Austria
- Died: September 12, 1986 (aged 65); New York, New York, United States
- Occupation: Photographer
- Spouse(s): Antoinette Wenckheim (1951–1962); Cynthia Buehr Seneque (1962–1965)
- Children: 2
- Awards: Hasselblad Award (1986)
- Website: www.ernst-haas.com

Ernst Haas (March 2, 1921 – September 12, 1986) was an Austrian-American photojournalist and color photographer. During his 40-year career Haas trod the line between photojournalism and art photography. In addition to his coverage of events around the globe after World War II Haas was an early innovator in color photography. His images were carried by magazines like Life and Vogue and, in 1962, were the subject of the first single-artist exhibition of color photography at New York's Museum of Modern Art. He served as president of the cooperative Magnum Photos. His book of volcano photographs, The Creation (1971), remains one of the most successful photography books ever published, selling more than 350,000 copies.

== Early life and education ==
Haas was born in Vienna, Austria, on March 2, 1921. He was the son of Ernst Haas, a high-level civil servant, and Frederike Haas-Zipser. He had an older brother named Fritz Haas.

Haas was raised in the cultural climate of Vienna before World War II. His parents, who placed great value upon education and the arts, encouraged his creative pursuits from an early age. His father enjoyed music and photography, and his mother wrote poetry and aspired to be an artist. Haas's teachers had him act as a judge, rather than a participant, in artistic competitions among his peers. As a painter, he had particular interest in an artwork's formal qualities, and developed a refined sense of composition and perspective.

From 1935 to 1938, Haas attended LEH Grinzing, a private school in Vienna, where he studied art, literature, poetry, philosophy, and science. His formal education was interrupted in 1938, when the school was closed following Germany's invasion of Austria. The following year, Haas received his diploma from Rainer Gymnasium.

Haas was sent to a German army labor camp, working six hours a day in exchange for two daily hours of school attendance. He left the service in 1940 and returned to Vienna to study medicine. Haas was only able to complete one year of medical school before he was forced out as a result of his Jewish ancestry.

== Career ==
=== Introduction to photography ===
Haas was uninterested in learning photography as a child, though his father tried to encourage him. Upon his father's death in 1940, Haas first entered the darkroom, learning to print old family negatives. His interest grew, and he soon began to take his own photographs.

Though his formal education was complicated by the war, Haas was an autodidact and worked to learn the medium. In 1941, as the “school photographer” of the Max Reinhardt Film Seminar, he attended technical classes and developed an interest in filmmaking. Haas also took advantage of his family's extensive library, as well as museums and libraries in Vienna. He studied philosophy and poetry, in particular, both of which informed his beliefs about the creative potential for photography.

A Poet’s Camera selection of photography by Bryan Holme (1946), which combined poetry with metaphoric imagery by artists like Edward Weston, was particularly important to Haas's early development. Many of his first extant photographs—close-ups of plants, water, and natural forms—reflect its influence.

Unsure of his career path, Haas realized that photography could provide both a means of support and a vehicle for communicating his ideas. He obtained his first camera in 1946, at the age of 25, trading a 20-pound block of margarine for a Rolleiflex on the Vienna black market. Of the decision, he later said:

I never really wanted to be a photographer. It slowly grew out of the compromise of a boy who desired to combine two goals—explorer or painter. I wanted to travel, see and experience. What better profession could there be than the one of a photographer, almost a painter in a hurry, overwhelmed by too many constantly changing impressions? But all my inspirational influences came much more from all the arts than from photo magazines.

In 1947 Haas presented his first exhibition at the American Red Cross in Vienna, where he had a part-time position teaching photography to soldiers. Taking a portfolio of his work to Zurich, he drew the interest of Arnold Kübler, the first editor in chief of the magazine Du. After reviewing his photographs, Kübler introduced Haas to Swiss photographer Werner Bischof’s images of Berlin after the war. Influenced by Bischof's work, Haas began to consider how an image could simultaneously tell a story and function as an autonomous work of art. When Haas returned home, he similarly documented the war’s effects in Vienna.

Haas' Homecoming Prisoners, Vienna, 1947

Haas obtained assignments from magazines like Heute, often working with fellow correspondent Inge Morath. In 1947, while scouting locations for a fashion shoot, Haas and Morath witnessed prisoners of war disembarking a train and began documenting their arrival. Haas’s images show the anticipation and grief of people searching for their lost relatives among the survivors. The resulting photo essay, “Homecoming,” was published in both Heute and Life magazine.

=== Magnum Photos ===
Warren Trabant showed Robert Capa, the war photographer, Haas's “Homecoming” photographs before they were published. Upon reviewing his work, Capa invited Haas to travel to Paris and join the international photographic cooperative Magnum Photos, then two years old. Henri Cartier-Bresson, George Rodger, David “Chim” Seymour, Werner Bischof, and William Vandivert were already members.

At the same time, Haas was offered a staff photographer position at Life. He decided he did not want to be limited by Life’s restrictive scope. Describing his decision in a letter to Life editor Wilson Hicks, Haas wrote “What I want is to stay free, so that I can carry out my ideas... I don’t think there are many editors who could give me the assignments I give myself...”

=== United States ===
After carrying out assignments in Vienna and London, Haas conceived an extensive project about America. Visas to the United States were difficult to obtain, but in 1950 Robert Capa appointed him Magnum's U.S. vice president. With this position, Haas was able to obtain the proper documentation, and he arrived in New York in May of that year. The first images Haas took in the United States showed fellow immigrants arriving at Ellis Island.

By the time of Haas's arrival, the streets of New York had already become a popular subject for photographers who sought to document all aspects of life. His approach was less direct and confrontational than that of colleagues such as Lisette Model and William Klein. Wrote critic A.D. Coleman, “[Haas] was a lyric poet pursuing a photographic equivalent of gestural drawing, utilizing such photographic effects as softness of focus, selective depth of field, and overexposure to telling effect.”

While Haas would continue traveling for his work, he lived the rest of his life in New York City.

=== Assignments for Life magazine ===
In 1952 Haas hitchhiked across the United States to White Sands National Monument in New Mexico, planning to photograph Native Americans. Working with the vast area's changing light and clouds, Haas also photographed symbols, local details, and tourist oddities. His finished photo essay, published by Life as “Land of Enchantment” in a six-page spread, was well received by readers and prompted the magazine to initiate another project. According to writer (and early Magnum employee) Inge Bondi, Haas’ Western chronicle was the first major story he created based on his own instinct and at his own financial risk.

Once back in New York, Haas purchased color film to begin a new project. He had experimented with color as early as 1949, but this would be his first opportunity to work with what was still a scarce and expensive medium. Haas spent two months photographing New York, and in 1953 Life published his vivid images. Titled “Images of a Magic City,” the sprawling 24-page story spanned two issues. According to critic Andy Grundberg, these images “brought photography into the precincts of abstract expressionism.”

=== Technique and innovations in color photography ===
Haas' La Suerte De Capa, Pamplona, Spain, 1956

Though Haas continued to use black-and-white film for much of his career, color film and visual experimentalism became integral to his photography. He frequently employed techniques like shallow depth of field, selective focus, and blurred motion to create evocative, metaphorical works. When he submitted his blurred motion bullfight photos, original at the time, to the lab they said there was a problem and they were unusable. Life ran a 12-page spread. He became interested in, as he put it, "transforming an object from what it is to what you want it to be." Beyond the physical place, person, or object he depicted, Haas hoped to reflect the joy of looking and of human experience.

Haas supported his personal projects through work in photojournalism, advertising, and motion picture still photography. During these assignments, he also produced independent photographs that reflected his interests in poetry, music, painting, and travel. As his reputation grew, he traveled internationally, photographing in the United States, Europe, South Africa and Southeast Asia, often working in color.

In the late 1940s, Haas switched from his medium format Rolleiflex to the smaller 35mm Leica rangefinder camera, which he used consistently for the rest of his career. Once he began working in color, he most often used Kodachrome, known for its rich, saturated colors. To print his color work, Haas used the dye transfer process whenever possible. An expensive, complex process most frequently used at the time for advertising, dye transfer allowed for great control over color hue and saturation.

As the technology of color photography evolved and improved during this period, audience interest in color imagery increased. Many of the magazines that published Haas’ work, such as Life, improved the quality of their color reproduction, and increasingly sought to include his work in the medium. Despite this progress, many photographers, curators, and historians were initially reluctant to consider color photography as art, given the technology's commercial origins.

=== Leadership of Magnum ===
In 1954 Robert Capa, Magnum's first president, was killed while on assignment covering the First Indochina War. That same year, Werner Bischof died in a car accident in the Andes. Following their deaths, Haas was elected to Magnum's board of directors and traveled to Indochina himself to cover the war.

After the death of David “Chim” Seymour in Suez in 1959, Haas was named the fourth president of Magnum. He made significant and lasting contributions to the organization as its leader. Haas had a deep understanding of the cooperative's mission and encouraged its members to strive for excellence and innovation. In a letter to the members of Magnum, he wrote:

Every one of us wants to take beautiful, striking, extraordinary pictures. Every one of us is struggling with his own style. Changes don’t come purely by will power alone, but they never come by being satisfied. Let us be more critical with each other: it will bring us closer. Let us find a new common denominator in the struggle, not to follow our own standards of invention. Don’t cover—discover!

=== Advertising and stills photography ===
Haas was a respected stills photographer for many films, including The Misfits, Little Big Man, Moby Dick, Hello Dolly, West Side Story, and Heaven's Gate. John Huston employed Haas as a second-unit director for his 1966 film The Bible: In the Beginning (a.k.a. The Bible), to visualize the section devoted to creation.

Haas was notable for his editorial journalism and unit stills work, but was reluctant to pursue work in advertising before meeting Amil Gargano, an uncharacteristic advertising art director. Gargano hired Haas after their first meeting for a photojournalist trip to Scandinavia for his client SAS in 1965. During their two-week trip, Haas explained his reluctance to advertising. A photographer friend suggested Haas take a year off and make a lot more money photographing for advertising. "If I do that, after one year, I won't be able to tell the difference between good and bad work anymore." However, the photographs he shot for SAS were more art than advertising.

=== Television appearances and teaching ===
In 1962, the year of his retrospective at the Museum of Modern Art, Haas was invited to write and host The Art of Seeing, a four-hour miniseries for National Public Television, then in its first year. Newsweek magazine praised its success as a television program, for Haas combined seeing with hearing. Throughout the series, Haas demonstrated what makes a successful photograph, illustrating how images can be transformed by the slightest variations of technique, perspective, or choice of tools and materials.

Haas also taught frequently at photography workshops, including the Maine Photographic Workshops, the Ansel Adams Workshop in Yosemite National Park, and the Anderson Ranch Arts Center near Aspen, Colorado.

== Exhibitions ==
In 1962 the Museum of Modern Art in New York presented a ten-year survey of Haas's color photography. Titled Ernst Haas: Color Photography, the exhibition marked MoMA's first solo-artist retrospective exhibition dedicated to color work, and took place during Edward Steichen’s final year as director of the museum's Department of Photography. It was realized by Steichen’s successor John Szarkowski, and consisted of about 80 prints including Haas’s motion studies and color essays. Of Haas’ revelatory color imagery, Steichen has said, “He is a free spirit, untrammelled by tradition and theory, who has gone out and found beauty unparalleled in photography.” No exhibition catalogue was produced at the time, but the original prints exist, allowing a much later "re-creation" of the exhibition.

Before his solo exhibition at MoMA, Haas had been included in Steichen's exhibition The Family of Man, which premiered in 1955 and traveled to 38 countries.

== The Creation and other publications ==
The Creation, by Haas

Haas was inspired and fascinated by the natural world, and took photographs of the elements throughout his career. Inspired in part by his involvement in John Huston's 1966 film The Bible, Haas conceived an ambitious, multi-year project to visualize the theme of the Earth's creation, as described in a variety of religious texts, primarily the Old Testament. His book The Creation, first published in 1971, presented 106 color photographs made throughout the world, organized into an expressive, poetic sequence. The book was produced in multiple editions in numerous languages through 1988, selling over 350,000 copies to become one of the best-selling photography books of all time.

Haas also issued the monographs In America (1975), In Germany (1977), and Himalayan Pilgrimage (1978).

In 1980 Haas published a limited edition portfolio of dye transfer prints from The Creation with Daniel Wolf Press. He also began work on a book devoted to Japan and a project illustrating the poetry of Rainer Maria Rilke, whose writings inspired him throughout his life.

Posthumous books of Haas’ photographs include: Ernst Haas: Color Photographs (1989); Ernst Haas in Black and White (1992); Ernst Haas (Photo Poche), 2010; and Ernst Haas: Color Correction (2011).

== Personal life and family ==
In 1951 Haas married the Hungarian countess Antoinette Wenckheim. They later divorced, and in 1962 Haas married Cynthia Buehr Seneque, an American editor. They had two children, Alexander and Victoria.

Gisela Minke, a German-born airline stewardess, was Haas's companion for many years. She encouraged his interest in Tibet, and their travels resulted in the book Himalayan Pilgrimage. Six years before his death, he met Takiko Kawai, who he credited with introducing him to the culture and traditions of Japan.

=== Later life and death ===
In the early 1970s Haas became interested in creating audiovisual slideshows—long sequences of projected imagery with accompanying soundtracks, dissolving from one image into the next. "I love music," he explained, "and with my audiovisual presentation I can combine music and photography.”

After suffering a stroke in December 1985, Haas concentrated on layouts for two books he wanted to publish, one featuring his black and white photographs, the other his color. At the time of his death from a stroke on September 12, 1986, he had been preparing to write his autobiography.

== Legacy ==
In 1958, Haas was listed as one of the 10 greatest photographers in the world by Popular Photography magazine, along with Ansel Adams, Richard Avedon, Henri Cartier-Bresson, Alfred Eisenstadt, Philippe Halsman, Yousuf Karsh, Gjon Mili, Irving Penn, and W. Eugene Smith. He won the Hasselblad Award just before his death.

A number of awards have been created in Haas's honor, including the Ernst Haas Award for Creative Photography by the American Society of Media Photographers (ASMP); and the Ernst Haas Photographers Grant, funded by Kodak, at the Maine Photographic Workshops. In 1998 the Ernst Haas Studio archive was sent to London to be housed at the Hulton Getty Picture Library as part of a licensing agreement with Getty Images. In 1999 the Ernst Haas Memorial Collection was established at the Portland Museum of Art in Maine.

The Ernst Haas Estate is operated by his children, Alexander Haas and Victoria Haas.

== Selected awards ==
- Newhouse Award from Syracuse University, 1958
- The Cultural Award from the German Society for Photography (DGPh), 1972
- Wilson Hicks Medal from the University of Miami, 1978
- Hasselblad Photographer of the Year, 1986
- Leica Medal of Excellence: Master of Photography, 1986

== Publications ==
=== Publications by, or devoted to, Haas ===
- Mainichi Shinbun. Erunsuto Hāsu: Karā shashinten (エルンストハース カラー写真展). Tokyo: Seibu, 1962. (in Japanese)
- Ernst Haas. The Creation. New York: The Viking Press, 1971.
  - Ernst Haas. The Creation. Revised ed. New York: The Viking Press, 1983.
- Ernst Haas. In America. New York: The Viking Press, 1975.
- Ernst Haas. In Germany. New York: The Viking Press, 1977.
- Ernst Haas. Himalayan Pilgrimage, text by Gisela Minke. New York: The Viking Press, 1978.
- Bryn Campbell. Ernst Haas. The Great Photographers. London: Collins, 1983. ISBN 0004119363.
- Ernst Haas. Color Photography. New York: Abrams, 1989.
- Alexander Haas and Jim Hughes, eds. Ernst Haas in Black and White. Introduction by Jim Hughes. Boston: Little, Brown, 1992.
- Erunsuto Hāsu ten: Shashin de kanaderu shikasai no shi (エルンストハース展 写真で奏でる色彩の詩). Tokyo: Pacific Press Service, 1993. ISBN 4938635402. Exhibition catalogue (in Japanese)
- Color Correction. Göttingen: Steidl, 2011. Edited by William A. Ewing. ISBN 978-3869301365. With an essay by Phillip Prodger.

=== Publications with photographs by Haas ===
- Edward Steichen, ed. The Family of Man. New York: The Museum of Modern Art, 1955.
- L. Fritz Gruber. Grosse Photographen unseres Jahrhunderts. Darmstadt: Deutsche Buch-Gemeinschaft, 1964.
- The Camera. Life Library of Photography. New York: Time-Life Books, 1970.
- Color. Life Library of Photography. New York: Time-Life Books, 1970.
- The Great Themes. Life Library of Photography. New York: Time-Life Books, 1970.
- Arnold Ehrlich. The Beautiful Country: Maine to Hawaii. New York: The Viking Press, 1970.
- Great Photographers. Life Library of Photography. New York: Time-Life Books, 1971.
- Photographing Children. Life Library of Photography. New York: Time-Life Books, 1971.
- The Studio. Life Library of Photography. New York: Time-Life Books, 1971.
- Cornell Capa, ed. The Concerned Photographer 2. New York: Grossman, 1972.
- The Grand Canyon. The American Wilderness, edited by Robert Wallace. New York: Time-Life Books, 1972.
- Frontiers of Photography. Life Library of Photography. New York: Time-Life Books, 1972.
- Photography Year/1973 Edition. New York: Time-Life Books, 1972.
- Cactus Country. The American Wilderness, edited by Edward Abbey. New York: Time-Life Books, 1973.
- Hellmut Andics and Ernst Haas. Ende und Anfang. Wien, Hamburg, and Düsseldorf: Paul Zsolnay and Econ Verlag, 1975.
- Photography Year/1975 Edition. New York: Time-Life Books, 1975.
- Venice. The Great Cities, edited by Aubrey Menen. Amsterdam: Time-Life Books, 1976.
- Photography Year/1976 Edition. New York: Time-Life Books, 1976.
- Roland Wolf. Was die Menschheit Bewegt: Ich und die Anderen. Munchen: proSport, 1977.
- Roland Wolf. Was die Menschheit Bewegt: Wir in unserer Welt. Munchen: proSport, 1977.
- Samuel S. Walker (text) and Ernst Haas (photographs). Realms of Light: A Collection of Poetry through the Ages. New York: Walker and Company, 1978. ISBN 0802706193.
- Bryn Campbell. Exploring Photography. London: British Broadcasting Corporation, 1978.
- The Editors of Eastman Kodak Company. The Joy of Photography. Reading, Mass.: Addison-Wesley, 1979.
- Roland Wolf. Zukunft unserer Kinder, 2 vols. Munchen: proSport, 1979.
- Helen Gee. Photography of the Fifties: An American Perspective. Tucson: Center for Creative Photography, The University of Arizona, 1980.
- Roland Wolf and Karl Wadosch. Lake Placid. Munchen: proSport, 1980.
- Bryn Campbell, ed. World Photography. New York: Ziff-Davis Books, 1981.
- The Art of Photography. rev. ed. Life Library of Photography. Alexandria, Va.: Time-Life Books, 1981.
- Color. Rev. ed. Life Library of Photography. Alexandria, Va. Time-Life Books, 1981.
- Photography Year 1981 Edition. Alexandria, Va. Time-Life Books, 1981.
- Renate Gruber and L. Fritz Gruber. Das imaginäre Photo-Museum, dumont foto 3, Cologne: DuMont, 1981.
- Roland Wolf. Freiheit, Die ich meine, 2 vols. Munchen: proSport, 1981.
- Travel Photography. Rev. ed. Life Library of Photography. Alexandria, Va. Time-Life Books, 1982.
- George Walsh and Colin Naylor, Michael Held. Contemporary Photographers. New York: St. Martin s Press, 1982.
- Great Photographers. Rev. ed. Life Library of Photography. Alexandria, Va.: Time-Life Books, 1983.
- Photojournalism. Rev. ed. Life Library of Photography. Alexandria, Va.: Time-Life Books, 1983.
- Roland Wolf and Elfie E Wolf. Frieden. Nlunchen: proSport, 1983.
- Olympus Optical Co. One Moment of the World, Photovision, vol 2. Tokyo: Olympus,1984.
- Brian Brake, ed. Focus on New Zealand. Auckland, New Zealand: Collins,1986.
- Jay Maisel, ed. The Most Beautiful Places in the World: Impressions of Ten Master Photographers. New York: Friendly Press, 1986.
- International Center of Photography. Master Photographs from Pfa Exhibitions, 1959-67. New York International Center of Photography,1988.
- William Manchester, ed. In Our Time: The World as Seen by Magnum Photographers, W.W. Norton, 1989.
- Martin Harrison, ed. Appearances: Fashion Photography since 1945. New York: Rizzoli, 1991.
- "The Spanish West". 1994
- Richard Lacayo and George Russell. Eyewitness, 150 Years of Photojournalism. New York, N.Y.: Time Books 1995.
- Magnum Landscape, London: Phaidon, 1996.
- Ellen Handy. Reflections in Glass Eye. New York: ICP, and Boston: Bulfinch, 1999.

== Exhibitions ==
=== Solo exhibitions ===
- 1947: American Red Cross Headquarters, Vienna, Austria
- 1960: Ernst Haas, Cologne, Germany, photokina, travelling exhibition
- 1962: Ernst Haas: Color Photography, travelling exhibition, sponsored by Mainichi Newspapers, Japan
- 1962: Ernst Haas: Color Photography, New York, the Museum of Modern Art
- 1963: Ernst Haas: World of Color, sponsored by Eastman Kodak, exhibited on five different continents.
- 1964: Ernst Haas/Color Photography, St. Louis, Steinberg Hall, Washington University
- 1964: Poetry in Color, New York, The IBM Gallery
- 1965: The Art of Seeing, an exhibition organized by Kodak that traveled to Mexico, England, France, Germany, Austria, Spain, the Netherlands, Belgium, Finland, Southeast Asia, Japan, and Brazil
- 1968–1971: Angkor and Bali: Two Worlds of Ernst Haas, Asia House Gallery, New York. Under the auspices of The American Federation of Arts traveled to Grand Valley State College, Allingdale, Mich.; Royal Ontario Museum, Toronto; Stephens College, Columbia, Mo.; University of Manitoba, Canada; Kent School Kent, Conn.; University of Arkansas, Fayetteville
- 1971: The Creation, Rizzoli Gallery, New York
- 1972: Ernst Haas: Nach dem Krieg (After the War), Museum des 20 Jahrhunderts; Kulturhaus, Kulturamt der Stadt, Graz, Vienna and Graz
- 1972: Ernst Haas: Die Schöpfung (The Creation), photokina, Cologne
  - 1973: Photomuseum im Munchner Stadtmuseum, Munich
  - 1973: Österreichisches Museum für Angewandte Kunst, Vienna
- 1973: Ernst Haas (Returning Soldiers), Landesgalerie im Schloss Esterhazy, Eisenstadt
- 1973: The Creation, Kodak Gallery, London
- 1975: Ernst Haas: Postwar Photographs, 1945–1949, Austrian Institute, New York
- 1976: Ernst Haas, Space Gallery, New York
- 1976: Ernst Haas: An American Experience, International Center of Photography, and Port Washington Public Library, New York
- 1976–1977: Ernst Haas, La Fotogalería, Madrid
- 1978: In Deutschland, photokina, Cologne
- 1978: The Creation and Other Dyes, Space Gallery, New York
- 1980: The Creation, Elayne Art Gallery, Minneapolis
- 1982: Ernst Haas: Heimkehrer (Returning Soldiers), Galerie Fotohof, Salzburg
- 1984: St. Louis Botanical Garden
- 1985: Ernst Haas, Western States Museum of Photography, Santa Barbara
- 1986: To See, To Be, Rochester Institute of Technology, Rochester
- 1986: Ernst Haas Photographs, Larry Kauffman Galleries, Houston
- 1986: Ernst Haas, Silver Visions Gallery, Newton Upper Falls, Mass.
- 1986: Ernst Haas (1921–1986) Photographien, Museum des 20. Jahrhunderts, Vienna, Austria
  - 1996: Neue Galerie der Stadt Linz
- 1987: Ernst Haas, Rshsska Konstslsjdmuseet, Gothenborg, Sweden
- 1992: Ernst Haas in Black and White, International Center of Photography, New York
  - 1993: The Camera Obscura Gallery, Denver, Colorado
  - 1994: Kathleen Ewing Gallery, Washington, D.C.
  - 1994: Etherton Gallery, Tucson, Arizona
  - 2001: Ann Shanks Photography Gallery, Sheffield, MA
- 1992: American Photographs 1950–1975, Howard Greenberg Gallery, New York
- 1993: Unpublished Black and White Images, A.O.I. Gallery, Santa Fe, New Mexico
- 1994: Rediscovery of a New Vision, A.O.I. Gallery, Santa Fe, New Mexico
- 1998: Only Time Will Tell, Michael Hoppen Photography, London, U.K.
- 1999: Contour and Colour: Ernst Haas. An Exhibition of Colour Photography, Connoly's, London, U.K.
- 2000: Ernst Haas, New York, Soho Triad Fine Arts, New York
- 2001: Ernst Haas: Color and Black and White, Ann Shanks Photography Gallery, Sheffield, MA
- 2001: Ernst Haas Reflections, Art of this Century^{?}
  - 2002: Maison des Arts, ?
- 2002: Ernst Haas: A Re-Creation Part 1 and Part 2, Bruce Silverstein Gallery, New York
- 2002: Ernst Haas: Eine Welt in Trümmern (A World in Ruins), Museum der Moderne, Rupertinum, Salzburg
- 2005: reCREATION: The first color photography exhibition at MoMA, Bruce Silverstein Gallery, New York
- 2006: Ernst Haas, Hollywood, Farmani Gallery, Los Angeles
- 2006: Ernst Haas, Total Vision, Atlas Gallery, London
- 2009: Force of Nature, Danese, London
- 2009: Ernst Haas: Color Correction, curated by William Ewing, New York Photo Festival, New York
  - 2011: Atlas Gallery, London
  - 2012: Christophe Guye Galerie, Zurich
- 2010: Exhibition from the book Color Correction, Arles Photo Festival, Arles, France
- 2011: The Creation, Portland Museum of Art, Portland, ME
  - 2011: Weston Gallery, Carmel-by-the-Sea, CA
- 2011: Ernst Haas, Basia Embiricos Gallery and Photo 12 Gallery, Paris
- 2011: Ernst Haas: A Photography Retrospective, Post war Vienna 1945–1948, Museum der Moderne, Salzburg
- 2012: Ernst Haas: Classics, Duncan Miller Gallery, Bergamot Station, Santa Monica, CA

=== Group exhibitions ===
- 2011: History's Big Pictures, Monroe Gallery, Santa Fe, NM
- 2012: Cartier-Bresson: A Question of Colour, Somerset House, London

== Collections ==
Haas' work is held in the following public collections:

- Provincial Museum Voor Kunstambachten, Antwerp, Belgium
- New Zealand Center for Photography, Auckland, New Zealand
- Royal Society of Photography, Bath, UK
- Museum of Fine Arts, Boston, Massachusetts, US
- Mint Museum of Fine Art, Charlotte, North Carolina, US
- The Exchange National Bank of Chicago, Illinois, US
- Museum Ludwig, Cologne, Germany
- Erna and Victor Hasselblad Foundation, Goteborg, Sweden
- The National Museum of Art, Kyoto, Japan
- International Center of Photography, New York, US
- The Metropolitan Museum of Art, New York, US
- The Museum of Modern Art, New York, US
- Philip Morris Companies, Inc., New York, US
- Citibank Art Collection, New York, US
- Westinghouse Electric Corporation, Pittsburgh, Pennsylvania, US
- Reader's Digest, Pleasantville, New York, US
- Squibb Corporation, Princeton, New Jersey, US
- International Museum of Photography at the George Eastman House, Rochester, New York, US
- Kimberly-Clark Corporation, St. Louis, Missouri, US
- Missouri Botanical Garden, St Louis, Missouri, US
- Museum of Fine Art, St Petersburg, Florida, US
- Rupertinum Salzburger Museum, Salzburg, Austria
- Western States Museum of Photography, Santa Barbara, California, US
- National Museum of Art, Tokyo, Japan
- Museum Modern Kunst, Vienna, Austria
- Corcoran Gallery of Art, Washington, D.C., US
- National Portrait Gallery, Washington D.C., US
- International Photography Hall of Fame, St.Lous, Missouri, US

== General references ==
- Campbell, Bryn, ed. (1981). World Photography. Ziff-Davis Books. pp. 134–135.
- Capa, Cornell (1972). The Concerned Photographer 2. Grossman Publishers. pp. __.
- Coleman, A.D (2000). "A Painter in a Hurry: The Photography of Ernst Haas". Ernst Haas Website.
- Bondi, Inge (2000). "Biographical Essay". Ernst Haas Website. Ernst Haas Estate. Archived from the original on 2017-11-30.
- Haas, Ernst (1971). The Creation. The Viking Press. p. 147.
- Haas, Ernst (1992). Haas, Alexander; Hughes, Jim (eds.). Ernst Haas in Black and White. Bulfinch Press.
- Ewing, William A. (2011). Ernst Haas: Color Correction. Steidl.
- Grundberg, Andy (14 September 1986). "Obituary of Ernst Haas". The New York Times.
