= René Groebli =

Swiss photographer and photojournalist (1927–2026)

- René Gröbli
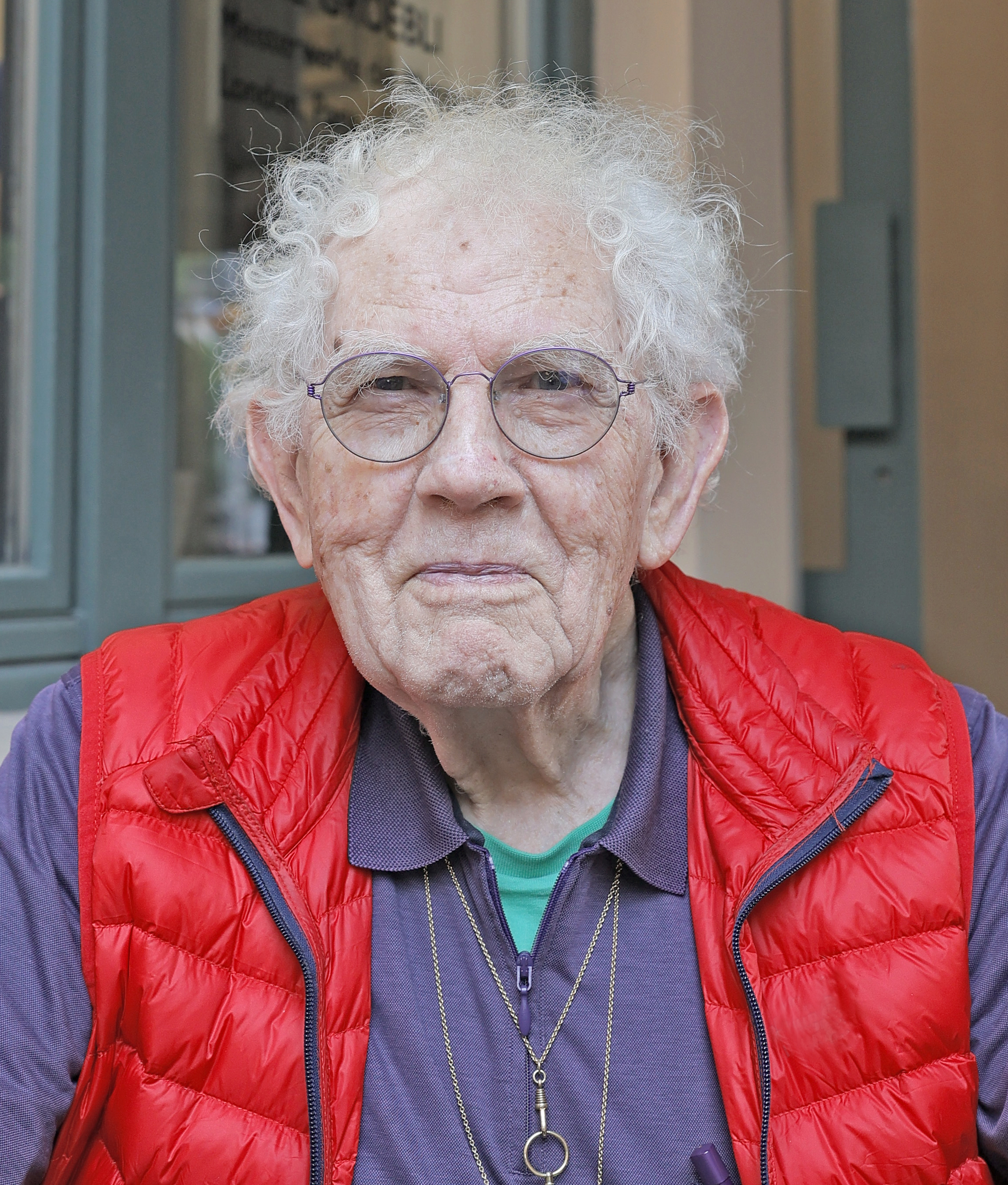
- Groebli in 2024
- Born: 9 October 1927; Zürich, Switzerland
- Died: 5 May 2026 (aged 98); Zürich, Switzerland
- Education: Zurich School of Applied Arts
- Known for: Artistic photo-books, industrial and advertising photography, photojournalism, photo-illustration
- Notable work: Magie der Schiene (1949), * Das Auge der Liebe (1954), Fantasies (1978)
- Style: Expressionism
- Father: Émile Groebli

René Groebli (sometimes spelt Gröbli; 9 October 1927 – 5 May 2026) was a Swiss exhibiting and published industrial and advertising photographer, known for his expressionistic photo-books, his photojournalism, and photo-illustration, and expertise in dye transfer and colour printing.

== Early life and education ==
René Groebli, son of Émile, a procurator, grew up in the Enge district of the city of Zürich, where he attended the Langzeitgymnasium. After two years, he moved to the Oberrealschule, a science-oriented grammar school, but broke off this education after two years to begin an apprenticeship as a photographer with Theo Vonow in Zurich in 1944. When his mentor moved back to Graubünden, Groebli entered the preparatory course of the Kunstgewerbeschule (Zurich School of Applied Arts), attending from the spring of 1945. Subsequently, he enrolled in the renowned professional class for photography under the direction of Hans Finsler and Alfred Willimann until the summer of 1946. Amongst his fellow students were Ernst Scheidegger and Anita Nietz.

In September 1946 Groebli began training as a documentary cameraman at Central Film and Gloria Film Zürich, graduating in late 1948 with a diploma, though he did not subsequently practice as a cinematographer.

In 1947 he won third prize in a competition run by the monthly magazine Camera with his series Karussell. Freelancing for Victor-N. Cohen agency in Zurich, in 1948 Groebli made his first trip to Paris and in 1949 bought his first Leica.

== Photojournalism ==
From 1949 Groebli worked as a photojournalist and carried out assignments for the Züri-Woche, and later in Africa and the Middle East for the London agency Black Star. The pictures were published in the magazines Life and Picture Post. His first small folio Magie der Schiene (Rail Magic), comprising 16 photographs (with front and back cover), was also shot in 1949 and self-published later the same year. It captures the ‘magic’ of steam train travel during the late 1940s. Despite being young and relatively unknown, Groebli was able to borrow enough money to finance the high-quality printing. Technically it is a portfolio rather than a book, with pages unbound and laid in loose, inspired by the Man Ray and Paul Éluard publication FACILE (1935) which he purchased on his first trip to Paris in 1948. Photographed with a Rolleiflex 6×6 and a Leica 35mm camera in and around Paris, as well as locations in Switzerland, the often motion-blurred and grainy images convey the energy of steam. An obi-band with German text was produced for approximately 30 to 40 original preorders, and other copies were sold without it. He held his first solo exhibition with photographs from the book. He spent three months in Paris where he met Brassaï and Robert Frank and spent a month in London.

On 13 October 1951 he and Rita Dürmüller (1923–2013) were married.

A second slim picture book, Das Auge der Liebe, self-published in 1954 through his business “Turnus”, was created in collaboration with his wife Rita Groebli, who had successfully completed a specialisation in applied and visual arts under Otto Morach at the Zurich School of Applied Arts. The graphic designer Werner Zryd produced the layout.

== Recognition ==
The small book, Das Auge der Liebe ('The Eye of Love'), though respected for its design and photography, caused some controversy, but also brought Groebli attention. It was assembled from shots made on the belated honeymoon that the photographer and his wife Rita took over two weeks in Paris in 1952 and in the following year in Marseille for a few days. Although publication of the photographs was not planned in 1953 Groebli sequenced it for a book, introducing a blank page to stand in for daytime in its chronology. In the Swiss Photorundschau, published by the Swiss Photographic Association, the editor Hermann König traded correspondence with a specialist teacher of the School of Applied Arts where the book had been passed around and argued over, the term "love" in the title being considered by students to be too sentimental given the obvious sexual connotations. Where the photographer’s intention was for a romantic effect, the editor admitted that the narrative was sexualized. In the leading periodical Neue Züricher Zeitung, editor Edwin Arnet objected to the emphasis on nudity. Groebli sequenced his photographs to tell the story of a woman meeting a man in a cheap hotel. The last photograph shows the woman's hand with a wedding ring on her ring finger holding an almost finished post-coitus cigarette. In the perception of audiences of the era, the implication was that the woman had to be either an ‘easy woman’, a prostitute, or an unfaithful wife. However the U.S. Camera Annual review of the work in 1955 pronounced it "a tender photo-essay on a photographer’s love for a woman.”

After the death of photojournalist Paul Senn in 1953 and the killing of Werner Bischof in Peru in 1954, Kurt Blum, Robert Frank and René Groebli were newly admitted to the Kollegium Schweizerischer Photographen. A major exhibition organized by the 'Kollegium' in 1955 convinced critics that a new 'Swiss style' that was indeed moving towards Photography as Expression as the exhibition was titled, and the end of critical (later dubbed 'concerned') photography. However, the association was soon disbanded because of disagreements between Gotthard Schuh and Jakob Tuggener, and Groebli had by then relinquished photojournalism.

In the same year, and with four other Swiss photographers, Werner Bischof, Robert Frank, Gotthard Schuh and Sabine Weiss, René Groebli was represented with a picture in the exhibition The Family of Man curated by Edward Steichen for the Museum of Modern Art in New York. His available-light photo shows a tight crowd of excited, dancing teenagers, their movement blurred in the style of Magie der Schiene.

== Studio photographer ==
Groebli launched his own studio for commercial industrial and advertising photography in 1955 in the newly built residential and studio building in Zurich-Wollishofen. Photographers who worked for him included Rolf Lyssy, Margareth Bollinger, Roland Glättli, Ruth Wüst, Roland Gretler, Marlies Tschopp and others. Many well-known graphic artists such as Werner Zryd, Victor N. Cohen, Karl Gerstner and Manfred Tulke commissioned the studio for lucrative photo assignments.

In 1957, the American photographic journal Popular Photography published in its 'Color Annual' a twelve-page image series hyperbolically entitled 'René Groebli - Master of Color'. In the 1950s, Groebli produced dye transfer prints from colour slides of commercial work printed in his studio with the specialists Werner Bruggmann in Winterthur and Raymund Schlauch in Frauenfeld. On 18 April 1959 he also founded Turnus Film AG, together with Hans-Peter Roth-Grieder of Gutenswil, R. A. Baezner in Geneva, P. Grieder, Zurich and Dr. med. W. H. Vock of Basel, with a registered share capital of two hundred and seventy thousand Swiss francs, with Groebli as executive.

At the end of the 1950s, Groebli also had his home and studio converted and enlarged and in addition to two studios and two black and white labs, a dye transfer workshop with several laboratory workstations was added. The expensive dye transfer enlargements were then a profitable business and specialist Ruedi Butz ran the studio from 1960 to 1972 with the expert assistance of John Whitehall. From 1972 to 1978 Derek Dawson took over the management of dye transfer production.

In 1963 Groebli founded the limited partnership Groebli + Guler with lithographer Walter Guler, renamed 'Fotolithos' in 1968. The workplace in Zurich-Wollishofen was equipped with the latest and best technical facilities and through the 1960s and early 1970s the business employed a staff of up to twelve, with good profits made from servicing the advertising photography industry. Important employees who worked at Groebli from the 1960s to the late 1970s, were, among others, photographers Felix Eidenbenz, Lotti Fetzer, Tom Hebting, Matthias Hofstetter, Peter Oberle, Anna Halm Schudel and Peter Schudel, Liselotte Straub, Katharina Vonow, and Heinz Walti, the intern Dona de Carli, re-photographer Jean-Pierre Trümpler, laboratory technician Sylvette Françoise Trümpler-Hofmann and Uschi Schliep, apprentice.

After ten years producing specialist colour photography, dye transfer production and colour lithographs for commercial advertising and industrial photography, in 1965 Groebli published his third photo book Variation through Arthur Niggli Verlag, Teufen. It presented a retrospective of possibilities of Groebli’s colour photography, though with scant mention of the role of his many employees and business partners. In 1971 he issued a second edition Variation 2, with updated information on colour technology including Cibachrome.

== Later career ==
In the 1970s, talented young photographers, including former Groebli co-workers and employees, opened their own photo studios and strove to answer the ever higher demands of advertising agencies and the increased pressure of competition. By the late 1970s, with the more widespread adoption and acceptance of chromogenic methods of colour production less technically demanding and cheaper than dye transfer, Groebli, then in his fifties, ceased commercial photography and colour production, sold his home and studio and retired, though he still maintained connections with the industry and presented a paper on dye transfer at the 1977 Rencontres d'Arles.

Groebli returned to making personal photographic essays in colour and in black and white, in series titled Fantasies, Ireland, The Shell, Burned Trees, N. Y. Visions, New York Melancholia and Nudes. Over the decades of the turn of the century, he worked on his image archive and digitised the most important photographs that he had taken over a career of sixty years, exhibiting and selling to collectors. Prints from Magie der Schiene (1949) and The Eye of Love (1952) are the most sought-after, and in 2021 L'Oeil de l'Amour was sold for US$14,860 by Koller Zurich. A special edition of The Eye of Love containing 12 platinum-palladium prints was listed for 25,000 CHF.

== Personal life and death ==
Groebli died on 5 May 2026, in his hometown of Zürich, aged 98.

== Book publications ==
- Magie der Schiene (1949), Texte: Gasser, Hans Ulrich/Ehrismann, Albert, Zürich, Kubus Verlag.
- Das Auge der Liebe (1954), Text: Gort Bischof, Walter: 25 Photos, Zürich, Turnus Verlag.
- Variation. Möglichkeiten der Farbfotografie (1965), Teufen, Niggli.
- Variation 2. Kommunikative Möglichkeiten der Farbfotografie (1971), Teufen, Niggli.
- Fantasies. 47 photographs (1978), New York, Images Gallery / Galerie Portfolio, Lausanne.
- Visionen. Photographien 1946–1991 (1992), Text Schaub, Martin: Sulgen, Niggli.
- Ireland (2000), Cham, Syndor Press.
- Rail Magic (2006), Zürich, Galerie Andy Jllien.
- Das Auge der Liebe (2014), Text: Gort Bischof, Walter, Filzmaier, Birgit: 30 Photos, Zürich, Sturm & Drang Verlag.
- Beryl Chen (2015), Text: Caduff, Reto, Zürich, Sturm & Drang Verlag.
- Early Work (2015), Text: Muscionico, Daniele, Zürich, Sturm & Drang Verlag.
- London 1949 (2016), Zürich, Sturm & Drang Verlag.
- Nudes (2016), Text: Blochwitz, Daniel, Zürich, Sturm & Drang Verlag.

== Awards ==
- 1951: Federal Scholarship
- 1953: Prix d’encouragement
- 1960: Prize and medal for 'Beispielhafte Anzeigengestaltung für Bayer' of the Werbefachverbandes Schweiz ('Swiss Advertising Association')
- 1966: Grafiker Preis der Deutschen Gebrauchs-Graphiker
- 1974: Award for Excellence in Typography, Directors Club, New York (USA)
- 1983: Honorary member, Schweizerischer Photographenverband
- 2006: Photo 06, Lifetime Award

== Exhibitions ==
- 1949: Bern, Anliker-Keller
- 1955: Zürich, Galerie 16
- 1966: Rapperswil, Galerie 58
- 1978: Arles, Rencontres Internationales de la Photographie
- 1978: Lausanne, Galerie Portfolio
- 1978: New York, Images Gallery
- 1979: Au / St. Gallen, Galerie Neufeld
- 1979: Bordeaux, Galerie Contact
- 1979: Köln, Limbach Galerie
- 1979: Paris, FNAC-Etoile
- 1979: Toulouse, Galerie Dieuzadie
- 1984: Zürich, Galerie Poseidon
- 1985: Isle-sur-la-Sorgue (F), Galerie Djélal
- 1991: Tarazona (E), Tarazona 91
- 1992: Genève, Centre de la Photographie
- 1992: Paris, Mois de la Photo
- 1992: Zürich, Galerie Renée Ziegler
- 1993: Cottbus, Brandenburgische Kunstsammlung
- 1995: La Ciotat (F), La Chapelle de Pénitenciers
- 1998: Paris, Galerie Camera Obscura
- 1999: Zürich, Kunsthaus, Bewegung - Experiment - Vision (Grosse Retrospektive)
- 1999: Zürich, Schweizerische Stiftung für die Photographie
- 2001: Zürich, Galerie Commercio
- 2002: Küsnacht, Nikon Image House
- 2002: Paris, Paris Photo, Stande Csaba Morocz
- 2002: Zürich, Fondation Koenig
- 2003: Basel, Galerie Stasia Hutter
- 2003: San Francisco, Robert Koch Gallery
- 2003: Zug, Galerie De Artis,
- 2005: Köln, Galerie Infocus
- 2006: Leipzig, Kamera- und Fotomuseum
- 2006: Zürich, Galerie Andy Jllien, Retrospective
- 2008: Hamburg, Aplanat Galerie, Retrospective
- 2009: Berlin, Galerie Hiltawsky, Retrospective
- 2009: Köln, Galerie Infocus
- 2012: Hermance, Fondation Auer, Ory
- 2012: Genf, Galerie Carry on SA
- 2014: Zürich, Photobastei
- 2016: Kilchberg, Bildhalle
- 2017: Zürich, Bildhalle
- 2020: Zürich, Bildhalle
- 2020: Köln, in focus Galerie
- 2021: Rene Groebli: The Eye Of Love, Bildhalle, Hazenstraat, Amsterdam
- 2022: René Groebli: Perspectives, Galerie Esther Woerdehoff, 15e, Paris
- 2024: René Groebli, WestLicht, Vienna, Austria
- 2024: Rene Groebli: Vintage Prints: The Eye of Love, Bildhalle, Zürich
- 2025: René Groebli: Movement, Bildhalle, Zürich, Switzerland
