= Groebli =

Groebli is a surname of Swiss origin. Notable people with the surname include:

- René Groebli (1927–2026), Swiss photographer
- Werner Groebli (1915–2008), half of the figure-skating duo Frick and Frack
