= Gotthard Schuh =

Swiss photographer (1897–1969)

- Born: 22 December 1897; Berlin-Schöneberg, Germany
- Died: 29 December 1969 (aged 72); Küsnacht, Switzerland
- Education: autodidact
- Known for: Photography, painting
- Spouse(s): Marga Zürcher, Annamarie Custer
- Awards: 1957: Venice Gold Medal, 1967: Appointed Cavaliere (Italy)

Gotthard Schuh (22 December 1897 – 29 December 1969) was a Swiss photographer, painter and graphic artist.

== Early life and education ==
Gotthard Schuh was born in Berlin-Schöneberg to Swiss parents, the son of engineer Christian Heinrich Schuh. In 1902 the family moved to Aarau, where he attended elementary school and from 1914 the local high school. He began to paint and Otto Wyler was his first teacher. In 1916 he graduated from the trade school in Basel. During WW1 from 1917 Schuh was drafted into the border service as a soldier.

== Painter ==
From 1919 he lived as a painter in Basel and Geneva. After a long trip to Italy in 1920, he settled in Munich as a painter. In 1926 he returned to Switzerland and set up a photography business, and in 1927 married Marga Zürcher from St. Gallen with whom he had a son Kaspar (* 1934). He moved to Zürich and from 1928 to 1931 held exhibitions of painting and joined the Basel artist group "Rot-Blau".

== Photographer ==
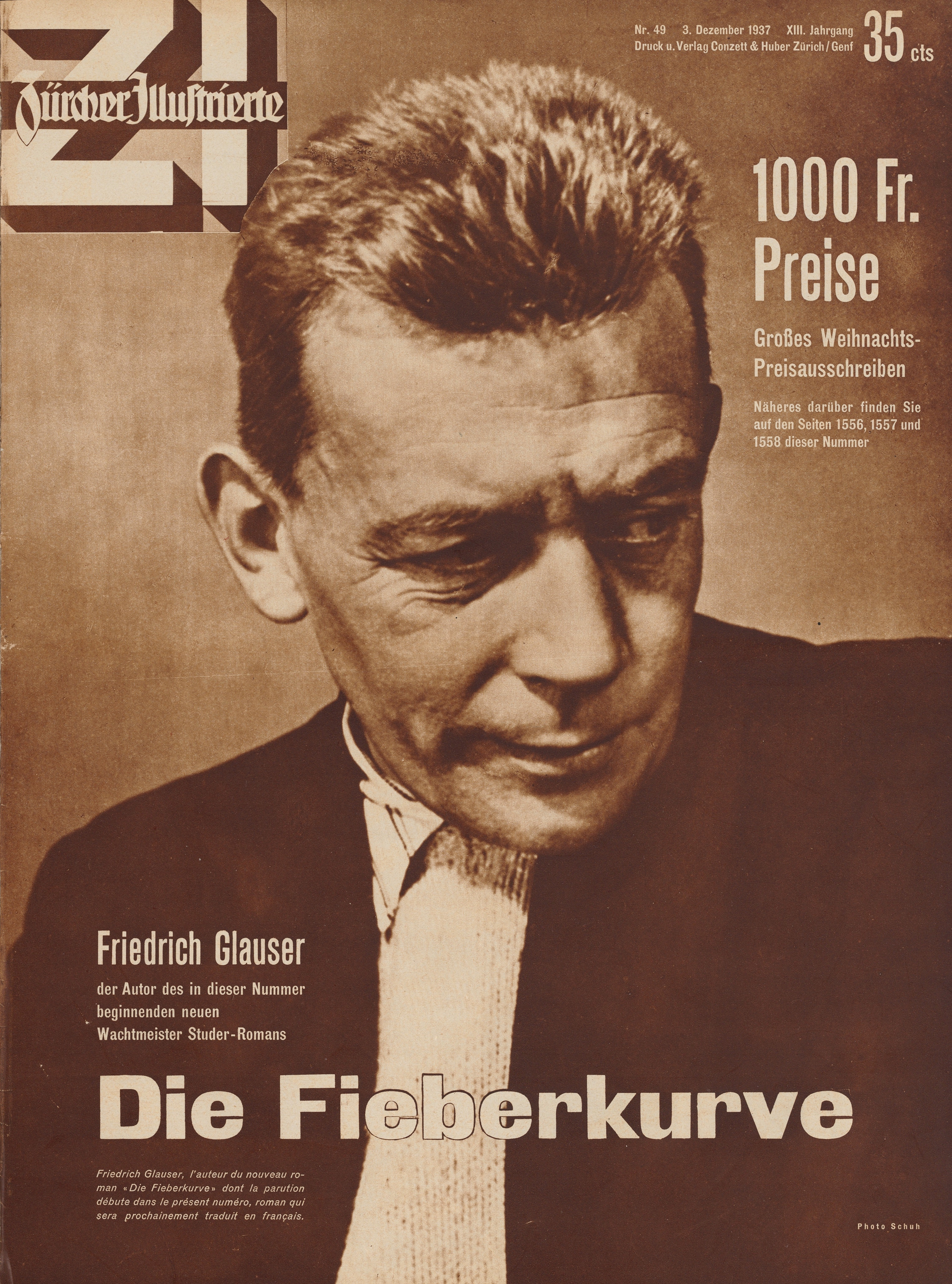
Gotthard Schuh, portrait photograph of Swiss author Friedrich Glauser, Zürcher Illustrierte, vol. 13, no. 49 (December 3, 1937), cover page.

In 1931 his first photos were published in a Zürich magazine and in 1932 he held a photography exhibition in Paris, where he met Picasso, Léger and Braque.

From 1932 he joined the Zürcher Illustrierte under Arnold Kübler, working with Hans Staub and Paul Senn, and until 1937 Schuh also worked freelance for Berliner Illustrirte Zeitung, Paris Match and Life. His assignments during 1938/1939 took him all over Europe and to Indonesia. He and Marga divorced in 1939.

After about ten years as a reporter he became the first picture editor for the Neue Zürcher Zeitung. He and Edwin Arnet created the NZZ supplement Das Wochenende, which showcased Swiss and international photography in addition to his own reportage.

From this period a significant part of his own photographic work illustrated books, of which the most successful was Inseln der Götter published in 1941, the result of his almost 11-month journey through Singapore, Java, Sumatra and Bali, undertaken just before the war. It was a mixture of reportage and self-reflection, with a poetic quality that, though individual images may be read either way, Schuh sometimes valued over documentary authenticity:

“Everyone just depicts what he sees, and everyone just sees what corresponds to his being.”

This is evident in the book Begegnungen which Schuh published in 1956, in which he combined older and more recent images in free association, in accord with the objectives of the ‘Kollegium Schweizerischer Photographen’, the Academy of Swiss Photographers which he founded together with Paul Senn, Walter Läubli, Werner Bischof and Jakob Tuggener, a loose group that promoted an ‘auteur’ emphasis. Their first exhibition in 1951 marked a renewal of photography in Switzerland after the conservatism and nationalism of the war years. Critic Edwin Arnet identified the ethos of the group:

"Their photography has abandoned the sphere of technical experimentation ..., the abstract and the avant-garde. It has become more wholesome, concentrating again more on the poetry of real things'.

In 1955 Edward Steichen selected two of Schuh's photographs for the world-touring Museum of Modern Art exhibition The Family of Man seen by an audience of 9 million. One, taken in Italy, is a stolen image of lovers resting beside their discarded bicycles amongst long summer grass in an olive grove, while the other, taken in Java, shows a boy stretching balletically across the pavement as he plays marbles.

== Later life ==
In 1944 Schuh married Annamarie Custer with whom he had two daughters, Claudia and Sybille. After 1960, he returned to painting.

Gotthard Schuh died in 1969 in Küsnacht on Lake Zurich. Fotostiftung Schweiz administers the rights to Schuh's images, hosting photographs by Schuh on the online database of Keystone AG, Zürich, for public use.

== Exhibitions ==
- Helmhaus, Zürich, 2 September – 1 October 1967
- Kunsthaus Zürich, 19 June – 29 August 1982
- Museum of Design Basel, 4 February – 16 March 1986
- Swiss Photo Foundation, Winterthur, 30 May – 11 October 2009
- Musee Niépce, Chalon sur Saône, 27 February – 30 May 2010
- Villa dei Cedri, Bellinzona, 18 July - 31 October 2010
- Fundacion Mapfre, Instituto de Cultura Madrid, 13 December 2011 – 19 February 2012
- Artef, Gallery for Art Photography Zürich, 13 September 2012 – 17 November 2012

== Publications ==
- Schuh, Gotthard; Gasser, Martin, 1955-, (author.); Mora, Gilles, 1945-, (author,); Pfrunder, Peter, (author,); Stiftung für die Photographie (Switzerland) (host institution.); Musée Nicéphore Nièpce (Charleroi) (host institution.) (2009), Gotthard Schuh : a kind of infatuation, Steidl; London : Thames & Hudson [distributor], ISBN 978-3-86521-830-8
- Schuh, Gotthard; Streiff, David (1982), Gotthard Schuh : Photographien aus den Jahren 1929-1963, Benteli, ISBN 978-3-7165-0405-5
- Schuh, Gotthard; Gasser, Martin, 1955-; Magnaguagno, Guido; Mora, Gilles, 1945-; Pfrunder, Peter; Fundacion Mapfre; Stiftung fur die Photographie (Switzerland) (2011), Gotthard Schuh, TF Editores, ISBN 978-84-15253-02-0
- Schuh, Gotthard (1941), Inseln der Götter : Java, Sumatra, Bali, Morgarten-verlag
- Schuh, Gotthard; Campione, Francesco; Pfrunder, Peter; Ragno, Gian Franco; Museo delle culture extraeuropee (Lugano, Switzerland) (2006), L'isola degli dèi Bali nell'opera di Gotthard Schuh, 25 Novembre 2006 - 1 Aprile 2007 = the Island of the gods, Bali in the work of Gotthard Schuh, 25 November 2006 - 1 April 2007, Edizione MCEL, ISBN 978-88-7777-026-4
- Schuh, Gotthard (1956), Instants volés, instants donnés, [Guilde du livre
- Schuh, Gotthard (1935), Zürich, Oprecht
- Price, David; Schuh, Gotthard, 1897-1969 (1983), The other Italy, Olive, ISBN 978-0-946889-01-3
- Schuh, Gotthard; Arnet, Edwin, 1901-1962 (1941), Tirggel : ein altes Weihnachtsgebäck, Amstutz & Herdeg

== Awards ==
- 1957: Venice Gold Medal
- 1967: Appointed Cavaliere (Italy)

== Bibliography ==
- Champeau, Albert (1976), "Créatis : pour une photographie au présent", Creatis, PUBLICO, ISSN 0399-7596
- Walter Kern: Der Maler Gotthard Schuh In: Architektur und Kunst, Vol. 18, 1931, S. 17–24
- Annamarie Schuh-Custer: Der Photograph Gotthard Schuh In: Aarauer Neujahrsblätter, Vol. 57, 1983, S. 57–65
- Peter Pfrunder (2007). "Schuh, Gotthard". Neue Deutsche Biographie (in German). Vol. 23. Berlin: Duncker & Humblot. pp. 671–672. (full text online).
- Gotthard Schuh, Frühe Photographien 1929–1939. Arche, Zürich 1967.
- Ein Zeitbild: 1930–1950; Paul Senn, Hans Staub, Gotthard Schuh, drei Schweizer Photoreporter. Benteli, Bern 1986, ISBN 3-7165-0536-6.
- Gotthard Schuh, Photographien aus den Jahren 1929–1963. Benteli, Bern 1983.
- Gotthard Schuh, Eine Art Verliebtheit. Peter Pfrunder (Hg.). Steidl, Göttingen 2009, ISBN 978-3-86521-886-5.
