= Marie Meierhofer =

Swiss children's psychiatrist and pedagogue

Maria Berta Magdalena Meierhofer (1909–1998) was a Swiss children's psychiatrist and pedagogue. She was one of the early supporters of the Pestalozzi Children's Village and is known for the Marie Meierhofer Institute for Children.

== Early life ==
Marie Meierhofer was born on 21 June 1909 in a hospital in Zürich. She grew up in Turgi, Canton Aargau as the daughter of Albert Meierhofer, the founder of Bronzewarenfabrik AG Turgi and the artist Marie Lang, the second wife of Albert. She had five siblings, but her younger brother Robert died when she was eight. The families home, the "Little Appletree" was situated in an orchard and had a central heating and running water in all bed chambers which was very modern for the time.

== Education ==
She was one of the first female students in the high school of Turgi, which only opened in 1921. In April 1930, Marie Meierhofer and her family moved to Zurich. But after her father became ill and upon the advice of the medic Maximilian Bircher-Benner, he agreed to her medical studies, which she began at the University of Zürich. Meierhofer also studied in Rome and Vienna, and graduated in 1935. Following, she worked for three years in the psychiatric hospital Bürghölzli in Zürich after which she presented her doctoral dissertation in 1937. In 1938 she obtained her Doctorate following which she worked at the Children's Hospital in Zurich from 1939 until 1942.

== Professional life ==
During World War II and on behalf of the Swiss Red Cross, Marie Meierhofer cared for war-affected children in Cruseilles in 1942/43 and in Caen in 1945, both in France. Children of Jewish descent and older young people had to be hidden from the Nazi. She smuggled medicine and food across the green border to France.

Meierhofer and Walter Corti discussed ways to educate the children surviving World War II, following which she became one of the early and main supporters for the founding of the Pestalozzi Children's Village in Trogen in 1946. Meierhofer had a leading role in the development of the educational plan for the village.

Between 1948 and 1952 Marie Meierhofer was the city doctor of Zurich. At that time, she encountered the nurseries and orphanages she wanted to build and was not satisfied with how the children were treated. After she resigned from her job in Zurich and upon invitation by the UNESCO followed up on her studies in France and the United States. It is because of Marie Meierhofer's initiative that the "Institute for Psychohygiene in Childhood" was founded in 1957, and is called the "Marie Meierhofer Institute for Children" since 1977.

== Research ==
Between 1958 and 1961 and from 1971 to 1974 Meierhofer conducted research that showed a cognitive deficient development of children that grew up in state owned institutions compared to children who grew up in families. Meierhofer also produced a documentary on her research on over three-hundred children from twelve orphanages in Zurich.

== Personal life ==
She had five siblings, of which Hans was from Alberts first wife and Eduard and Adèle were foster children. She had two younger sisters called Emmi and Albertine but lost her brother Robert through death at the age of eight. Marie wasn't home when Robert drowned in the pool. From that day on, however, she felt somehow responsible for the tragic death. Her lifelong effort to help disadvantaged children was greatly enhanced by this event. When Marie Meierhofer was 16, her mother died in a plane crash, and at the age of 22 she lost her father, who died on a white water rafting trip, in the river Ticino at the age of sixty-eight. Meierhofer had an adoptive son Edgar, who was one of her patients. Edgar died at the age of 26 from a congenital kidney disease. She died on the 15 August 1998 in Unterägeri in Canton Zug and was buried in the cemetery in Turgi.
