= Pestalozzi International =

Educational charitable organisation

- Abbreviation: PI
- Formation: 1957
- Legal status: Charity
- Purpose: Pestalozzi supports high achieving, but low income, students from some of the most disadvantaged communities in the world.
- Location: Unit F8 Worth Corner Business Centre, Crawley, Sussex, RH10 7SL
- Coordinates: 53°39′42″N 2°39′7″W
- Region served: India, Nepal, Zambia, Zimbabwe, Uganda, Tibet, Indonesia, Bhutan and Belize
- Website: www.pestalozzi.international

Pestalozzi International is an educational charitable organisation based in East Sussex, England. It was formed by a 2024 merger between the Pestalozzi International Foundation (formerly called Pestalozzi Children's Village Trust and then Pestalozzi International Village Trust) and Pestalozzi World Children's Trust.

== Overview ==
The Pestalozzi Children's Village (German: Kinderdorf Pestalozzi) was established in Trogen, Switzerland, in 1946, after the Second World War, to accommodate and educate children from both sides of the war. The concept soon spread to other countries, and in the UK the Pestalozzi Children Village was opened. The charity was named after a Swiss educationalist called Johann Heinrich Pestalozzi who believed in educating the heart, hands and head as a complete educational system. Pestalozzi Village initially offered children vocational courses to equip them with skills from agriculture to carpentry.

From 2019, Pestalozzi International Village UK sponsored students from developing countries to study the International Baccalaureate Diploma programme and then A Levels at Sussex Coast College Hastings, (formerly called Hastings College of Arts and Technology) in St Leonards-on-Sea. From 2016 – 2019 students attended Claremont School in Bodiam. The charity relied on contributions from the public government bodies and individuals.

== History ==
Pestalozzi International Foundation was an educational charity based in St Leonards-on-Sea, East Sussex, England. The charity was founded in the UK in 1957 to support the Pestalozzi Swiss Village in Switzerland. The Pestalozzi Village was built on a 170-acre (0.69 km^{2}) estate in Sedlescombe, UK and opened in 1959. 40 children between the ages of 10 and 18 from 15 European countries were accommodated and educated according to the principles of Swiss educationalist Johann Heinrich Pestalozzi. Children were educated in local schools in Hastings and St Leonards-on-Sea. In later years, the charity's focus changed to providing educational opportunities for young people aged 16 to 19 who are academically bright, but financially disadvantaged. Pestalozzi Scholars initially studied the International Baccalaureate Diploma at Sussex Coast College Hastings, living and learning together. While at the Village, scholars participated in outreach and other programmes in the community. From 2016 – 2019, some of the Pestalozzi Scholars attended Claremont Sixth Form to study A Levels.

== Educational programme ==
In September 2019, the scholarship programme evolved and Pestalozzi worked in partnership with United World Colleges. The Pestalozzi-UWC scholars now attend UWC Atlantic in Wales and UWC in Mostar in Bosnia and Herzegovina, where they studied the International Baccalaureate Diploma course.

== 2024 Merger with Pestalozzi World Children's Trust ==
On the 13th September 2024 Pestalozzi International Foundation merged with Pestalozzi World Children's Trust, which renamed to Pestalozzi International. Pestalozzi International provides child-centred education to children in the Global South through a variety of programmes.

== Patron and management ==
The Duke of Gloucester GCVO is the Patron of Pestalozzi International Foundation. The Foundation is headed by a Chair of Trustees.
