= René Burri =

Swiss photographer (1933–2014)

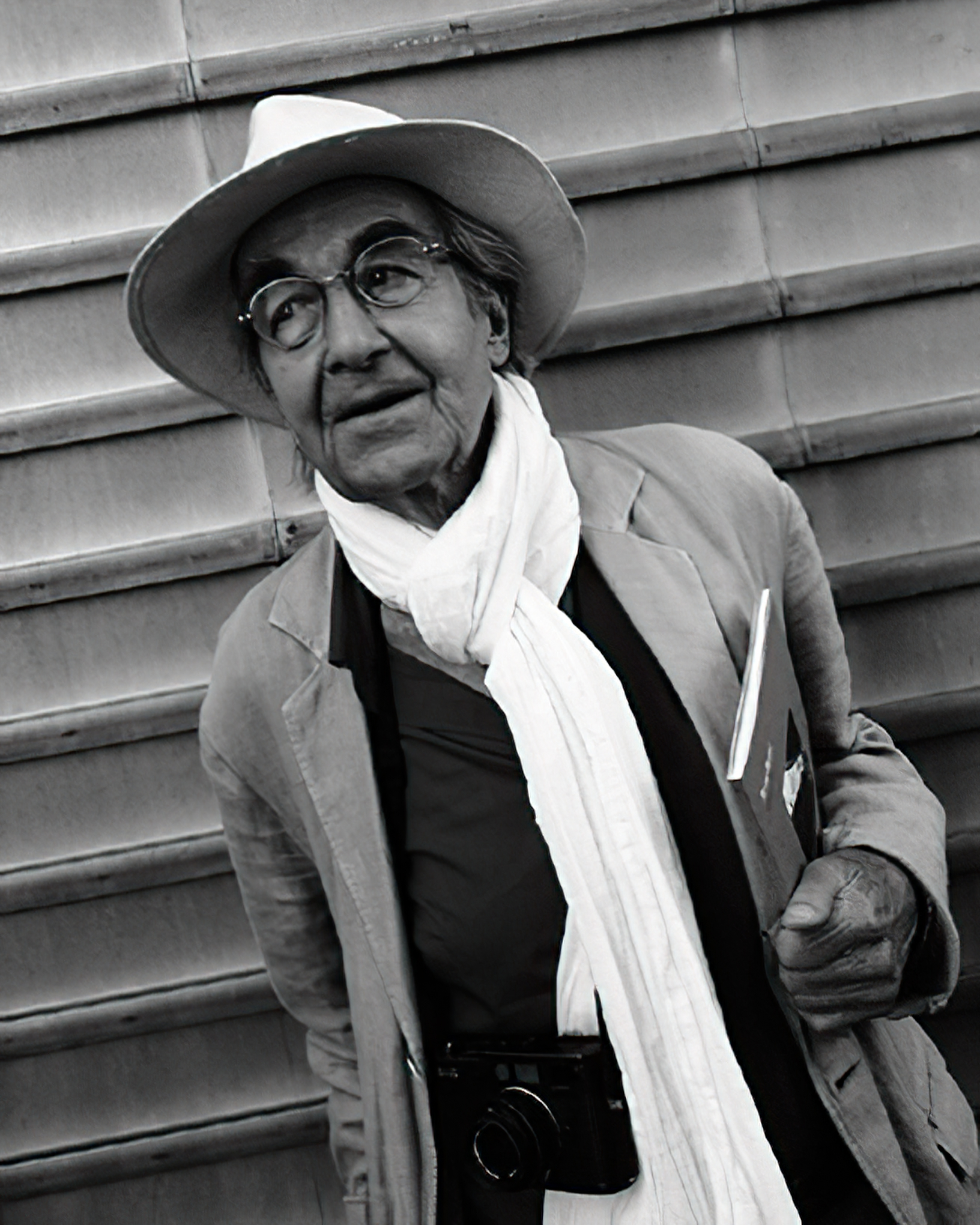
- Burri in 2010
- Born: 9 April 1933; Zurich, Switzerland
- Died: 20 October 2014 (aged 81); Zurich, Switzerland
- Occupation: Photographer
- René Burri's voice from the BBC programme Front Row, 23 April 2013

René Burri (9 April 1933 – 20 October 2014) was a Swiss photographer. Burri was a member of Magnum Photos and photographed major political, historical and cultural events and key figures of the second half of the 20th century. He made portraits of Che Guevara and Pablo Picasso as well as iconic pictures of São Paulo and Brasília.

== Life and work ==
Burri studied at the Kunstgewerbeschule Zürich from 1949 to 1953, where he worked under Hans Finsler, Alfred Willimann and Johannes Itten. From 1953 to 1955 he began working as a documentary filmmaker while completing military service. During this time he also began working with Leica cameras. Then he worked for Disney as a cameraman until 1955. From 1956 to 1959 he traveled extensively to places including Turkey, Egypt, Syria, Iraq, Jordan, Lebanon, Italy, France, Spain, Greece, Brazil, and Japan, which led to publications in Life, Look, Stern, Paris-Match, Réalités, Epoca, and New York Times, as well as a photographic essay "El Gaucho" which appeared in Du.

Burri first began working with Magnum Photos in 1955 through Werner Bischof, becoming a full member in 1959 and being elected chair of Magnum France in 1982. His first report "Touch of Music for the Deaf" on deaf-mute children was published by Life. In 1965 he assisted with the creation of Magnum Films which led to his work on the Magnum-BBC joint production of The Two Faces of China (1968). In 1967 he produced a documentary on the Six-Day War in Jerusalem for German television. He produced the film Jean Tinguely in 1972.

In 1963 Burri was working in Cuba when he was able to photograph the revolutionary Che Guevara; these images of Guevara smoking a cigar have become iconic. Notably, after taking the photos, Burri remembers Guevara "scaring the hell out of him". Describing a situation where an angry Che was pacing his tiny office like "a caged tiger", while being interviewed by an American woman from Look. While "hectoring" the reporter and "chomping on his cigar", Che suddenly looked Burri straight in the eye and told him "if I catch up with your friend Andy, I'll cut his throat" (while slowly drawing his finger across his neck). Andy was Andrew St. George, a fellow Magnum photographer, who had travelled with Che in the Sierra Maestra, and then later filed reports for American intelligence.

Burri died of cancer on 20 October 2014, aged 81 .

== Publications ==
- Die Deutschen (The Germans).
- Zürich: Fretz & Wasmuth, 1962. Texts by various authors selected by Hans Bender. German-language version.
- Les Allemands. Paris: Delpire, 1963. Encyclopédie Essentielle. Text by Jean Baudrillard. French-language version.
- Die Deutschen – Photographien 1957-1964. Schirmer/Mosel, 1986; 1990; 1999. Text by Hans Magnus Enzensberger. German-language version.

== Awards ==
- 1998: Dr. Erich Salomon Award, German Society for Photography (DGPh)
- 1999: Canton of Zurich cultural prize
- 2006: Honorary Fellowship of The Royal Photographic Society

== Exhibitions (Selection) ==
Documented exhibitions

- 1966: China, Galerie Form, Zurich.
- 1967: René Burri Retrospective, Art Institute of Chicago, Chicago.
- 1971: 50 Photographies de René Burri, Galerie Rencontre, Paris.
- 1972: René Burri Retrospective, Raffi Photo Gallery, New York; Il Diaframma, Milan.
- 1980/1981: Die Deutschen, Folkwang Museum, Essen; Galerie Rudolf Kicken, Cologne; Galerie Nagel, Berlin.
- 1984/1985: One World, Kunsthaus Zürich, Zurich; Berner Photo-Galerie, Berne; Centre national de la photographie and the Palais de Tokyo, Paris; Musée des arts décoratifs, Lausanne; also in New Delhi, Havana, New York, Bratislava and Ostrava, 1985–1995.
- 1987: Dans la familiarité de Corbu, Musée de l'Élysée, Lausanne.
- 1987: An American Dream, International Center of Photography, New York.
- 1988 : Magnum en Chine, Rencontres d'Arles festival, Arles, France.
- 1994: Dialogue avec Le Corbusier, Museo de arte moderno de Medellàn, Medellàn; Curitiba, São Paulo, Rio de Janeiro, Brazil, 1995; Lima, 1995.
- 1995: Le Paris de René Burri, Centre Culturel Suisse, Paris.
- 1997: Che, Fnac-Forum, Paris; Galerie R. Mangisch, Zurich; also in Barcelona, Lille and Lisbon, 1997–2001.
- 1998: 77 Strange Sensations, Villa Tobler, Zurich.
- 1998: Die Deutschen, Fotografie Forum International, Frankfurt; also in Kaufbeuren, Velbert, Toulouse and Burghausen, 1998–2003.
- 2002: Berner Blitz, Galerie Karrer, Zurich.
- 2004: René Burri - Rétrospective 1950-2000, Maison Européenne de la Photographie, Paris; Musée de l’Elysée, Paris; Ausstellungsraum Klingental, Basel; Lausanne, Switzerland; Milan, 2005; Zurich, 20005.
- 2005: René Burri: Utopia - Architecture et Architecte, Hermès Gallery, Hermès, New York; Leica Gallery, Prague.
- 2005: René Burri: Photos de Jean Tinguely & Cie, Musée Tinguely, Basel.
- 2010: I tedeschi. La Germania degli anni Sessanta nelle fotografie di René Burri, Galleria Sagittaria, Centro Iniziative Culturali Pordenone, Pordenone, Italy.
- 2014: Doppelleben, OstLicht, Vienna.
- 2016: Tre Oci, Venice, Italy
- 2024 – "Attitüde", Fabian & Claude Walter Galerie, Zurich
