= Jakob Tuggener =

Swiss photographer, filmmaker and painter

Jakob Tuggener (7 February 1904, Zurich – 29 April 1988) was a Swiss photographer, filmmaker and painter.

== Early life, education and training ==
Son of Jacob Arnold, lithographer, and Anna Barbara Sennhauser, Jakob Tuggener took his first photographs in 1926 and taught himself the medium. He was apprenticed as a technical draftsman at Maag Zahnräder AG Zurich, Switzerland before studying in Berlin 1930–1931 at the Reimann School, then the largest private arts and crafts school in Germany, in graphics, typography, drawing, shop window design and film. His works were published in the college magazine Farbe und Form (Colour and Form).

== Two themes ==
After returning to Switzerland, Tuggener worked as an industrial photographer for the Maschinenfabrik Oerlikon, and his work was published regularly in the in-house magazine Der Gleichrichter. In 1932 he established his own business and in 1934, he produced his first commissioned book, MFO, a portrait of the Maschinenfabrik Oerlikon, and afterwards bought a Leica camera and photographed for the first time at the Grand Ball in Zurich. After experiencing the glories of night-life at the then famous balls held by the Reimann School at which he trained in photography, these extravagant society events obsessed and enchanted Tuggener, with their “alabaster light” illuminating a “fairy tale of women and flowing silk” and they were a subject to which he returned to document for two decades; over the 30s to the 50s he photographed the soirées in hotels like the Palace in St. Moritz, the Baur au Lac and the Dolder Grand Hotel & Curhaus and the Vienna Opera Ball. In addition, he devoted himself to topics such as country life and technology and in 1937 was engaged in filmmaking; and from 1937 to 1970, in addition to commissioned films for industry, he produced many self-financed films, initially in collaboration with Max Wydler. From 1939 to 1944 he undertook military service in the Swiss canton Aargau and the Bernese Seeland and was a guard in an internment camp for Polish soldiers and officers, with whom he formed friendships. In 1940 he married Marie Gassler.

== Fabrik ==
In 1943, Tuggener's book Fabrik: Ein Bildepos der Technik, a photographic essay on the relationship between man and industry, though not a commercial success, represented, in its filmic sequencing and absence of text (like one of his own silent films), an avant-garde breakthrough in Swiss photography.

In 1950 he married his second wife, Margrit Aschwanden, a photographer and daughter of Michael Aschwanden.

== Recognition ==
In 1949, the new editor of Camera magazine, Walter Laubli (1902–1991), published a substantial portfolio of Jakob Tuggener's pictures made at upper-class entertainments and in factories, a world familiar to him from his early apprenticeship as a technical draftsman in Zurich, as well as a series of stills from his silent films, with an introduction by Hans Kasser (1907–1978), himself a photographer and member of the Werkbund. Alongside Tuggener’s work, Camera presented the 25-year-old Robert Frank, who had just returned to his native Switzerland after two years abroad, with pages including some of his first pictures from New York. The magazine promoted the two as representatives of the ‘new photography’ of Switzerland.

Tuggener was a role model for Frank, first mentioned to him by his boss and mentor, Zurich commercial photographer Michael Wolgensinger (1913–1990). Tuggener, as a serious artist who had left the commercial world behind, was the “one Frank really did love, from among all Swiss photographers,” according to Guido Magnaguagno and Fabrik, as a photo book, was a model for Frank’s Les Américains published in Paris by Delpire in 1958.

In 1951 Tuggener founded the Kollegium Schweizerischer Photographen (Academy of Swiss Photographers) with Werner Bischof, Walter Läubli, Gotthard Schuh and Paul Senn. In 1953 he was included in Postwar European Photography at the Museum of Modern Art, New York; then in 1955 two of his photographs, one from each of his two main themes, dance and work (Riveters at the Rheiner Hafen in Basel, from Schwarzes Eisen and / or Die Maschinenzeit, 1947) were selected by Edward Steichen to be shown in the world-touring MoMA exhibition The Family of Man seen by 9 million visitors, and he was published, inter alia, in the magazine of Leica photography, Du. He was awarded a Gold Medal at the 1st International Photo Biennale, 1957. Tuggener was shown once again at MoMA in Photographs from the Museum Collection of 1958. The first big complete exhibition, Feine Feste, of his 'Ballnächte' pictures took place in 1969 in Munich. His camera was his entrée to this privileged universe, otherwise denied to a man of his middle-class origins who lived like a hermit.

In 1971 Tuggener married his third wife Maria Euphemia Baumgartner, a remedial teacher.

== Legacy ==
At 80, Tuggener received the “Award for Cultural Merit” from the city of Zurich in 1983. He died in 1988, aged 84 and leaving an immense catalogue of a life's work, much of which has yet to be shown: more than 60 book maquettes, thousands of photographs, drawings, watercolors, oil paintings and silent film.

His photographic archive is in the Fotostiftung Schweiz in the photography centre in Winterthur.

== Select exhibitions ==
- 2017-18 Fotostiftung Schweiz, Winterthur/Schweiz: Maschinenzeit.
- 2006 Museum Hermesvilla, Vienna: Ballnächte.
- 2004–2005 Jakob Tuggener: Ballnächte Fotostiftung Schweiz, Winterthur, Switzerland (solo)
- 1994 Industriebild Fotomuseum Winterthur, Switzerland
- 1981–1982 Tuggeners Bücher Kunsthaus Zürich, Switzerland (solo)
- 1980 Jakob Tuggener/August Sander Work Gallery, Zurich, Switzerland
- 1978 Jakob Tuggener. Photographien Stadthaus Uster, Switzerland (solo)
- 1974 Jakob Tuggener. Fotografien 1930 bis heute Helmhaus Zurich and the Museum der Stadt Solothurn, Switzerland (solo)
- 1969–1970 Feine Feste Die Neue Sammlung, Staatliches Museum für angewandte Kunst, Munich, Germany (solo)
- 1958 Photographs from the Museum Collection Museum of Modern Art, New York, USA
- 1955 The Family of Man Museum of Modern Art, New York, USA
- 1953 Postwar European Photography Museum of Modern Art, New York, USA
- 1951 Kollegium Schweizerischer Photographen Helmhaus Zürich, Switzerland

== Publications ==
- Fotografien. Kunsthaus Zürich. Jakob-Tuggener-Stiftung, 2000.
- Ballnächte/Ballnights 1934–1950. Scalo Verlag, 2005.
- Fabrik. Reprint of the original from 1943. Steidl, 2012.
- Zürcher Oberland, Verlag Buchdruckerei Wetzikon und Rüti, Wetzikon.

== Films ==
- 1937 Flugmeeting (Dübendorf)
- 1937-1940 Zürich Stadt und Land
- 1938 Abbruch der Tonhalle
- 1938-1970 Die Maschinenzeit
- 1942 Rosmarie
- 1943 Die Schiffmaschine
- 1943 Wir fordern
- 1944 Die Seemühle
- 1946 Der Weg aus Eden
- 1947 Dazio Grande
- 1948 Uerikon-Bauma Bahn
- 1952 Die Strassenbahnen im Kt. Zug
- 1953 Hyronimus
- 1954 Illusion
- 1957 Die Muse
- 1959 Das Grab des Kelten
- 1960 Palace Hotel, St. Moritz
- 1961 Dornröschen
- 1960-1962 Wien, nur Du allein
- 1962 Mortimer
- 1963 Die Versuchung des hl. Antonius
- 1963 Die Holzfäller
- 1967 Ciel naïf
- 1970 Robert Niederer, der Glasbläser.
