= East Sussex College =

College in East Sussex, UK

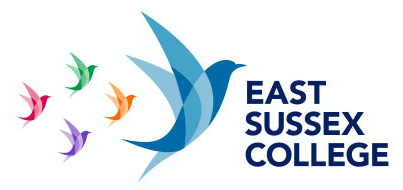
- East Sussex College logo

Location
- Headquarters: Cross Levels Way; Eastbourne, East Sussex, BN21 2UF; United Kingdom; 50.788°N 0.271°E

Information
- Former names: Sussex Downs College: Lewes Tertiary College; Eastbourne College of Arts and Technology; Park College, Eastbourne; Sussex Coast College Hastings: Hastings College of Arts and Technology
- Motto: "Putting Students First"
- Established: November 2018
- Ofsted: Reports
- Staff: 1,000
- Gender: Co-educational
- Age: 16+
- Enrolment: 5,000 full time; 10,000 part time
- Language: English
- Campus: Eastbourne, Lewes, Hastings, Newhaven
- Campus type: Urban
- Colour: Blue shades
- Athletics: Football, tennis, track & field
- Nickname: ESC
- Budget: £35m
- Revenue: £35m
- Website: http://www.escg.ac.uk

East Sussex College or East Sussex College Group is the largest higher education college in East Sussex, providing education and training from foundation to degree level. The college educates almost half of the county's young people and over 8,000 adults each year at campuses in Lewes, Eastbourne, Hastings and Newhaven, and in the workplace.

Sussex Downs College, itself created from colleges in Eastbourne and Lewes, merged with Sussex Coast College in 2018 to form the East Sussex College Group (ESCG).

East Sussex College is a provider of work based further education and apprenticeships in these areas.

== History ==
The college traces its roots back via the four original institutions: one in Hastings, two in Eastbourne and one in Lewes:

- Lewes Tertiary College, created in 1989 when Priory School, Lewes sixth form (using the former Lewes County Grammar School for Boys building) and Lewes Technical College merged to create the new institution.
- Park College, Eastbourne, renamed from Eastbourne Sixth Form College in 1994 after incorporation, was created from Eastbourne Grammar School in 1979.
- Eastbourne College of Arts and Technology was renamed in 1987. Before that it was the College of Further Education, Eastbourne (which had until 1957 been the Eastbourne Technical College and before that the Technical Institute, Eastbourne). In 1980 it merged with The College of Art and Design, Eastbourne which was in turn formerly known as the Eastbourne School of Arts and Crafts; around 1962 it acquired 'Eversley Court', St Anne's Road (formerly used by Ascham House Gentlemen's School).
- Sussex Coast College Hastings was established under the name Hastings College of Arts and Technology in 1982 but can trace its roots back to Hastings College of Further Education, created in 1968, and the School of Science and Art, Hastings which was established in 1875 and was taken over by Hastings County Borough in March 1895.

=== Merger with Lewes Tertiary College and Eastbourne College of Arts and Technology ===
Sussex Downs College was established in 2001 through a merger of Lewes Tertiary College and Eastbourne College of Arts and Technology.

=== Takeover of Park College ===
Park College was taken over in 2003

=== Merger with Sussex Downs College and Sussex Coast College ===
In 2017 it was announced that there would be a further merger and reorganisation, to create the East Sussex College Group across several campuses and a wider area. On 18 April 2018, it was announced that the merger had been completed.

In 2017 the college announced they were planning to merge with Sussex Downs College. Which on 18 April 2018, was announced to have been completed and merged.

== Current campuses ==
East Sussex College, Eastbourne

Cross Levels Way, Eastbourne, East Sussex, BN21 2UF

East Sussex College, Lewes

1 Mountfield Road, Lewes, East Sussex, BN7 2XH

East Sussex College, Newhaven

Marine Workshops, Railway Quay, Newhaven, BN9 0ER

East Sussex College, Hastings Station Plaza

Station Approach, Hastings, East Sussex, TN34 1BA

East Sussex College, Ore Valley

Parker Road, Hastings, East Sussex, TN34 3TT

East Sussex College, Automotive Centre

Unit 17 & 18 Northridge Industrial Estate, Ivyhouse Lane, Haywood Way, Hastings, East Sussex, TN35 4PP

== Courses ==
A variety of part-time and full-time courses are offered at the colleges including A levels, BTECs, apprenticeships and many work based vocational qualifications.

Students can also study at the Sports Academy, Performing Arts Academy and East Sussex Music Academy

== Students ==
East Sussex College offers a wide range of programmes for international students, with learners undertaking anything from one week courses to three years of academic study in preparation for progression to UK universities.

The College has approximately 4,500 full time students under the age of 19 and 10,000+ adult learners.

== Staff ==
The College has more than 1,000 staff. In January 2019, teaching staff went on strike, in response to complaints over low pay, where real pay rates for teaching staff have fallen by 25% between 2009-2019.

In 2018, it was reported that the ex-Principal of Sussex Downs College was paid £200,000 per year and had been placed on gardening leave at a cost of £80,000, while the College expected to post a large annual deficit that year of £1.9m and was also making other staff redundancies.

== Academic results ==
In 2014, Sussex Downs College achieved an overall A-Level pass rate of 97% with almost three quarters of students achieving higher grades of A-C.

55 subject areas achieved 100% pass rates.

== External evaluation ==
In an Ofsted inspection in 2017, Sussex Downs College was rated as 'Requires Improvement'. This grade from Ofsted was the same as their previous inspection.

Four key areas were identified as needing to improve: effectiveness of leadership and management; quality of teaching, learning and assessment; outcomes for learners; and the 16-19 study programmes.

Beacon status from the Learning and Skills Improvement Service.

Artsmark Gold for its creative and performance arts education from Arts Council England.

Awarded the Matrix Standard for advice and support services.

Achieved Investor in Careers status.

Assessed under QAA UK Quality Assured scheme.

Action for Inclusion working together to develop and improve education for learners with learning difficulties and/or disabilities in the FE sector.

== Former Sussex Coast College, Hastings ==
The former Hastings College of Arts and Technology Logo

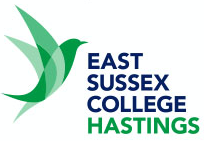
Current East Sussex College, Hastings - Logo

East Sussex College, Hastings is the easterly most campus of the college it was previously called Sussex Coast College Hastings or Hastings College of Arts and Technology (HCAT). It provides general further education for Hastings and the surrounding rural area in Rother District.

The college's main site is at Station Plaza, adjacent to Hastings rail station with a secondary main site in Ore Valley. The college works with local secondary schools to provide vocational courses for year 10 and 11 students, the college also works in partnership with Pestalozzi International Village in Sedlescombe to offer the International Baccalaureate.

=== Station Plaza ===
The Station Plaza building was opened in 2010, costing £97 million. It is situated in the town centre in Station Approach, directly next to Hastings train station, and forms part of a planned redevelopment of the former railway goods yard. An adjacent building, housing shops and medical services have been completed, while planning consent has been obtained on the remainder of the site for a student accommodation building for nearby Brighton University. The college building comprises six floors of accommodation arranged in a triangular configuration, with an atrium extending the full height of the building occupying the centre. This provides some 12,000 square metres of educational facilities, plus the 1,200 square metres atrium social space and 1,600 square metres of uncompleted empty space reserved for future development. Parts of the ground floor are occupied by a Subway franchise restaurant and Costa Coffee. Station Plaza also houses IT suites, a gym, performing arts and dance studios, an art gallery, a training kitchen, a professional hair salon, a restaurant, a learning resource centre and audio-visual / media equipment.

=== Ore Valley ===
The college maintains a secondary site at Ore Valley, less than a mile from Hastings town centre, which was opened in 2010. This has 7,000 square metres of realistic working environments, workshops and ‘live build’ areas, where students build, wire, plumb, fit-out and decorate a full-size house in the central atrium. Students have access to a sports pitch, diner and coffee shop.

This campus houses most of the construction and ICT / Computing courses.

=== Motor Vehicle Centre ===
The Motor Vehicle Training Centre situated in Haywards Way, off the Ridge in Hastings, offers qualifications and hands-on training in all aspects of vehicle maintenance, repair and restoration. The Motor vehicle centre was formerly located in Bexhill but moved to a new location in 2012/13. The new premises were 50% funded by a capital grant from the Skills Funding Agency (SFA). The centre has IMI (Institute of Motor Industry) accreditation and approval to deliver E3 and Levels 1 to 3 motor vehicle maintenance and repair, and apprenticeships at level 2 and 3.

=== Hastings Governance and administration ===
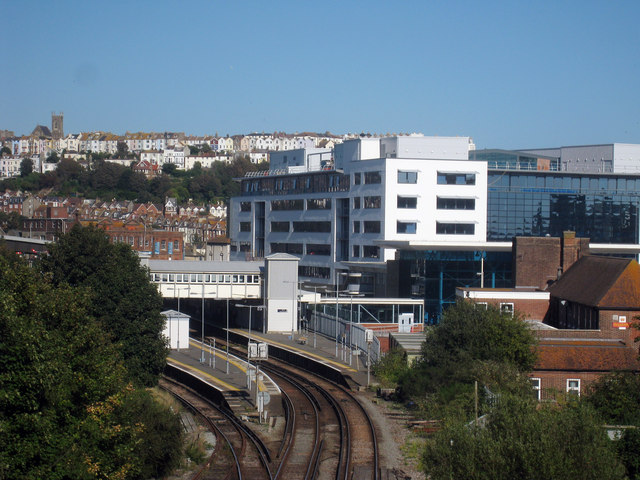
Plaza building seen from across the adjacent Hastings railway station

The college is overseen by a board of governors, known as the Sussex Coast College Hastings Corporation. This has a chairman and deputy chairman, plus eight ordinary members, the college principal, two staff members, two student members and a clerk. The college principal is responsible for everyday management of the college, with a vice principal and deputy principal. Staff and student governors are not permitted to attend all discussions. The chair of the governors is Tony Campbell, and vice chair Pat Farmer. Sarah Connerty, clerk to the governors, is responsible for freedom of information requests made to the college.

College principal from 1998 to 2006 was Julie Walker, during the time that college redevelopment was being planned. From 2006 to 2010 the principal was Sue Middlehurst, covering the period of the college's reorganisation and move to new premises. On her departure, she said, "I was appointed as principal at Hastings College with the goal of transforming the college and improving its reputation. With its inspirational new build, successful, an oversubscribed Academy 6, and significantly improved reputation I hope that I have gone some way to achieving that aim." Her replacement on 1 January 2011 was Janek Patel, who in July that year announced that the college anticipated a 25% cut in its income over the next three years, and the loss of 50 mainly part-time jobs, equivalent to 15 full-time posts. Patel resigned December 2011 following criticisms of leadership and management by OFSTED and was temporarily replaced by Bill Grady, supported by the newly appointed deputy principal April Carrol. The current principal is Clive Cook, appointed 1 April 2012. Cook began his program of restoring the college's finances with a program of job restructuring and 50 redundancies.

Published accounts for 2012/13 show the college to have assets of £78.6 million and annual revenue of £20 million, on which it was roughly breaking even, but accumulated loan debts of £8.4 million and an overdraft facility of £2 million. By early 2014, the overdraft had risen to £2.75 million. The college was given a Financial health notice of concern by the SFA following poor financial results reported for the year to July 2012, requiring it to submit monthly reports for two years, but succeeded in meeting its financial targets in 2012/13 and 2013/14. In March 2014 the governors' finance committee reported: "having got through the Ofsted it was suggested that the College put in dedication and focus on finances to turn the College around financially."

In April 2015, the college put in place plans for further teaching staff cuts of £800,000 or 20,000 hours of teaching time, amounting to some 18% of the total. College management reported that this reduced teaching time in line with the industry average, at a time when funding for FE is falling nationally, and further funding cuts were likely. The college aimed to increase class sizes, currently 'very low', and to timetable more self-directed study. It was noted that despite general cost reductions, admin staff costs had risen 10%. The college aimed to improve its profitability by subcontracting operations and had been downsizing while moving to computer equipment leasing would allow more headroom on the college's overdraft. Settlement agreements would continue to be made with departing staff where that was considered to be in the best interest of the college. The UK National Audit Office reported that almost half of all further education colleges were in deficit in 2013-14.

In 2012/13 the college employed 322 full-time equivalent staff, of whom 186 were teaching staff. Many staff are part-time so the total number of employees is considerably greater.

In 2011 the college formed a wholly owned limited company, Plaza Trading Hastings Ltd, which operates commercial ventures on the site, including the Costa Coffee franchise and the Art Shop.

==== Ofsted Inspection ====
In 2008 Hastings College was inspected and found to have 9,514 students aged over 18, 1,916 in the age group 16-18 full-time and 464 part-time. Grading was on a four-point scale, 1-outstanding, 2-good, 3- satisfactory, 4-inadequate. Overall grades by area were; Effectiveness of provision 3, Capacity to improve 2, Achievement and standards 3, Quality of provision 3, leadership and management 2, equality of opportunity 3. Subject areas were graded individually; Engineering 2 (222 students), Construction 4 (590 students), Information technology 2 (450 students), hair and beauty 2 (350 students), Arts 1 (219 students), literacy numeracy and English for non-native speakers (ESOL) 3 (418 students).

On 25 November 2011 Ofsted inspected Sussex Coast College giving it a Grade 4 (Inadequate). Inspectors returned in January 2013 and found many improvements. The overall grade was moved up to a Grade 3 (Requiring improvement). As of 2014 Ofsted inspection graded Sussex Coast college Hastings grade 2 (Good) for overall effectiveness, outcome for learners and quality of teaching, grade 1 (outstanding) for effectiveness of management.

=== Hastings campus redevelopment ===
In the early 2000s, plans were evolved to reform educational provision in Hastings and more widely in Sussex, for 6th form and older students. These plans called for the development of two sixth form colleges to replace 6th forms attached to individual schools. Other colleges would be sited in Bexhill and Battle. It was decided that one of these would be created within the existing Hastings college and was named 'Academy 6'. The second Hastings college was never created, in part because of resistance by local schools and parents to relinquish their own successful 6th forms. With the advent of compulsory education up to the age of 18, the additional student numbers encouraged schools to expand their own provision. As part of these plans, it was decided to consolidate Hastings college on a new main site at Station Plaza. This also provided a location for an NHS building offering medical services and a hall of residence forming part of the University of Brighton, with other Brighton University premises and an expanded public library nearby.

University Centre Hastings

==== The Archery Ground ====
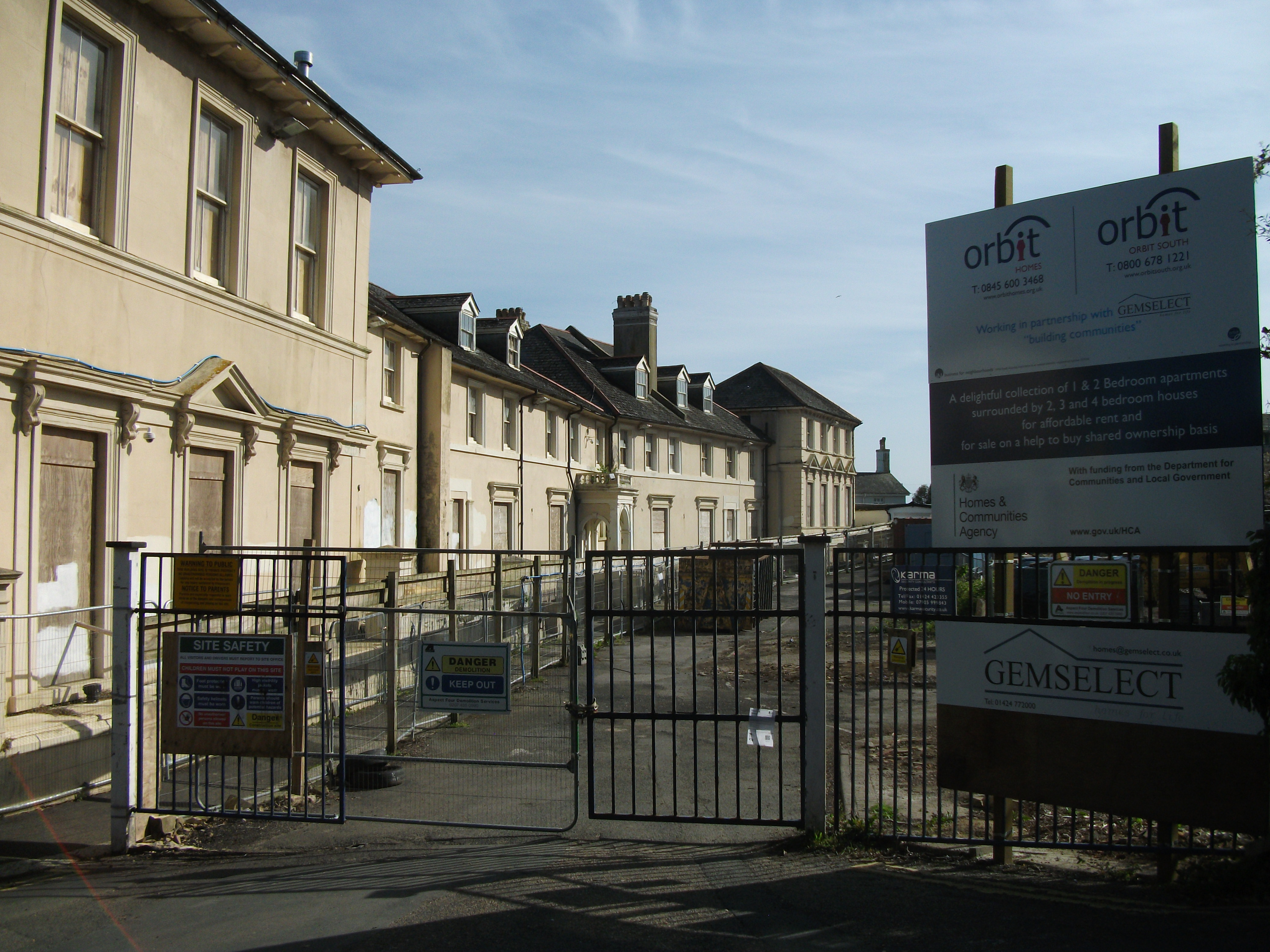
Grade II listed Archery Villas, during redevelopment of the Archery Ground

The main campus of Hastings College was for many years at Archery Road in St. Leonards. Planning applications were made to redevelop this 2.2 hectare site for residential use, as part of an overall plan to move the main college campus to Station Plaza. This experienced considerable difficulties because the largely modern college had been constructed in the centre of James and Decimus Burtons' St Leonards holiday resort development, dating from the 1830s. The college had been built in the 1960s on a site which had been used as a quarry for Burton's building work and then been transformed into a park and formal gardens as part of the original design. It was known as the Archery Ground because of the local archery association which practised there and had as patron Princess, later Queen, Victoria. The distinctly modern college had been built at a time it was not considered necessary to blend in with areas of architectural note, but the redevelopment had to take account of changed planning considerations with regard to preserving architecturally important areas, and numerous objections from local residents.

The college moved out of the premises in 2010, but the initial plan for 163 dwellings was rejected. A plan for 121 dwellings was agreed and planning permission finally obtained in November 2013, but building has yet to start. Plans with further revisions were submitted by the original developers (Gladedale) in February 2015, but control then passed to new developers Gemselect and the Orbit housing association. It was their stated intention to have more 'affordable' housing, leading to planning revisions reducing costs. The site had been subject to vandalism and arson in the years it was unoccupied, but in April 2015 most of the existing buildings were finally demolished by the new developer. The site includes an Original grade II listed building by Burton, Archery Villas in the south, which is to be refurbished and retained.

==== Energy Centre ====
The college opened an energy centre on an industrial estate in Castleham Road in St. Leonards in September 2009. The Energy Centre offered courses such as: ACS (CORGI) accreditation, 17th Edition, PAT testing, Unvented Hot Water, Biomass, Solar Domestic Hot Water, Sustainable Energy for Construction, PV, Water Regulations, Part P, Rainwater Harvesting, Carbon and Energy Management, SMART meters and Solar Thermal for Installers. The energy centre has since closed.

==== Other sites ====
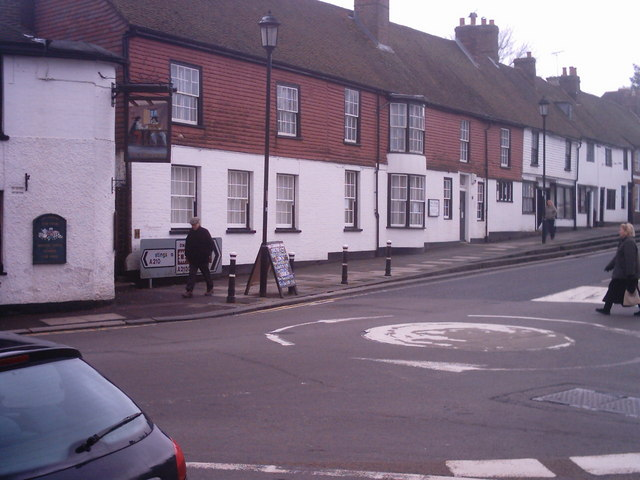
Pyke House, Battle

Sussex Coast College had owned Pyke House in Battle High Street, a listed building left in trust for educational purpose, for 30 years. It was announced in early 2014 that the property had been sold to Claremont School, in accord with the requirements that it be used for educational purposes. The property had been advertised for sale for £500,000. The charity commission agreed to a variation of the original trust, which was for the provision of education within the town of Battle, that this might be provided from the college Plaza campus, and thus that the trust could be used to provide facilities on that site.

The college owned an adult education centre in Lion Street in Rye, which was originally property given to the town for the creation of a school in 1870. In 2002, the college submitted plans to create four residential properties on the site, retaining one room for community use. This attracted considerable objections, both from local users of the community facilities and on principle that Hastings college should benefit from property intended to benefit Rye. The property was sold in 2012 to a local consortium of St Mary's church and the Fletcher community theatre group. St Mary's retained the FE centre for community use, while the old library and art room were converted to form a small two screen cinema, preserving most of the listed building. The college bought the property for a nominal £1 from East Sussex County Council for educational purposes, and sold for estimated £250,000.

In 2010, as part of the consolidation scheme, planning permission was granted to construct 44 homes on the college's former site in St Saviour's Road, St. Leonards, which had housed the new 'Academy 6' A-level department, opened in 2007.

== Former Sussex Downs College ==
Sussex Downs College

Location
- Headquarters: Cross Levels Way; Eastbourne, East Sussex, BN21 2UF; United Kingdom

Information
- Motto: "Putting Students First"
- Established: November 2001
- Closed: March 2018
- Ofsted: Reports
- Staff: 1,000
- Enrolment: 5,000 full time; 10,000 part time
- Campus: Eastbourne, Lewes, Newhaven
- Colour: Blue shades
- Athletics: Football, tennis, track & field
- Nickname: SDC
- Revenue: £35m

Sussex downs college was created in 2001 by the merger of Lewes Tertiary College and Eastbourne College for arts and Technology.

The college became the largest institution in East Sussex for further education running adult education international courses at their then three main sites Eastbourne, Lewes and Newhaven.

2003 the college took over neighbouring Park College, Eastbourne, which had got into financial difficulties and was forced to merge by then Learning Skills Council.

=== Former Lewes Tertiary College ===
The Lewes Campus was originally two institutions. The sixth-form of the local secondary school Priory School, Lewes and Lewes Technical College. They merged in 1989 to form the Lewes Tertiary College.

The college retained its Technical College buildings on Mountfield Road, Lewes and added the buildings across the road which has been part of the former Lewes County Grammar School for Boys site excluding the chapel which Priory School retained.

By merger the college has grown to campus in Newhaven for adult education, an international school and residence at Caburn House to the East of the site opposite the Leisure Centre and a dedicated sixth form college brand which continued in the new Sussex Downs College after merger.

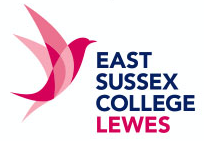
East Sussex College, Lewes - Logo

=== Former Eastbourne College of Arts and Technology ===
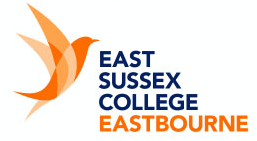
East Sussex College, Eastbourne - Logo

Eastbourne College of Arts and Technology was renamed in 1987. Formerly it was known as the College of Further Education, Eastbourne which had until 1957 been the Eastbourne Technical College and before that the Technical Institute. In 1980 it merged with The College of Art and Design, Eastbourne which was in turn formerly known as the Eastbourne School of Arts and Crafts and in 1962 it acquired 'Eversley Court', St Anne's Road (formerly used by Ascham House Gentlemen's School until 1919. Then by Eastbourne Grammar School and its forerunner which in 1962 moved to King's Drive) both sites in St Anne's road have now been redeveloped for housing.

== Networks ==
The College is a founding member of the Collab Group of further education institutions.

The College was a founder member of The National Academy for Creative & Cultural Skills.

Member of English UK national association of accredited language centres.

== Notable alumni ==
- Sarah Gordy – Actor, work includes Upstairs Downstairs
- Stuart Pearson Wright – Artist
- Lloyd Russell-Moyle – MP for Brighton Kemptown (2017-2024)
- Sushant Subedi - Global Economist
- Wilbur Soot – Singer, YouTuber
- Charlie Suff – Actor, work includes EastEnders
- Tayris Mongardi - Drag Performer, work includes RuPaul's Drag Race UK
