= Kinderdorf Pestalozzi =

Swiss non-profit organization

Coordinates: 47°24′14″N 09°27′36″E

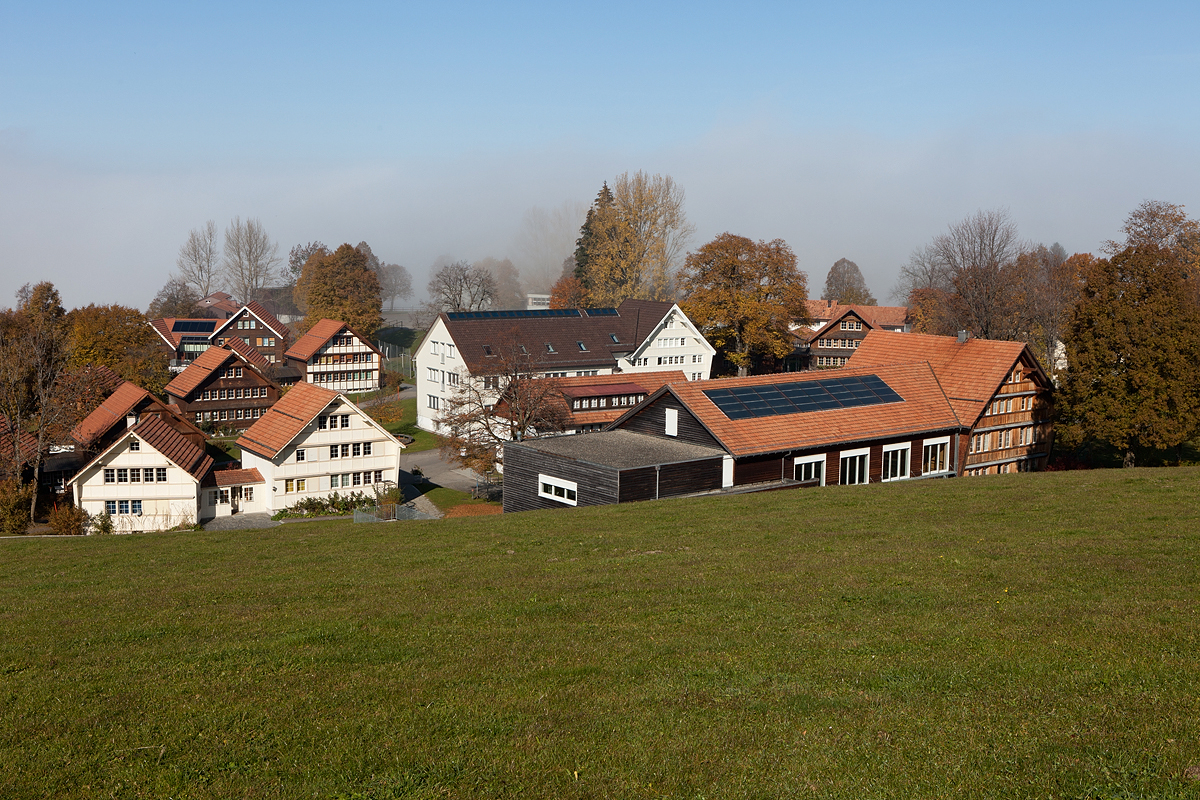
- Named after: Johann Heinrich Pestalozzi
- Formation: 1945
- Type: Non-profit organization to provide the Kinderdorf village for war-affected children
- Legal status: active
- Headquarters: Trogen, Canton of Appenzell Ausserrhoden, Switzerland
- Location: Kinderdorfstrasse 20, CH-9043 Trogen
- Region served: Worldwide
- Website: www.pestalozzi.ch

Kinderdorf Pestalozzi (lit. 'Pestalozzi Children’s Village') is a non-profit organization located in Trogen, Canton Appenzell. It was named after the Swiss education pioneer Johann Heinrich Pestalozzi. Established in 1945, the Stiftung Kinderdorf Pestalozzi provides the Kinderdorf village for war-affected children from all over the world.

== History and objectives ==
In August 1944 Walter Robert Corti launched in the monthly magazine "Du" a call for the foundation of a village for orphans of World War II. His initial plan was to build a refuge for about 8,000 children. In 1945, the association Vereinigung Kinderdorf Pestalozzi, and after Trogen decided to donate the association 4.5 hectares of land on 3 March 1946, the foundation stone was laid on 28 April 1946. The village counted with considerable support from the pedagogues Elisabeth Rotten and Marie Meierhofer.

The aim was to provide the children with education and a friendly atmosphere to give them the possibility to become co-operative, understanding world citizens and that after their graduation they would return to their home-country. The locals were very positive about the project and agreed to the building of a road which connected the Children's Village with Trogen. As the symbol of the village the Ladybird was chosen, and handkerchiefs displaying the ladybird were produced. With the assistance of voluntary helpers from all over Europe, 15 houses were built that served war orphans from the surrounding countries as a refuge. In the same year children from war-torn countries settled the first houses. The children from the different nations lived each in an own house and were taught in their native language. The houses were given names in the language of each nation, and were often chosen from fairy tales or songs. A strong emphasis was put into a cultural exchange with their countries of origin to enable a smooth return after the completion of their education. In the mornings the lessons were taught in their native language, in the afternoon the lessons were in German. The first children came from the nations France, Finland, Greece, Poland, Austria and Germany. In 1950, 30 children from Great Britain arrived, which were assigned two houses. From 1960, in addition to European children, war orphans from Tibet lived at the orphanage, later mostly children from Korea, Tunisia, Ethiopia, Vietnam, Cambodia and Lebanon, since 1983 also orphans from Switzerland. In 1967 a house for prayer open to all religions was built with funds from the British royal family. The length of stay varies from a few weeks (educational or recreational reasons) up to several years. Since 1982 the foundation is also active in countries of the Southern Hemisphere, and since 1990 supervised children's homes in Romania.

The villages own school closed in 1993 and since, the children attend schools in the surrounding municipalities. The aims of the village were reformed and its focus laid on education and intercultural communication. The fundraising is carried out mainly through fundraisers, sponsorships and legacies: In the 2000s the Foundation has invested CHF 18 million annually into the fields of integration, intercultural exchange and development co-operation. As of 2012, the projects of the foundation benefited 321,000 children and adolescents in Switzerland and abroad.

=== Arthur Bill ===
Arthur Bill began to teach at the village in 1947, assuming as its director in 1949. In 1961 he took a year off and was involved in the Swiss delegation to the Neutral Nations Supervisory Commission in Korea. Following he returned to the Pestalozzi village, where he was its director until 1972. Arthur Bill and his wife hired teachers from each nation to teach children in their native language and also act as a parent over the children.

== Facilities ==
In 2005 the Trogen village consisted of twelve semi-detached houses for some 120 children and families as well as economy and administrative buildings. As of 2015, throughout the year around 1,500 children and young people from Switzerland and abroad hold reunions for a short time, inter alia with Swiss school classes. Worldwide, the foundation claims to support more than 400,000 children, young people and their teachers, parents and (educational) authorities in approximately 40 projects. The facilities also include a museum.

== Kinderdorf in popular culture ==
- The Village (1953 film)
- The Silver Sword (US: Escape from Warsaw) by Ian Serraillier ends with an unnamed 'international children's village' in Appenzell. In an Afterword to the 2003 edition Jane Serraillier Grossfeld, the author's daughter, identifies a Picture Post article about the Pestalozzi village as a source for the book.

== Literature ==
- Arthur Bill: Helfer unterwegs. Geschichten eines Landschulmeisters, Kinderdorfleiters und Katastrophenhelfers. Stämpfli, Bern 2002, ISBN 3-7272-1323-X
- Walter Robert Corti, Guido Schmidlin (Hrsg.). Ein Dorf für die leidenden Kinder. Das Kinderdorf Pestalozzi in den Jahren 1949 bis 1972 mit Arthur Bill als Dorfleiter. Verlag Haupt, Bern 2002, ISBN 3-258-06470-9
- Argyris Sfountouris: Das Kinderdorf Pestalozzi in Trogen und sein griechischer Dichter. Bilder aus der Zeit der ersten 25 Jahre. 16 Gedichte von Nikiforos Vrettakos. Verlag Haupt, Bern 1996, ASIN B004HYWO2C.
- Walter Robert Corti: Der Weg zum Kinderdorf Pestalozzi. Haupt Verlag, Bern 1955/2002, ISBN 978-3-258-06468-0.
