= Du (magazine) =

Swiss art and cultural magazine established in 1941

Du Schweizer Monatsschrift
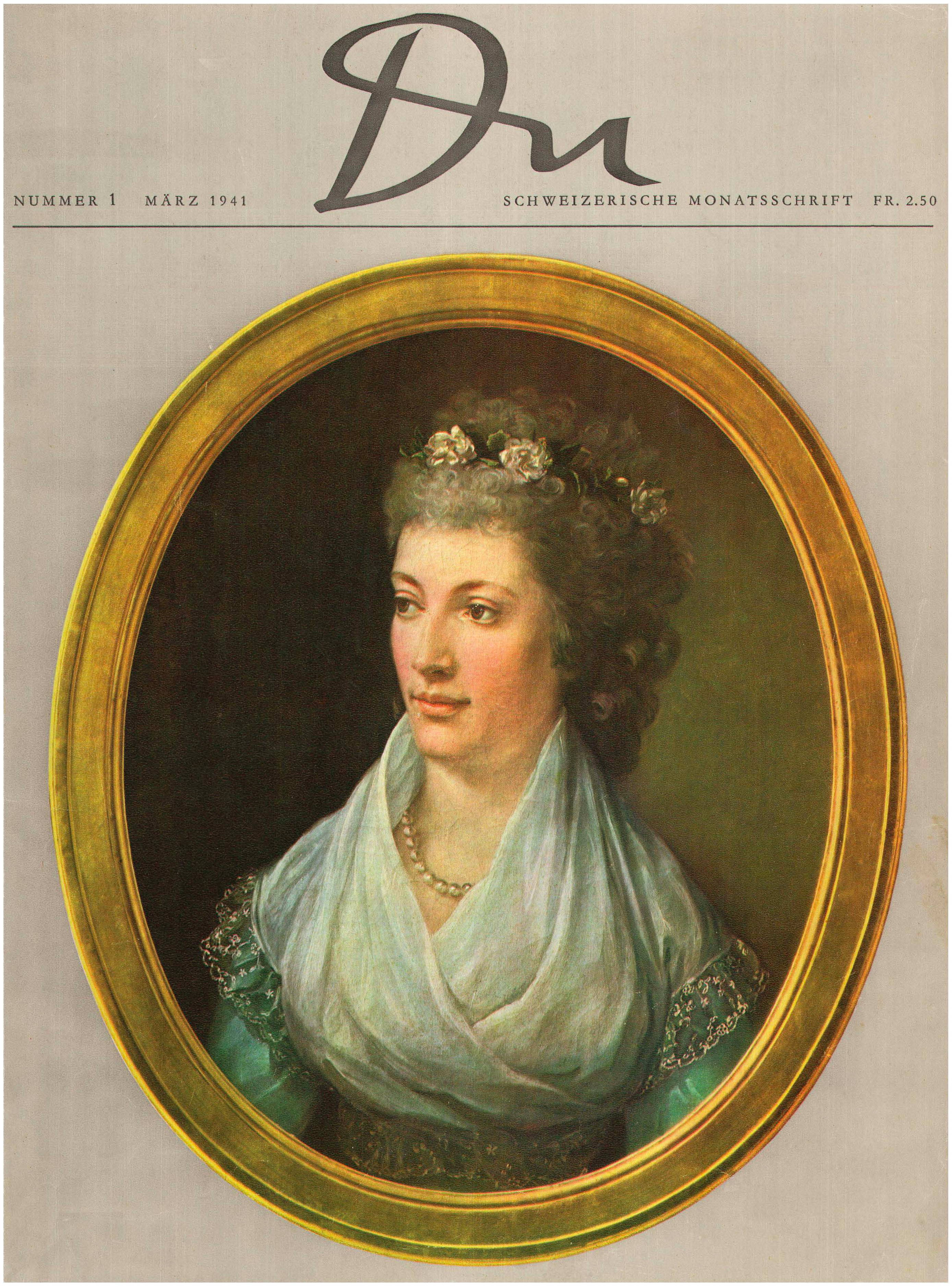
- Cover of the first issue in 1941 with a painting of Maria Magdalena Schulthess
- Editor in Chief: Arnold Kübler (1941–1957); Manuel Gasser (1957–1974); Dieter Bachmann (1988–1998)
- Photographer: René Burri; Werner Bischof
- Frequency: Monthly
- Publisher: Oliver Prange
- Founder: Conzett & Huber
- Founded: 1941
- First issue: March 1941
- Country: Switzerland
- Based in: Zürich
- Language: German language
- Website: www.du-magazin.com

Du is a magazine focused on art and culture, headquartered in Zürich, Switzerland. It was founded in 1941 and was often viewed as one of the leading voices on art and culture in Europe. The magazine is known for its focus on photography; prominent photographers such as Henri Cartier-Bresson, Werner Bischof and Réne Burri were contributors for the magazine.

== History ==
In 1941 the publishing house Conzett & Huber decided to sell the Zürcher Illustrierte and to publish a new magazine in order to promote a color print it developed which enabled the printing of multi-colored photographs in good quality. It was headquartered in Zürich, and the publishing house gave Arnold Kübler, the former editor-in-chief of the Zürcher Illustrierte, the lead over the new magazine. The content of the magazine was less important to the publishers; the first issue included several pages with colorful publicity, some of the fashion-related pages were also in color but not always based on photographic originals. In November 1941 the cover of the magazine was designed according to the main theme of the issue for the first time. and under its first Editor-in-Chief Arnold Kübler focused on colorful photo-stories. Initially the magazine had to face some criticism; some saw it as a waste of public money, others deemed the authors as failed artists who now claimed to judge but within a short period of time, Du was a respected magazine.

=== Title ===
In his first editorial, Kübler wrote about the topic German: Du ("You"), and how the name of the magazine was chosen. Other titles discussed were Windstärke 13, Elan, Niveau and Terra, but Kübler insisted on Du in the discussions within the editorial board. The first issue included a page with several poems titled Du. Between 1941 and 1958, Du was published with the subtitle Schweizer Monatsschrift (Swiss Monthly), then under Manuel Gasser as editor-in-chief the magazine used the subtitle Kulturelle Monatsschrift (Cultural Monthly), and Dominik Keller introduced the Europäische Monatsschrift (European Monthly) in 1975.

== Notable editors-in-chief ==
=== Arnold Kübler ===
Kübler was the editor in chief from 1941 to 1957 during which 204 issues of the Du were published. Under his lead, the magazine's focus was not on the traditional news but more on the people and their environment. The magazine was meant to bring some hope and distraction to the people worried due to World War II. In November 1941 he was responsible for the mono-thematic issue of the magazine on "death". Under Küblers lead, the Swiss philosopher Walter Corti was an editor from 1942 until 1957. He wrote an influential article in the Du, in which he advocated for the establishment of a village for orphans of World War II. As a result, the Pestalozzi Children's Village was founded in 1946. In 1946, Du published an issue on the reconstruction in Europe. By the 1950s it reached an international readership of over 30'000.

=== Manuel Gasser ===
In 1957, the former editor-in-chief of the Weltwoche, Manuel Gasser, succeeded Kübler, the magazines focus turned more to art. In 1958, a photo-reportage on Switzerland by Henri Cartier-Bresson was published, in 1959 another one by René Burri on the Argentinian Gaucho's. He also enabled covers designed by the painters Marc Chagall or Joan Miró. Between 1958 and 1964 the Swiss writer Hugo Loetscher would be the literary editor of the magazine. In 1960 Loetscher also founded the supplement Das Wort (English:The Word) which had a focus on philosophy and social sciences. 1964 the Du joined forces with the magazine Atlantis. After 204 issues Gasser left the Du in 1974. With his successors Dominik Keller and Wolfhart Draeger the magazine was not able to capture the readers as before and the circulation diminished.

=== Dieter Bachmann ===
In 1988, Conzett & Huber was bought by Tamedia from Zürich; and Dieter Bachmann became Du's editor-in-chief. Bachmann attempted to lead the magazine to former glories with editions on Gabriel Garcia Marquez or the Swiss authors Friedrich Dürrenmatt and Max Frisch and the circulation returned to over 25'000. After Bachmann left Du in 1998, the quality diminished and the readership fell to 12'000. The magazine wasn't profitable and after Du's ownership changed several times; it was bought by Oliver Prange in 2007.

=== Oliver Prange ===
Under Prange, who was editor in chief since 2015, the magazine published issues in cooperation with other cultural institutions for which it also received financial support. This went well until, a week ahead of the Federal Elections in 2015, Du published an issue about the art collection of the politician of the Swiss People's Party (SVP) Christoph Blocher. Some have criticized the fact that a cultural institution like Du was used as a vehicle for electoral publicity.

== Reception ==
The magazine became a cultural magazine during World War II, and seemed to have followed the line of the Federal Council of Switzerland and also the former Zürcher Illustrierte which both supported an Spiritual National Defense in 1938. A lot of the content in the first issues focused on Swiss artists, painters and landscapes. The cover of the December issue was regularly themed after Christmas. Corti wrote an influential article in which he advocated for the establishment of a village for orphans of World War II. As a result, the Pestalozzi Children's Village was founded in 1946.

=== Photography ===
The magazine is credited with having employed prominent photographers and focused on quality images and colorful photo-stories. Several thousand colored and black and white photographs of the Du were included in the German Marburg Picture Index in 1976 when the Marburger institution bought the photographs from Conzett & Huber for 25'000 DM.

== Award ==
2011 Henri Nannen prize for a photo story on Tomi Ungerer.
