= Arnold Kübler =

Swiss writer, illustrator, and journalist (1890–1983)

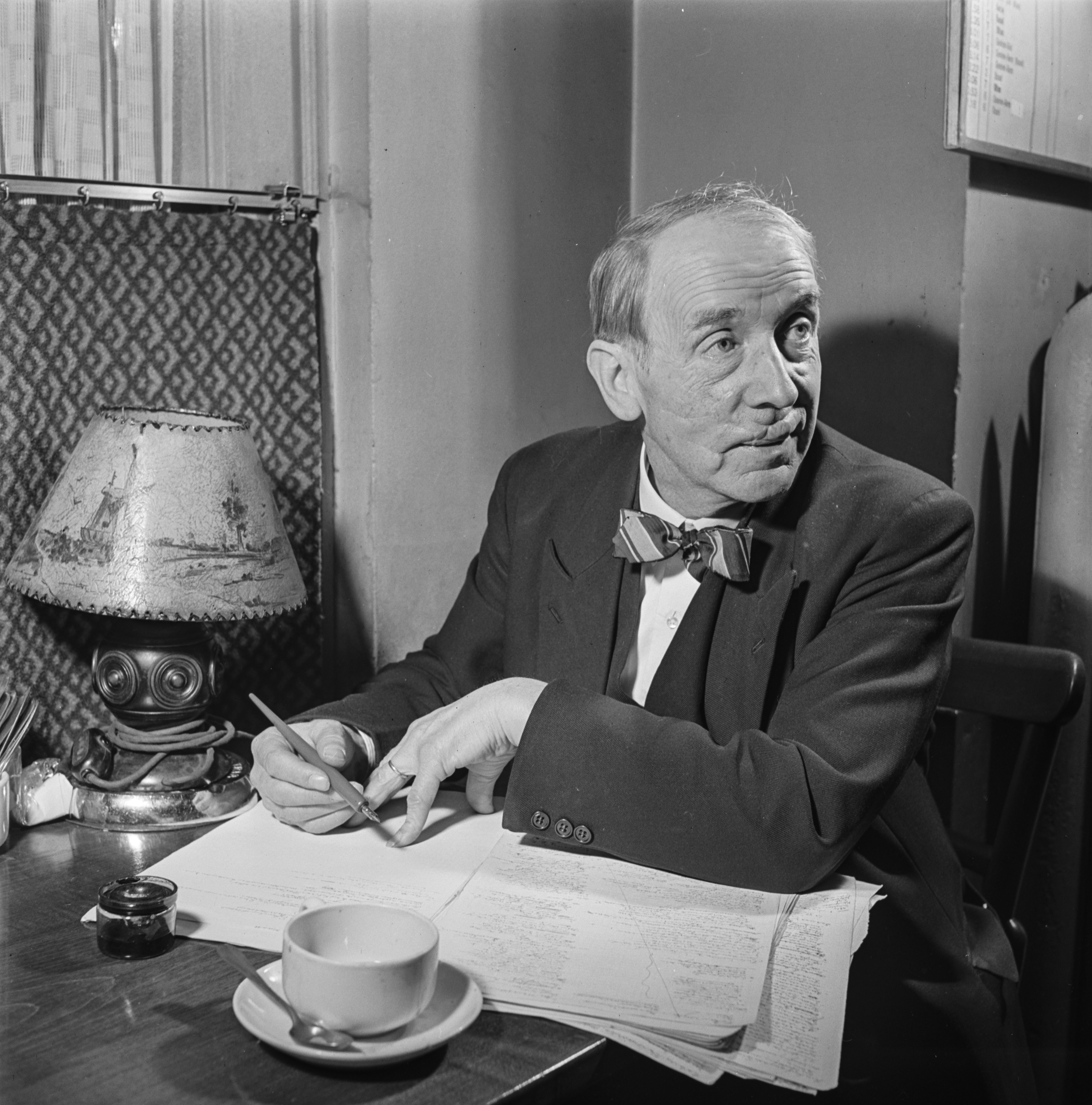

Editor-in-Chief of the Zürcher Illustrierte
- In office 1929–1941

Editor-in-Chief of Du
- In office 1941–1958

Personal details
- Born: Arnold Kübler; 2 August 1890 Wiesendangen, Zürich
- Died: 27 December 1983 (aged 93) Zürich

Arnold Kübler (2 August 1890 – 27 December 1983) was a Swiss journalist and writer. He was the editor-in-chief of the Zürcher Illustrierte and of the cultural magazine Du. In his later career, he also acted as a one-man cabaret.

== Education and early life ==
Kübler was born on the 2 August 1890 in Wiesendangen, Canton Zurich to a farmer. He attended high school in Winterthur and from 1911 onwards studied geology at the University of Zurich and University of Delft. He gave up his studied in 1917 and unsuccessfully attempted to become a sculptor. Then he began to draw, eventually turning to writing and becoming an actor at the Theater in Zürich. In an attempt to enhance his German, he went to Germany and after World War I was engaged as an actor in Görlitz, Dresden and Berlin. This acting career came to a sudden end when a surgery left disfiguring scars on his face. However, the years of apprenticeship and travel were followed by clear continuity in creativity and recognition of work. In 1922, Kübler had his first literary success with the play Schuster Aiolos, which premiered in Potsdam.

== Professional career ==
After his return to Switzerland in 1926, he was appointed editor-in-chief of the Zürcher Illustrierte in 1929, which under his lead developed into a respected literary and photographic magazine. He was convinced that a photograph can also be a vehicle of a message and worked with prominent photographers Paul Senn or Gotthard Schuh. In the literary section works by Hermann Hesse or Max Frisch were included. In 1941, Conzett & Huber decided to sell the «Zürcher Illustrierte» and publish a new magazine with which they planned to promote the multi-color print they have developed. Arnold Kübler became the editor-inchief of the newly founded cultural magazine "Du", which he ran for 16 years. Under Küblers leadership the Du became a well respected cultural magazine, employed prominent photographers like before also the Zürcher Illustrierte and focused on painters like Pablo Picasso, Joan Miro or Paul Klee. In the 1960s he returned to the theater stage with great success as a one-man cabaret.

== Literary career ==
In 1934 his first novel "Failed Actor", a piece about a Swiss actor who attempts to speak a pure German language was published. He is also well known for the autobiographically inspired Öppi novels. In addition, Kübler was active in drawing and writing. He combined these two forms especially in his late works, such as in the workshop book Draw, Antonio! of 1966 or in Paris-Bâle à pied in 1967. Paris-Bâle à pied is an account about his wandering on foot from Basel to Paris in twenty-eight days.

== Awards and recognition ==
1954 Carl Heinrich Ernst Art Prize

1963 Literary prize of the City of Zürich

1981 Honorary citizen of Wiesendangen

1991 Du issue on Arnold Kübler for the 50 years anniversary of the Du

== Personal life ==
Arnold Kübler married Alva Carolina Fredrika Gierzt in 1927 and was the father of a daughter. He died on 27 December 1983 in Zurich.
