= Werner Bischof =

Swiss photojournalist (1916–1954)

Werner Bischof (26 April 1916 – 16 May 1954) was a Swiss photographer and photojournalist. He became a full member of Magnum Photos in 1949, the first new photographer to join its original founders. Bischof's book Japan (1954) was awarded the Prix Nadar in 1955.

== Life and work ==
Bischof was born on 26 April 1916, in Zürich. At age six, the family moved to Waldshut, Germany, where he subsequently went to school. In 1932, having abandoned studies to become a teacher, he enrolled at the Kunstgewerbeschule in Zürich. While there he studied alongside Hans Finsler. He graduated cum laude in 1936.

From 1939, he worked as an independent photographer for various magazines, in particular, du, based in Zürich. He travelled extensively from 1945 to 1949 through nearly all European countries, from France to Romania and from Norway to Greece. His works on the devastation in post-war Europe established him as one of the foremost photojournalists of his time. He was pioneer of color photography since 1939 in some rare technology and used it to document in a large number of color photographies the terrifying ruins of former so-called executioner and victim countries, Germany and Poland (1946-1948) because their border it was the place where the last war broke out, in pionieering and rare technology of color photography described by photographers as the same process as Technicolor but in photography, not in cinematography using his American Devin Tricolor (1934) camera with tripod. Most of the color photographies from Germany and Poland have not yet been published, but have been preserved in the archive in Zürich. Technology used by him was far better and accurate than Agfacolor used during the war in Europe.

He was associated into Magnum Photos in 1948 and became a full member in 1949. At that time Magnum was composed of just five other photographers, its founders Robert Capa, Henri Cartier-Bresson, George Rodger, David Seymour, and Ernst Haas.

The focus of much of Bischof's post-war humanist photography was showing the poverty and despair around him in Europe, tempered with his desire to travel the world, conveying the beauty of nature and humanity.

Of photography, Bischof said -

I felt compelled to venture forth and explore the true face of the world. Leading a satisfying life of plenty had blinded many of us to the immense hardships beyond our borders.

— Werner Bischof

In 1951, he went to India, freelancing for Life, and then to Japan and Korea. For Paris Match he worked as a war reporter in Vietnam. In 1954, he travelled through Mexico and Panama, before flying to Peru, where he embarked on a trip through the Andes to the Amazonas on 14 May. On 16 May 1954, his car fell off a cliff on a mountain road in the Andes, and all three passengers were killed.

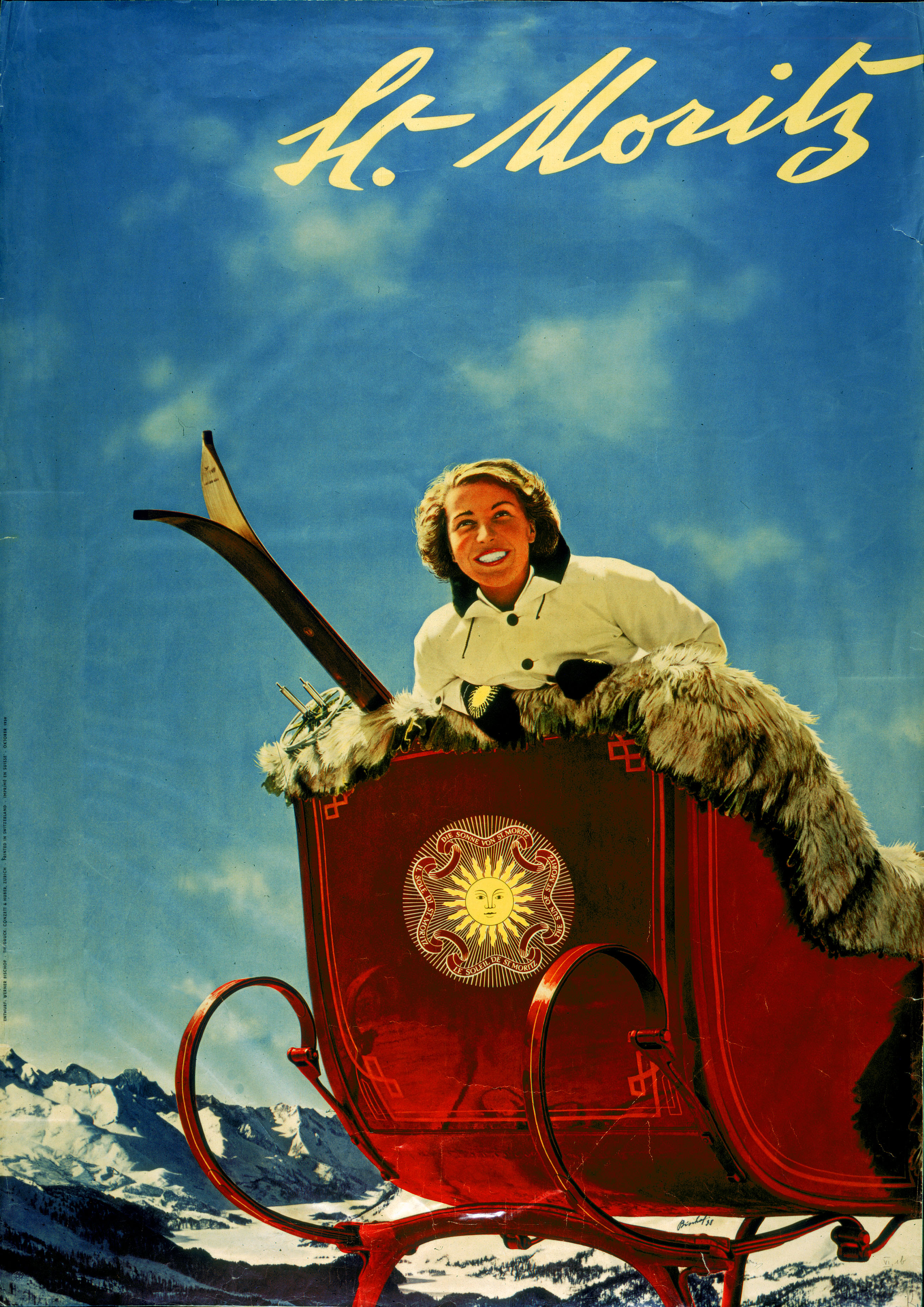
Advertisement by Bischof (1938)

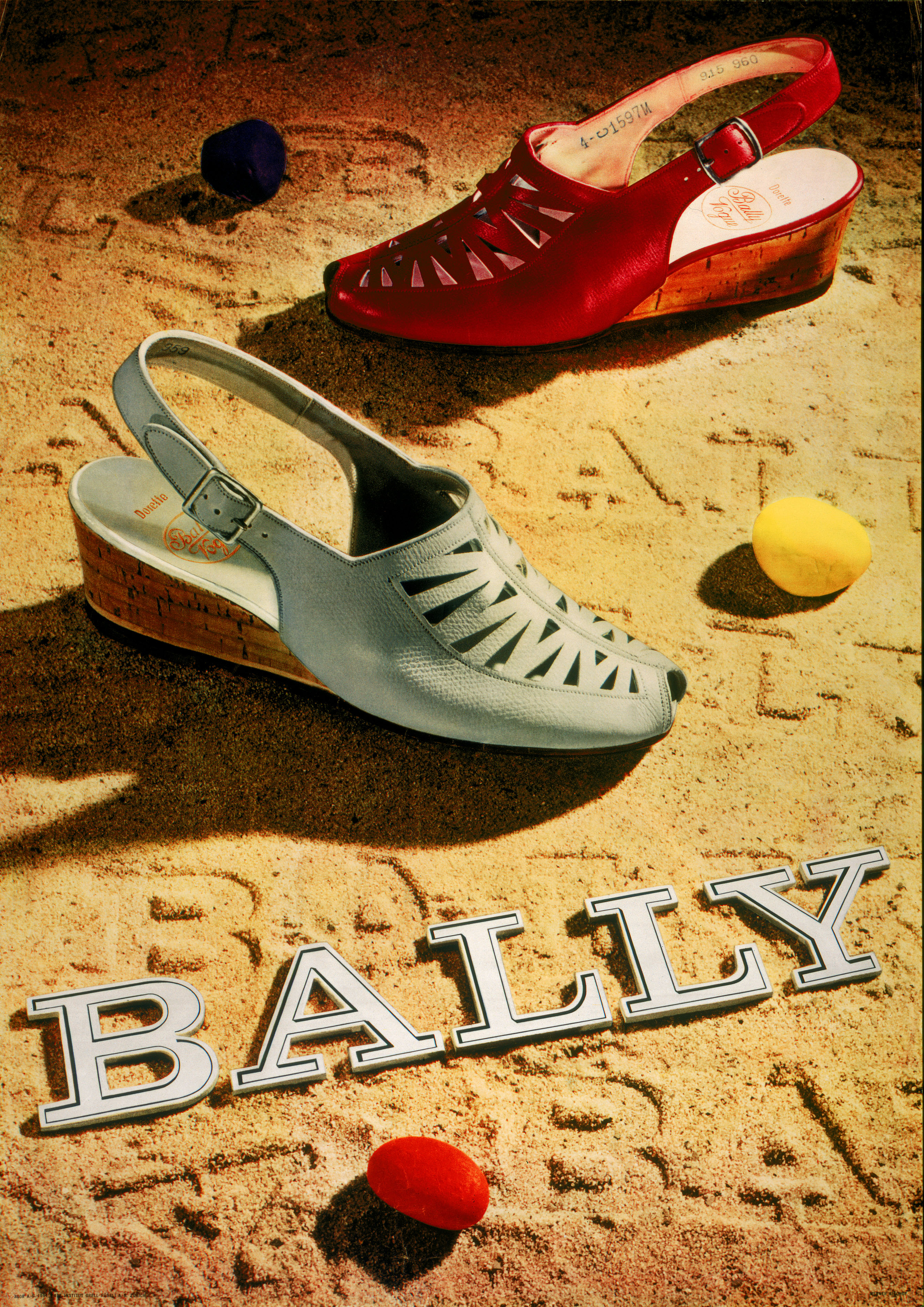
Advertisement by Bischof (1944)

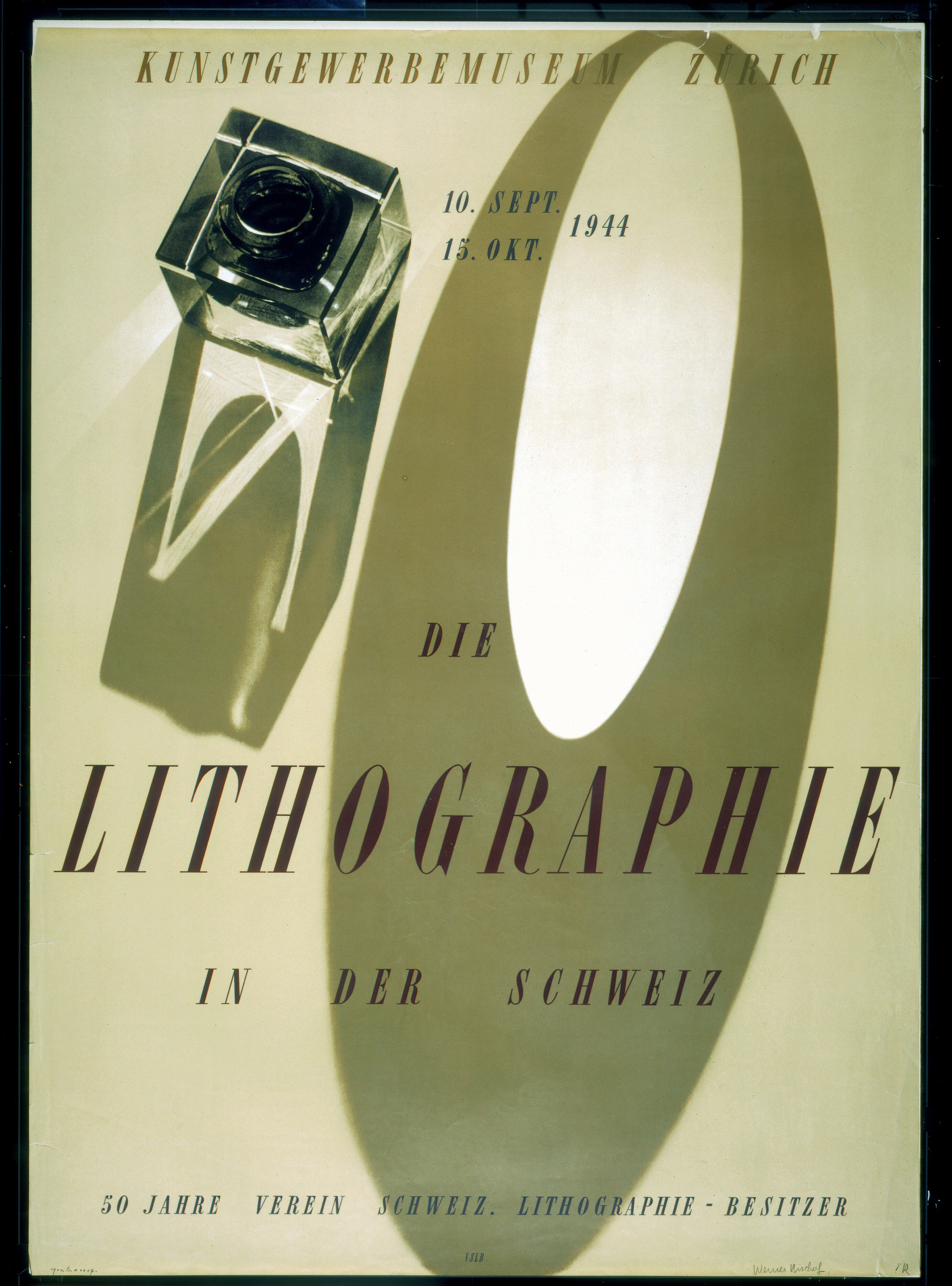
Poster Die Lithographie in der Schweiz (Bischof, 1944)

== Publications ==
=== Publications by Bischof ===
- Japan. Zurich: Manesse, 1954. (in German)
  - Japan. London: Sylvan, 1954. New York: Simon & Schuster, 1954.
  - Japon. Paris: Delpire, 1954. (in French)
- Indiens Pas Mort,(with Pierre Verger and Robert Frank), Zurich: Conzett & Huber, 1956.
- Carnet de Route.Zurich: Conzett & Huber, 1957.
- Werner Bischof: Europa 1945 – 1950. Zürich: Tages-Anzeiger, 1990. OCLC 845274917
- After the War. Washington, D.C.: Smithsonian, 1997. ISBN 1-56098-721-9. Foreword by Miriam Mafai.
- Werner Bischof. Phaidon 55's. London: Phaidon, 2001. ISBN 0-7148-4041-6. Text by Claude Cookman.
- Questions to My Father: A Tribute to Werner Bischof. London: Trolley, 2004. ISBN 1-904563-25-2. Edited by Marco Bischof.

=== Publications about Bischof ===
- Werner Bischof, 1916–1954 His Life and Work. London: Thames and Hudson, 1990. ISBN 9780500092156. By Marco Bischof and Rene Burri. With an introduction by Hugo Loetscher and text by Marco Bishof and Guido Magnaguagno.

== Awards ==
- 1955: His book Japon (Japan) won the Prix Nadar
