= Illustrated (disambiguation) =

An illustration is a decoration, interpretation, or visual explanation of a text, concept, or process.

Illustrated may also refer to:

- Classics Illustrated
- Cook's Illustrated
- Fiction Illustrated
- Frost Illustrated
- Hero Illustrated
- Horns Illustrated
- Illustrated Life Rhodesia
- Lloyd's Illustrated London Newspaper
- Marvel Illustrated
- Mechanix Illustrated
- Military Illustrated
- Pro Wrestling Illustrated
- Railroads Illustrated
- Science Illustrated
- Sports Illustrated
- Sports Illustrated Kids
- The Illustrated American
- The War Illustrated

Illustrated Magazine or The Illustrated Magazine may refer to:

- Hutchings' Illustrated California Magazine, San Francisco
- The English Illustrated Magazine, London

Illustrated News or The Illustrated News may refer to:

- Canadian Illustrated News, Montreal
- The Illustrated Australian News
- The Illustrated London News
- The Illustrated Police News, London
- Illustrated Police News (Boston)
- Illustrated Sporting and Dramatic News, London
- Illustrated Sydney News
- The Illustrated War News, London

Illustrated Daily News may refer to:

- Illustrated Daily News (Los Angeles), or Los Angeles Daily News (1923-1954) in Los Angeles, later merged to Los Angeles Mirror
- Illustrated Daily News (New York), in New York, earlier title of the New York Daily News

Illustrated Weekly or The Illustrated Weekly may refer to:

- Redpath's Illustrated Weekly
- The Illustrated Times Weekly Newspaper
- The Illustrated Weekly Hudd
- The Illustrated Weekly of India
- Weekly Illustrated

Illustrated Monthly or The Illustrated Monthly may refer to:

- Hutchings' Illustrated California Magazine, San Francisco
- The English Illustrated Magazine, London

Other languages

- Berliner Illustrirte Zeitung, Germany
- Illustreret Folkeblad, Norway
- Illustreret Nyhedsblad, Norway
- Illustreret Tidende, Denmark
- L'Illustré, France
- Le Monde illustré, France
- Le Petit Français illustré, France

== See also ==
- CNN Sports Illustrated, or CNN/SI, was a 24-hour sports news network. It was created by Time Warner, bringing together its CNN and Sports Illustrated brands and related resources. It was launched on December 12, 1996
- The Illustrated Man (film), a 1969 American dark science fiction drama film directed by Jack Smight
- News Illustrated, a full-page information graphic that runs every Sunday in the South Florida Sun-Sentinel
- Penny Illustrated Paper, a cheap (1d.) illustrated weekly newspaper that ran from 1861 to 1913

Disambiguation pages

- Illustrated Magazine (disambiguation)
- Illustrated News (disambiguation)
- Illustrated Weekly (disambiguation)
