= Illustrated News =

Illustrated News or The Illustrated News may refer to:

- Canadian Illustrated News, Montreal
- The Illustrated Australian News
- Illustrated Daily News, Los Angeles
- The Illustrated London News
- The Illustrated Police News, London
- Illustrated Police News (Boston)
- Illustrated Sporting and Dramatic News, London
- Illustrated Sydney News
- The Illustrated War News, London

== See also ==
Disambiguation pages

- Illustrated (disambiguation)
- Illustrated Magazine
- Illustrated Weekly
