= Illustrated Weekly =

Illustrated Weekly or The Illustrated Weekly may refer to:

- Redpath's Illustrated Weekly
- The Illustrated Times Weekly Newspaper
- The Illustrated Weekly Hudd
- The Illustrated Weekly of India
- Weekly Illustrated

== See also ==
- Illustrated (disambiguation)
- Illustrated Magazine
- Illustrated News
