= Marie-Rose Zingg =

Swiss pioneer of early childhood care and founder of the Valais Nursery

- Born: June 28, 1897; Basel, Switzerland
- Died: February 15, 1975 (aged 77); Sion, Valais, Switzerland
- Occupation: Secretary Director of the Valais Nursery
- Known for: Founder and long-term director of the Pouponnière valaisanne (Valais Nursery)

Marie-Rose Zingg, born in Basel on June 28, 1897, was a prominent figure in Valais, known for having founded and run the Valais nursery from 1931 until February 15, 1975., the date of her death in Sion.

== Biography ==
Marie-Rose Zingg lost her mother at the age of 3 and spent her childhood away from her father, who worked in the hotel industry in France. In 1914, she was sent to Montana in Switzerland to be treated for early-stage tuberculosis. She received vocational training in Valais after attending classes at the École supérieure de commerce des jeunes filles (Higher School of Commerce for Girls) in the city of Sion. She began her career as a typist at the Valais Chamber of Commerce, a position she held for 18 years. At the same time, alongside her job, she founded the Société pour l'Enfance valaisanne (Valais Children's Society) with the aim of creating a nursery and organising charitable events for children. The Valais Nursery officially opened its doors on 15 October 1931.,Zingg ran this institution for over 40 years. She gradually stepped down from her duties from 1971 onwards, while remaining vice-president of the Society for Valais Childhood. Her health deteriorated, and she died at the hospital in Sion. The association Radiokamerad announced her death with the words "Ich hatt' einen Kameraden" (I had a comrade).

She is considered the pioneer of early childhood policy in Valais.

== Valais Nursery ==
Under the name "Pouponnière valaisanne", there are four childcare facilities for mothers and their children.

=== The nursery (1931–present) ===
Marie-Rose Zingg was moved by the number of abandoned or neglected children she encountered every day and wanted to help them. She created the Valais Nursery, a place designed to take in orphaned, illegitimate, or needy children. Less than a year after opening, around 50 children had been taken in; among them were "three motherless orphans, six children whose parents had divorced, three children requiring special care, one child of unfit parents, 14 children of unemployed parents or parents who both worked, nine whose mothers were ill, eleven illegitimate children, and three at risk of tuberculosis". The nursery takes in abandoned or orphaned children for whom it seeks adoptive families. Ms. Zingg placed many children with families who adopted them until the early 1970s; she herself adopted two children.

When the Pagane chalet, built by the Valais Children's Society, had to be vacated, the nursery had difficulty finding new premises and moved several times (to the Gessler villa in 1935, to the Germanier clinic in 1936, to the Wildhorn in Arbaz in 1939,). In 1946, after the Jesuit community left Valais, the nursery moved into the former hospital in Sion, where it remained until 2008. However, the building had suffered damage in the earthquake of January 1945 and required repairs, which were carried out by the committee of the Société pour l'Enfance valaisanne (Valais Children's Society) with the help of Marie-Rose Zingg. The city of Sion authorities covered the heating, water, and electricity costs, amounting to 12,000 francs per year.

The nursery struggles with recurring poverty and difficulty finding accommodation. Since the state provides no support, it relies entirely on private donations for survival. The director constantly seeks financial or in-kind assistance to continue her mission. A 1944 article in the newspaper Die Nation by Peter Surava, with photos by Paul Senn, described Marie-Rose Zingg's work with needy children, which saved the nursery from bankruptcy and generated nationwide donations. However, some politicians still persecuted Zingg, accusing her of damaging Valais's image. In 1945, Corinna Bille also published an article calling for donations to help the institution continue its charitable work.

In the early 1950s, the Valais Nursery took care of children from birth until they started school: orphans, illegitimate children, children of separated parents, or children of working parents. It became the first daycare center in the city of Sion, responding to new social needs as more and more mothers entered the workforce. It opened its doors to children from all parts of the canton, from all over Switzerland and even from abroad. In the 1970s, parents wanted their children to be cared for from a very young age, so the nursery opened a crèche offering services from 7:30 a.m. to 6:30 p.m. every day, even on Sundays. The nursery's current mission is similar to that of all nurseries in Valais; it is subject to the Youth Act implemented in 2000; it welcomes 128 children per day from 6:30 a.m. to 6:30 p.m. and belongs to the Sion Association of Childcare Facilities (ASLAE).

=== The nursing school (1932–2004) ===
In 1932, Mrs. Zingg, who understood the importance of having qualified staff directly attached to the institution, established a nursing school. It was intended to complement the Providence nursing school in Sierre, which had been opened by Sister Claire that same year. However, after a few initial difficulties, the school in Sion enabled many young women to obtain professional training as nurses specializing in childcare, including the care and supervision of children. Theoretical courses in anatomy and physiology were taught by Dr. Adolphe Sierro. Practical courses were taught by lay teachers and nurses and included newborn care, meal preparation, and making baby clothes. Although a health survey showed that Valais was training too many nurses in relation to its needs, the nursery school in Sion, which lacked sufficient financial resources, remained open until 2004, well after the La Providence nursing school in Sierre had closed.

=== Maternity care (1946–1973) ===
In 1946, thanks to the support of Dr. Sierro, the nursery's attending physician, Mrs. Zingg was authorized to open a small maternity ward on the nursery's premises. She could accommodate 10 to 12 women in labor. After a few weeks, there were 26 births. In contrast to hospital practice, women in labor could bring their older children with them, who were cared for at the nursery during the birth and their mother's recovery. The number of births increased steadily, and the 4,000th birth was celebrated at the nursery in April 1966.

=== The Sainte-Elisabeth Organization (1947–1991) ===
The numerous cases of single mothers made Marie-Rose Zingg realize the importance of helping mothers in distress. The Sainte-Élisabeth charity offered refuge to young pregnant women who had been abandoned by their seducers and rejected by their families. They found shelter in the nursery and, in return, helped with the daily tasks there. Marie-Rose Zingg wanted to prevent the despair that can lead to abortion. However, with the democratization of contraceptive methods, the number of single mothers decreased, but the Sainte-Élisabeth refuge continued to receive expectant mothers who were placed there by the association "Oui à la vie" (Yes to Life).

== Tribute ==
A film entitled "Ils vivront heureux" (They Will Live Happily) was shot at the nursery by Hervé Surènes, in collaboration with Rémy Moret and André Surval. It shows the dedication of the nurses and that of the founder, Mrs. Zingg.

A photo exhibition tracing the 80-year history of the Valais nursery and paying tribute to Mrs. Zingg, its first director, was inaugurated in April 2009 in Sion.

In 2021, Marie-Rose Zingg's portrait was selected to be among the eight portraits of Valais women published on the Hommages 2021 website to mark the 50th anniversary of women's suffrage in Switzerland.

== Bibliography ==
- Marie-France Vouilloz Burnier, "Rosemarie Zingg, fondatrice de la pouponnière valaisanne", in Valaisannes d'hier et d'aujourd'hui. La longue marche vers l'égalité, Marie-France Vouilloz Burnier and Barbara Guntern Anthamatten (eds.), Sierre, Monographic, 2003.
- Marie-France Vouilloz Burnier and V. Barras, "Naissance et déclin des Écoles de nurses", in De l'hospice au Réseau santé. Santé publique et systèmes hospitaliers valaisans XIX-XX s, Sierre, Monographic, 2004, pp. 123–125.
- Marie-France Vouilloz Burnier, Marie-Rose Zingg et la Pouponnière valaisanne. Une pionnière de l'accueil de la petite enfance. Sion, Archives de l'État du Valais, Cahier de Vallesia 34, 2021.
