= Malofiej Awards =

Spanish awards for accomplishments in infographics

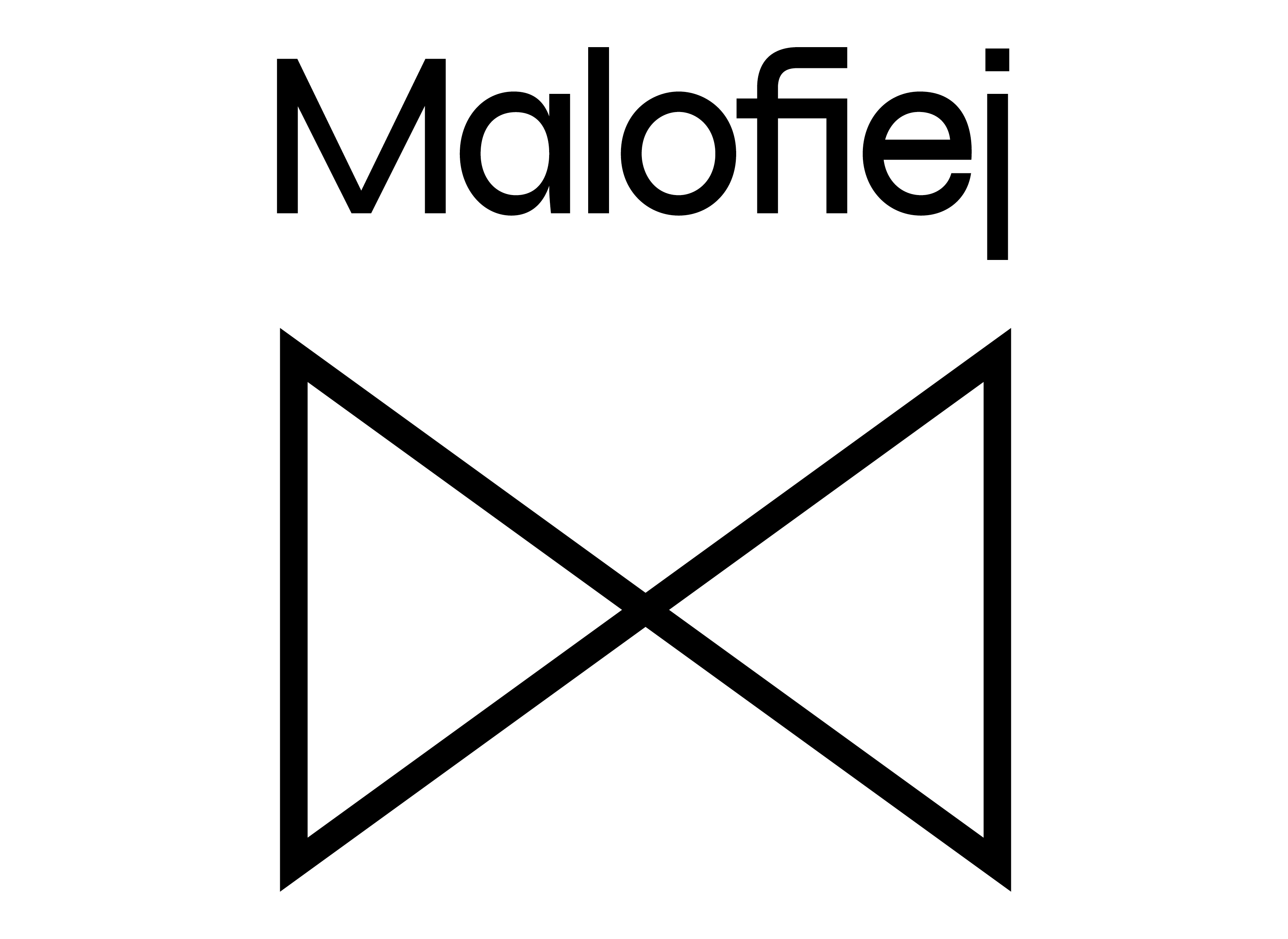

The annual Malofiej Awards for Infographics were organized by the Spanish chapter of the Society for News Design (SND-E) for accomplishments in journalistic infographics. They have been regarded as some of the most prestigious in this field. The awards were given each March in Pamplona, Spain.

Submissions were invited online.

On October 1, 2021, the organizers announced that the awards would be paused “while we open a period of reflection to think about how to continue with them in the future.”

== History ==
The awards are named for Argentine designer Alejandro Malofiej, who made simple and creative graphics.

The Malofiej were an essential reference for their prestige and drawing power. The Awards, considered to be the Pulitzers for infographics, the professional workshop “Show, Don’t Tell!” and the Conference in Pamplona annually bring together the best infographics artists from media (newspapers, magazines, agencies) from around the world.
