= News Illustrated =

Weekly information graphic in the South Florida Sun-Sentinel

News Illustrated is a full-page information graphic that runs every Sunday in the South Florida Sun-Sentinel, one of 12 newspapers owned by Tribune Company. It tells news stories visually — and in ways that are hard to replicate with traditional journalism. Subjects range from explaining advances in science to politics, health, sports and physiology.

== History ==
Cover of Dancing Honeybees And Other Natural Wonders of Science, An Illustrated Compendium

News Illustrated started as a response to reader requests for science coverage. In 1993, Editor Gene Cryer created a weekly color page aimed at engaging young readers and named it Science. Initially, the page published stories from the week that couldn't find their way into the daily paper. Designer/copy editor William McDonald would pick the topic, research it, write it and turn it in to the graphics department. Graphics Editor Lynn Occhiuzzo and her staff then illustrated and designed the page. Once the page progressed, others in the newsroom started taking part, including designer/editor David Baker. The graphics staff also contributed ideas.

The page proved popular and was reprinted in 1994 as a book titled "Dancing Honeybees and Other Natural Wonders of Science: An Illustrated Compendium" ISBN 0-8092-3552-8 The credited author was William Lynn Baker, which combined the names of McDonald, Occhiuzzo and Baker.

By 1996, the art department was remade to focus on information graphics and the graphics staff assumed the reporting, writing and production of the page. For a period of two years (1996 to 1998) former senior graphic reporter R. Scott Horner managed the page, developing ideas, researching and creating the pages. In 1998 other artists in the department began regularly producing Science pages. In 1999, it was renamed News Illustrated to reflect a broadening of subject matter to include politics, world events, sports and culture.

== Readership ==
News Illustrated reaches more than a million readers every week. The page is published in the Sun-Sentinel, in sister Tribune Company newspapers, including the Orlando Sentinel, and is repurposed for weekly distribution by the McClatchy-Tribune graphics wire service, a collaboration between Tribune Company and The McClatchy Company.

== Offshoots ==
News Illustrated has led to two notable sites online. In 1996, graphics director Leavett Biles made the decision to animate News Illustrated content for the Sun-Sentinel's web site. Biles hired Don Wittekind as assistant graphics director and gave him the task of developing a new kind of "multimedia informational graphics." Wittekind and graphics reporter R. Scott Horner launched the paper's first graphic, "Santa's High-Tech Sleigh," in December 1996 and followed with several more serious projects early in 1997. These pioneering efforts led to the creation of a Multimedia Gallery page, which would later be renamed The Edge. In 2008, a News Illustrated blog launched to expand on the printed page with interactivity, information edited out of the page and links to research resources.

== Awards ==
News Illustrated has been recognized many times through the years in international competition, most notably by the Society for News Design. Some recent examples:

- 2005: Three Awards of Excellence: Egg colors , Sleep apnea , Staff portfolio
- 2006: Seven Awards of Excellence: African-American migration , Global warming (2) , High-heeled shoes , Oil drilling , Treating AIDS , Belinda Long-Ivey portfolio
- 2007: Five Awards of Excellence: Super Bowl XLI , Construction cranes , Nutrition , Pirate life , Panama Canal

== Sources ==
- A practical guide to graphics reporting, Jennifer George-Palilonis ISBN 0240807073
- Dancing Honeybees and Other Natural Wonders of Science: An Illustrated Compendium" William Lynn Baker ISBN 0-8092-3552-8
- Professional and Technical Writing Strategies: Communicating in Technology and Science (6th Edition), Judith S. VanAlstyne ISBN 0-13-191520-7

== Official external links ==
- News Illustrated pdf archive
- News Illustrated blog
- TheEdge multimedia gallery
