= Peter Sullivan =

Peter Sullivan may refer to:

- Peter Sullivan (actor) (born 1963), British actor
- Peter Sullivan (designer) (1932–1996), British graphic designer, The Sunday Times
- Peter Sullivan (ice hockey) (born 1951), Canadian hockey player
- Peter Sullivan (politician) (born 1967), from Manchester, New Hampshire
- Peter Sullivan (record producer), record producer of the 1960s
- Peter Sullivan (rugby, born 1948), Australian rugby league player and rugby union international captain
- Peter Sullivan (rugby union, born 1998), Irish rugby union player
- Peter Sullivan (screenwriter) (born 1976), American screenwriter, film director and producer
- Peter Sullivan (wrongful conviction), a British victim of miscarriage of justice
- Peter John Sullivan (1821–1883), American soldier and diplomat
- Peter Sullivan, a character in the 2011 film Margin Call

== See also ==
- Peter O'Sullivan (disambiguation)
