= Peter Sullivan (designer) =

British graphic designer (1932–1996)

Peter Sullivan (1932–1996) was a British graphic designer best known for his work on information graphics in The Sunday Times. He worked for the paper 15 years, starting from the beginning of the 1970s, until his death at the age of 64. His colleagues included Nigel Holmes, Edwin Taylor, Robert Harding and John Grimwade. Sullivan was also Head of Graphic Design at Canterbury College of Art.

In 1987 he wrote the book Newspaper Graphics, which is still one of the few books that deal with information graphics in newspapers. In 1993 he continued on the topic in his book Information Graphics in Colour.

In the annual Malofiej-competition for information graphics, the highest prize is named Peter Sullivan award. The competition is held by the SND/E.

== Selected works ==
- Sullivan, Peter. (1987) Newspaper Graphics. IFRA, Darmstadt.
- Sullivan, Peter. (1993) Information Graphics in Colour. IFRA, Darmstadt.

== Sources ==
- Taylor, Edwin. (1996) In memory of a penman of genius, obituary in The Sunday Times on June 2, 1996.
- Evans, Harold. (1978) Editing and Design 4: Pictures on a Page. William Heinemann, London.
- Holmes, Nigel. An interview by John Grimwade Accessed April 15, 2007.
- SND. Malofiej Accessed April 15, 2007.
