= Walter R. Houghton =

American historian

Walter Raleigh Houghton (3 October 1845 – 24 January 1929) was an American historian of politics, religion, and other subjects.

One of Houghton's books, Conspectus of the History of Political Parties and the Federal Government, includes an early example of an infographic, charting the changes in American political parties, their popularity, and power.

== Some of Houghton's titles ==
As author:

- Conspectus of the History of Political Parties and the Federal Government
- History of American Politics (non-partisan): Embracing a History of the Federal Government and of Political Parties in the Colonies and United States from 1607 to the Present
- Kings of Fortune or the Triumphs and Achievements of Noble, Self-made Men
- Lives of James G. Blaine and John A. Logan and History of the Republican Party

As editor-in-chief:

- Neely's History Of The Parliament Of Religions And Religious Congresses at the World's Columbian Exposition

As lead co-author:

- Rules of Etiquette and Home Culture or What to Do and How to Do It
