= Media room =

Media room may refer to:

- A home cinema, home theater room, television room, or other bonus room
- A newsroom or press room
