= Peter O'Sullivan =

Peter O'Sullivan may refer to:

- Peter O'Sullivan (Australian footballer) (1932–1972), Australian rules footballer
- Peter O'Sullivan (hurler) (1943–2024), Irish hurler
- Peter O'Sullivan (Welsh footballer) (born 1951), Welsh international footballer

== See also ==
- Peter O'Sullevan (1918–2015), British horse racing commentator
- Peter Sullivan (disambiguation)
