= Georges Colomb =

French botanist and cartoonist

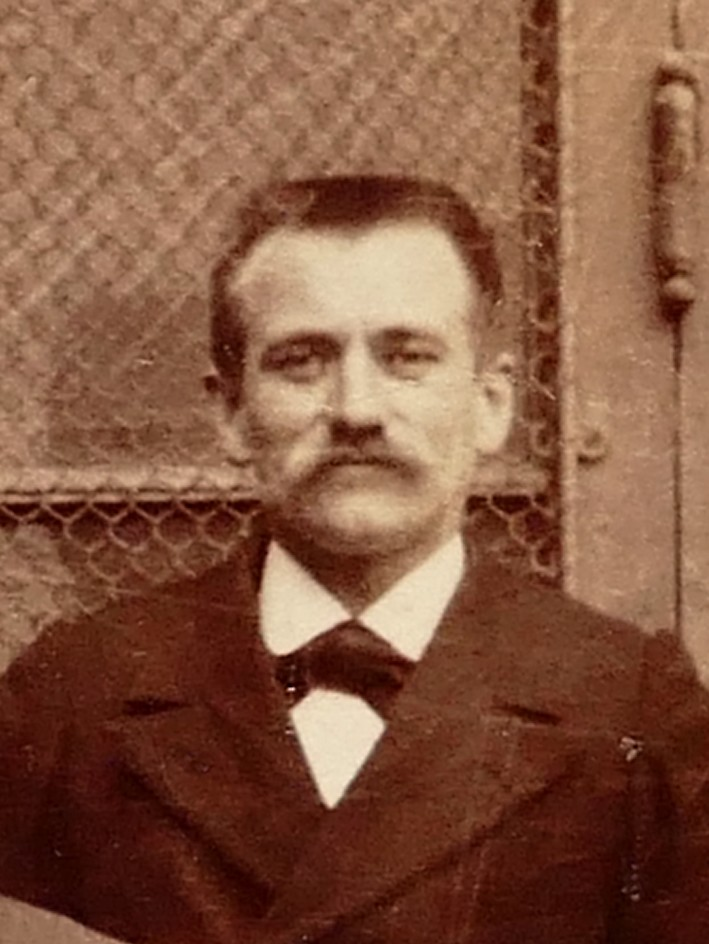
Colomb c. 1882

Marie-Louis-Georges Colomb (Lure, Haute-Saône, 25 May 1856 – Nyons, 3 January 1945) was a French botanist, science populariser, and a pioneer of French comics, known as bandes dessinées .

Under the pseudonym Christophe (playing on "Christophe Colomb", the French name for Columbus), Colomb created comics that were popular among the French intelligentsia, yet were published in Le Petit Français illustré, a children's paper. His popular L'idée fixe du savant Cosinus (1893–1899) featured a brilliant, absent-minded scientist. His other comics included La Famille Fenouillard (1889); Le Sapeur Camember (1890–1896); Les Malices de Plick et Plock (1893–1904); and Le Baron de Cramoisy (1899).

Colomb's works were comic sketches exploring the quirks of his title characters. Images to him were more vital than words in communicating with children (the dialogue and Colomb's editorial remarks were always outside the picture frame). His frames have been said to anticipate the "visual grammar" of movies and television.

Colomb retired as Deputy Director of the Sorbonne's botanical laboratory. Novelist Marcel Proust was a student of Colomb in his youth, and seems to have taken an interest in botany from him—Proust's À la recherche du temps perdu (In Search of Lost Time) presents botanical knowledge and speculation to such an extent that botany "constitutes an alternative lens through which the human world of the novel can be viewed."
