= Paul Senn =

Swiss photographer (1901–1953)

- Born: 14 August 1901; Rothrist, Aargau, Switzerland
- Died: 25 April 1953 (aged 51); Bern, Switzerland
- Known for: Photojournalism

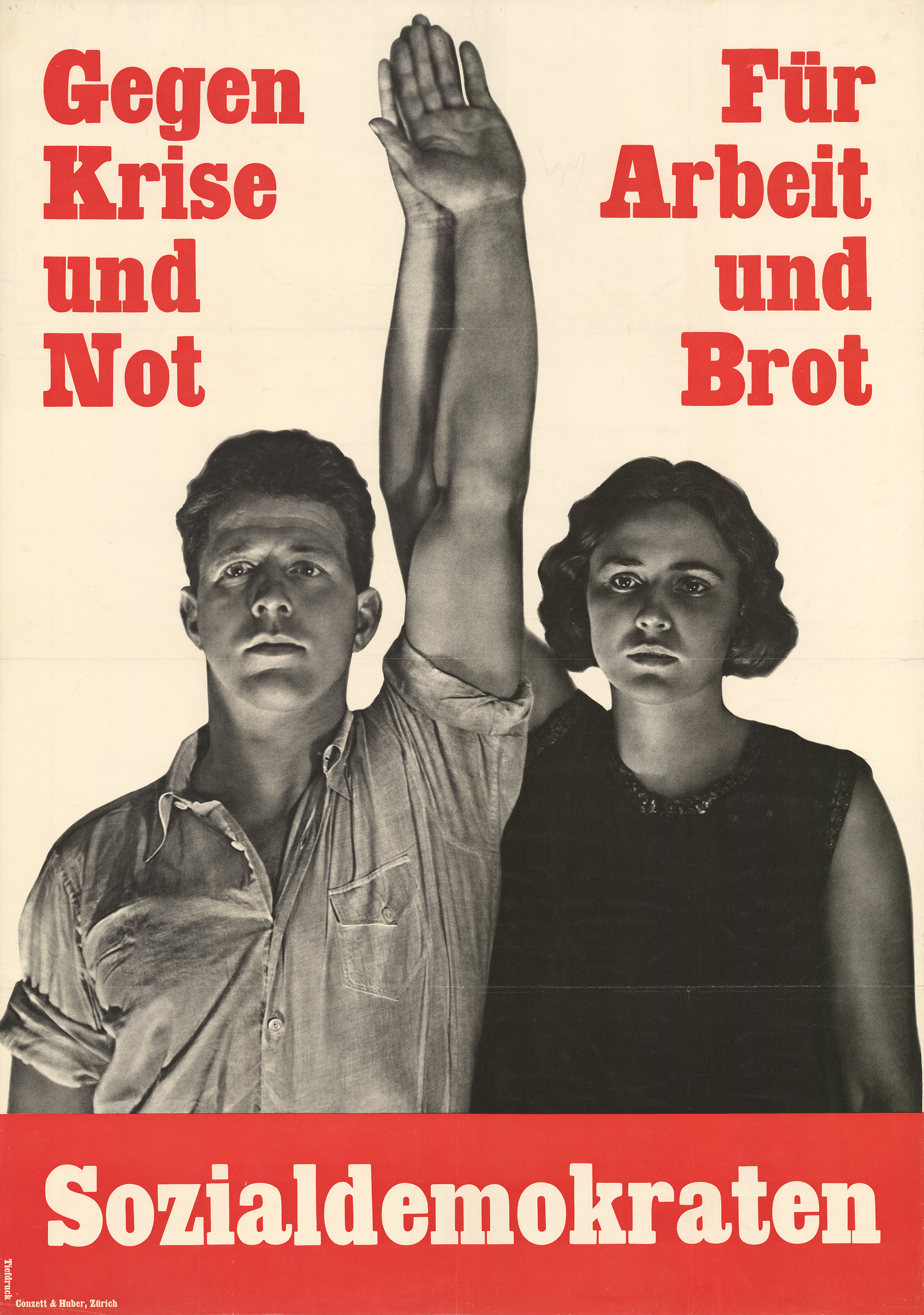
Against crisis and hardship – For work and bread, Social Democratic Party election poster (1931)

Paul Senn (14 August 1901 – 25 April 1953) was a Swiss photographer and one of the leading Swiss photojournalists between 1930 and 1950. His photography documented everyday life and working conditions in Switzerland as well as the Spanish Civil War, the Second World War and post-war Europe. His work for the Zürcher Illustrierte and later Du brought him national recognition.

== Biography ==
Paul Senn was born on 14 August 1901 in Rothrist. He completed an apprenticeship as a graphic artist in Bern between 1917 and 1921. During the 1920s, Senn worked and gained further experience as a graphic designer and advertising consultant in several European countries.

From 1924 to 1930, Senn worked as a photo editor for the Basler Nachrichten. In 1930, he established a studio in Bern and produced photographic reports for several newspapers and magazines. He lived and worked at Junkerngasse 3 in Bern’s lower Old Town.

In 1930, Arnold Kübler recruited him to the Zürcher Illustrierte, where he joined the magazine’s core photographic team. He remained with the magazine until 1941. His work for the Zürcher Illustrierte and later Du brought him national recognition during the 1930s and 1940s. He contributed to more than 40 Swiss and foreign illustrated magazines.

In 1951, Senn co-founded the Kollegium Schweizerischer Photographen. The group promoted photography shaped by the photographer's personal perspective and sought recognition of photography as an independent art form. In 1952, he became a member of the Swiss Werkbund. He died of cancer in Bern on 25 April 1953.

== Work ==
Much of Senn’s photographic work was produced for illustrated magazines as reportages that brought together images and text on political, social and everyday subjects.

=== Early work and the Spanish Civil War ===
Senn produced socially focused reportages in Europe and the United States and was an early practitioner of colour photography. In the 1930s, he made several visits to the Goms region, where he photographed everyday life in the Upper Valais. His reportage work in Switzerland included May Day demonstrations and trade union meetings. In November 1932, Senn photographed a workers’ demonstration in Geneva that was suppressed by the army, leaving 13 people dead and 65 injured.

On his first visit to Spain in 1933, Senn visited Pablo Casals. Between 1937 and 1939, he returned to Spain and produced reports on the Spanish Civil War. During his 1937 visit, he worked alongside the Swiss humanitarian organisation Ayuda Suiza. In January 1939, Senn photographed Spanish refugees crossing into France at Le Perthus. He made his first journey to the United States in 1939.

=== Second World War ===
During the Second World War, Senn served as an army photographer. His subjects included the Swiss mobilisation, work on the National Redoubt and the entry of French troops into Switzerland in 1940.

Senn's photographs of Swiss farmers and workers were published with Arnold Kübler in the 1943 volume Bauer und Arbeiter, which was associated with Switzerland’s policy of spiritual national defence. Other reportages examined juvenile institutions, Thorberg prison and the Waldau psychiatric hospital. His photographs of children placed within farming families in the 1940s have been described as important documents of twentieth-century Swiss social history. His reportages on children placed in institutions or with farming families exposed poor living conditions and caused public controversy. In 1943, Senn photographed women working from home in Eriswil.

He also documented everyday scenes in Bern’s Old Town, including tradespeople working outdoors, children playing in the streets and washing carried out on rooftops. On walks through Bern when he was not on assignment, Senn photographed scenes that caught his attention. As a resident of the lower Old Town, he knew many local people and often photographed them informally and unobtrusively.

In 1942, Senn photographed the Rivesaltes internment camp in Vichy France. During a journey to Lyon in 1943, he photographed the exhumation of French resistance fighters killed by the Nazis. The images depicted the violence more starkly than was customary in Swiss press coverage of wartime atrocities. They were published in Die Nation and the socialist magazine Aufstieg.

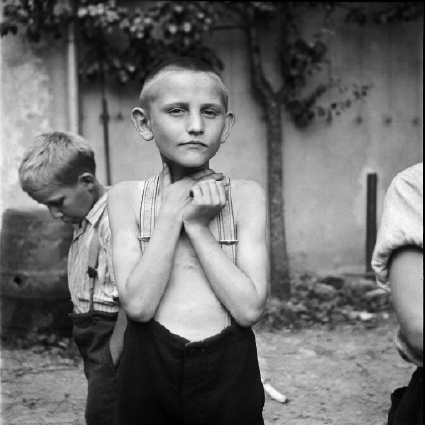
Boy at the Sonnenberg home in Kriens, canton of Lucerne (c. 1944)

Senn frequently worked with the journalist Peter Surava. In 1944, he and Surava documented inhumane conditions at the Sonnenberg boys’ home in Kriens. The home required the boys to perform hard physical work, provided little education and subjected them to mistreatment. The reporting led to the home’s closure and the conviction of its last director. In a separate 1944 report, Senn and Surava documented the case of a boy who had been sexually abused by his foster family.

=== Post-war travel and colour photography ===
From 1944 to 1947, Senn travelled through several European countries, partly on behalf of the Red Cross and Swiss relief organisations. In 1945, he photographed war-damaged Cologne and post-war Paris.

In 1946, Senn returned to the United States on assignment for the Schweizer Illustrierte Zeitung, with a particular focus on Swiss emigrant communities. He travelled across the country, visiting major cities and settlements established by Swiss emigrants. On this journey, he began using colour transparencies alongside black-and-white film. In New York, he concentrated on workers, children and marginalised people rather than the city’s familiar tourist attractions. His colour work included a photographic report on Coney Island. In 1947, Senn joined a group of Swiss journalists on a trip to Finland organised by the Schweizer Spende and also photographed reconstruction efforts in Germany.

Senn's two United States journeys resulted in approximately 10,000 negatives, 1,500 colour transparencies and 80 reports. In 1951, he undertook a journey through North and South America. The journey included a stay in Mexico.

=== Photographic approach ===
Senn’s background in graphic design influenced the formal composition of his photographs. Their pronounced tonal contrasts often gave the images a dramatic effect. His social-documentary photographs drew attention to the emotional experience of the people he depicted. Senn has been characterised as a humanist photographer.

== Legacy ==
Senn is regarded as one of the leading Swiss photojournalists between 1930 and 1950. He is also recognised as a chronicler of everyday life in Switzerland during the economic crisis and war years.

In 1982, the Gottfried Keller Foundation deposited Senn’s archive with the Kunstmuseum Bern. The holdings contain around 90,000 negatives, material from approximately 2,000 reportages and 1,000 colour transparencies.

Senn's work was shown posthumously at the Swiss Foundation for Photography in 1981, while the Kunstmuseum Bern's first comprehensive retrospective in 2007 brought renewed attention to his little-known post-war colour photography. The exhibition was accompanied by a monograph on Senn's work, bringing together an extensive selection of his photographs and previously unpublished colour images from the United States, Canada and Mexico. Further exhibitions were held in Perpignan and Rivesaltes in 2019, with the latter devoted to his photography of the Spanish Civil War.

== Gallery ==
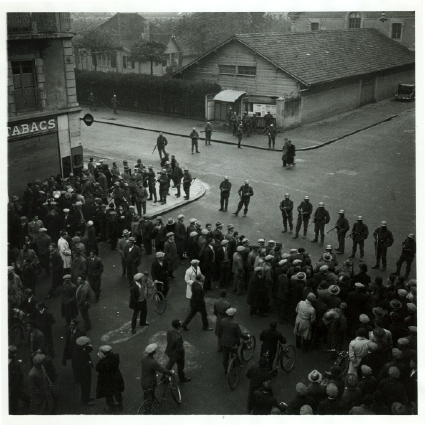
Unrest in Geneva (1932)

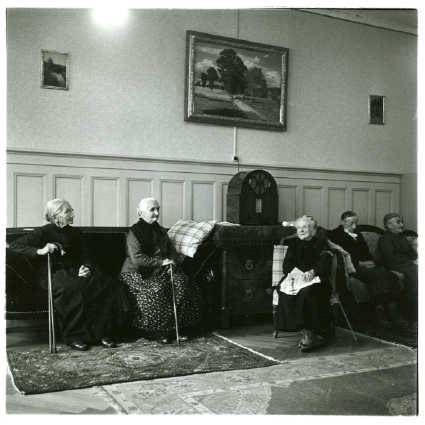
Listening to the radio at the Burgerspital Bern (1934)

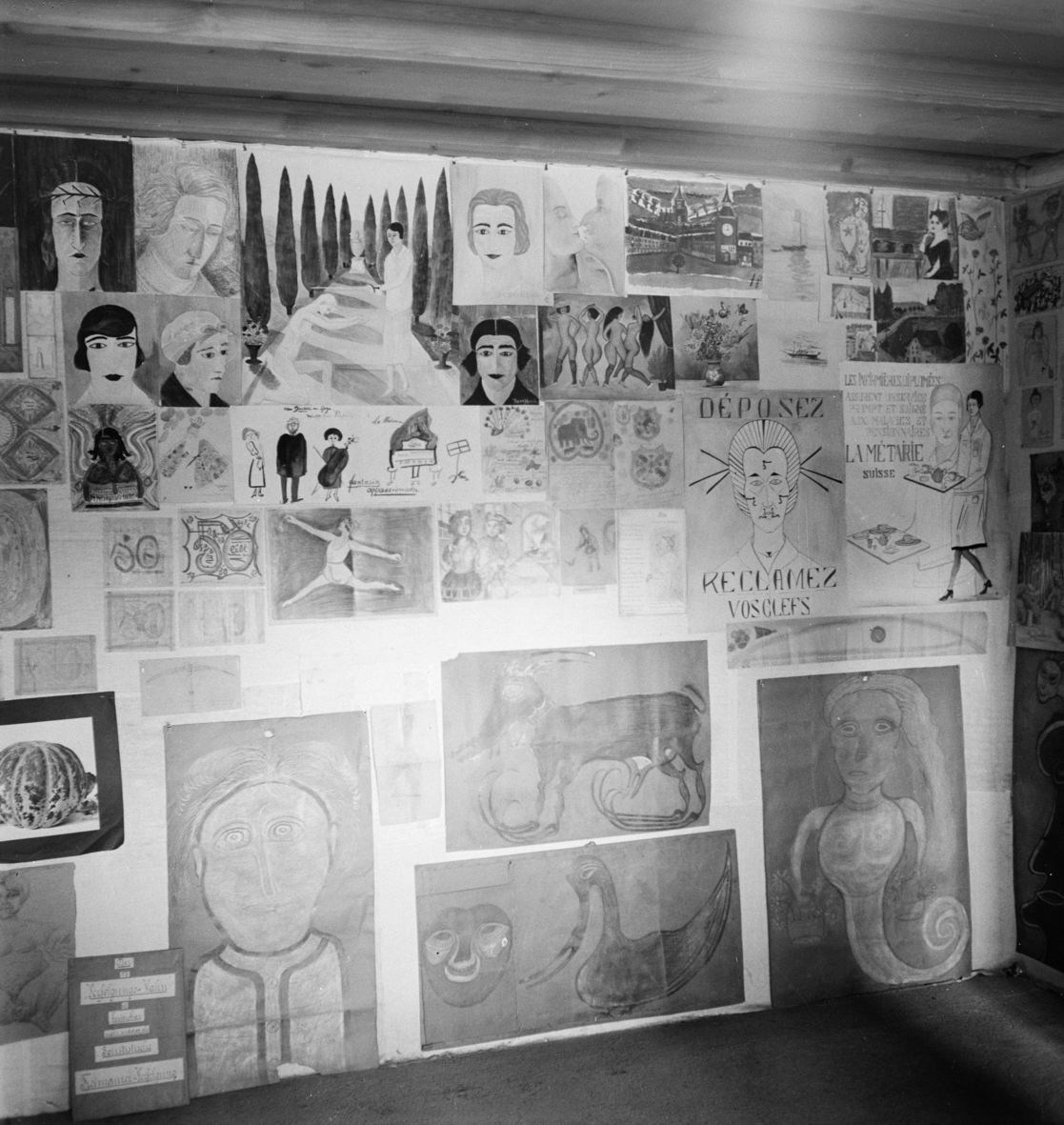
Patient artworks in the Psychiatry Museum Bern (1936)

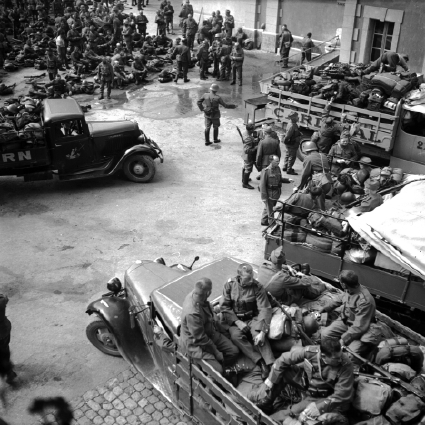
Swiss mobilisation (1939)
