= Illustrated Magazine =

Illustrated Magazine or The Illustrated Magazine may refer to:

- Hutchings' Illustrated California Magazine, San Francisco
- The English Illustrated Magazine, London

== See also ==
Disambiguation pages

- Illustrated (disambiguation)
- Illustrated News
- Illustrated Weekly
