= Sun Sentinel =

Daily newspaper published in Florida, US

- Type: Daily newspaper
- Format: Broadsheet
- Owner: Tribune Publishing
- Publisher: Nancy Meyer
- Editor: Julie Anderson
- Founded: 1910
- Headquarters: 333 S.W. 12th Ave; Deerfield Beach, Florida 33442 US
- Circulation: 15,300 Average print circulation
- ISSN: 0744-8139
- OCLC number: 45155582
- Website: www.sun-sentinel.com

The Sun Sentinel (also known as the South Florida Sun Sentinel, known until 2008 as the Sun-Sentinel, and stylized on its masthead as SunSentinel) is the main daily newspaper of Fort Lauderdale, Florida, and Broward County, and covers Miami-Dade and Palm Beach counties, as well as statewide news. It is the 4th largest-circulation newspaper in Florida. Greg Mazanec has held the position of general manager since November 2023, Gretchen Day-Bryant has held the position of executive editor since December 2024.

The newspaper was for many years branded as the Sun-Sentinel, with a hyphen, until a redesign and rebranding on August 17, 2008. The new look also removed the space between "Sun" and "Sentinel" in the newspaper's flag, but its name retained the space.

The Sun Sentinel is owned by the parent company, Tribune Publishing. This company was acquired by Alden Global Capital, which operates its media properties through Digital First Media, in May 2021.

== Overview ==
The Sun Sentinel emphasizes local news, through its Community News and Local sections. It has a daily circulation of 163,728 and a Sunday circulation of 228,906. According to industry metrics, Sun Sentinel’s online platform ranks among the top news sites in Florida in terms of monthly unique visitors.

For many years, the Sun Sentinel targeted Broward County and provided only limited news coverage in Palm Beach County. However, in the late 1990s, it expanded its coverage to all of South Florida, including Miami-Dade and Palm Beach counties. In Miami, The Miami Herald is its primary competition, while in Palm Beach County, The Palm Beach Post is the chief competition.

The Sun Sentinel website has news video from two South Florida television stations: West Palm Beach's CBS affiliate WPEC and Miami and Fort Lauderdale independent station WSFL-TV; it was a former sister station to the latter before Tribune's publishing and broadcasting interests were split. It also publishes a Spanish-language weekly, El Sentinel, as well as various community publications.

== History ==
The Sun Sentinel traces its history to the 1910 founding of the Fort Lauderdale Weekly Herald, the first known newspaper in the Fort Lauderdale area, and the Everglades Breeze, a locally printed paper founded in 1911, which promoted itself as "Florida's great Farm, Truck and Fruit Growing paper." In 1925, the Everglades Breeze was renamed the Sentinel. That same year, two Ohio publishers bought both the Sentinel and the Herald, consolidating the newspapers into a daily publication called the Daily News and Evening Sentinel. In 1926, Horace and Tom Stillwell purchased the paper. However, the devastation wrought by the 1926 Miami hurricane caused circulation to drop and, in 1929, Tom Stillwell sold the paper to the Gore Publishing Company, headed by R.H. Gore Sr. By 1945, circulation of the Daily News and Evening Sentinel had climbed to 10,000.

In 1953, Gore Publishing changed the name of the paper to the Fort Lauderdale News and added a Sunday morning edition. In 1960, when the paper had a circulation of 60,000, Gore Publishing purchased the weekly Pompano Beach Sun and expanded it into a six-day morning paper, the Pompano Sun-Sentinel—thus reviving the "Sentinel" name it had discarded seven years earlier. In 1963, the Tribune Company acquired Gore Publishing. In the 1970s, the morning paper changed its name to the Fort Lauderdale Sun-Sentinel. In 1982, the Fort Lauderdale News and Fort Lauderdale Sun-Sentinel merged their editorial staffs. The two papers then merged into a single morning paper under the Fort Lauderdale Sun-Sentinel name. In 2000, after expanding its coverage, the paper changed its name to the South Florida Sun-Sentinel.

In 2001, the Sun-Sentinel opened a full-time foreign bureau in Havana, Cuba. Shared with the Tribune Co., their Havana newsroom was the only permanent presence of any South Florida newspaper at the time.

In 2002, the Sun-Sentinel began publishing a Spanish weekly newspaper, El Sentinel. The newspaper is distributed free on Saturdays to Hispanic households in Broward and Palm Beach counties and is also available in racks in both counties. It is also available online at Elsentinel.com. In 2004, the paper won the Payne Award for Ethics in Journalism for its coverage of health and human services in the state.

On August 17, 2008, the Sun Sentinel unveiled a redesigned layout, with larger graphics, more color, and a new large "S" logo. This is in tune with another Tribune newspaper (Orlando Sentinel), which redesigned its newspaper a few months previously, and created a brand synergy with Tribune's sister operation and CW affiliate WSFL-TV (Channel 39), which relocated its operations to the Sun Sentinel offices in 2008 and adopted a logo matching the capital "S" in the new logo.

From 2011 to the present day, the newspaper made significant updates to meld print media with modern media. These advances include: launching the pure-play entertainment website SouthFlorida.com and starting a video channel called SunSentinel Originals. As a result of their media integration, the newspaper was named one of Editor & Publisher's "10 Newspapers That Do it Right". Most recently, the company had signed a deal with Gannett in order to print eight newspapers from the company, which included USA Today.

In July 2024, the journalists at the paper announced their intention to unionize.

== Awards ==
The Sun Sentinel gives annual awards to area businesses and business leaders, including Top Workplaces for People on the Move, Excalibur Award, and others.

In April 2013, the Sun Sentinel won its first gold medal in the category of Public Service Journalism, for its investigative series about off-duty police officers who engage in regular reckless speeding.

In 2014 the newspaper was named one of the "10 Newspapers That Do It Right" by Editor & Publisher magazine.

The Sun Sentinel won its second Pulitzer for Public Service in 2019 for public service for its coverage of the Stoneman Douglas High School shooting, with The Pulitzer committee crediting the Sun Sentinel "for exposing failings by school and law enforcement officials before and after the deadly shooting rampage at Marjory Stoneman Douglas High School." It also won the Pulitzer Prize for Editorial Writing in 1985 for its work on the federal low‑income housing program in Dade County.

The newspaper has also been a finalist for a Pulitzer 13 times, including for its 2005 coverage of Hurricane Wilma and an investigation into the Federal Emergency Management Agency's mismanagement of hurricane aid. (The latter investigation was featured in the PBS documentary series Exposé: America's Investigative Reports in an episode entitled "Crisis Mismanagement".) It also produced a significant contribution to information graphics in the form of News Illustrated, a weekly full-page graphic that has received more than 30 international awards. The photography department has been a finalist for the Pulitzer Prize twice in the Spot News category. It was a finalist in 1982 for its coverage of a Haitian refugee boat disaster, and again in 1999 for its powerful coverage of Hurricane Mitch in Central America.

== Controversies ==
In September 2008, a Bloomberg L.P. employee saw a six-year-old Chicago Tribune article posted on the Sun Sentinel's website about United Airlines' 2002 filing for bankruptcy and, due to the article’s unclear display, mistakenly thought it was a recent story. The employee then added it as a headline on Bloomberg Terminals. The story then made it onto Google News' front page as well. As a result, there was a massive selloff of United Airlines stock, and its share price temporarily dropped "from $12 to $3 before trading was suspended." Several days later, the SEC launched a formal preliminary investigation into the matter.

Since 2018, the Sun Sentinel has been preventing internet users in the European Union from accessing its website, due to noncompliance with data protection regulations.
