= Maestro concept =

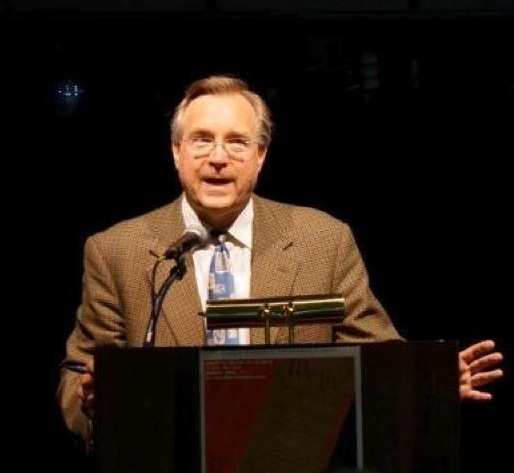
Buck Ryan, Maestro concept designer

The Maestro concept is a time-management technique used in journalism in order to assist the newsroom to work in a project-based, teamwork-intensive manner by "thinking like a reader".

The Maestro concept begins with a "great story idea" that is generated through collaborative meetings to shape stories before they are written and integrates writing, editing, photography, art, and design. The Maestro concept is not applied to all stories all the time. The concept applies only to those stories that are integrated with photographs, design elements, and infographics. It is a method designed to improve presentation of important stories through teamwork that brings the story to life and results in high impact and high readership.

== History ==
The Maestro Concept was created by Leland "Buck" Ryan, director of the Citizen Kentucky Project of the Scripps Howard First Amendment Center and tenured associate professor of journalism at the University of Kentucky's School of Journalism and Telecommunications. Ryan created the concept in the early 1990s when he was an assistant professor at Northwestern University's Medill School of Journalism. The inspiration for the Maestro concept came from a 1991 Poynter Institute study by Mario Garcia and Pegie Stark called "Eyes on the News". That study followed the eyes of readers (tracked actual eye movements) in three cities and discovered that readers do not read a newspaper as journalists believed. This study and subsequent studies, including online publications, are used in newsrooms and classrooms today as a teaching model. The original study found that good indexing for busy readers is the key to successful publishing.

The Maestro concept was developed through an "approach to newsroom management, organization and operation that applies W. Edwards Deming's management principles used in manufacturing to the creative process". Striving for quality, in both product and management, is Deming's focal point. As a statistician, Deming noted that when management focused primarily on costs, that approach over the long run drove up costs and diminished quality. Deming found that a focus by management to increase quality while reducing costs through reduction of waste and rework lowered costs in the long run. Continual improvement of the system, and not by bits and pieces, is integral to Deming's principles.

The Maestro concept debuted in April 1993 at the American Society of News Editors convention in Baltimore, Maryland. After the debut, a list of 324 newspapers in the United States, in 59 newspaper groups, and more than 50 universities and high schools showed interest in the concept by purchasing a report and video called "The Maestro Concept: A New Approach to Writing and Editing for the Newspaper of the Future". The concept's impact covers 48 states and Washington, D.C., and 16 other countries.

A part of the international impact was a maestro workshop conducted in Hanoi for Vietnamese print and online journalists in December 2006 by Buck Ryan.

In June 2010, three Russian journalism organizations invited Ryan to speak on the concept during 12 days of seminars: one was in Barnaul for the Press Development Institute-Siberia, a second in Kirov for the Russian Union of Journalists, and a third in Rostov-on-Don for the Alliance of Independent Regional Publishers of Russia. The director of the Press Development Institute-Siberia in Barnaul wrote that Ryan's "ideas spurred numerous projects that our regional newspapers are eager to carry out as soon as possible". Then, in July, Ryan visited and served as the first journalism professor in residence as he taught two journalism courses in China for three weeks at Shanghai University.

== Concept ==
The Maestro concept is a time-management technique for story planning and newsroom organization through team collaboration to shape stories early before they are written. The central concept is trying to anticipate readers’ questions about news stories (“think like a reader”) and then answering those questions as quickly as possible through visual aspects with high-visibility points such as photos, headlines, captions and information graphics. It is a management technique to encourage collaboration across news departments and ensure that quality work in a story package comes not from the traditional method of an assembly line, but from teamwork and good time-management from all players working on the story.

The Maestro concept has five points:

1. Idea-group meetings: meeting of team members to brainstorm story ideas
2. The importance of coaching writers: editors act as the "maestro" to lead writers through story development
3. The challenges of hurdling newsroom traditions: avoid the "assembly line" approach to publication in favour of holistic, reader-focused writing
4. A lesson in critiquing: "maestro" conducts follow-ups to the story to review the process and its impact

== Education ==
The inverted pyramid technique of journalism writing

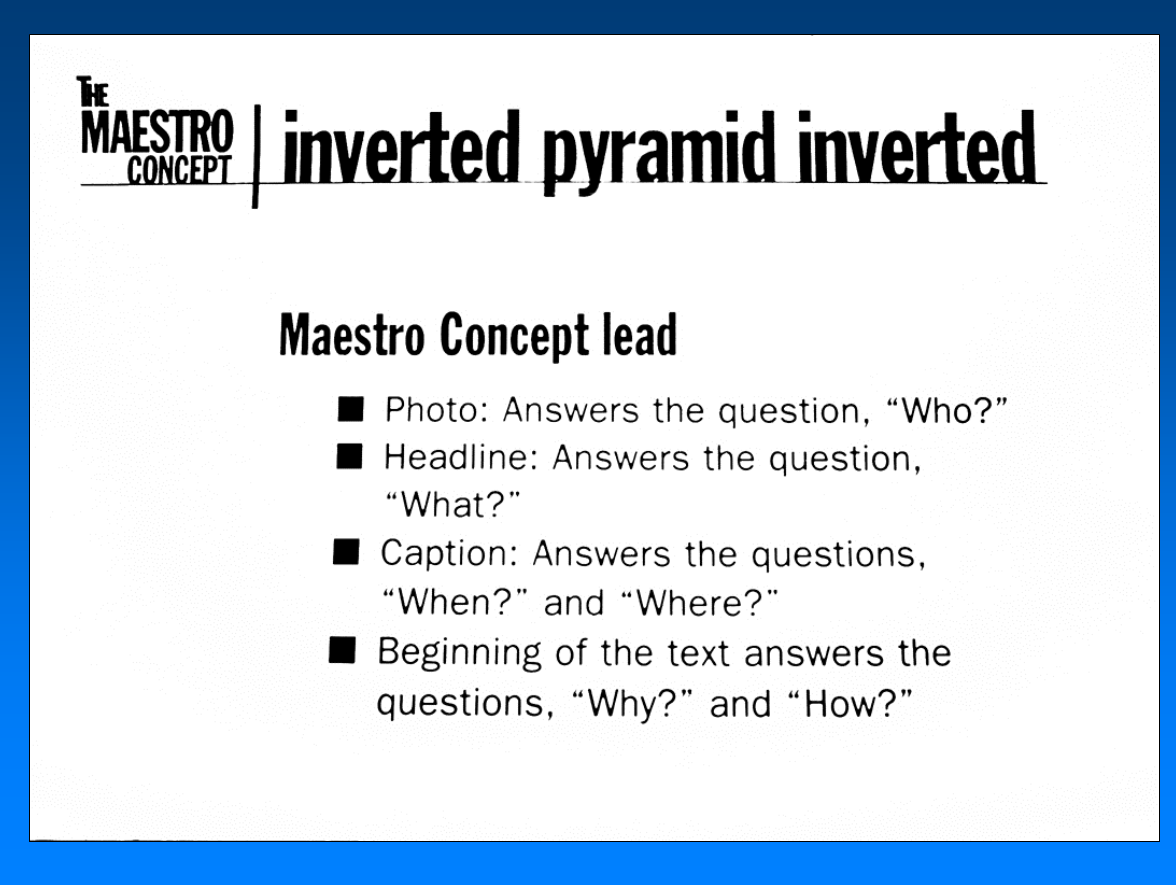
Inverted pyramid inverted technique of journalism writing

High schools have increasingly used the Maestro concept to introduce students on how a newsroom operates. The online High School Journalism Initiative has lesson plans devoted to introducing high school students to the concept. One lesson plan titled "conducting the orchestra: how to implement maestro" details how students can be taught to build small teams that are able to motivate, be productive and encourage quality throughout the school year. High schools have reported that since the concept was introduced, students who have never before worked together find that they can coordinate fully reported stories and photos in one day. Besides meeting deadlines, students working together see that their story packages are of higher quality and often have a greater page presence.

"The Maestro Concept" is presented in and is the title of Chapter Eight in the 2001 book, The Editor’s Toolbox, A Reference Guide for Beginners and Professionals. Ryan co-authored the book with Michael O'Donnell.

== Four-graph approach ==
The four-graph approach to writing, editing, photography, and design is meant to efficiently create an article designed for the reader. The design is partly based on the findings in the "Eyes on the News" study that found readers typically look at photos first, headlines second, captions third, and text fourth. The goal of this approach is to engage the readers by presenting the primary factual information.

1. Who? A photo or illustration shows the readers.
2. What? A headline quickly gives reason to the visual.
3. When and Where? A caption to further engage readers.
4. The lead follows and eases the reader into the rest of story, summarizing in an inverted pyramid technique the who-what-when-where of journalism writing.
