= Assignment editor =

Newsroom job in journalism

In journalism, an assignment editor is an editor—either at a newspaper or a radio or television station—who selects, develops, and plans reporting assignments, either news events or feature stories, to be covered by reporters.

An assignment editor often fields calls from the public, who give news tips, or information about a possible story or event to be covered. Sometimes, these calls may:

- Alert editors about a disaster – perhaps something as minor as a car accident or as major as a commercial plane crash with mass casualties.
- Be someone wishing to make a complaint about corporate or governmental practices, or have information or an opinion about a major decision that a local or state government is making.
- Be something as minor as a child building the world's largest sandcastle or a budding entrepreneur wanting to promote his/her product.

Other times, the news tip may come in the form of a news release, which may either promote an event, meeting, etc. or alert editors and reporters about an upcoming news conference. Sometimes, assignment editors must sift through hundreds of news releases each day. In many cases, possibly dependent on the market, assignment editors use police scanners, listening to traffic between 911 dispatchers and police officers in the field.

Whatever the case, it is the assignment editor's job to determine what news tips and news releases are the most newsworthy and then decide which reporter to assign a story to. Those assignments are often determined based on the reporter's experience, skills, and his/her beat (e.g., police, courts, schools, city hall, county, etc.).

If a major story develops – such as a disaster or economic development – an assignment editor may enlist several reporters (in addition to whoever usually covers that beat) to cover various angles of a story. For instance, if the story is about a plant closing, one reporter may be asked to do the main story about the closing, while other reporters may be asked to do stories on such topics as employee reaction, the reaction from business and community leaders, a history of the plant (and other plant closings, if appropriate), etc.

== Required background ==
An assignment editor often has a minimum of one year of experience working for a particular news organization and a number of years of experience working in journalism, usually as a line or copy editor, or even a staff writer. An assignment editor is expected to be well versed in journalistic standards and ethics and have good knowledge of the community in which he/she works and lives.

The position is that of a commissioning editor, and its responsibilities usually entail the day-to-day management of staff writers, beat reporters, and correspondents, procuring original content from freelance writers, and managing the daily "budget meeting". Sometimes, it may be a journalist's first job as a senior editor in the newsroom, working with other editorial sections – such as copy, opinion, magazine, managing, and chief editors – alongside the breaking news desk. As more news outlets move to a digital first model, the role has changed substantially, with the emphasis shifting from page planning to commissioning time-sensitive pieces that fit a more rapid news cycle.

At many smaller daily and weekly newspapers, the role of assignment editor is often combined with an editor's other duties (e.g., an assistant editor who also lays out the pages may also be asked to assign stories to reporters).

== See also ==
- Broadcast journalism
- Newspaper
- Radio station
- Television station
- Weekly newspaper
