= Morgenthaler Collection =

Art collection

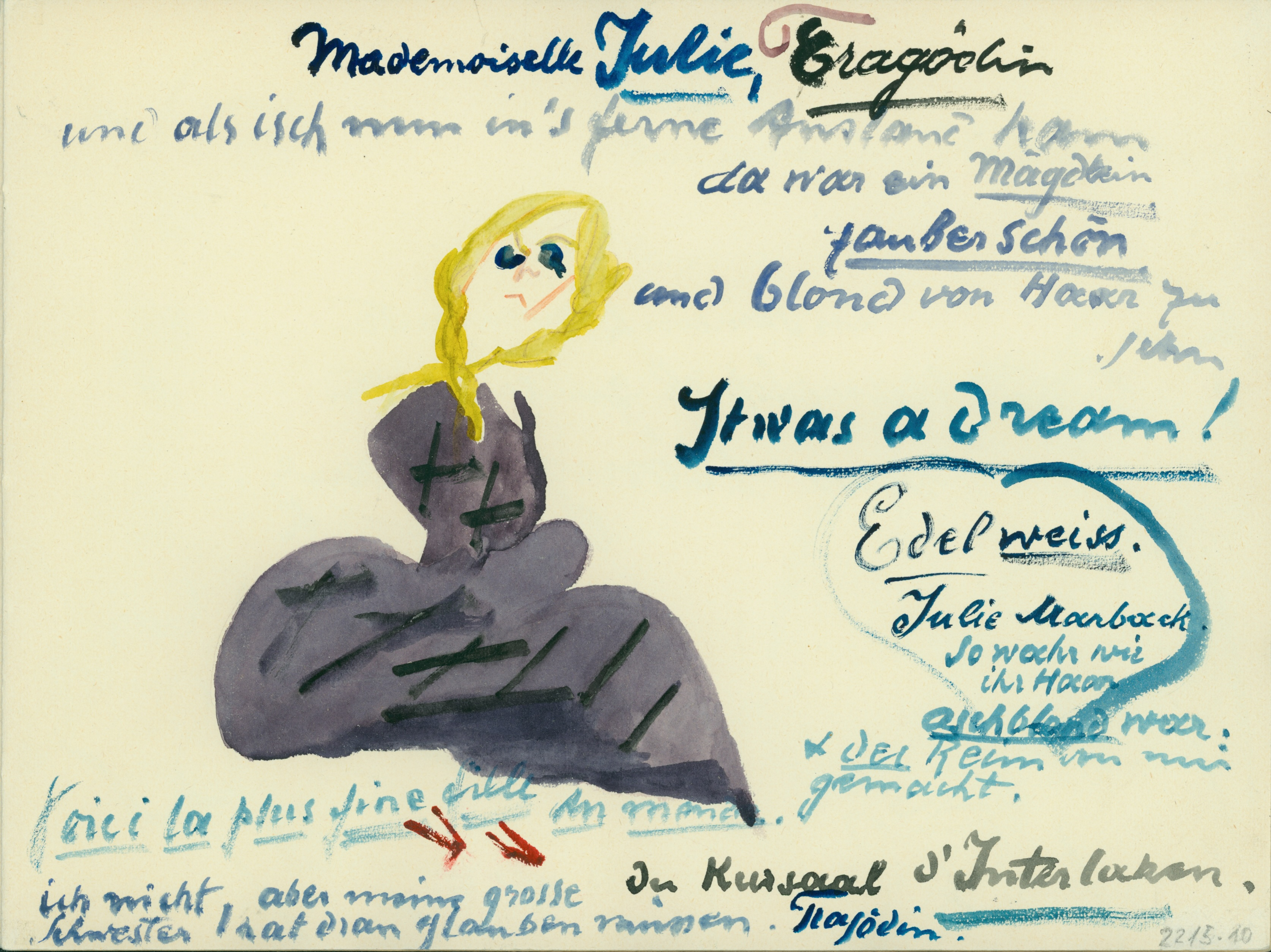
Rosa Marbach: Mademoiselle Julie, Tragödin; watercolours and coloured pencils, October 1918 (Museum of Psychiatry, Bern, Inv. 2215.10)

The Morgenthaler Collection is a collection of artistic works by patients and everyday objects from psychiatric wards, assembled from 1913 onwards by the Bernese psychiatrist Walter Morgenthaler (1882–1965) and housed at the Museum of Psychiatry in Bern (Switzerland). Along with the Prinzhorn Collection in Heidelberg and the Collection de l’Art Brut in Lausanne, it ranks among the most important collections of works of so-called "outsider art" or art brut from before 1945, which were created whilst still uninfluenced by the expectations of the art market.

== The origins of the collection ==
From 1913 onwards, whilst working as a doctor at the University Psychiatric Hospital in Bern, Morgenthaler collected objects relating to the history of psychiatry, as well as artistic works by patients, for the Swiss National Exhibition in Bern in 1914. The historical objects mainly related to coercive measures (straitjackets, restraints, head baths, restraint chairs) and were intended to represent the older, now-obsolete form of psychiatry. After the exhibition, the collection was transferred to the Waldau, where Morgenthaler used it to set up a small museum comprising two rooms.

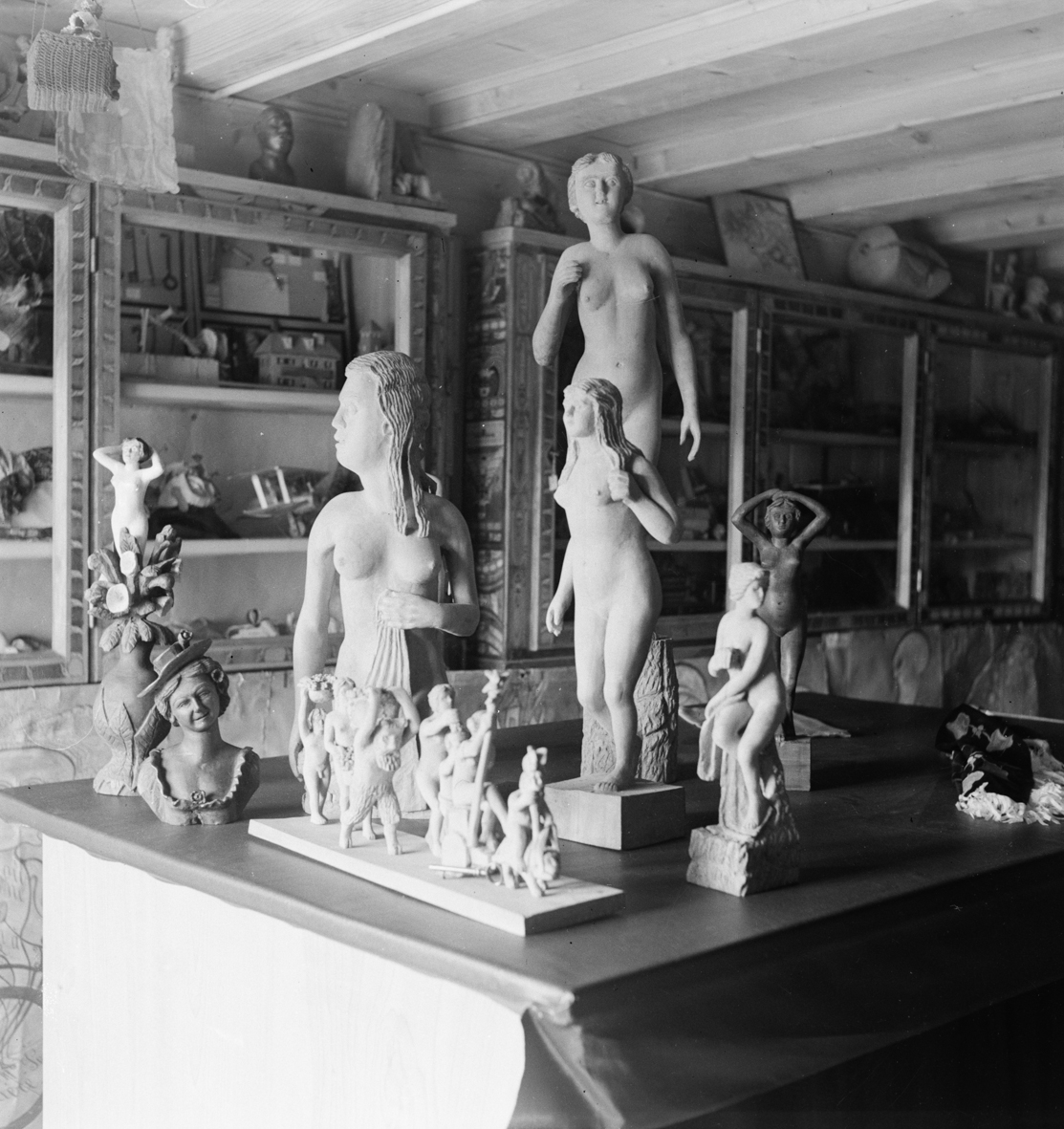
Inside the old museum. In the background are the cupboards painted by Adolf Wölfli. Photograph by Paul Senn, 1936 (Gottfried Keller Foundation).

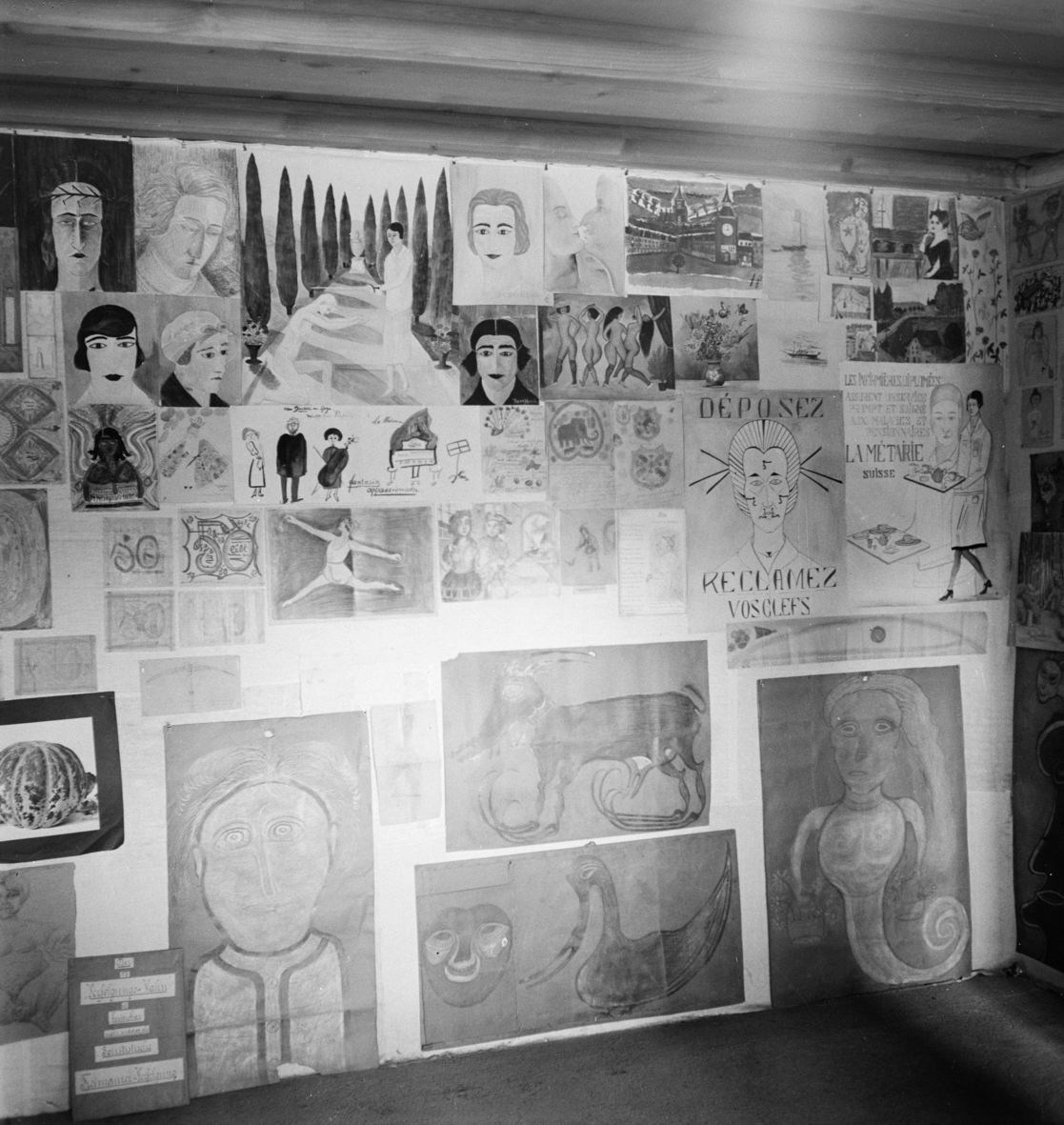
Artistic works by patients in the old museum. Photograph by Paul Senn, 1936 (Gottfried Keller Foundation).

Morgenthaler continually expanded this collection, particularly with works by patients. To this end, he combed through all of the approximately 8,000 medical records then available at the clinic and selected works from them. He also encouraged his own patients to draw. The collection formed the basis for his habilitation thesis,Transitions between Drawing and Writing in the Mentally Ill, published in 1918. Morgenthaler paid particular attention to Adolf Wölfli, several of whose works he included in his collection. Wölfli also painted two display cases and two cupboards in the museum. With his 1921 book Adolf Wölfli: A Mentally Ill Person as an Artist, Morgenthaler brought Wölfli and the art of psychiatric patients to the attention of a wider public and provided a decisive impetus for the avant-garde art movement of the interwar period. In 1920, Morgenthaler left the Waldau, but he continued to oversee the collection until the late 1920s and later added a few individual works.

== Historical collection up to 1950 ==
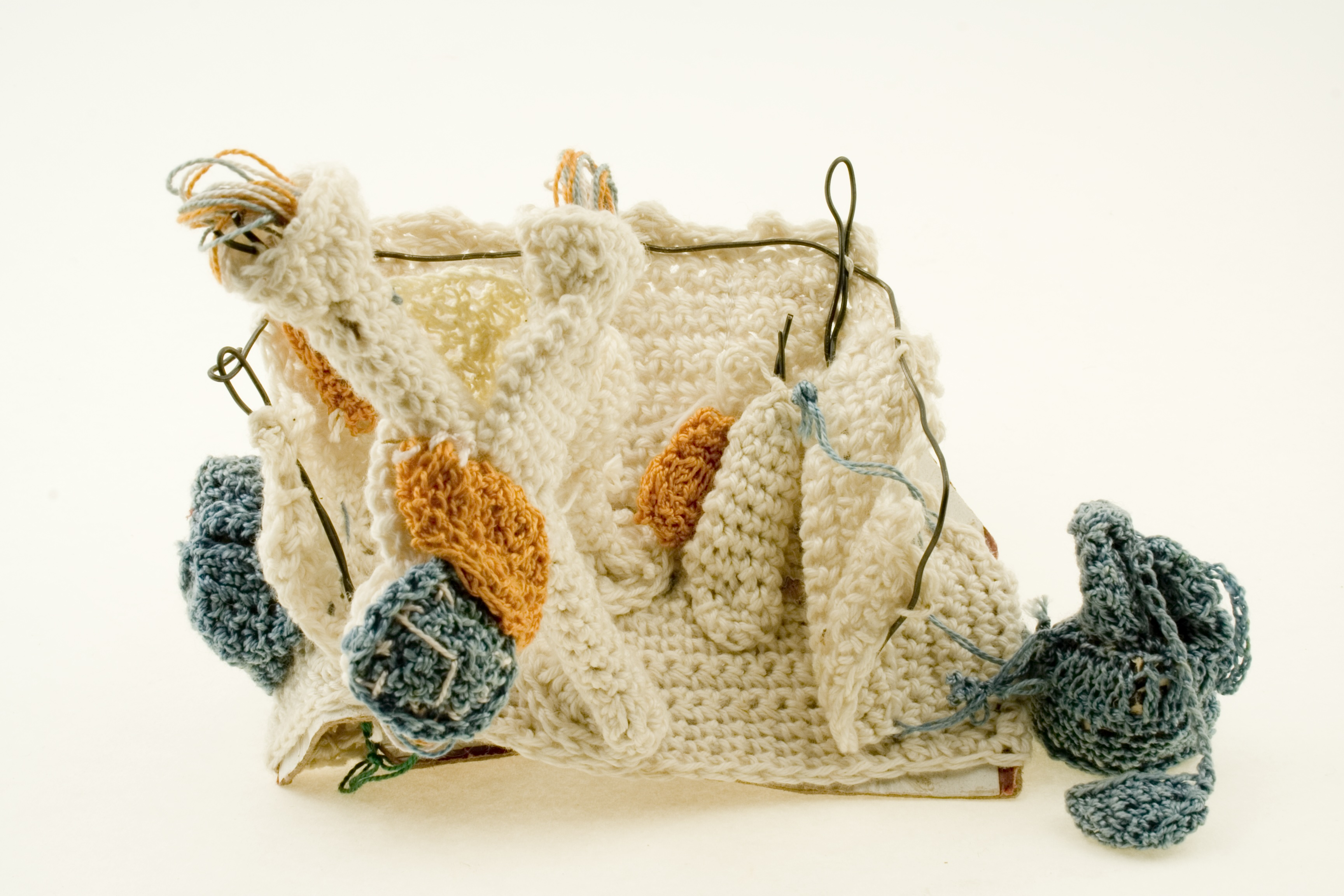
Lina Cécile Colliot: Messe à célébrer, crochet, around 1920 (Museum of Psychiatry, Bern, Inv. 961)

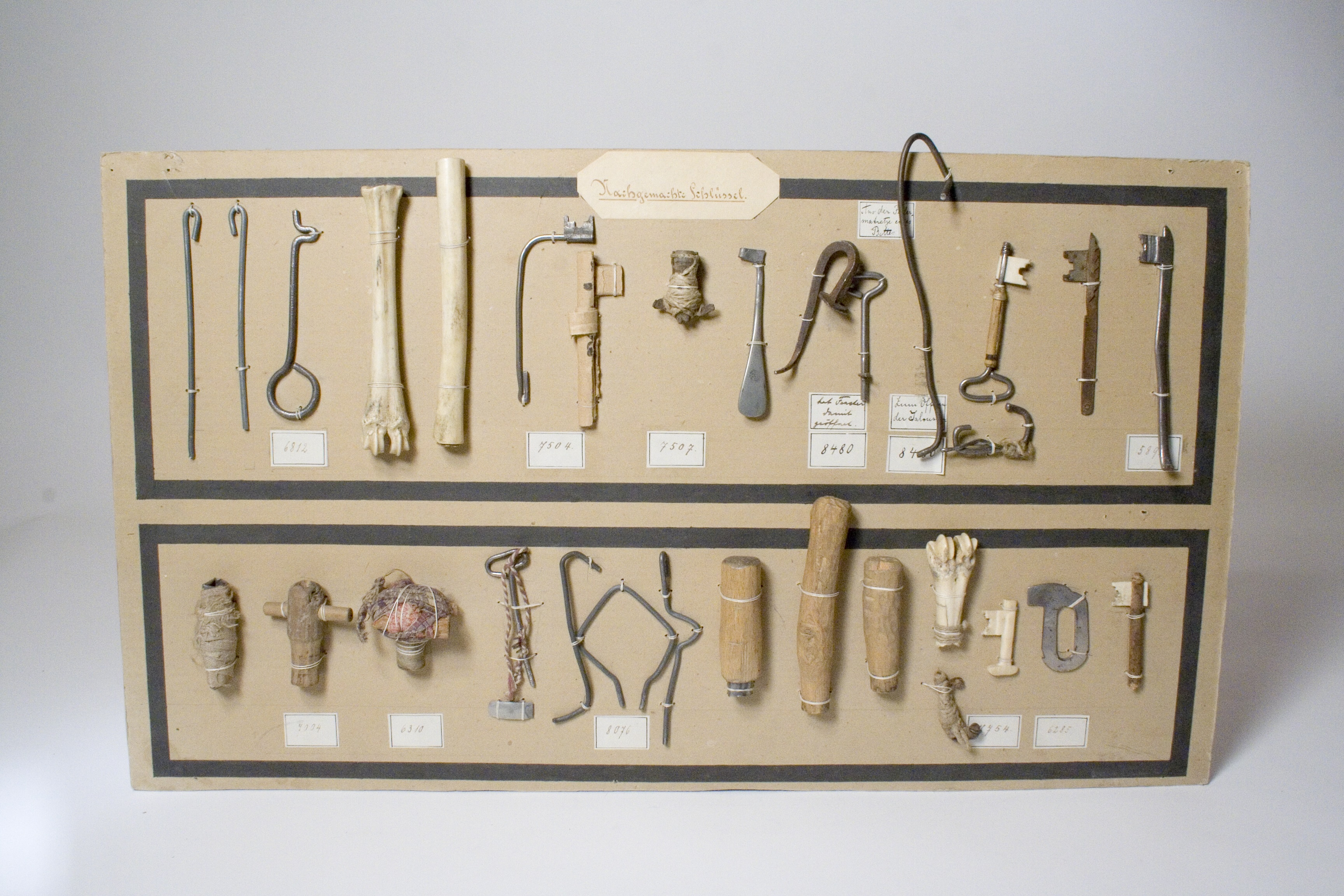
Keys made by patients, collected by Morgenthaler, around 1924 (Museum of Psychiatry, Bern, Inv. 147)

The core of the art collection, assembled by Morgenthaler – and, in a few instances, by fellow doctors – comprises around 5,000 works by some 300 patients. These include drawings, watercolours, collages, textile works and sculptural objects, mostly dating from the period 1880–1930. With a few exceptions, they originate from the Waldau. The artists include Constance Schwarztlin-Berberat (1845–1911), Heinrich Anton Müller (1869–1930), Hans Fahrni (1874–1939) and Rosa Marbach (1881–1926), as well as lesser-known figures such as Oskar Bütikofer (1860–1925), Lina Cécile Colliot (1867–1937), Louise Deci (1846–1919), Marie von Fischer-von Sinner (1868–1956), Marie Füri (1893–1929), Friedrich Kohler (1875–1960), Emma Marti (1870–1949) and Karl Schneeberger (1880–1948). The collection also includes works by patients with a classical artistic education who adhered to a more traditional style of painting, such as Friedrich Walthard (1818–1870) and Fritz Jenzer (1907–1985).

In addition to the patients’ works, the collection’s original holdings consist of objects collected by Morgenthaler relating to coercive measures, as well as a number of other items relating to life in the institution and non-artistic works by patients.

== New collection after 1950 ==
From 1963 onwards, Heinz Feldmann, a member of staff in the technical department at Waldau, took charge of the collection and began to expand it with around 5,000 objects from everyday clinical life and the running of the hospital: research instruments, equipment from the farm, beds, electrical installations, etc. With the reopening in 1993 of the old museum as the Bern Psychiatric Museum, the collection of artistic works also resumed, focusing on former patients of the clinic, many of whom were still working – and some continue to work – in the Kunstwerkstatt Waldau. These include, amongst others, Daniel Curty (1960–2013), Ursula Demmler (born 1962), Gabor Dios (1953–2020), Annemarie Flückiger (born 1945), Martin Flückiger (born 1970), Marco Güdel (b. 1983), Gordian Hannemann (b. 1958), Hermann Kammer (1922–1987), Winfried Keusch (1934–2006), Heinz Lauener (born 1977), Bruno Layer (born 1952), Louisa Johanna Morgentau (born 1962), Margrit Roth (1955–2013), Philippe Saxer (1965–2013) and Jonas Scheidegger (born 1981).

== Impact ==
In 1945, Jean Dubuffet visited Morgenthaler and the collection at the Waldau, acquired a number of works by Morgenthaler, and through publications and exhibitions drew attention to Wölfli and other artists under the term art brut. In 1963, Harald Szeemann presented works from the Morgenthaler Collection, the Prinzhorn Collection and Dubuffet’s collection at the Berner Kunsthalle in the exhibition Insania pingens. At Documenta 5 in Kassel in 1972, Szeemann reconstructed Wölfli’s cell and a room from the small Waldau Museum containing artworks from the Morgenthaler Collection in the section Art by the Mentally Ill (Bildnerei der Geisteskranken). This marked the definitive recognition of Wölfli and "outsider art" as an integral part of the international art world.

The particular focus on Wölfli led to his works from the Morgenthaler Collection being transferred to the Adolf Wölfli Foundation, established in 1975. The rest of the collection received little attention for a long time. It was not until the reopening in 1993 of the old museum in a new form under the name Psychiatrie-Museum (Museum of Psychiatry Berne, that the objects and works of art were once again brought to the attention of a wider public through exhibitions and loans.

== Exhibition catalogues with artworks ==
- Werner Jutzeler, Marie Louise Käsermann: Von Bildwelten in der Psychiatrie. Katalog zur Ausstellung im Psychiatrie-Museum Bern. Bern: EditionSolo, 2003. ISBN 3-9522759-0-5.
- Werner Jutzeler, Marie Louise Käsermann: Von Tieren umgeben sind Menschen. Katalog zur Ausstellung in der Klinik für Psychiatrie Altenburg und im Psychiatrie-Museum Bern. Bern: EditionSolo, 2004. ISBN 978-3-9522759-3-1.
- Werner Jutzeler, Marie Louise Käsermann: Von Bildern als Spiegel der Seele. Katalog zur Ausstellung im Psychiatrie-Museum Bern und in der Klinik für Psychiatrie Altenburg. Bern: EditionSolo, 2006. ISBN 978-3-9522759-6-2.
- Werner Jutzeler, Marie-Louise Käsermann, Andreas Altorfer: Der Himmel ist blau & Nackt sein. Werke aus der Sammlung Morgenthaler, Waldau. Bern: Edition solo, 2008. ISBN 978-3-9522759-9-3.
