= Le Petit Français illustré =

French newspaper

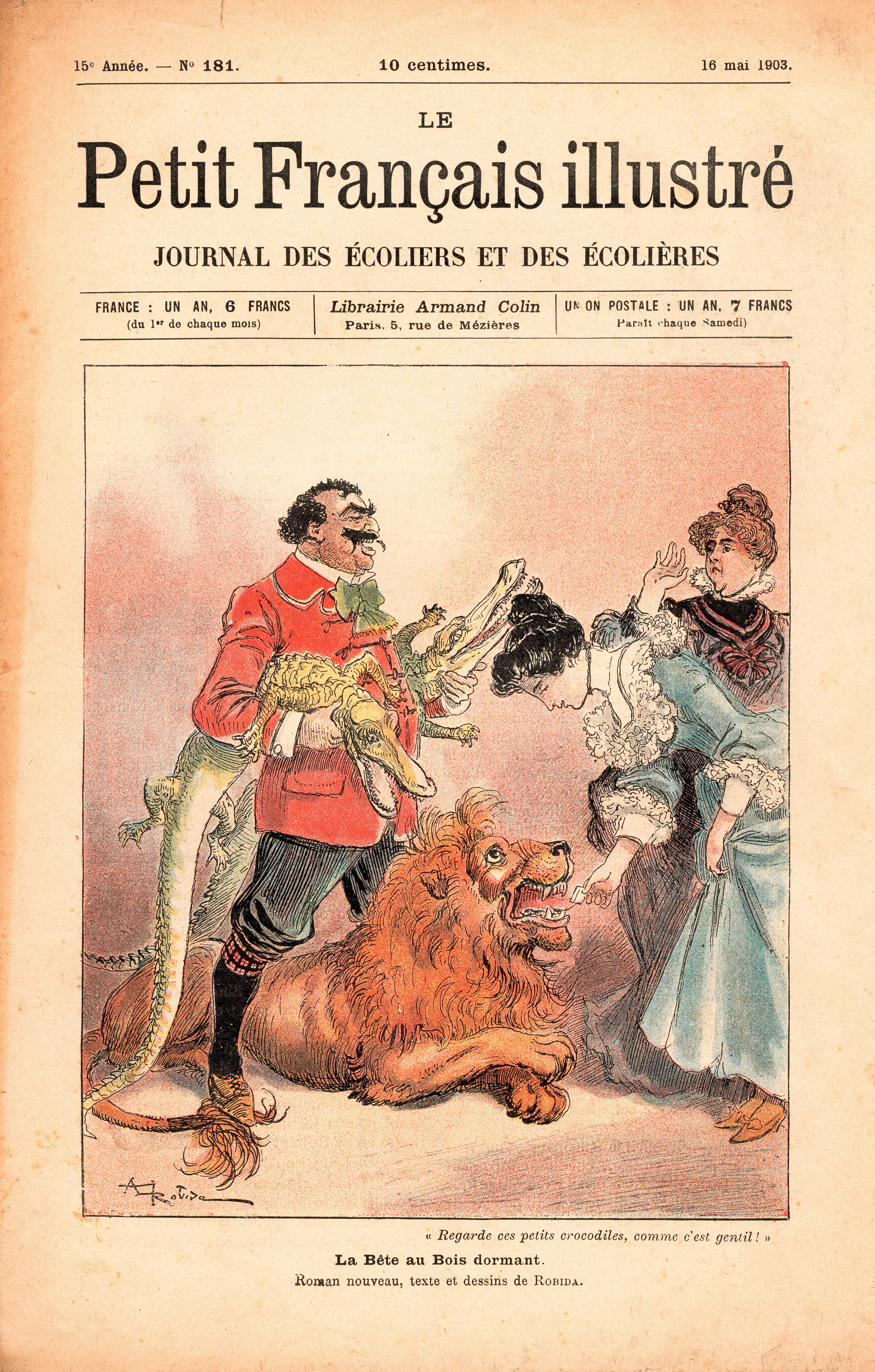
- Le Petit Français illustré, no. 181 (16 May 1903), cover illustration by Albert Robida
- Founded: 1889

Le Petit Français illustré was a French newspaper for schoolchildren established in 1889, consisting mainly of soap-opera-like stories ("feuilletons"). From its beginnings through 1904, it featured a number of bandes dessinées (comic strips) by France's pioneering comic artist Georges Colomb (under the pseudonym "Christophe"), which were popular with educated adults as well as children. Artists such as Albert Robida also contributed to the newspaper.
