= Horns Illustrated =

American magazine

- Editor: Carissa Stith
- Frequency: Nine times a year
- Publisher: James Schleicher
- Founded: 1990
- Company: Texan Media LLC
- Country: USA
- Based in: Austin, TX
- Language: English
- Website: www.hornsillustrated.com

Horns Illustrated is a print and digital publication based in Austin, Texas, that covers University of Texas at Austin athletics. The magazine was started in 1990. It features interviews, athlete profiles, in-depth analysis and game recaps, game previews, and a calendar of events.

There are 9 issues of the magazine a year that are published monthly except for April, August and September. The readership of the magazine is estimated over 50,000.

The editor of the magazine is UT alum Carissa Stith. The art director is also a UT alum, Martha Gazella-Taylor. The publisher is James Schleicher. The owner/investor is Rick Gross.

The magazine used to be owned by First Down Publications Inc., based out of Tulsa, Oklahoma, but was sold to Ramser Media LLC in September 2002. Texan Media LLC acquired Horns Illustrated in June 2011.

The typical issue contains the same basic sections such as a calendar, a news section ("Roundup"), spotlights on freshmen and sophomore athletes ("Young Guns"), highlights of Longhorn alumni ("Where Are They Now?"), and a recap of the latest UT football game ("Five Questions").
