= Military Illustrated =

- Categories: Military history
- Frequency: Monthly
- First issue: 1986
- Final issue: 2011
- Company: ADH Publishing
- Country: United Kingdom
- Based in: London
- Language: English
- ISSN: 0268-8328

Military Illustrated was a long-running military history magazine first published in the United Kingdom by Military Illustrated Ltd founded by Martin Windrow (editor) and Alan Greene. The magazine was subsequently sold to Publishing News Ltd. From September 2007 publication was taken over by ADH Publishing. It ceased in 2011.

== History and profile ==
Military Illustrated was first published in 1986 on a bi-monthly basis, and sub-titled Past & Present. This sub-title was subsequently dropped, and the magazine became a monthly publication. Early issues of the magazine concentrated on uniforms and equipment, as well as occasional articles on modelling and military artists. The editor from issue 70 (March 1994) to date is Tim Newark.

The magazine subsequently changed to coverage of battles, campaigns and general military history including naval and aviation. Most articles are on World War II and earlier history. More recent campaigns such as Vietnam, Korea, Falklands War, and the first Gulf War are occasionally featured. Issue 275 (April 2011) is the last issue of the magazine to be published on paper. The magazine was only available for purchase online for subsequent issues until it was closed due to financial reasons.
