= Newsroom =

Home for journalism

A newsroom is the central place where journalists—reporters, editors, and producers, associate producers, news anchors, news designers, photojournalists, videojournalists, associate editors, residence editor, visual text editor, Desk Head, stringers along with other staffers—work to gather news to be published in a newspaper, an online newspaper or magazine, or broadcast on radio, television, or cable. Some journalism organizations refer to the newsroom as the city room.

== Print publication newsrooms ==
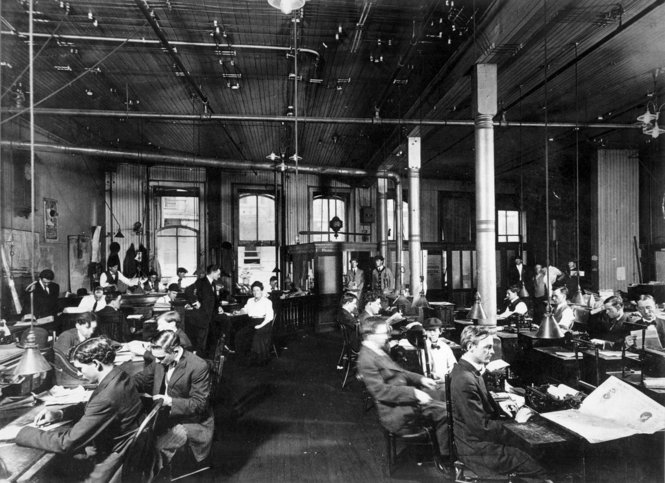
Reporters, editors and staff at work in the newsroom of The Times-Picayune, 1900

In a print publication's newsroom, reporters sit at desks, gather information, and write articles or stories, in the past on typewriters, in the 1970s sometimes on specialized terminals, then after the early 1980s on personal computers or workstations. These stories are submitted to editors, who usually sit together at one large desk, where the stories are reviewed and possibly rewritten. Reporters generally used the inverted pyramid method for writing their stories, although some journalistic writing used other methods. Some of the work of Tom Wolfe is an example of reporting that did not follow that style.

Once finished, editors write a headline for the story and begin to lay it out (see publishing) on a newspaper or magazine page. Editors also review photographs, maps, charts or other graphics to be used with a story. At many newspapers, copy editors who review stories for publication work together at what is called a copy desk, supervised by a copy desk chief, night editor, or news editor. Assignment editors, including the city editor, who supervise reporters' work, may or may not work with the copy desk.

How a newsroom is structured and functions depends in part on the size of the publication and when it is published, especially if it is a daily newspaper, which can either be published in the morning (an a.m. cycle) or the evening (a p.m. cycle). Most daily newspapers follow the a.m. cycle.

In almost all newspaper newsrooms, editors customarily meet daily with the chief editor to discuss which stories will be placed on the front page, section front pages, and other pages. This is commonly called a "budget meeting" because the main topic of the meeting is the budgeting or allocation of space in the next issue.

Newsrooms often have an assignment desk where staffers monitor emergency scanners, answer telephone calls, faxes and e-mails from the public and reporters. The assignment desk is also responsible for assigning reporters to stories or deciding what is covered and what isn't. In many newsrooms, the assignment desk is raised a step or two above the rest of the newsroom, allowing staffers who work at the desk to see everyone in the newsroom.

In some newsrooms, a teamwork-integrated system called the Maestro Concept has been applied to improve time management of the newsroom. This maestro system is a method to improve the presentation of stories to busy readers in today's media. Teamwork and collaboration bring a story to life from an initial idea by integrating reporting with photographs, design and information graphics.

== Changes in newsrooms ==
The modern American newsroom has gone through several changes in the last 50 years, with computers replacing typewriters and the Internet replacing Teletype terminals. More ethnic minority groups as well as women are working as reporters and editors, including many managerial positions. Many newspapers have internet editions, and at some, reporters are required to meet tighter deadlines to have their stories posted on the newspaper website, even before the print edition is printed and circulated. However, some things haven't changed; many reporters still use paper reporter's notebooks and the telephone to gather information, although the computer has become another essential tool for reporting.

== Broadcast newsrooms ==
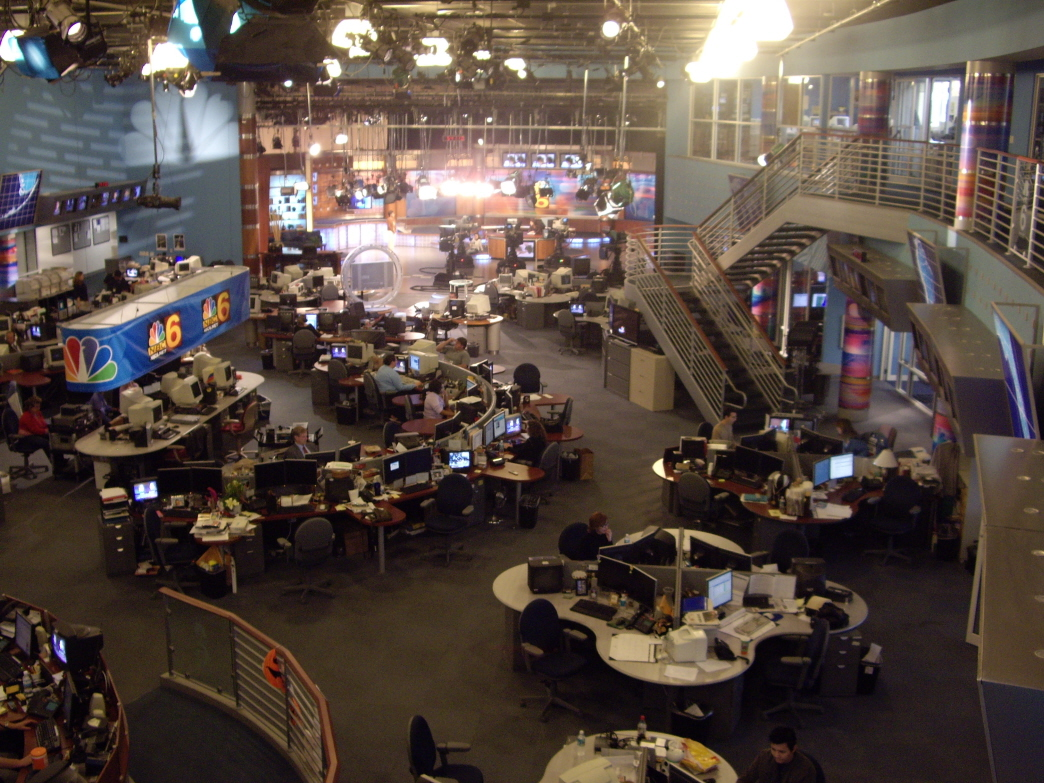
The newsroom of a broadcast television station, WTVJ, Miami, Florida

Broadcast newsrooms are very similar to newspaper newsrooms. The two major differences are that these newsrooms include small rooms to edit video or audio and that they also exist next to the radio or television studio.

Broadcast newsrooms have undergone substantial transformations in recent years, influenced by the digital revolution and shifts in audience preferences. These changes are integral to modern news production, and they encompass the following key developments: digital transition, multimedia journalism, social media engagement, live reporting, remote news production, and data-driven journalism.

== Newsroom Computer Systems (NRCS) ==
Newsroom Computer Systems (NRCS) are sophisticated software and hardware solutions utilized in broadcast newsrooms to streamline the news production process. These systems serve several crucial purposes, including Content Management, Collaboration, Workflow Management, Integration, Scheduling, Publishing and Archiving.

Newsroom Computer Systems are indispensable in modern broadcast newsrooms, enhancing the efficiency, accuracy, and speed of news production, especially in an era characterized by rapid digital transformation and evolving audience expectations for on-demand, multimedia news content.

== Newsrooms in popular culture ==
- The American newsroom has been a location of many books, movies and television shows about the newspaper and magazine business, especially movies like His Girl Friday, All the President's Men or The Paper, and television shows like The Mary Tyler Moore Show, Lou Grant, and Murphy Brown.
- The newsroom of a Canadian television station is the location of the CBC Television comedy The Newsroom. It is also shown on some public television stations in the United States.
- The 2004 film Anchorman: The Legend of Ron Burgundy, is set around a newsroom.
- The American television drama series The Newsroom is set in the newsroom of a cable news channel.
- Drop the Dead Donkey is a British sitcom set in a TV newsroom; it is notable in that each episode was filmed a day before broadcast, in order to incorporate references to current events.
