= Society for News Design =

The Society for News Design (SND), formerly known as the Society of Newspaper Design, is an international organization for professionals working in the news sector of the media industry, specifically those involved with graphic design, illustration, web design and infographics.

== History ==
The Society of Newspaper Designers was founded in 1979. It was renamed The Society of Newspaper Design in September 1981, and Society for News Design in October 1997.

From October 23 to 25, 2015, SND organized the second edition of the Creative News Design at Dubai Knowledge Village at Dubai (UAE).

On 3 November 2017, SND organized the first London conference: "The Future of Media is Visual". Keynote speakers were The New York Times Magazine art director Matt Willey and the graphic designer Neville Brody. A few months earlier, The New York Times' website had been awarded 86 design awards by the Society.

== Description ==
The Society of Newspaper Design is a United States-registered non-profit organization with about 1,500 members worldwide. Among other activities, it runs an annual Best of News Design competition open to newspapers from around the world at Syracuse University every February, an updated Best of Digital Design international competition at Ball State University, and a yearly conference (rotating through various cities) that brings in visual journalists from all over the world.

SND also has a number of offshoot organizations, including student chapters (the largest including those at Ohio University, Michigan State University, the University of Missouri and Syracuse University) and international chapters.

SND holds a number of regional and international events, with the purpose of educating and allowing opportunities for members to network. The society's annual fall workshop rotates through various cities around the world. Although generally in the United States, the workshop has visited locations in Canada, Puerto Rico, Denmark and Spain and Argentina (2009). The weekend-long event has featured a number of guest speakers on a variety of topics along with critiques, an auction and an awards dinner.

Throughout the year, SND members put on a number of one-to-two-day educational quick courses held throughout the world and designed to focus on a specific visual journalism topic.

Officers serve a one-year term and are selected by election of the SND membership. While the positions are decided on by election, historically most positions are held by prior position holders in a hierarchical style, in this way officers have generally progressed up a leadership ladder through other areas on the board of directors.

== Publications ==
The organization publishes a number of publications throughout the year:

- Best of News Design, a yearly full-color book featuring images of the winners of the society's annual news design competition (OCLC 687736742), formerly called Best of Newspaper Design through volume 30, 2008 (ISSN 1520-4251, OCLC 39484124)
- Design magazine, a biannual full-color magazine notable for changing its typography with every issue and focusing on the latest news design trends (ISSN 1520-4243, OCLC 9667091)
- SND Update, a web-based (formerly print) newsletter that tends to focus more on breaking industry news and organization-related events (ISSN 1520-426X, OCLC 23294875)
- Área-11, the digital newsletter in Spanish for Mexico, Central & South America (R-11 & 12)
