= The Illustrated Australian News =

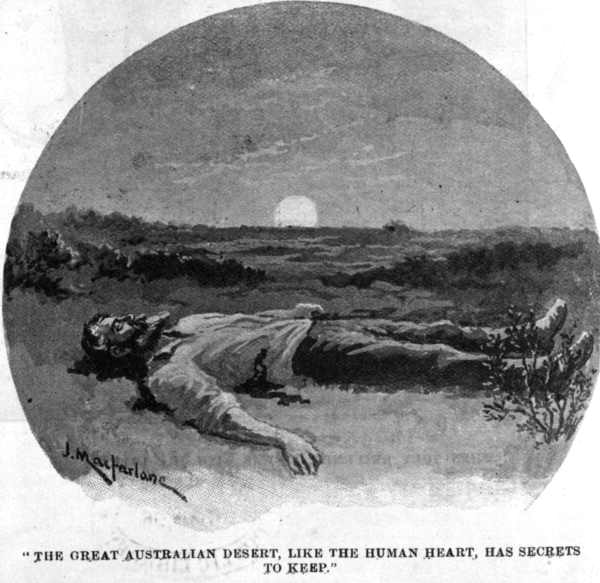
Man lying dead in the desert, a bleeding wound in his side. From the Illustrated Australian News

The Illustrated Australian News was a monthly news magazine of record in Melbourne, Victoria, Australia. Its precursor Illustrated Australian News for Home Readers was first published in 1837 by Ebenezer Syme and David Syme. The title was later changed to The Illustrated Australian News and Musical Times and finally shortened to The Illustrated Australian News from no. 233 (26 January 1876) through to the final edition, no. 408 (1 May 1889).
