= The Illustrated War News =

Time
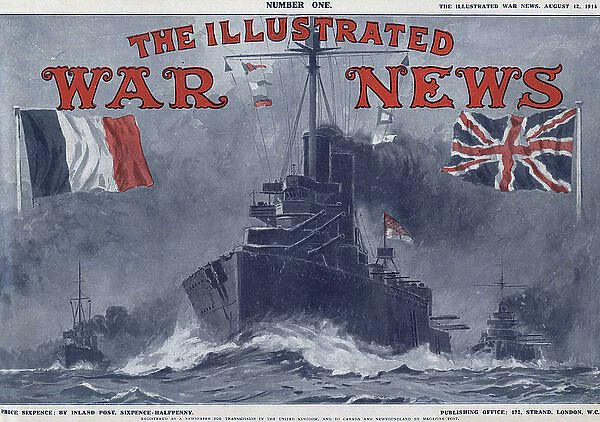
- Cover of the August 1914
- Categories: News magazine
- Frequency: 1914–1918
- First issue: August 12, 1914; 112 years ago
- Final issue: 1918
- Country: United Kingdom
- Language: English
- OCLC: 863777421

The Illustrated War News with first issue, Volume 1, dated 12 August 1914, was a weekly magazine during the First World War, published by the Illustrated London News and Sketch Ltd. of London, England.

== History ==
At the outbreak of the war, the magazine The Illustrated London News began to publish illustrated reports related entirely to the war and entitled it The Illustrated War News. The magazine comprised 48 pages of articles, photographs, diagrams and maps printed in landscape format. From 1916 it was issued as a 40-page publication in portrait format. It was reputed to have the largest number of artist-correspondents reporting on the progress of the war. It ceased publication in 1918.
