= The Illustrated Weekly Hudd =

The Illustrated Weekly Hudd is a comedy sketch series that ran on the BBC from 1966 to 1967, starring Roy Hudd.

The series incorporated myriad comedic styles, elaborate make-up and costume changes, and a diverse array of locations in order to create a singular visual style. The series featured (in addition to Hudd) Doug Fisher, Sheila Steafel, Patrick Newell and Marcia Ashton. Writers included Eric Davidson, Graham Chapman, Dick Vosburgh, and Dave Freeman. It was produced by James Gilbert. All 22 episodes have been wiped by the BBC.
