= Illustrated Police News (Boston) =

The Illustrated Police News (ca. 1860–1904) or the Police News was a weekly periodical published in Boston, Massachusetts. In a popular, sensationalist syle it reported news of crime and legal proceedings with stories about, for instance, Billy the Kid and Bat Masterson. Editors or owners included John Stetson and A. H. Millett.
