= Redpath's Illustrated Weekly =

1880s New York City newspaper

- Redpath's Illustrated Weekly cover, December 14, 1882
- Type: Weekly newspaper
- Publisher: J. A. McGee
- Editor: James Redpath
- Headquarters: 15 Park Place, New York City
- Original title held until September 1882: Redpath's McGee's Illustrated Weekly

Redpath's Illustrated Weekly was a newspaper based out of New York City in the 1880s that was dedicated to the interests of the Irish.

== History ==
James Redpath, an American abolitionist turned publisher, traveled to western Ireland to report on famine and the land war in 1880–1881. Upon his return to New York Redpath founded this newspaper under the name Redpath's McGee Illustrated Weekly and subsequently changed its name to Redpath’s Illustrated Weekly in September 1882. He intended for the paper to retaliate against the majority of American papers that ridiculed the Irish cause. The paper supported the Land League and its leaders in Irish politics and purported that James Redpath, its editor, “will contribute to ever number an original letter on the opressionso of the British Government and the Irish Landlords in Ireland of today, drawn from Land League official documents and personal notes and private letters from distinguished Irish Priests and Patriots, at his exclusive possession.”

Redpath’s Illustrated Weekly also boasted sections for ‘Our Boys and Girls,’ the latest of Irish and American humor, the latest trends of fashion from the periodicals of Paris, Berlin, and London, and finally pictures of Irish life and prominent Irishmen. Alfred Aylward, a Boer Leader; John Boyle O’Reilly, Editor of the Boston Pilot; Dr. Robert Dwyer Joyce, Irish poet and writer; and Archbishop Thomas Croke of Cashel represent a sampling of the Irishmen of distinction featured through prominent sketches and articles gracing the covers and pages of Redpath’s Illustrated Weekly.

The American Catholic Historical Society owns and maintains a run of 95 issues of this defunct periodical at the Philadelphia Archdiocesan Historical Research Center. These same issues have been digitized by Villanova University's Digital Library and can be accessed at the external link.

Images from Redpath's Illustrated Weekly
The Market Square at Galway City, Redpath’s Illustrated Weekly, June 9, 1883.

Funeral Cortege of Miss Fanny Parnell, Passing the Astor House, Redpath’s Illustrated Weekly, November 1, 1882.

Ladies’ Department, Latest Fall Fashions, Redpath’s Illustrated Weekly, September 16, 1882.
