= Hutchings' Illustrated California Magazine =

Magazine published between 1856 and 1861

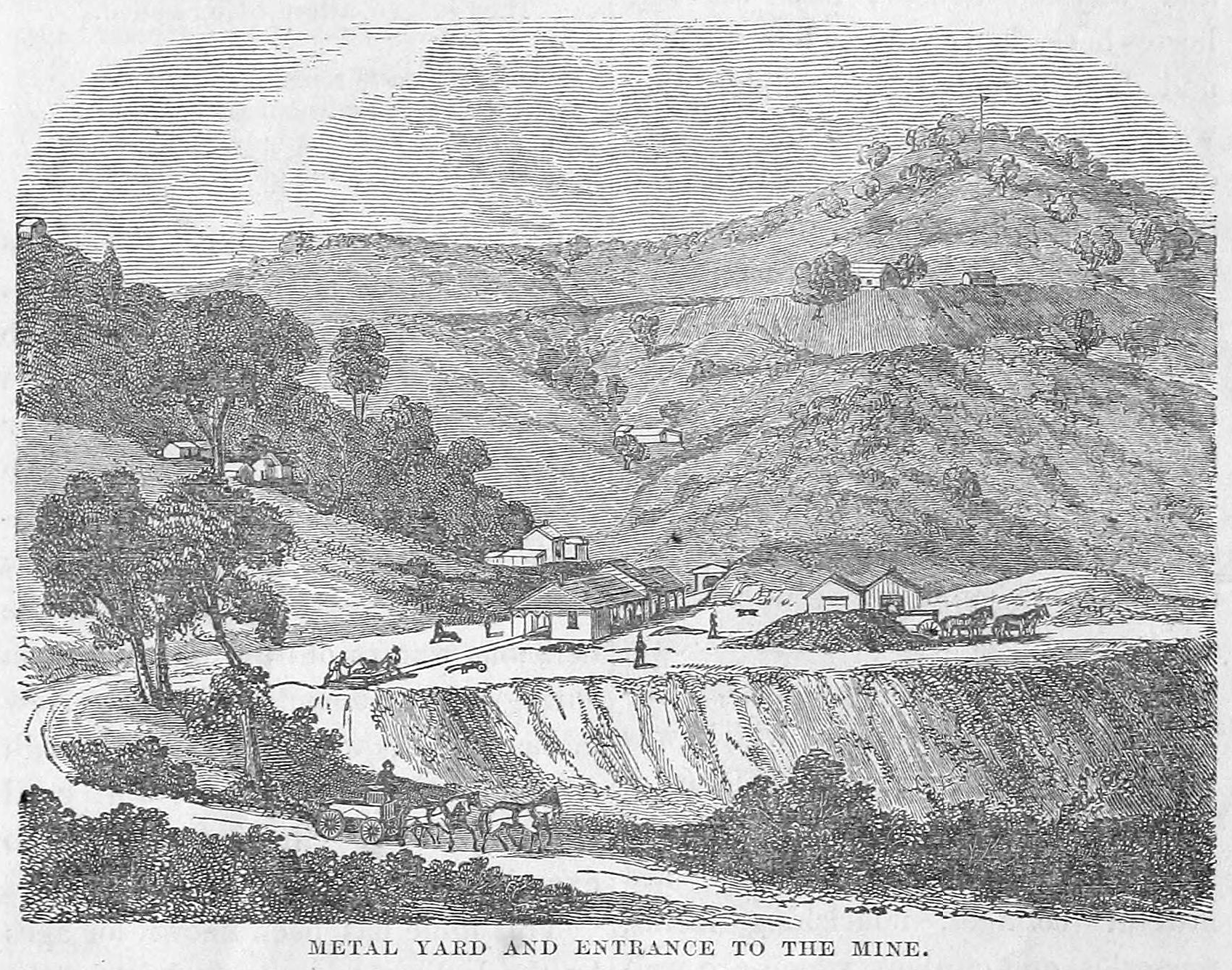
New Almaden Quicksilver Mine 1856 from Hutchings' California Magazine Vol. I No. III front cover illustration

Hutchings' Illustrated California Magazine was a magazine published between 1856 and 1861, in San Francisco, which played an important role in popularizing California in general, and to a large extent Yosemite National Park in particular.

Publisher and promoter James Hutchings was born in Towcester, England, and in 1848 came to the United States along with a vast wave of Europeans that were escaping a maelstrom of economic, political and religious oppression in the late 1840s. Shortly after he arrived gold was found in the Sierra Nevada, and Hutchings decided to seek his fortune. His was a common story insofar as he did not make a good living mining gold, but what little he did make he invested. In addition to attracting settlers to the west coast, the gold rush also brought technology, in particular printing presses, and Hutchings learned to make a moderately lucrative living publishing and selling letter sheets, which were printed broad sheets purposely left blank on the back so they could be used to write letters, something akin to large-format postcards. They became very popular among miners, who used them when they wrote home to friends and relatives in the east. Aside from making a living selling the letter sheets, as Hutchings traveled around California he gained a sense of what was important in the popular mind and came up with the idea of an illustrated magazine.

The news of the Mariposa Battalion's incursion into a valley (that the battalion members named Yosemite) for the purpose of tracking down alleged renegade Indians was fairly widely published, but the news focused on the confrontation. Hutchings was one of the few people to note the mention of a 1000-foot waterfall, and in 1854 when he was first formulating the idea of his illustrated magazine, he decided that a trip into that valley might make for interesting stories in the inaugural issue of the magazine. In the late spring of 1855 he hired artists to join him, and when the party arrived in the foothills he hired two Mi-Wuk men as guides. As the party came around Inspiration Point, they stopped long enough for Thomas Ayres to get a detailed sketch, which was published as a lithographic poster that fall, the first published image of Yosemite Valley. In June 1856, the entire account was published in Volume I of the magazine, and included five of Ayres' drawings.

The magazine was published monthly from July 1856 to June 1861, five volumes total. Although Yosemite was prominent, it was a magazine of general interest that focused on California's nascent tourist attractions. Each issue contained travel narratives, ranging from simple day trips out of San Francisco to arduous trans-Sierra treks. Longer articles were interspersed with shorter and lighter pieces, such as poetry and tables of interesting facts. The magazine popularized a number of well-known legendary stories of the West including the Pony Express, Grizzly Adams and Snowshoe Thompson. The story of the naming of Yosemite was first published in the magazine in an article by Lafayette Bunnell.
