= Infographic =

Graphic visual representation of information

A Washington Metro subway map

Infographics (a clipped compound of "information" and "graphics") are graphic visual representations of information, data, or knowledge intended to present information quickly and clearly. They can improve cognition by using graphics to enhance the human visual system's ability to see patterns and trends. Similar pursuits are information visualization, data visualization, statistical graphics, information design, or information architecture. Infographics have evolved in recent years to be for mass communication, and thus are designed with fewer assumptions about the readers' knowledge base than other types of visualizations. Isotypes are an early example of infographics conveying information quickly and easily to the masses.

== Overview ==
Infographics have been around for many years and recently the increase of the number of easy-to-use, free tools have made the creation of infographics available to a large segment of the population. Social media sites such as Facebook and Twitter have also allowed for individual infographics to be spread among many people around the world. Infographics are widely used in the age of short attention span.

In newspapers, infographics are commonly used to show the weather, as well as maps, site plans, and graphs for summaries of data. Some books are almost entirely made up of information graphics, such as David Macaulay's The Way Things Work. The Snapshots in USA Today are also an example of simple infographics used to convey news and current events.

Modern maps, especially route maps for transit systems, use infographic techniques to integrate a variety of information, such as the conceptual layout of the transit network, transfer points, and local landmarks. Public transportation maps, such as those for the Washington Metro and the London Underground map, are well-known infographics. Public places such as transit terminals usually have some sort of integrated "signage system" with standardized icons and stylized maps.

In his 1983 book The Visual Display of Quantitative Information, statistician Edward Tufte defines "graphical displays" in the following passage:

Graphical displays should

- show the data
- induce the viewer to think about the substance rather than about methodology, graphic design, the technology of graphic production, or something else
- avoid distorting what the data has to say
- present many numbers in a small space
- make large data sets coherent
- encourage the eye to compare different pieces of data
- reveal the data at several levels of detail, from a broad overview to the fine structure
- serve a reasonably clear purpose: description, exploration, tabulation, or decoration
- be closely integrated with the statistical and verbal descriptions of a data set.

Graphics reveal data. Indeed graphics can be more precise and revealing than conventional statistical computations.

== History ==
=== Early history ===
In 1626, Christoph Scheiner published the Rosa Ursina sive Sol, a book that revealed his research about the rotation of the sun. Infographics appeared in the form of illustrations demonstrating the Sun's rotation patterns.

In 1786, William Playfair, an engineer and political economist, published the first data graphs in his book The Commercial and Political Atlas. To represent the economy of 18th century England, Playfair used statistical graphs, bar charts, line graphs, area charts, and histograms. In his work, Statistical Breviary, he is credited with introducing the first pie chart.

Around 1820, modern geography was established by Carl Ritter. His maps included shared frames, agreed map legends, scales, repeatability, and fidelity. Such a map can be considered a "supersign" which combines sign systems—as defined by Charles Sanders Peirce—consisting of symbols, icons, indexes as representations. Other examples can be seen in the works of geographers Ritter and Alexander von Humboldt.

Polar area diagram by Florence Nightingale illustrating causes of mortality during the Crimean War (1857)

In 1857, English nurse Florence Nightingale used information graphics to persuade Queen Victoria to improve conditions in military hospitals. The principal one she used was the Coxcomb chart, a combination of stacked bar and pie charts, depicting the number and causes of deaths during each month of the Crimean War.

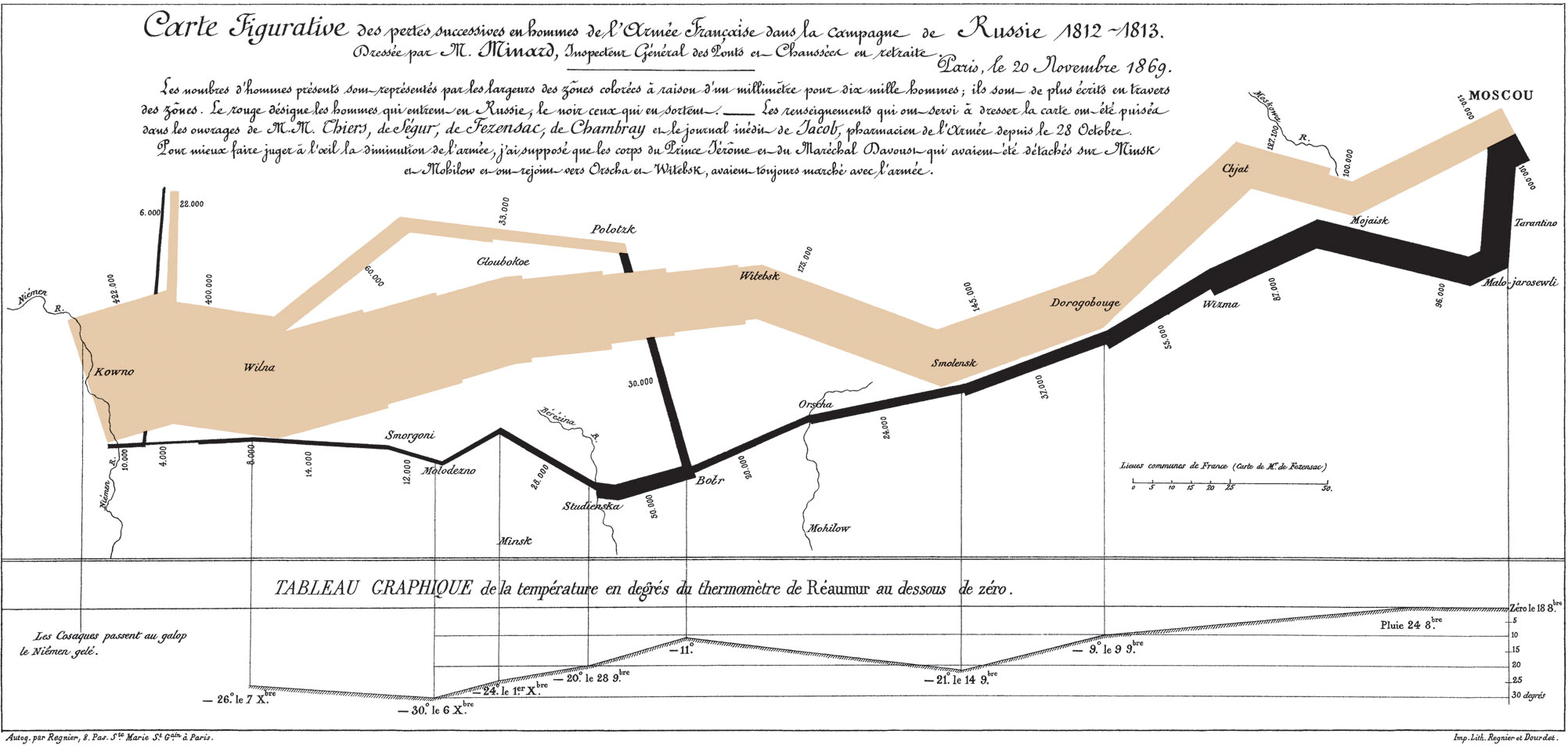
Charles Minard's information graphic of Napoleon's invasion of Russia

1869 saw the release of an influential information graphic on the subject of Napoleon's disastrous march on Moscow. The graphic's creator, Charles Joseph Minard, captured four different changing variables that contributed to Napoleon's downfall in a single two-dimensional image: the army's direction as they traveled, the location the troops passed through, the size of the army as troops died from hunger and wounds, and the freezing temperatures they experienced.

James Joseph Sylvester introduced the term "graph" in 1878 in the scientific magazine Nature and published a set of diagrams showing the relationship between chemical bonds and mathematical properties. These were also some of the first mathematical graphs.

=== 20th century ===
Circle graph shows percentage of African Americans and whites in various occupations.

In 1900, the African-American historian, sociologist, writer, and Black rights activist, W.E.B. Du Bois presented data visualizations at the Exposition Universelle (1900) in Paris, France. In addition to curating 500 photographs of the lives of Black Americans, Du Bois and his Atlanta University team of students and scholars created 60 handmade data visualizations to document the ways Black Americans were being denied access to education, housing, employment, and household wealth.

The Cologne Progressives developed an aesthetic approach to art that focused on communicating information. Gerd Arntz, Peter Alma and Augustin Tschinkel, all participants in this movement were recruited by Otto Neurath for the Gesellschafts- und Wirtschaftsmuseum, where they developed the Vienna Method from 1926 to 1934. Here simple images were used to represent data in a structured way. Following the victory of Austrofascism in the Austrian Civil War, the team moved to the Netherlands where they continued their work rebranding it Isotypes (International System of Typographic Picture Education). The method was also applied by IZOSTAT (ИЗОСТАТ) in the Soviet Union.

In 1942 Isidore Isou published the Lettrist manifesto, a document covering art, culture, poetry, film, and political theory. The included works also called metagraphics and hypergraphics, are a synthesis of writing and visual art.

In 1958 Stephen Toulmin proposed a graphical argument model, called The Toulmin Model of Argumentation. The diagram contained six interrelated components used for analyzing arguments and was considered Toulmin's most influential work, particularly in the field of rhetoric, communication, and computer science. The Toulmin Model of Argumentation became influential in argumentation theory and its applications.

In 1972 and 1973, respectively, the Pioneer 10 and Pioneer 11 spacecraft included on their vessels the Pioneer Plaques, a pair of gold-anodized aluminum plaques, each featuring a pictorial message. The pictorial messages included nude male and female figures as well as symbols that were intended to provide information about the origin of the spacecraft. The images were designed by Carl Sagan and Frank Drake and were unique in that their graphical meanings were to be understandable to extraterrestrial beings, who would have no conception of human language.

A pioneer in data visualization, Edward Tufte, wrote a series of books – Visual Explanations, The Visual Display of Quantitative Information, and Envisioning Information – on the subject of information graphics. Referred to by The New York Times as the "da Vinci of Data", Tufte began to give day-long lectures and workshops on the subject of infographics starting in 1993. As of 2012, Tufte still gives these lectures. To Tufte, good data visualizations represent every data point accurately and enable a viewer to see trends and patterns in the data. Tufte's contribution to the field of data visualization and infographics is considered immense, and his design principles can be seen in many websites, magazines, and newspapers today.

The infographics created by Peter Sullivan for The Sunday Times in the 1970s, 1980s, and 1990s were some of the key factors in encouraging newspapers to use more infographics. Sullivan is also one of the few authors who have written about information graphics in newspapers. Likewise, the staff artists at USA Today, the United States newspaper that debuted in 1982, established the goal of using graphics to make information easier to comprehend. However, the paper has received criticism for oversimplifying news stories and for creating infographics that some find emphasizes entertainment over content and data. Tufte coined the term chartjunk to refer to graphics that are visually appealing to the point of losing the information contained within them.

With vector graphics and raster graphics becoming ubiquitous in computing in the 21st century, data visualizations have been applied to commonly used computer systems, including desktop publishing and Geographic Information Systems (GIS).

Closely related to the field of information graphics is information design, which is the creation of infographics.

=== 21st century ===
By the year 2000, Adobe Flash-based animations on the Internet had made use of many key practices in creating infographics in order to create a variety of products and games.

Likewise, television began to incorporate infographics into the viewers' experiences in the early 2000s. One example of infographics usage in television and in pop culture is the 2002 music video by the Norwegian musicians of Röyksopp, for their song "Remind Me." The video was composed entirely of animated infographics. Similarly, in 2004, a television commercial for the French nuclear technology company Areva used animated infographics as an advertising tactic. Both of these videos and the attention they received have conveyed to other fields the potential value of using information graphics to describe complex information efficiently.

With the rise of alternatives to Adobe Flash, such as HTML 5 and CSS3, infographics are now created in a variety of media with a number of software tools.

The field of journalism has also incorporated and applied information graphics to news stories. For stories that intend to include text, images, and graphics, the system called the maestro concept allows entire newsrooms to collaborate and organize a story to successfully incorporate all components. Across many newsrooms, this teamwork-integrated system is applied to improve time management. The maestro system is designed to improve the presentation of stories for busy readers of media. Many news-based websites have also used interactive information graphics in which the user can extract information on a subject as they explore the graphic.

Many businesses use infographics as a medium for communicating with and attracting potential customers. Information graphics are a form of content marketing and have become a tool for internet marketers and companies to create content that others will link to, thus possibly boosting a company's reputation and online presence.

Religious denominations have also started using infographics. For example, The Church of Jesus Christ of Latter-day Saints has made numerous infographics to help people learn about their faith, missionaries, temples, lay ministry, and family history efforts.

Infographics are finding a home in the classroom as well. Courses that teach students to create their own infographics using a variety of tools may encourage engagement in the classroom and may lead to a better understanding of the concepts they are mapping onto the graphics.

With the popularity of social media, infographics have become popular, often as static images or simple web interfaces, covering any number of topics. Such infographics are often shared between users of social networks such as Facebook, Twitter, Pinterest, Google+ and Reddit. The hashtag #infographic was tweeted 56,765 times in March 2012 and at its peak 3,365 times in a span of 24 hours.

== Analysis ==
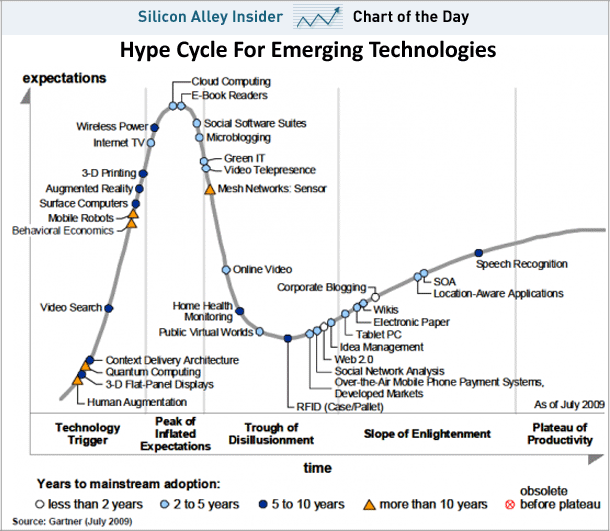
A chart attempting to depict business expectations about emerging technologies as of July 2009

The three parts of all infographics are the visual, the content, and the knowledge. The visual consists of colors and graphics. There are two different types of graphics – theme, and reference. These graphics are included in all infographics and represent the underlying visual representation of the data. Reference graphics are generally icons that can be used to point to certain data, although they are not always found in infographics. Statistics and facts usually serve as the content for infographics and can be obtained from any number of sources, including census data and news reports. One of the most important aspects of infographics is that they contain some sort of insight into the data that they are presenting – this is the knowledge.

Infographics are effective because of their visual element. Humans receive input from all five of their senses (sight, touch, hearing, smell, taste), but they receive significantly more information from vision than any of the other four. Fifty percent of the human brain is dedicated to visual functions, and images are processed faster than text. The brain processes pictures all at once, but processes text in a linear fashion, meaning it takes much longer to obtain information from text. Entire business processes or industry sectors can be made relevant to a new audience through a guidance design technique that leads the eye. The page may link to a complete report, but the infographic primes the reader making the subject-matter more accessible. Online trends, such as the increasingly short attention span of Internet users, has also contributed to the increasing popularity and effectiveness of infographics.

When designing the visual aspect of an infographic, a number of considerations must be made to optimize the effectiveness of the visualization. The six components of visual encoding are spatial, marks, connection, enclosure, retinal properties, and temporal encoding. Each of these can be utilized in its own way to represent relationships between different types of data. However, studies have shown that spatial position is the most effective way to represent numerical data and leads to the fastest and easiest understanding by viewers. Therefore, the designers often spatially represent the most important relationship being depicted in an infographic.

There are also three basic provisions of communication that need to be assessed when designing an infographic – appeal, comprehension, and retention. "Appeal" is the idea that communication needs to engage its audience. Comprehension implies that the viewer should be able to easily understand the information that is presented to them. And finally, "retention" means that the viewer should remember the data presented by the infographic. The order of importance of these provisions depends on the purpose of the infographic. If the infographic is meant to convey information in an unbiased way, such as in the domains of academia or science, comprehension should be considered first, then retention, and finally, appeal. However, if the infographic is being used for commercial purposes, then appeal becomes most important, followed by retention and comprehension. When infographics are being used for editorial purposes, such as in a newspaper, the appeal is again most important but is followed first by comprehension and then retention.

However, the appeal and the retention can in practice be put together with the aid of a comprehensible layout design. Recently, as an attempt to study the effect of the layout of an infographic on the comprehension of the viewers, a new Neural Network-based cognitive load estimation method was applied on different types of common layouts for the infographic design. When the varieties of factors listed above are taken into consideration when designing infographics, they can be a highly efficient and effective way to convey large amounts of information in a visual manner.

== Data visualization ==
Data visualizations are often used in infographics and may make up the entire infographic. There are many types of visualizations that can be used to represent the same set of data. Therefore, it is crucial to identify the appropriate visualization for the data set and infographic by taking into consideration graphical features such as position, size, shape, and color. There are primarily five types of visualization categories – time-series data, statistical distributions, maps, hierarchies, and networking.

=== Time-series ===
A stacked graph showing the changing distribution of processor families in TOP500 supercomputers since 1996

Time-series data is one of the most common forms of data visualization. It documents sets of values over time. Examples of graphics in this category include index charts, stacked graphs, small multiples, and horizon graphs. Index charts are ideal to use when raw values are less important than relative changes. It is an interactive line chart that shows percentage changes for a collection of time-series data based on a selected index point. For example, stock investors could use this because they are less concerned with the specific price and more concerned with the rate of growth. Stacked graphs are area charts that are stacked on top of each other, and depict aggregate patterns. They allow viewers to see overall patterns and individual patterns. However, they do not support negative numbers and make it difficult to accurately interpret trends. An alternative to stacked graphs is small multiples. Instead of stacking each area chart, each series is individually shown so the overall trends of each sector are more easily interpreted. Horizon graphs are a space efficient method to increase the data density of a time-series while preserving resolution.

=== Statistical ===
A histogram graph showing the numerical distribution of petal lengths (cm) recorded from Iris flower data set

Statistical distributions reveal trends based on how numbers are distributed. Common examples include histograms and box-and-whisker plots, which convey statistical features such as mean, median, and outliers. In addition to these common infographics, alternatives include stem-and-leaf plots, Q–Q plots, scatter plot matrices (SPLOM) and parallel coordinates. For assessing a collection of numbers and focusing on frequency distribution, stem-and-leaf plots can be helpful. The numbers are binned based on the first significant digit, and within each stack binned again based on the second significant digit. On the other hand, Q–Q plots compare two probability distributions by graphing quantiles against each other. This allows the viewer to see if the plot values are similar and if the two are linearly related. SPLOM is a technique that represents the relationships among multiple variables. It uses multiple scatter plots to represent a pairwise relation among variables. Another statistical distribution approach to visualize multivariate data is parallel coordinates. Rather than graphing every pair of variables in two dimensions, the data is repeatedly plotted on a parallel axis, and corresponding points are then connected with a line. The advantage of parallel coordinates is that they are relatively compact, allowing many variables to be shown simultaneously.

=== Maps ===
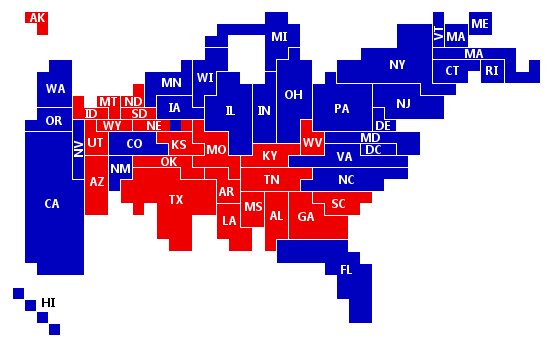
A cartogram showing the final electoral results of the 2008 US presidential election

Maps are a natural way to represent geographical data. Time and space can be depicted through the use of flow maps. Line strokes are used with various widths and colors to help encode information. Choropleth maps, which encode data through color and geographical region, are also commonly used. Graduated symbol maps are another method to represent geographical data. They are an alternative to choropleth map and use symbols, such as pie charts for each area, over a map. This map allows for more dimensions to be represented using various shapes, sizes, and colors. Cartograms, on the other hand, completely distort the shape of a region and directly encode a data variable. Instead of using a geographic map, regions are redrawn proportionally to the data. For example, each region can be represented by a circle and the size/color is directly proportional to other information, such as population size.

=== Hierarchies ===
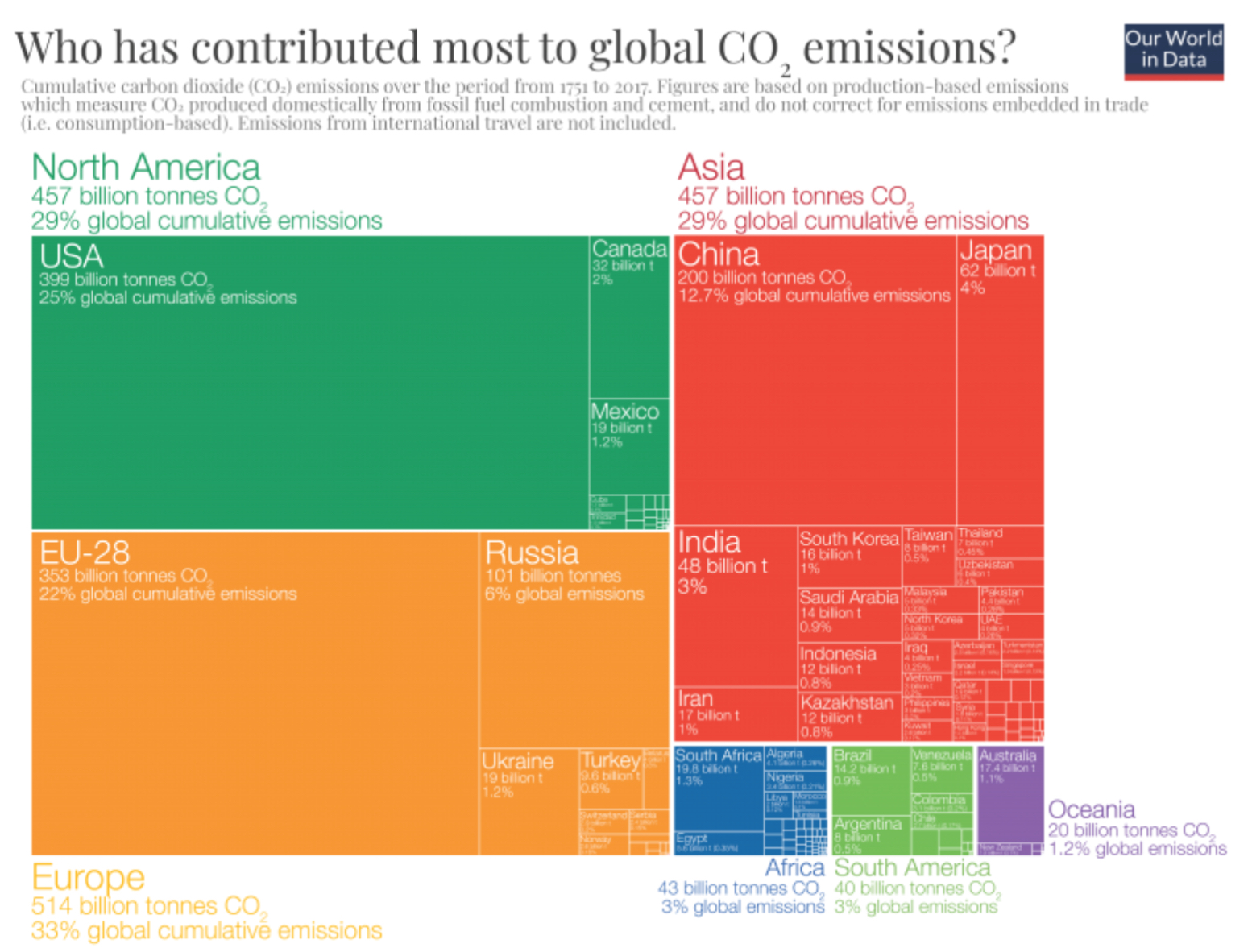
Infographic with a title and colour groupings labelled

Many data sets, such as spatial entities of countries or common structures for governments, can be organized into natural hierarchies. Node-link diagrams, adjacency diagrams, and enclosure diagrams are all types of infographics that effectively communicate hierarchical data. Node-link diagrams are a popular method due to the tidy and space-efficient results. A node-link diagram is similar to a tree, where each node branches off into multiple sub-sections. An alternative is adjacency diagrams, which is a space-filling variant of the node-link diagram. Instead of drawing a link between hierarchies, nodes are drawn as solid areas with sub-sections inside of each section. This method allows for size to be easily represented than in the node-link diagrams. Enclosure diagrams are also a space-filling visualization method. However, they use containment rather than adjacency to represent the hierarchy. Similar to the adjacency diagram, the size of the node is easily represented in this model.

=== Networks ===
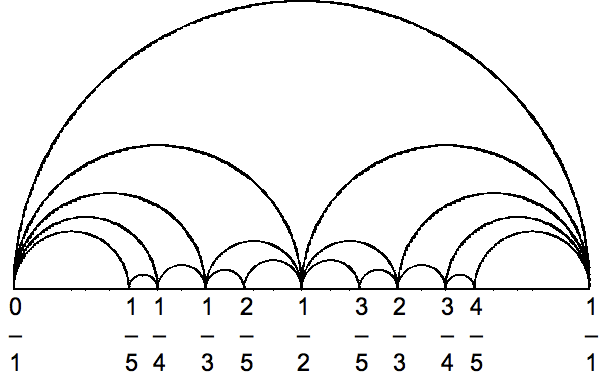
Arc diagram representing the mathematical Farey sequence

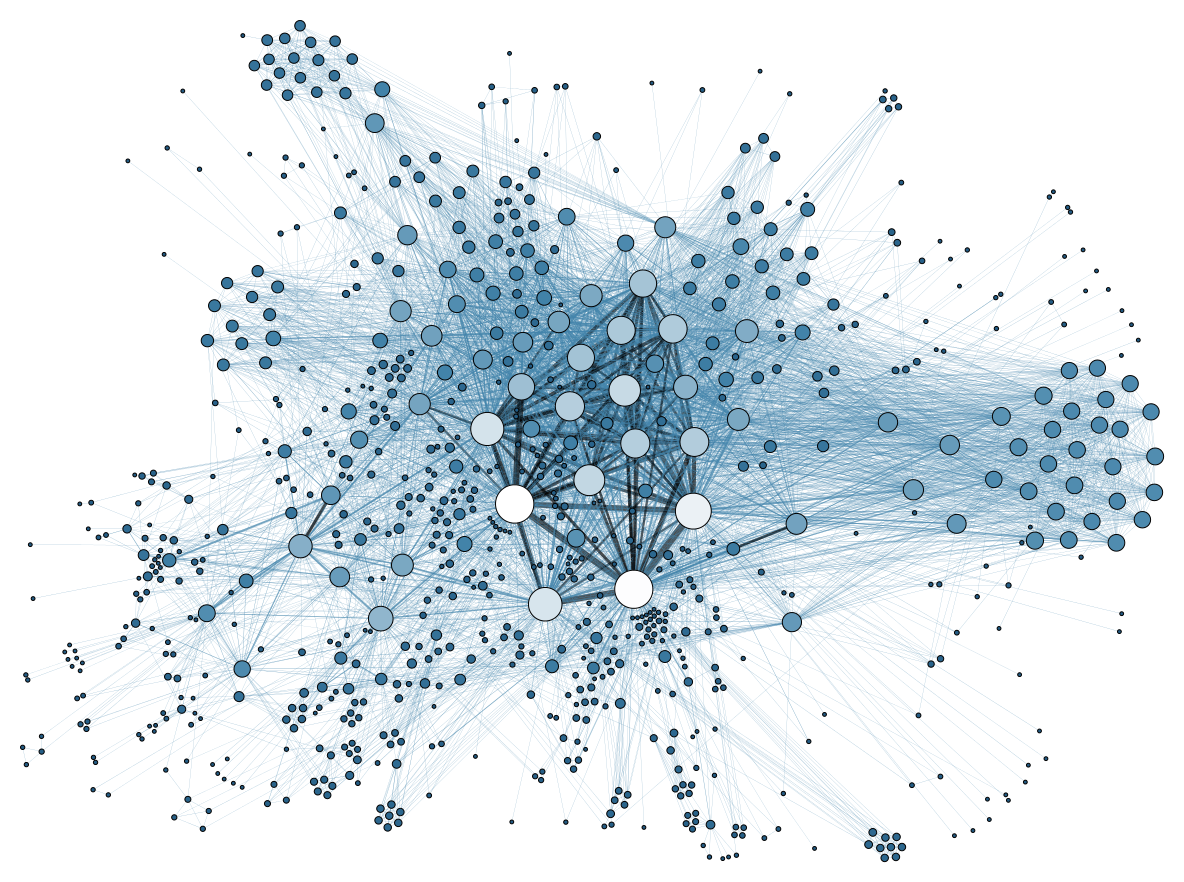
A social network visualization

Network visualization explores relationships, such as friendships and cliques. Three common types are force-directed layout, arc diagrams, and matrix view. Force-directed layouts are a common and intuitive approach to network layout. In this system, nodes are similar to charged particles, which repel each other. Links are used to pull related nodes together. Arc diagrams are one-dimensional layouts of nodes with circular arcs linking each node. When used properly, with good order in nodes, cliques and bridges are easily identified in this layout. Alternatively, mathematicians and computer scientists more often use matrix views. Each value has an (x,y) value in the matrix that corresponds to a node. By using color and saturation instead of text, values associated with the links can be perceived rapidly. While this method makes it hard to view the path of the nodes, there are no line crossings, which in a large and highly connected network can quickly become too cluttered.

While all of these visualizations can be effectively used on their own, many modern infographics combine multiple types into one graphic, along with other features, such as illustrations and text. Some modern infographics do not even contain data visualization, and instead are simply a colorful and succinct ways to present knowledge. Fifty-three percent of the 30 most-viewed infographics on the infographic sharing site visual.ly did not contain actual data.

=== Comparison infographics ===
Comparison infographics are a type of visual representation that focuses on comparing and contrasting different elements, such as products, services, options, or features. These infographics are designed to help viewers make informed decisions by presenting information in a clear and concise manner. Comparison infographics can be highly effective in simplifying complex data and highlighting key differences between multiple items.

== Tools ==
Infographics can be created by hand using simple everyday tools such as graph paper, pencils, markers, and rulers. However, today they are more often created using computer software, which is often both faster and easier. They can be created with general illustration software.

Diagrams can be manually created and drawn using software, which can be downloaded for the desktop or used online. Templates can be used to get users started on their diagrams. Additionally, the software allows users to collaborate on diagrams in real time over the Internet.

There are also numerous tools to create very specific types of visualizations, such as creating a visualization based on embedded data in the photos on a user's smartphone. Users can create an infographic of their resume or a "picture of their digital life."

== See also ==
- A picture is worth a thousand words
- Argument map
- Charts
- Digital dashboard
- Data Presentation Architecture
- Data visualization
- Edugraphic
- Family tree
- Graphic design
- Graphic image development
- Graphic organizers
- Information design
- Isotype (picture language)
- List of information graphics software
- Maestro Concept
- News Illustrated
- Scientific visualization
- Statistical graphics
- Technical illustration
- Timeline
- Visualization (graphic)
