= Robert Delpire =

French art publisher (1926–2017)

Robert Delpire (24 January 1926 – 26 September 2017), also nicknamed "Bob", was an art publisher, editor, curator, film producer and graphic designer who lived and worked in Paris. He predominantly concerned himself with documentary photography, influenced by his interest in anthropology.

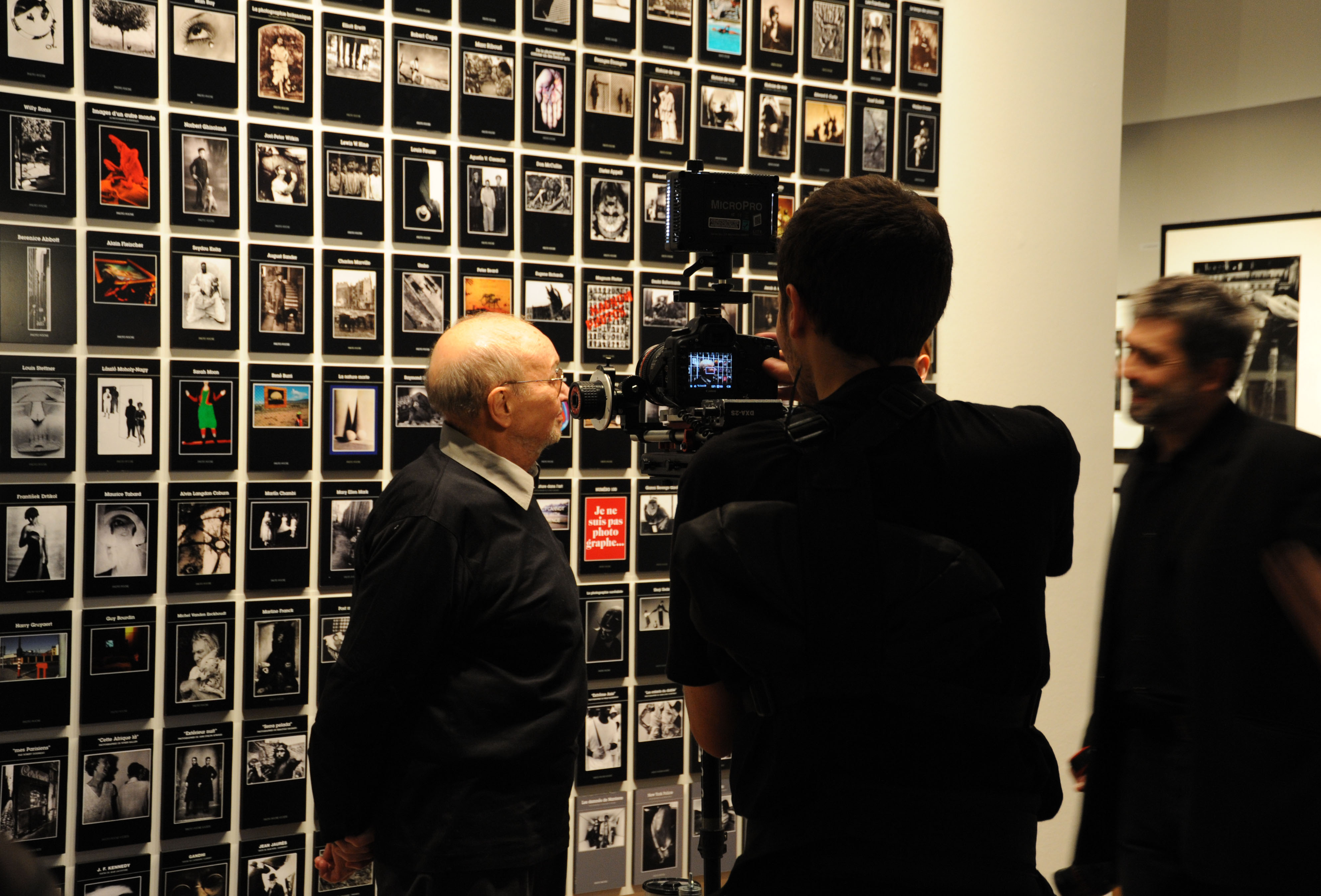
Delpire standing beside a display of Photo Poche books at the retrospective exhibition Delpire & Co. at Maison Européenne de la Photographie, Paris, 2009.

Delpire was editor-in-chief of the cultural review Neuf. He published books of photography, illustration and graphic art through Éditions Delpire and Photo Poche. Photo Poche has been described as "the most successful series of photography monographs ever published", books that "have introduced successive generations to photography". Delpire was the first to publish many notable books of photography including Les Américains (1958, The Americans) by Robert Frank, "perhaps the most influential photography book of the 20th century"; and Les Gitans (1975, Gypsies) by Josef Koudelka, "one of the defining photobooks of the 20th century".

He was director of Centre national de la photographie, and had his own gallery, Galerie Delpire. His company Delpire Productions has produced various films, including Who Are You, Polly Maggoo? (1966, directed by William Klein). He was a key figure in 1960s advertising as a graphic designer with his advertising agency, Delpire Werbung.

Delpire was awarded the International Centre of Photography's (ICP) Infinity Award for Lifetime Achievement and the Royal Photographic Society's Centenary Medal. The Photo Poche collection won the Prix Nadar and ICP's Infinity Award, and Delpire along with Sarah Moon won The Cultural Award from the German Society for Photography (DGPh). Many of the books he edited and published, and films he produced, have also received notable awards.

The retrospective exhibition, Delpire & Co., was shown at Rencontres d'Arles festival, Arles; Maison européenne de la photographie, Paris; then simultaneously across four locations in New York.

== Life and work ==
Delpire was born in Paris, France, on 24 January 1926. As a medical student, Delpire became editor-in-chief of Neuf (Nine), the Maison de la Médecine's cultural review for its doctors. Neuf devoted much of its content to photography by Brassaï, Henri Cartier-Bresson, Robert Doisneau, Izis, Willy Ronis and Robert Frank. There were nine irregular issues from 1950 to 1953.

Delpire published three photography books under the short-lived imprint Huit (Eight): Doisneau's Les Parisiens tels qu'ils sont (Parisians as They Are, 1954); Cartier-Bresson's Les Danses à Bali (Dances in Bali, 1954), the first of a long collaboration between Delpire and his friend Cartier-Bresson; and George Rodger's Le Village des Noubas (The Village of the Nubas, 1955).

In the mid-1950s in Paris he founded and ran the publisher Delpire & Co., which has continued to produce books under the name Éditions Delpire by photographers such as Cartier-Bresson, Lartigue, Brassaï, Doisneau, Frank and many others. Delpire & Co. published a series of books on culture called Encyclopédie Essentielle. In 1957 the fifth work in Encyclopédie Essentielle was the first publication of Robert Frank's Les Américains (The Americans). The Americans was "One of Delpire's pivotal contributions to photography": it "changed the nature of photography, what it could say and how it could say it. [ . . . ] it remains perhaps the most influential photography book of the 20th century". Delpire's edition, unlike later English-language editions, included texts by Simone de Beauvoir, Erskine Caldwell, William Faulkner, Henry Miller and John Steinbeck that Delpire positioned opposite Frank's photographs. The Encyclopédie Essentielle series also included Les Allemands (The Germans, 1963) by René Burri.

Delpire & Co. also published children's books with its Dix sur Dix (Ten Out of Ten) series, employing illustrators such as André François and Alain Le Foll. Its first was the début publication in book form of Crocodile Tears (1955) by André François, having already published it in Neuf No. 9 in 1953. Delpire & Co. was the first French publisher of Maurice Sendak's Where the Wild Things Are (Max et les Maximonstres, 1967).

In 1955 Delpire created the brand identity for L'ŒIL magazine and was its artistic director for eight years.

Delpire ran an advertising agency, Delpire Publicité / Delpire Werbung (Delpire Advertising), with clients that included Citroën and L'Oréal. For a decade from around the mid 1950s, Delpire, in partnership with Claude Puech, produced sales brochures and posters for Citroën, using the work of photographers (Helmut Newton, Sarah Moon, and others), illustrators, painters and typographers. Delpire Werbung also produced TV adverts for Citroën. (Note: There are examples of Delpire Werbung adverts for Citroën here on YouTube.)

Delpire opened Galerie Delpire in Saint-Germain-des-Prés, Paris, in 1963; this exhibited photographs and books published by Delpire & Co.

Through his film production company, Delpire Productions, Delpire produced various films, notably some by the photographer and filmmaker William Klein, including Qui êtes vous, Polly Maggoo? (Who Are You, Polly Maggoo?).

Delpire set up a creative studio and publishing house called Idéodis.

In 1982 he was appointed by the French arts minister Jack Lang to be director of the Centre national de la photographie (National Center of Photography, now Galerie nationale du Jeu de Paume). Whilst director until 1996 he organised exhibitions and created a collection of small, numerically sequenced softcover pocket-sized books titled Photo Poche, of which there are hundreds on photographers and photographic themes. (They are now [2015] instead published by Actes Sud.) Liz Jobey in the Financial Times described them as "the most successful series of photography monographs ever published", books that "have introduced successive generations to photography".

He was the director of the Fondation Henri Cartier-Bresson, and at the time of his death served on its advisory board.

Delpire was married to the photographer Sarah Moon.

He died on 26 September 2017 in Paris at the age of 91.

== Publications ==
=== Notable publications first published by Delpire ===
- Les Américains (1958; The Americans) by Robert Frank.
- Les Gitans: La Fin du Voyage (1975; Gypsies) by Josef Koudelka.
- Exils (1988; Exiles) by Josef Koudelka.
- D'une Chine à l'autre (1954; From One China to the Other = China in Transition: A Moment in History). By Henri Cartier-Bresson.
- Moscou(1955; The People of Moscow). By Henri Cartier-Bresson.
- Guerre à la tristesse (1955; Fiesta in Pamplona). By Inge Morath.
- De la Perse à l'Iran (1958; From Persia to Iran). By Inge Morath.
- Tokyo (1964) by William Klein.
- Indiens pas morts (1956; "Indians not dead"). By Werner Bischof, Robert Frank and Pierre Verger.
- Les Larmes de crocodile (1955; Crocodile Tears). Written and illustrated by André François.

=== Notable publications published by Delpire, first published elsewhere ===
- Max et les Maximonstres = Where the Wild Things Are. Paris: Delpire, 1967. By Maurice Sendak. First French edition.

=== Publications about Delpire ===
- Delpire & Cie. Coffret 3 vols. Paris: Delpire, 2009. ISBN 9782851072504. Published on the occasion of the exhibition Delpire & Cie.

== Films ==
=== Produced by Delpire ===
- Cassius le Grand = Cassius the Great (1964) – short, directed by William Klein.
- Qui êtes-vous, Polly Maggoo? = Who Are You, Polly Maggoo? (1966) – directed by William Klein.
- Flagrants Délits – 38 minute film on Cartier-Bresson.
- Corps Profond (1960) – 17 minute short directed by Igor Barrère and Étienne Lalou.
- Muhammad Ali: The Greatest (1969) – directed by William Klein.

=== Directed by Delpire ===
- Contacts (1989–2004) – Delpire directed a 14-minute episode apiece on Koudelka and Cartier-Bresson of the documentary series.

=== About or with an appearance by Delpire ===
- Bibliothèque de Poche (1967) – Delpire appears in one episode of the series that ran from 1966–1968.
- Henri Cartier-Bresson: The Impassioned Eye (2003) – 72 minute documentary directed by Heinz Butler with Delpire and others.
- Le Montreur d'Images: Robert Delpire (2009) – 52 minute documentary about Delpire by Sarah Moon with Delpire and Érik Orsenna.

=== With contributions by Delpire ===
- The King of Ads (1993) – A collection of European TV commercials, including one by Delpire for a Citroën Furgoneta.

== Exhibitions ==
=== Exhibitions related to Delpire's work ===
- Delpire & Cie = Delpire & Co., Rencontres d'Arles, Arles, France, 7 July – 13 September 2009. Maison européenne de la photographie, Paris, 28 October 2009 – 24 January 2010. Simultaneously across Aperture Gallery, New York, 10 May – 19 July 2012; The Gallery at Hermès, Hermès, New York, 11 May – 19 July 2012; Cultural Services of the French Embassy in the United States, Payne Whitney House, New York, 11 May – 8 June 2012; and La Maison Française (New York University), New York, 21 May – 19 July 2012. A retrospective.
- A Tribute to Robert Delpire Through the Work of Robert Frank, Lee Friedlander, Josef Koudelka, Duane Michals and Paolo Roversi, 10 May – 16 June 2012, Pace/MacGill Gallery, New York, NY.

=== Exhibitions curated by Delpire ===
- Citroën, graphic arts and publicity, Musée des Arts Décoratifs, Paris / Les Arts Décoratifs(?), 1965.
- De qui s'agit-il?, Bibliothèque nationale de France, 30 April – 27 July 2003. Photographs by Cartier-Bresson.
- Demain/Hier = Tomorrow/Yesterday, Magnum Gallery, Saint-Germain-des-Prés, Paris, 20 November 2009 – 30 January 2010. Photographs by Alec Soth, Trent Parke, Mark Power, Jim Goldberg, Alessandra Sanguinetti, Paolo Pellegrin, Thomas Dworzak, Cristina García Rodero, Larry Towell and Carl de Keyzer.

== Awards ==
=== Awards for Delpire ===
- 1995: Centenary Medal from the Royal Photographic Society, Bath.
- 1997: Infinity Award: Lifetime Achievement award for Delpire from the International Centre of Photography.
- 2007: The Cultural Award from the German Society for Photography (DGPh), with Sarah Moon

=== Awards for books published by Delpire ===
- 1955: Japon = Japan (1954) by Werner Bischof won the Prix Nadar.
- 1960: Afrique by Emil Schulthess won the Prix Nadar.
- 1978: Gitans la Fin du Voyage = Gypsies by Josef Koudelka won the Prix Nadar.
- 1984: Photo Poche collection from Centre National de la Photographie won the Prix Nadar.
- 1985: Infinity Award: Publication award for fr:Photo Poche from the International Centre of Photography.
- 1999: End Time City by Michael Ackerman won the Prix Nadar.
- 2008: 1 2 3 4 5 by Sarah Moon won the Prix Nadar.

=== Awards for films produced by Delpire ===
- Cassius le Grand won Grand Prix du Festival de Tours.
- 1967: Who Are You, Polly Magoo? won the Prix Jean Vigo.
