= Festival panafricain d'Alger 1969 =

1969 Algerian documentary film

Festival panafricain d’Alger 1969
- Directed by: William Klein
- Screenplay by: William Klein
- Produced by: ONCIC (Office national pour le commerce et l’industrie cinématographiques)
- Cinematography: Pierre Lhomme; William Klein
- Edited by: Jacqueline Meppiel; Jean Ravel
- Release date: 1969
- Running time: 112 minutes
- Countries: Algeria; France; Germany

Festival panafricain d’Alger 1969 is a 1969 Algerian documentary film about the Pan-African Festival of Algiers of 1969, also known as PANAF. The film was directed by William Klein, who was commissioned by the Algerian government to direct a film capturing the 12-day event. The film features footage from the festival in combination with a variety of other visual materials, and performances from Miriam Makeba and Nina Simone are included alongside political speeches and interviews with postcolonial and liberationist political figures.

== Background ==
Following its independence from France in 1962, Algeria developed a status as a space for liberation movements and postcolonial thought, and the ruling FLN party had links to a multitude of such groups across the continent. The Pan-African Cultural Festival was held as a celebration of African identity and culture, and a chance to unite and promote interaction between liberation movements, as well as an opportunity for the Algerian government to promote the newly independent country as a leader on the continent. Every African country sent a delegation of musicians, writers, artists, and intellectuals who joined members of the African diaspora as well as a contingent of African-American activists, musicians, and writers, including Nina Simone and Maya Angelou, and a delegation from the Black Panther Party, led by Stokely Carmichael and Eldridge Cleaver, who had recently fled an arrest warrant in the United States. Over five-thousand people travelled to Algeria for the festival in what has been referred to as “an unprecedented—and since unrivalled—moment of anti-imperialist unity”. Amílcar Cabral, a Bissau-Guinean and Cape Verdean activist and key postcolonial thinker, remarked in a press conference that “Christians make pilgrimages to the Vatican, Muslims go to Mecca, and national liberation movements go to Algeria”. The festival began with an opening day parade, in which four thousand participants from all the represented nations and groups marched through Algiers, interacting with locals and performing regional dance and music. The festival period saw a variety of different events encompassing dance, music, drama, sculpture, and painting, and events were hosted both in national theatres and halls and on the street. Notable performances over the 12-day event included concerts by Miriam Makeba and Nina Simone, as well as a much-lauded improvisatory jazz collaboration between Archie Shepp and Southern Algerian Tuareg musicians.

== Synopsis ==
In Festival panafricain d’Alger 1969, William Klein documents a variety of the festival's concerts, exhibitions, street marches, and performances, as well as the preparations and rehearsals for the festival. He blends images of interviews made with writers and advocates of the freedom movements with stock images, thus allowing him to touch on such matters as colonialism, neocolonialism, colonial exploitation, the struggles and battles of the revolutionary movements for independence, and African culture. Recorded in the film are the dozens of notable artists, musicians, activists, and political figures, as well as performances from Miriam Makeba, Nina Simone, and Archie Shepp.

== Production ==
=== Style ===
The film does not follow a clear narrative arc nor does it feature any lengthy voiceover. Instead, a “huge quantity and range of rich visual materials” are used, including posters, drawings, archive footage, and photographs, as well as a wealth of footage taken during the festival, including interviews, concert footage, and speeches. Olivier Hadouchi praised the film for its synthesis of stylistic choices characteristic of “a little-known history of cinema associated with the liberation of Africa”, and notes that the combination of the wide variety of visual aids and Klein's use of direct cinema results in a “highly dynamic” product. Additionally, the film's aesthetic approach has been described as “ tied to the political cinema from the late sixties”. The film is divided into four chapters: ‘First Pan-African Cultural Festival’, ‘Preparations’, ‘Liberation movements in Algiers’ and ‘4’. The final section is only numbered and not titled, implying “an open-ended process”.

=== Appointment of William Klein ===
The film was commissioned by the Algerian government, and as such the purpose of the film was in large part to promote Algeria's position as a leader within the Non-Aligned Movement, the 'Third World', and amongst socialist liberationist powers. Mohammed Seddik Benyahia, the Algerian minister of information, and his chief of staff, Mahieddine Moussaoui, were the key figures overseeing production of the film. According to Ahmed Bedjaoui, original plans had been to entrust the direction of the film to a collective of 10 directors, many of whom would have been of Algerian or African descent, but Benyahia was convinced by Klein to grant him full directorial power, angering proponents of Algerian cinema. However, Elaine Mokhteifi, who worked as an organiser for the festival, claims that discussions over who was to direct only ever concerned two candidates, Klein and Palme d’Or winner Marcel Camus, and that Klein's previous feature on Muhammad Ali had made him the preferred choice. It has also been argued that the Algerian government had hoped Klein's appointment would allow the film to gain popularity and prestige with European audiences. The Senegalese film director Ousmane Sembène was among critics of Klein's appointment, and argued it did not fit with the sentiment of the festival for a white American to have “the right to film the festival”; indeed, some were perplexed by the hiring of a white film crew to document such a fiercely Pan-Africanist, postcolonial event. Klein filmed two films while in Algeria, the second being Elridge Cleaver, Black Panther. While some have praised Klein's work, arguing that "few filmmakers could have captured and immortalised this tumultuous period with such strength and talent", Mokhtefi stated in her 2018 memoir Algiers, Third World Capital that the project was "beyond Klein's organisational skills... an indigestible flop".

== Release ==
The film failed to generate much publicity upon its release, and in fact was "hardly distributed at all in Africa or in the Third World"; in Algeria, it was "shelved away". The film was selected for a screening at the 1971 Cannes Film Festival, and entered the art-house cinema circuit in France as a result, to little fanfare. The decision to employ Klein with hopes of reaching a European audience largely did not pay off; the Algerian cinema community largely rejected the film, while the film's one-hundred percent Algerian-based production made it harder to circulate. Furthermore, Klein himself did not promote the film at all, according to cinema historian Olivier Hadouchi. In 2009, a new edition of the film was screened in Algeria as part of a 50th Anniversary edition of the Pan-African Cultural Festival in collaboration with European TV Channel ARTE, who restored and distributed both of Klein's 1969 Algerian films.
