= Simon Neal =

Simon Neal may refer to:

- Simon Neal (cricketer)
- Simon Neal (baritone)

== See also ==
- Simon Neale, artist, producer and DJ
