= The Model Couple =

1977 satirical film by William Klein

- Le Couple témoin
- Directed by: William Klein
- Written by: William Klein
- Produced by: Roger Fleytoux
- Starring: André Dussolier; Anémone; Zouc; Jacques Boudet
- Cinematography: Philippe Rousselot; William Klein
- Edited by: Valérie Mayoux
- Music by: Michel Colombier; Hugues Aufray
- Distributed by: NPF Planfilm
- Release date: 1977
- Running time: 101 min
- Countries: France; Switzerland
- Language: French

The Model Couple (French: Le Couple témoin) is a 1977 French and Swiss film by William Klein. It is a satire of consumerism and modernity, and follows the events of a national experiment where a "model couple" representing the typical French pair is subjected to constant surveillance as they undergo experiences both mundane and absurd.

== Themes ==
Originally intended as a piece of a larger production, The Model Couple is a satire that is critical of mass media, technology and government surveillance, and investigates the ways in which liberal societies can become oppressively totalitarian. Despite these heavy themes, the film's tone is largely slapstick, interspersed with psychedelic sequences.

== Plot ==
In 1970s France, Jean-Michel (André Dussollier) and Claudine (Anémone) are chosen by the Ministry of the Future to be the "model couple", a heterosexual pair to be used as test subjects in order to create "a new city for the new man" in the year 2000. Immediately upon their arrival at the test facility, Jean-Michel and Claudine are subjected to constant surveillance and monitoring by a pair of unfriendly sociologists (Zouc and Jacques Boudet) who constantly rate and evaluate the couple. The couple are asked to evaluate various state-of-the-art consumer products and to go through their daily routines in increasingly alienating and Kafkaesque circumstances.

As the experiment proceeds, the media speculates endlessly about its progress on talk shows and in news reporting, and the couple becomes increasingly irritated with the sociologists, the experiment, and each other. The sociologists' true motives become unclear, as they simultaneously mislead the couple as to the purpose of the experiment while themselves expressing contempt for the experiment's supposed intent and proceedings. The experiment enters a new phase, titled "denormalization". The couple are visited by guests, including a government minister and the American psychologist Dr. Goldberg, who humiliates Jean-Michel by testing his submissiveness to authority.

Later, a group of teenage terrorists (who are likely also employed by the Ministry of the Future, although this is left ambiguous) invades the experiment chamber wielding fake weapons. The terrorists propose that the couple play along with them and rebel against the experiment, unplugging all of the surveillance equipment and covering the walls with graffiti. A hostage team is sent to negotiate with the terrorists while the news media speculates wildly as to their motives and the consequences for the experiment. The terrorists demand airtime on television in exchange for the release of the couple, and film a short video together with Jean-Michel and Claudine. At the end of the film, Jean-Michel and Claudine are evicted from the experiment without an explanation as the terrorists and sociologists walk away.

== Production ==
The film was written and directed by William Klein, edited by Valerie Mayoux, and has music by Michel Colombier and Hugues Aufray. William Klein and Philippe Rousselot are credited for cinematography.

== Cast ==
- André Dussollier: Jean-Michel
- Anémone: Claudine
- Zouc: Psycho-sociologist no. 1
- Jacques Boudet: Psycho-sociologist no. 2
- Eddie Constantine: Doctor Goldberg
- Georges Descrières: Minister of the Future
- André Penvern: TV commentator

== Reception and legacy ==
In a review for the Criterion Collection, Michael Koresky describes the film as "soberingly prescient" and "remarkably fresh...a social satire [that] carries a timeless sting". A review in Télérama wrote that the film's improvised tone was both charming and a limitation which underscored director William Klein's penchant for documentaries over fiction, concluding that The Model Couple is overall quite funny and that Zouc's performance as an antisocial psychosociologist alone makes the film worth watching.

The film is included in a Criterion Collection box set of William Klein's films.
