= Nicole Heaston =

American soprano

Nicole Heaston is an American soprano.

She was raised in the Hyde Park neighborhood of Chicago, and grew up listening to Stevie Wonder, Earth, Wind & Fire, and Gladys Knight, as well as choral and classical music in church. She attended Kenwood Academy, where her choir teacher Lena McLin encouraged her to pursue opera, pointing to William Warfield, Leontyne Price, and Shirley Verrett as earlier examples of Black opera singers. Heaston studied music at the University of Akron and the Cincinnati Conservatory of Music. Subsequently, she started an apprenticeship with the Houston Grand Opera, and debuted in a production of Romeo and Juliet.

Heaston collaborated with conductor Marc Minkowski, including in a 1999 film version of Händel's Messiah directed by William Klein. She debuted at the Metropolitan Opera as Zerlina in Don Giovanni. She has also sung for the Norwegian National Opera, and the Houston Grand Opera. She has sung the role of the Countess in the Marriage of Figaro in the Boston Lyric Opera and the San Francisco Opera.

She sang the lead role in The Listeners in its world premiere with the Norwegian National Opera in 2022, and in its Chicago premiere at the Lyric Opera in 2025.
