= The Listeners (opera) =

2022 opera by Missy Mazzoli

- Opera by Missy Mazzoli
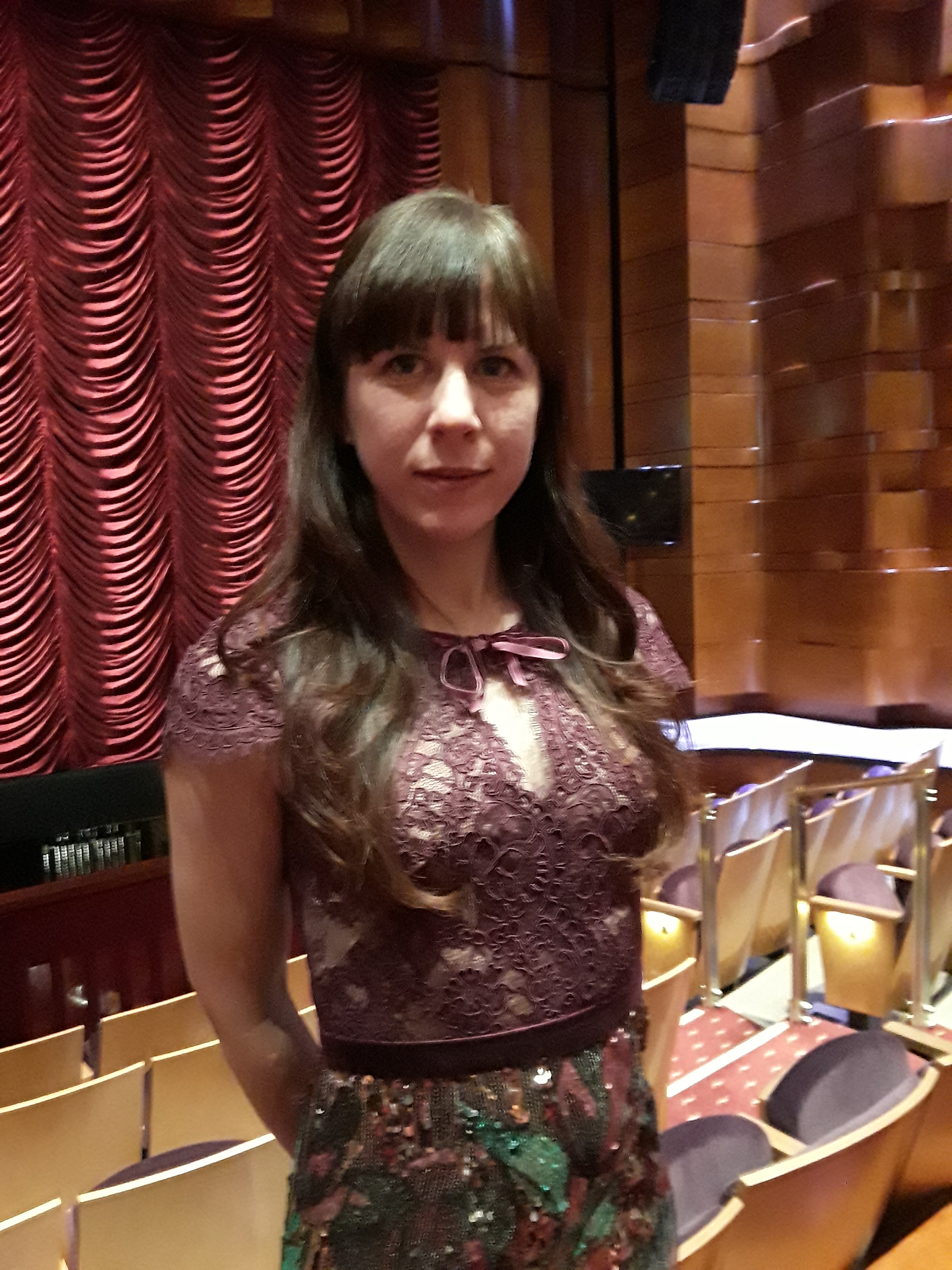
- Missy Mazzoli in 2018
- Librettist: Royce Vavrek
- Language: English
- Premiere: 24 September 2022; Oslo Opera House

The Listeners is an English-language opera in two acts, with music by American composer Missy Mazzoli and libretto by Royce Vavrek. Based on a story by Jordan Tannahill, the opera was commissioned by Opera Philadelphia and Lyric Opera of Chicago. The premiere was staged with Norwegian National Opera in 2022, before the American premiere in Philadelphia in 2024.

== Background and performance history ==
Vavrek's libretto is based on a story by Canadian writer Jordan Tannahill. The hum, which is the main driver of the plot, is a phenomenon in which a person or group of people hear a mysterious humming noise which others cannot hear. This phenomenon has occurred in several places around the world.

The premiere was staged in 2022 at the Oslo Opera House with the Norwegian National Opera. The premiere was co-produced by Opera Philadelphia and the Lyric Opera of Chicago, with Nicole Heaston in the lead role. The production was performed in 2024 in Philadelphia at the Academy of Music, and in 2025 at the Lyric Opera of Chicago, with Heaston once more in the lead role as Claire.

There was a 2025 production by the Aalto Musiktheater in Essen, directed by Anna-Sophie Mahler. The lead role was sung by Betsy Horne.

== Roles ==
Roles, voice types, premiere cast
Role	Voice type	Premiere cast – September 24, 2022 Conductor: Ilan Volkov
Claire Devon	soprano	Nicole Heaston
Howard Bard	baritone	Simon Neal
Angela	mezzo-soprano	Tone Kummervold
Kyle Harris	tenor	Eirik Grøtvedt
Dillon	baritone	Johannes Weisser
Ashley Devon	soprano	Frøy Hovland Holtbakk
Paul Devon	bass-baritone	Håvard Stensvold
Thom	bass-baritone	Martin Hatlo

== Synopsis ==
Claire Devon, a teacher living in a Southwestern suburb of the United States, is suddenly disturbed by a persistent humming sound that her family cannot hear. The mental anguish this causes results in the unravelling of both her career and marriage. Initially, she believes that only she suffers from the sound, until one of her students, Kyle, reveals that he too can hear the hum. Together, they discover the existence of a group of fellow sufferers. Joining the group, led by the charismatic Howard Bard, Claire finds that its members have various theories as to the origin of the noise. The group exhibits cult-like behaviours, and Howard begins to exercise a certain psychosexual power over Claire. After a showdown with Howard, a renegade member leaves the group and fires a gun at a cell tower he believes to be the hum's source, attracting police attention. A police raid on Howard's house results in the death of several members, including Kyle. After Howard is driven out by other members, Claire assumes leadership over the group.

== Reception ==
=== Oslo 2022 premiere ===
In a review for NRK Eystein Sandvik wrote that The Listeners was Mazzoli's most ambitious work to date, which he felt placed her at the forefront of American composers since John Adams. Sandvik felt that the portrayal of the cult was credible, and that Mazzoli's music created a suitably dark atmosphere. However, Sandvik felt that the second act was weaker than the first, with the action becoming somewhat predictable. He also felt that the downfall of the cult was not quite as powerful as it was intended to be. On the singers, Sandvik opined that Heaston showed adaptability in the lead role, with a warm lyrical soprano. He praised baritone Johannes Weisser as Dillon, calling it a demanding role. Eirik Grøtvedt and Frøy Hovland Holtbakk were highlighted as stand out performers as Kyle and Ashley. The Norwegian National Opera Orchestra's performance under Ilan Volkov played fabulously, according to Sandvik. Finally, he mentioned that Mazolli's creative use of the orchestra was her greatest strength as a composer.

In Aftenposten, Aksel Dalmo Tollåli gave a positive review of the premiere performance of The Listeners, saying that even if audience members saw only one opera that year, it ought to be The Listeners.

==== Philadelphia 2024 performance ====
Reviewing of the Philadelphia production in The New Yorker, Alex Ross described The Listeners as "mesmerizing", and called Mazzoli "a once-in-a-generation magician of the orchestra." Ross singled out the staging and orchestra, and called Nicole Heaston "pristine" in the lead role. Ross described The Listeners as "an opera about music itself", and of its central sonic conceit, he wrote "what gives the opera peculiar potency is the way Mazzoli embeds the hum in her score, letting it represent something bigger and more pervasive than a chat-room delusion... (this) sonic shadow suggests the way sounds can alter our being and bind us into groups, for good or for ill."

Writing for Bachtrack in a four-star review, Cameron Keshall noted that the Academy of Music was "packed to the gills" for a weekday evening performance. Keshall called the cast "strong" other than Kevin Burdette whom Keshall thought was "more comedic than captivating" in his role as the apparent cult leader Howard Bard. Keshall felt that Adam Riggs scenic design "suggested a darker world...beneath manicured surfaces", but that the dancing could have been cut. Keshall was hopeful than the young audience members would be drawn back to attending further operas, "If the company continues to produce works as daring and satisfying as this".

The Washington Classical Review was less positive, with Alex Baker criticising the treatment of the subject matter, writing "The Listeners feels more like the take on a cult you’d get in a mid-90s Saturday Night Live sketch." He found the first ten minutes "promising" followed by scenes with Vavrek's "beautiful poetry" in the libretto. However, Baker indicated a decline in quality as the cult was introduced, calling many of the plot points "generic" and stating that the libretto contained "filler" in Act II.

Zachary Woolfe in the New York Times named the production one of the Best Classical Performances of 2024, calling it "the unmissable opera of the season," and "a clear yet layered, rivetingly theatrical tale about eco-anxiety, mysticism and cult dynamics that barrels toward an ending equal parts satisfying and scary."

==== Chicago 2025 performance ====
The critical response to The Listeners 2025 production at Chicago Lyric was sharply divided. The opera was derided as a "crass and muddled mess" by Chicago Classical Review, while in a more mixed review, Chris Jones in The Chicago Tribune called it "creepy and weird", and asked "So is the Hum nihilistic? Seductive? Soporific? Dangerous? Or a kind of unifying bass note? Does it represent dissonance and discord, or does it offer a communal possibility? Mazzoli’s music explores all of those questions."

In a rave review in the Chicago Sun-Times, Kyle MacMillan wrote that The Listeners "delivers an eerie thriller that captivates from first note to last" and "definitively establishes (Mazzoli) as one of the major composers of our time." MacMillan described the opera as "raw and riveting, discomfiting and relentlessly contemporary" and as "a tale of loneliness, a desperate need to belong and the ugly lure of power."

=== Essen 2025 production ===
The Essen production of The Listeners, directed by Anne-Sophie Mahler for the Aalto Musiktheater, was met with critical acclaim. Juan Carlos Tellechea called it "a resounding success" in Mondo Classical, writing, "Mazzoli not only writes enchanting choral music, which often builds in clusters and then oscillates into slow rhythms; the orchestral music, heavy on percussion and electronics, is also mesmerizing." Michael Kaminski, writing in Concerti, described the opera as "gripping... musically phenomenal and scenically suggestive."
