= Les Musiciens du Louvre =

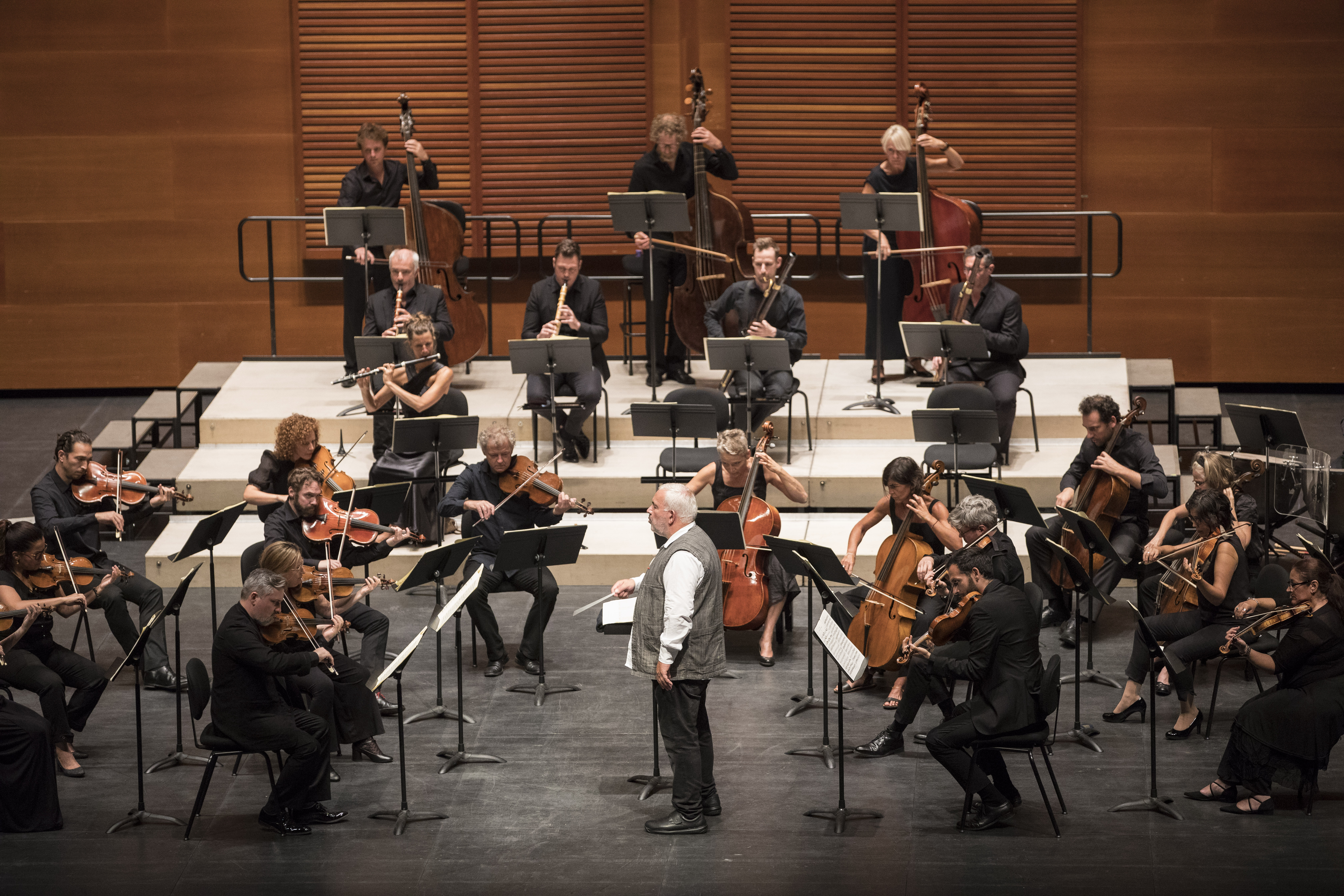
Les Musiciens du Louvre perform at the 2020 Quincena Musical de San Sebastián

Les Musiciens du Louvre (literally The Musicians of the Louvre) is a French period instrument ensemble, formed in 1982. Originally based in Paris, since 1996 it has been based in the Couvent des Minimes in Grenoble. The Guardian considers it one of the best orchestras in the world.

== History ==
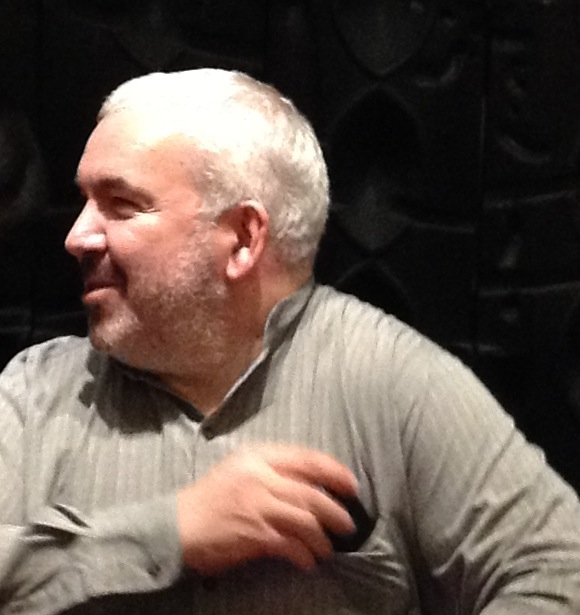
Marc Minkowski in 2013

Founded by Marc Minkowski in 1982, the ensemble was originally based in Paris. From 1987 it gained an international reputation as one of the best Baroque and classical ensembles. It has also made successful forays into the works of Offenbach, Berlioz and Bizet. In 1992, it inaugurated the Baroque music festival at the Palace of Versailles with Armide by Gluck, then in 1993 took part in the inauguration of the Opéra Nouvel in Lyon with Phaëton by Lully. 1993 also saw it win a Gramophone Award for Best Baroque Vocal Recording for its recording of San Giovanni Battista by Stradella. On its move to Grenoble in 1996 it merged with the Ensemble instrumental de Grenoble.

In 1999, the ensemble collaborated with photographer William Klein on Messiah, a film performance of Handel's celebrated oratorio with accompanying photographs and filmed images shot or assembled by director.

In 2004, on the reopening of the Maison de la Culture de Grenoble (renamed MC2) Les Musiciens du Louvre set up an 'atelier de création'. In 2005, they were the first French ensemble invited to play at the Salzburg Festival (Mitridate, re di Ponto, reprised in the Mozart complete works festival in 2006).

In 2005, Marc Minkowski decided to set up the Atelier des musiciens du Louvre, a workshop aiming to increase partnership with regional artists and cultural figures and to increase public access to the orchestra's concerts via teaching and education projects, especially to the young.

== Activities ==
Les Musiciens du Louvre-Grenoble supports the renewal of Baroque music in France and more generally the use of period instruments and period style. The projet des Musiciens du Louvre-Grenoble proposes a progressive and lyrical re-evaluation, from baroque music to modern music, and programming certain works which have been neglected for unjustifiable or obscure reasons. This project makes the ensemble one of the most evolved, inventive and original music groups in the world.

External videos
- Danse des Sauvages from Les Indes galantes by Jean-Philippe Rameau on YouTube

It is also well known for its rediscovery of works by Handel (its contribution to the Handelian repertoire is recognised as one of the most important in the world), Henry Purcell and Jean-Philippe Rameau, as well as by Haydn and Mozart, to mention the most important. This path has naturally led to later and later repertoire, favouring 19th century French music. It has participated in projects around Berlioz (Symphonie Fantastique, Nuit d'été, Harold en Italie) and Jacques Offenbach in particular (La Belle Hélène, La Grande Duchesse de Gérolstein), but also around Georges Bizet (Carmen and the music from L'Arlésienne) and Gabriel Fauré (Musique de Théâtre). The 2008–2009 season also saw even later composers such as Wagner, Pyotr Ilyich Tchaikovsky and Stravinski.

Opera quickly took a major role in the orchestra's repertoire right from its foundation – they have won critical acclaim for their productions of Monteverdi ( The Coronation of Poppaea in 2000 at the Festival d'Aix-en-Provence), Gluck (Armide in 1992), Mozart (The Magic Flute at the Ruhr Triennale, The Abduction from the Seraglio at the Festival d'Aix-en-Provence, Mitridate in 2005 for their first Salzburg Festival appearance) but above all their productions of Iphigénie en Tauride by Gluck at the Opéra de Paris, Carmen by Bizet (May 2007), Die Feen by Wagner (March 2009) at the Théâtre du Châtelet and The Marriage of Figaro by Mozart at the Théâtre des Champs Elysées. It has also toured in Eastern Europe, Asia, North America, South America and (in 2009) to Japan.

== Discography ==
- Handel: Alcina (2024, PENTATONE)
- Lully (Phaëton, Acis & Galatée, les Comédies-Ballets)
- Charpentier (Le Malade imaginaire, Te Deum)
- Marais (Alcione)
- Blamont (Didon)
- Clérambault (Le Soleil vainqueur des Nuages)
- Mouret (Les Amours de Ragonde)
- Stuck (Héraclite & Démocrite)
- Rebel (Les Élémens)
- Rameau (Hippolyte & Aricie, Platée, Dardanus, Les surprises de l'Amour [suites], Anacréon, Le Berger fidèle, Une symphonie imaginaire)
- Mondonville (Titon & l'Aurore, Sonates en symphonies)
- Gluck (Armide, Iphigénie en Tauride, Orphée et Eurydice)
- Méhul (Symphonies n° 1 and 2)
- Berlioz (Symphonie fantastique and Herminie with the Mahler Chamber Orchestra and Aurélia Legay)
- Offenbach (La Belle Hélène, La Grande-Duchesse de Gérolstein, Concerto for cello and other instruments, gala with Anne Sofie von Otter, Orphée aux Enfers, A Concert of Music by Offenbach)
- Handel (Il trionfo del Tempo e del Disinganno, La resurrezione, Messiah, Hercules, Amadigi, Teseo, Ariodante, Giulio Cesare, Concerti Grossi opus 3, Dixit Dominus et motets romains, Delirio amoroso and cantatas with Magdalena Kožená, French cantatas, Haendel Scarlatti Caldara Opera Proibita with Cécilia Bartoli)
- Mozart (Mitridate [DVD], Die Entführung aus dem Serail [DVD], Don Giovanni [arrangement for wind octet by Triebensee], Jupiter, Mass in C Minor)
- Monteverdi (L'incoronazione di Poppea [DVD])
- Stradella (San Giovanni Battista)
- Rossini (L'inganno felice [under the name Concert des Tuileries])
- Bizet (L'Arlésienne)
- Bach (Messe en Si)
- Schubert Complete Symphonies (Minkowski, Naïve)
