= Sarah Moon =

French photographer

- Born: Marielle Warin; 1941 (age 84–85); Vernon, Eure, France
- Occupation: Photographer
- Known for: model turned photographer
- Awards: Honorary Fellowship of the Royal Photographic Society

Sarah Moon HonFRPS (born Marielle Warin; 1941) is a French photographer. Initially a model, she turned to fashion photography in the 1970s. Since 1985, she has concentrated on gallery and film work.

== Biography ==
Marielle Warin was born in Vernon, France in 1941. Her Jewish family was forced to leave occupied France for England. As a teenager she studied drawing before working as a model in London and Paris (1960–1966) under the name Marielle Hadengue. She also became interested in photography, taking shots of her model colleagues. In 1970, she finally decided to spend all her time on photography rather than modelling, adopting Sarah Moon as her new name. She successfully captured the fashionable atmosphere of London after the "swinging sixties", working closely with Barbara Hulanicki, who had launched the popular clothes store Biba.

In 1972, she shot the Pirelli calendar, the first woman to do so. After working for a long time with Cacharel, her reputation grew and she also received commissions from Chanel, Dior, Comme des Garçons and Vogue. Since 1985, Moon has moved into gallery work and even started developing her own films including Circuss (2002) and Le Fil Rouge (2006). She later directed the music video for Khaled's pop hit Aïcha.

== Publications ==
- Improbable Memories. Matrix, 1981. ISBN 978-0-936554-31-0.
- Vrais Semblants = Real Appearances. Parco, 1991. ISBN 9784891942892.
- Coïncidences. Santa Fe, NM: Arena, 2001. ISBN 978-1-892041-46-3.
- Sarah Moon 1,2,3,4,5. London: Thames & Hudson, 2008. ISBN 978-0500287835.

== Exhibitions ==
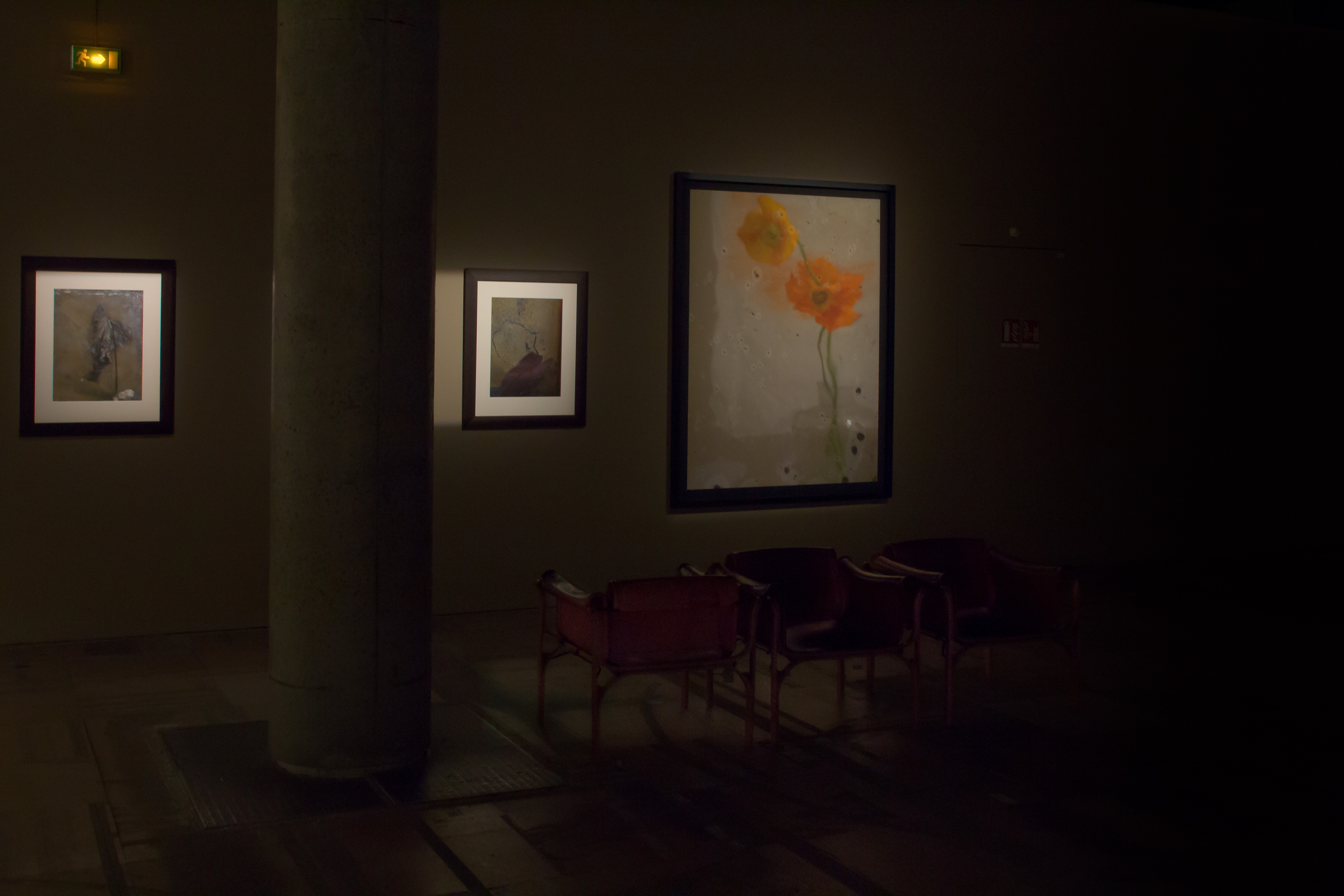
Exhibition at the Musée d’Histoire Naturelle, Paris (2013). Three plant photos including one of poppies.

- 1980: "Fashon" festival de photographie, Arles, France
- 1983: Center of Photography, New York
- 1993: Staley-Wise Gallery, New York
- 2002: Haus der Photographie, Hamburg
- 2003: Maison européenne de la photographie, Paris
- 2004: Kyoto Museum of Contemporary Art, Japan
- 2008: Cirkus, Leica Gallery, Prague
- 2011: Théâtre de la Photographie et de l'Image Charles Nègre, Nice
- 2011: 12345, Fotografiska Stockholm, Sweden
- 2012: The Black Hood, Multimedia Art Museum / Moscow House of Photography
- 2013: Alchimies: Sarah Moon, Musée d’Histoire Naturelle, Paris
- 2014: The Red Thread, Fotografiska Stockholm
- 2015: Sarah Moon − Now and Then, Haus der photographie Deichtorhallen, Hamburg
- 2016: Sarah Moon 1, 2, 3, 4, 5, Kahitsukan, Kyoto Modern Art Museum, Kyoto, Japan
- 2020: Sarah Moon − PastPresent, Musée d’Art Moderne de Paris, Paris
- 2021: Sarah Moon − At the Still Point, Fotografiska Stockholm, New York
- 2022: Sarah Moon − At the Still Point, Fotografiska Tallinn, Estonia

== Awards ==
- 1985: International Center of Photography's Infinity Award for Applied Photography
- 1995: Grand Prix national de la photographie, France
- 2007: The Cultural Award from the German Society for Photography (DGPh), with Robert Delpire
- 2008: Prix Nadar for (1 2 3 4 5, Delpire), Paris
- 2018: Honorary Fellowship of the Royal Photographic Society, Bath
- 2022: Induction into the International Photography Hall of Fame and Museum
