= The Americans (photography) =

1958 photographic book by Robert Frank

- The Americans, 1969 2nd printing
- Author: Robert Frank
- Language: French, English
- Subject: North American society
- Genre: Photography
- Publisher: Robert Delpire, Grove Press, Steidl
- Publication date: 1958
- Publication place: France
- Media type: Hardback
- ISBN: 978-3-865215-84-0 (Steidl edition)

The Americans is a photographic book by Robert Frank which was highly influential in post-war American photography. It was first published in France in 1958, and the following year in the United States. The photographs were notable for their distanced view of both high and low strata of American society. The book as a whole created a complicated portrait of the period that was viewed as skeptical of contemporary values and evocative of ubiquitous loneliness. "Frank set out with his Guggenheim Grant to do something new and unconstrained by commercial diktats" and made "a now classic photography book in the iconoclastic spirit of the Beats".

== Background ==
In 1949, the new editor of Camera magazine, Walter Laubli (1902–1991), published a substantial portfolio of Jakob Tuggener pictures made at upper-class entertainments and in factories, alongside the work of 25 year-old Robert Frank who had just returned to his native Switzerland after two years abroad, with pages including some of his first pictures from New York. The magazine promoted the two as representatives of the ‘new photography’ of Switzerland.

Tuggener was a role model for the younger artist, first mentioned to him by Frank's boss and mentor, Zurich commercial photographer Michael Wolgensinger (1913–1990) who felt that Frank would never fit the commercial system. Tuggener, as a serious artist who had left the commercial world behind, was the “one Frank really did love, from among all Swiss photographers,” according to Guido Magnaguagno and Tuggener's Fabrik (1943), as a photo book sequenced poetically and conceived without text like a silent movie, was a model for Frank's conception of Les Américains published fifteen years later in Paris by Delpire, in 1958.

Inspired by fellow Swiss Tuggener's book, Bill Brandt's The English at Home (1936), and Walker Evans' American Photographs (1938), and on the recommendation of Evans (a previous recipient), Alexey Brodovitch, Alexander Liberman, Edward Steichen, and Meyer Schapiro, Frank secured a Guggenheim Fellowship from the John Simon Guggenheim Memorial Foundation in 1955 to travel across the United States and photograph all strata of its society. He took his family along with him for part of his series of road trips over the next two years, during which time he took 28,000 shots. Only 83 of those were finally selected by him for publication in The Americans.

Sean O'Hagan, writing in The Guardian, about the inclusion of The Americans as the starting point in David Campany's critical journey into the photographic road trip, The Open Road (2014), said "Swiss-born Frank set out with his Guggenheim Grant to do something new and unconstrained by commercial diktats. His aim was to photograph America as it unfolded before his somewhat sombre outsider's eye. From the start, Frank defined himself against the traditional Life magazine school of romantic reportage."

Frank's journey was not without incident. While driving through Arkansas, Frank was arbitrarily thrown in jail for three days after being stopped by the police who accused him of being a communist (their reasons: he was shabbily dressed, he was Jewish, he had letters about his person from people with Russian sounding names, his children had foreign sounding names – Pablo & Andrea, and he had foreign whiskey with him). He was also told by a sheriff elsewhere in the South that he had "an hour to leave town."

== Introduction ==
Shortly after returning to New York in 1957, Frank met Beat writer Jack Kerouac on the sidewalk outside a party and showed him the photographs from his travels. Kerouac immediately told Frank "Sure I can write something about these pictures," and he contributed the introduction to the U.S. edition of The Americans.

== Style ==
Frank found a tension in the gloss of American culture and wealth over race and class differences, which gave his photographs a clear contrast to those of most contemporary American photojournalists, as did his use of unusual focus, low lighting and cropping that deviated from accepted photographic techniques.

== Critical views ==
The book initially received harsh criticism in the US, where the tone of the book was perceived as derogatory to national ideals. Much of the criticism Frank faced was as well related to his photojournalistic style, wherein the immediacy of the hand-held camera introduced technical imperfections into the resulting images. Popular Photography, for one, derided Frank's images as "meaningless blur, grain, muddy exposures, drunken horizons and general sloppiness." This stands in contrast to Walker Evans' American Photographs, a direct inspiration to Frank, with its rigidly framed images shot via large-format viewcamera. Though sales were also poor at first, Kerouac's introduction helped it reach a larger audience because of the popularity of the Beat phenomenon. Over time and through its inspiration of later artists, The Americans became considered a seminal work in American photography and art history, and the work with which Frank is most clearly identified.

Sociologist Howard S. Becker has written about The Americans as social analysis:

Robert Frank's (...) enormously influential The Americans is in ways reminiscent both of Tocqueville's analysis of American institutions and of the analysis of cultural themes by Margaret Mead and Ruth Benedict. Frank presents photographs made in scattered places around the country, returning again and again to such themes as the flag, the automobile, race, restaurants—eventually turning those artifacts, by the weight of the associations in which he embeds them, into profound and meaningful symbols of American culture.

== Publishing history ==
The Americans, 1997 6th printing (3rd Scalo edition)

Frank's divergence from contemporary photographic standards gave him difficulty at first in securing an American publisher. Les Américains was first published on 15 May 1958 by Robert Delpire in Paris as part of its Encyclopédie Essentielle series. Writings by Simone de Beauvoir, Erskine Caldwell, William Faulkner, Henry Miller and John Steinbeck were included, that Delpire positioned opposite Frank's photographs. Many thought that Frank's photos served more to illustrate the writing rather than the converse. The cover was decorated with a drawing by Saul Steinberg.

In 1959, The Americans was finally published in the United States by Grove Press, with the text removed from the French edition due to concerns that it was too un-American in tone. The added introduction by Kerouac, along with simple captions for the photos, were now the only text in the book, which was intended to mirror the layout of Walker Evans' American Photographs.

On the occasion of the 50th anniversary of the book's original publication (15 May 2008), a new edition was published by Steidl. Frank was involved in the design and production of this edition which used modern scanning of Frank's original prints, and tritone printing. A new format for the book was worked out, new typography selected, a new cover designed and Frank chose the book cloth, foil embossing and endpaper. As he has done for every edition of The Americans, Frank changed the cropping of many of the photographs, usually including more information, and two slightly different photographs were used.

A new edition is due to be published in 2024 by Aperture after the publisher received a $1m endowment grant from the Andrea Frank Foundation.

== Exhibitions ==
- Ackland Art Museum, University of North Carolina at Chapel Hill, Chapel Hill, NC, 2008/2009
- Looking In: Robert Frank's The Americans, National Gallery of Art, Washington D.C., 2009; San Francisco Museum of Modern Art, San Francisco, CA, 2009; Metropolitan Museum of Art, New York City, 2009
