= Broadway by Light =

- Directed by: William Klein
- Release date: 1958
- Running time: 12 minutes
- Countries: France; United States
- Language: No dialogue

Broadway by Light is a 1958 French-American experimental short film debut by the photographer William Klein.

== Summary ==
A documentary study of nighttime at Times Square and the bright-lighted advertising of Broadway.

== Production ==
Klein was encouraged by French New Wave filmmakers Alain Resnais and Chris Marker (the latter responsible for the text at the beginning of the film).

== Reception and legacy ==
The film's pop art style contrasts the usually gritty photography of Klein, which were taken during daylight, thus being called the first pop film.

It earned praise from master auteur Orson Welles.
