= Alessandro Bertolotti =

Italian writer and photographer

Alessandro Bertolotti (born in 1960) is an Italian writer and photographer.

== Life ==
He has worked as a director of variety shows for the Italian television channel RAI for twenty-five years. He is also a photographer of female nudes and author of two works on Capri. His photographs are included in the archives of the Bibliothèque nationale de France. He is one of the largest collectors of erotic books and nude photographs in Europe. A portion of his book collection has been exhibited in the fall of 2007 at the Maison européenne de la photographie in Paris. His Books of Nudes (2007), according to ARTnews, "features published studies by photographers, both famous and forgotten, who have taken the naked body as their subject".

== Selected works ==
- Capri, la natura e la storia (in Italian). Fratelli Palombi. 1990. ISBN 978-88-7621-351-9.
- Nudo. I libri fotografici dal 1895 a oggi (in Italian). Contrasto. 2007. ISBN 978-88-6965-087-1.
- Books of nudes. Abrams Books. 2007. ISBN 978-0-8109-9444-7.
- Curiosa; la bibliothèque érotique (in French). Editions de la Martinière. 2012. ISBN 978-2-7324-5274-6.
- Guida alla letteratura erotica: dal Medioevo ai giorni nostri [Guide to Erotic Literature: from the medieval to our times] (in Italian). Odoya. 2015. ISBN 978-88-6288-284-2.
- Guida al cinema erotico & porno. Dal cinema muto a oggi [Guide to erotic & porn cinema. From silent cinema to today] (in Italian). Odoya. 2017. ISBN 978-88-6288-333-7.
