= Barbara Luisi =

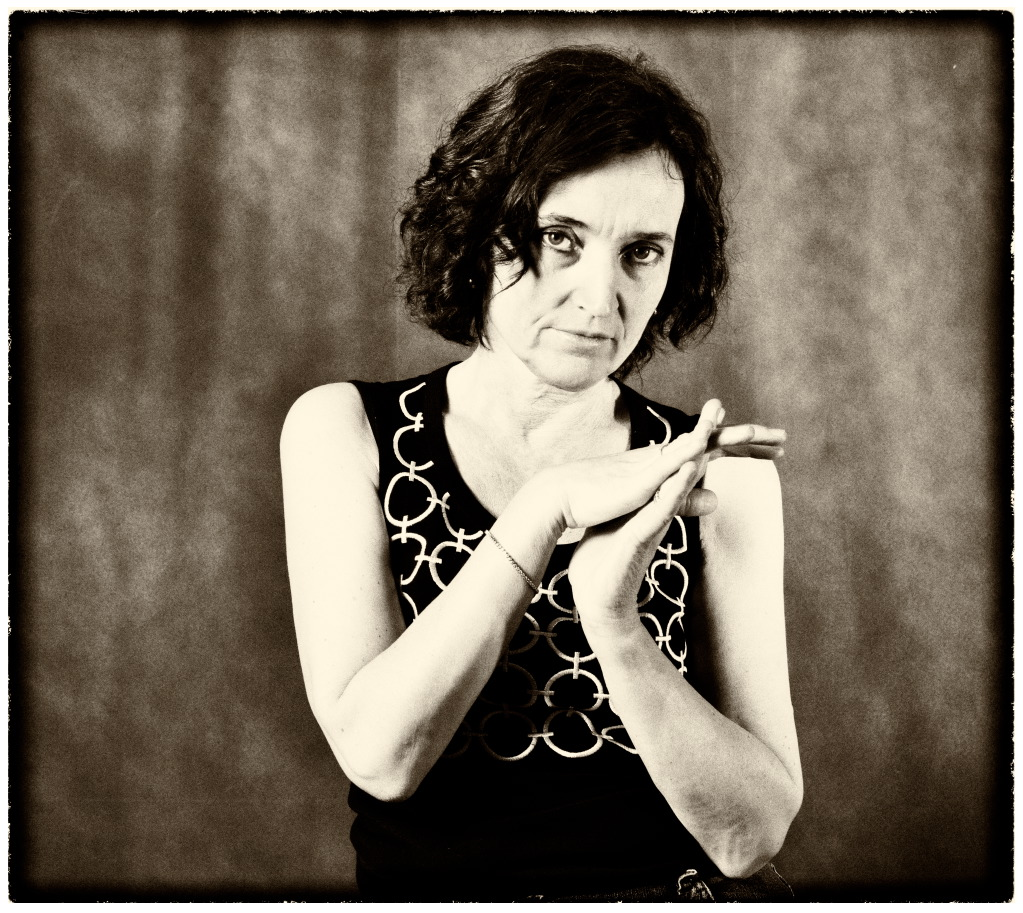
Self portrait of Luisi in 2013

Barbara Luisi is a German photographer and musician. After many years in New York City, she now lives and works in Vienna, Austria, and Venice, Italy.

== Life and career ==
Barbara Luisi was born and raised in Munich, Germany. She began playing the violin at the age of nine. After graduating from the Munich Arts and Music High School she studied violin at the Hochschule für Musik und Theater in Munich and obtained the Concert Diploma. She was a violinist in the Munich Philharmonic, the Orchestra of Toulouse and the Bavarian State Opera, as well as being the primaria (first violinist) in the Pocci String Quartet.

At age 17, she began learning photography, experimenting with a Leica M6 and developing her work in her own darkroom. Her photography has since been featured in international exhibitions, books, and other projects.

On 21 January 2020 she made her debut in Carnegie Hall as a violinist in a program with harpist Alexander Boldechev. Since then she has performed in museums and galleries in Europe, the US, Japan and India.

== Personal life ==
Barbara Luisi was married to conductor Fabio Luisi for 23 years, until 2020. They have three children together.

== Books ==
- Nude Nature. Böhlau, 2007.
- Glühende Nacht: Artificial Lights. Böhlau, 2008.
- Pearls, Tears of the Sea Böhlau, 2011.
- Dreamland Contrasto, 2014.
- ’’La Rose et l’Olivier.’’ Elzeviro 2022

== Exhibitions ==
- Ausstellung Pearls, Tears of the Sea, Hamburg.
- Nude Nature, Vienna
- 2014: Dreamland, Maison Européenne de la Photographie, Paris; Glorietta Gallery, Beirut, 2015 for PhotoMed.
- 2014: "Ouvres récentes," Maison de la Photographie, Paris.
- 2015: "Luci su Firenze, di notte",
- 2017: "The Spiritual South" Quick Art Center, NY
- 2018: "AKT" LeicaStore Rome, Italy and Rooney Gallery, Tokyo
- 2019 "Eternal Beauty" at SPARK, Venezia, Italy and "sacred Garden of India" Palazzo Grassi, Genova
- 2022: “la Rose et l’Olivier” Abbaye de la Celle, France
- 2025: “Odisseo in alto mare” Museo del mare, Galata Genoa Italy

https://www.goamagazine.it/al-galata-museo-del-mare-l11-aprile-linaugurazione-della-mostra-odisseo-in-alto-mare-di-barbara-luisi/ https://www.artribune.com/mostre-evento-arte/barbara-luisi-odisseo-in-alto-mare/

== General references ==
- Luisi, Barbara (2008). Glühende Nacht - artificial lights: Photographs. Germany: Böhlau Verlag Wien, 2008. p. 118. ISBN 9783205781899.
- Riechau, Cindy. "Photomed Liban: Showcasing the hidden concepts of the world". iloubnan.info.
- Luisi, Barbara (2014). Dreamland. Consortium Book Sales & Dist, 2014. p. 96. ISBN 9788869655005.
- https://www.artapartofculture.net/2018/12/05/akt-fotografie-di-barbara-luisi-leica-store-roma/
