= Who Are You, Polly Maggoo? =

1966 film by William Klein

- Theatrical release poster
- French: Qui êtes-vous, Polly Maggoo ?
- Directed by: William Klein
- Written by: William Klein
- Produced by: Robert Delpire
- Starring: Dorothy McGowan; Jean Rochefort; Sami Frey; Grayson Hall; Philippe Noiret; Alice Sapritch
- Cinematography: Jean Boffety
- Edited by: Anne-Marie Cotret
- Music by: Michel Legrand
- Production company: Delpire Productions
- Distributed by: Rank Organisation
- Release date: 21 October 1966
- Running time: 102 minutes
- Country: France
- Language: French

Who Are You, Polly Maggoo? (French: Qui êtes-vous, Polly Maggoo ?) is a 1966 French comedy-drama film written and directed by William Klein.

It is a satirical arthouse mockumentary spoofing the fashion world and its excesses. It stars Dorothy McGowan as Polly Maggoo, an American supermodel who is being followed by a French television crew, and Grayson Hall as Miss Maxwell, a fashion-magazine editor modeled after Diana Vreeland, and Philippe Noiret as the TV reporter and director. The cast also features Jean Rochefort, Sami Frey and Alice Sapritch.

McGowan was an American model prior to the film; she modeled for Vogue and Harper's Bazaar. After the release of the film, McGowan's first and only, she disappeared from public view and apparently neither acted nor modeled again, according to Klein.

== Plot ==
Polly Maggoo is a 20-year-old American model who has become a sensation in the Paris fashion scene. A satirical runway show features models wearing bizarre, metallic outfits resembling armor, designed by the fictional couturier Isidore Ducasse. The fashion world is depicted as absurd and fetishistic, with critics and designers raving over the impractical designs. Polly, walking the catwalk with poise, becomes the object of everyone's obsession.

A television crew, led by the smug and self-important Jean-Jacques Georges, begins filming a documentary about Polly for the show Qui êtes-vous...?. Jean-Jacques is determined to explore Polly's inner life, but the interviews he conducts reveal more about his own pretense and the superficial nature of media than about Polly herself.

The documentary segments are interspersed with scenes of Polly's everyday life, including stylized photo shoots, TV appearances, and interactions with industry people who either idealize or exploit her. As Polly recalls her working-class roots in Brooklyn, flashbacks and fantasy sequences show a stark contrast between her past life and the surreal world of fashion and fame she now occupies.

Polly is surrounded by photographers, journalists, and fashion insiders. She plays along with the attention but remains emotionally detached. In voiceover or fantasy sequences, Polly's childlike thoughts can be heard. She wonders about the authenticity of the world she has become part of and muses about love, identity, and meaning beyond surface appearances.

Prince Igor, heir to the throne of the fictional East European kingdom of Borodine, becomes obsessed with Polly after seeing her in a fashion magazine, and believes she is his soulmate. He travels to Paris with his entourage, including government officials and a bodyguard, hoping to meet and marry her. This storyline is treated with comic absurdity—Prince Igor's blind romanticism is contrasted with the artifice of the world Polly inhabits.

Polly briefly meets Igor at a party, and while he professes his feelings, she politely laughs him off, not taking him seriously. He interprets her reaction as encouragement and believes destiny will unite them.

As the documentary filming continues, it becomes increasingly stylized and self-parodic. At one point, Jean-Jacques subjects Polly to psychological tests and asks her pseudo-intellectual questions, to which she gives answers that are vague or ironic. Jean-Jacques tries to craft a narrative about Polly as a modern Cinderella or a tragic icon, but the viewer can see he is more concerned with style and drama than truth.

The TV documentary finally airs, presented as a slickly edited but ultimately shallow portrait of Polly. It tries to define her as a symbol of youth, modernity, and mystery—yet it never truly understands her. The people around her continue to speak about her as though she is not present.

Polly walks through Paris alone, surrounded by the city's glamour and indifference. Her expression remains enigmatic. Prince Igor, having failed in his mission, returns home after Polly's neighbor seduces him. Jean-Jacques and his crew move on to their next subject. Polly remains both everywhere and nowhere—a ghost in the media machine, a figure shaped by others' desires, still wondering who she really is.

== Cast ==
- Dorothy McGowan (credited as Dorothy MacGowan) as Polly Maggoo
- Jean Rochefort as Grégoire Pecque
- Sami Frey as Prince Igor
- Grayson Hall as Miss Maxwell
- Philippe Noiret as Jean-Jacques Georges
- Alice Sapritch as the queen mother
- Fernando Arrabal (credited as Arrabal) as the man with the shaving soap
- Jacques Rispal as the hair fetishist
- Michel Robin
- Joanna Shimkus
- Jacques Seiler as Isidore Ducasse, the couturier
- Roland Topor as an emissary of the prince
- Paul Bonifas
- René Clermont as the program director
- Gérard Darrieu as the cameraman
- Bernard Musson as the minister
- Delphine Seyrig as a journalist
- Geneviève Tabouis as herself
- Donyale Luna as a model
- Peggy Moffitt as a model
- Richard Avedon as a photographer
- Louis Faurer as a photographer
- Jeanloup Sieff as a photographer
