= Fabio Luisi =

Italian conductor

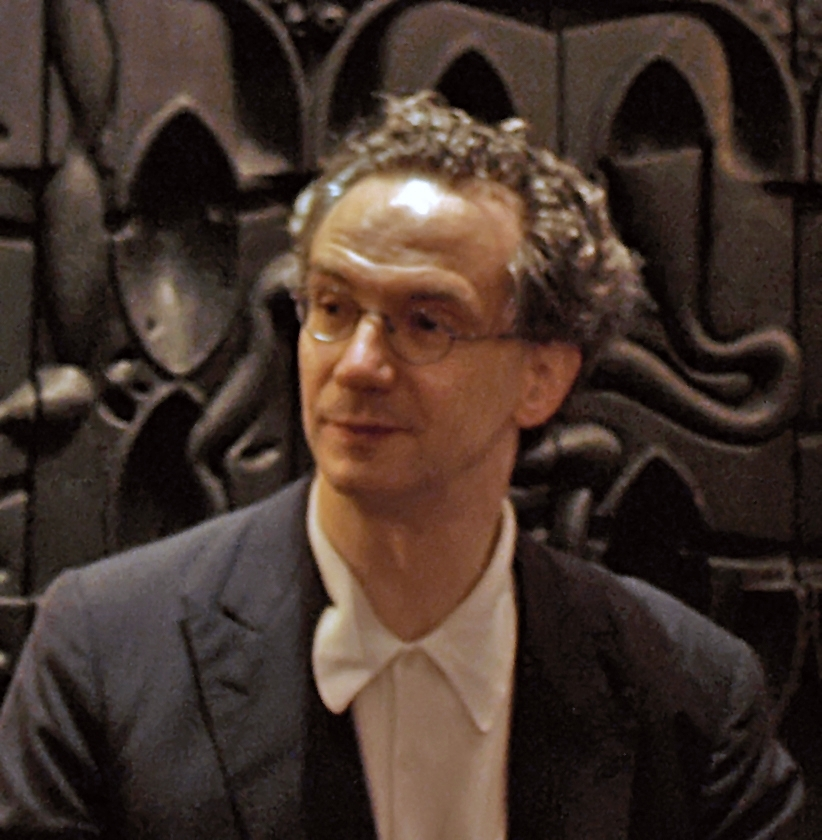
Fabio Luisi (2009)

Fabio Luisi (born 17 January 1959) is an Italian conductor. He is currently principal conductor of the Danish National Symphony Orchestra, music director of the Dallas Symphony Orchestra, and chief conductor of the NHK Symphony Orchestra.

== Biography ==
Luisi was born in Genoa. He attended the Conservatorio Nicolò Paganini and was a student of Memi Schiavina. After receiving his degree in piano studies, he continued piano instruction with Aldo Ciccolini and Antonio Bacchelli.

Luisi developed an interest in conducting while working as a piano accompanist, and he studied conducting at the conservatory in Graz with Milan Horvat. He worked at the Graz Opera as an accompanist and conductor. His first conducting appearance was in Italy in 1984. From 1990 to 1995, he was principal conductor of the Graz Symphony Orchestra. From 1995 to 2000, he served as artistic director and chief conductor of the Tonkünstlerorchester in Vienna. From 1996 to 1999, he was one of three main conductors (Hauptdirigenten) of the MDR Symphony Orchestra (Mitteldeutscher Rundfunk Sinfonieorchester) in Leipzig, along with Marcello Viotti and Manfred Honeck. From 1999 to 2007, he was sole principal conductor of the MDR orchestra. He was the principal conductor of l'Orchestre de la Suisse Romande from 1997 to 2002.

In January 2004, Luisi was named chief conductor of both the Staatskapelle Dresden and of the Semperoper, Dresden. He assumed both posts in September 2007. With the Staatskapelle Dresden, Luisi conducted commercial recordings of music by Richard Strauss and Anton Bruckner. Luisi was originally scheduled to step down as chief conductor of the Staatskapelle Dresden in 2012, at the expiration of his contract. However, he resigned from both Dresden posts in February 2010, with immediate effect, after reports that the Staatskapelle's management had secured a contract with the ZDF network for a scheduled televised concert on New Year's Eve, 2010 with Christian Thielemann as conductor, without consulting him at all in his capacity as the orchestra's GMD.

Luisi served as chief conductor of the Vienna Symphony from 2005 to 2013 season. He became Generalmusikdirektor (General Music Director) of the Zurich Opera in 2012, which also includes orchestral concert work with the opera orchestra under the name of the Philharmonia Zurich. He is scheduled to stand down as GMD of Zurich Opera after the close of the 2020–21 season. Luisi first conducted the Danish National Symphony Orchestra (DR SymfoniOrkestret) in 2010. In August 2014, the orchestra announced the appointment of Luisi as its next principal conductor, effective in 2017, with an initial contract through 2020. In May 2018, the DR SymfoniOrkestret announced the extension of Luisi's contract through 2023. In August 2020, the orchestra announced a further extension of Luisi's contract with the DR SymfoniOrkestret through 2026. In August 2023, the DNSO announced a further extension of Luisi's contract as chief conductor, through 2029. In August 2026, the DNSO announced the newest extension of Luisi's contract, through 2032.

In January 2016, the Opera di Firenze announced the appointment of Luisi as its next music director, the first conductor to hold that title with the company, and in parallel, as director of the Maggio Musicale Fiorentino, as of April 2018, with an initial contract of five years. In July 2019, Luisi resigned as music director of the Maggio Musicale Fiorentino with immediate effect.

In the United States, Luisi made his Metropolitan Opera conducting debut in March 2005, with Giuseppe Verdi's Don Carlo. In April 2010, the company named Luisi as principal guest conductor, for an initial contract of three years, effective with the 2010–11 season. Luisi was the second conductor to hold this title at the Metropolitan Opera, after Valery Gergiev. The company elevated Luisi to the post of principal conductor in September 2011, when music director James Levine withdrew from his scheduled fall 2011 performances. Luisi stood down as principal conductor of the Metropolitan Opera at the close of the 2016–2017 season.

In 2002, Luisi first guest-conducted the Dallas Symphony Orchestra. His next Dallas guest-conducting appearance was in March 2018. On the basis of this guest-conducting engagement, in June 2018, the Dallas Symphony named Luisi its next music director, effective with the 2020–21 season. He held the title of music director-designate for the 2019–20 season. In January 2021, the Dallas Symphony Orchestra announced the extension of Luisi's contract as music director through 2029.

Luisi had first guest-conducted the NHK Symphony Orchestra in July 2001. In April 2021, the NHK Symphony Orchestra announced the appointment of Luisi as its next chief conductor, effective September 2022, with an initial contract of 3 years. In August 2023, the NHK Symphony Orchestra announced the extension of his contract as its chief conductor through August 2028. In April 2026, the NHK Symphony Orchestra announced that Luisi is to conclude his tenure as its chief conductor at the close of August 2028, and to take the title of honorary conductor laureate in September 2028.

In May 2021, the RAI National Symphony Orchestra announced the appointment of Luisi as its conductor emeritus, following his 2017 guest-conducting debut with the orchestra and five subsequent concerts as guest conductor.

== Recordings ==
Luisi has conducted several opera recordings, including Giuseppe Verdi's Aroldo, Jérusalem and Alzira, and Gioacchino Rossini's William Tell. He won a Grammy Award for his leadership of Siegfried and Götterdämmerung on a Deutsche Grammophon DVD release of Richard Wagner’s operatic cycle, Der Ring des Nibelungen. His discography includes symphony cycles by Franz Schmidt, Carl Nielsen, Robert Schumann, and Johannes Brahms.

== Personal life ==
Luisi has been married three times. His first two marriages, to Yvonne Luisi-Weichsel (1957–2021) and to Barbara Luisi (born 1964), a violinist and visual artist, ended in divorce. His third wife, since 2022, is Yulia Luisi-Levin (born 1981), vocal coach, pianist, and repetiteur at the Zurich Opera House. Luisi has three sons, two of them from his marriage to Barbara Luisi. Outside of music, his hobbies include the production of his line of perfumes and golf.

== Honours and awards ==
- Honorary Professor of Conducting at the University of Music and Theatre Leipzig (2001)
- Austrian Cross of Honour for Science and Art (2000)
- Supersonic Award for Record of the Month (music magazine Pizzicato, January 2006) for the recording "Beethoven: Mass in C Major"
- Officer of the Order of Merit of the Italian Republic (2 June 2006)
- Bruckner Ring (Vienna Symphony, 2007)
- Commander of the Order of the Star of Italian Solidarity (2008)
- Echo Klassik (2008), for surround recording of the year: Richard Strauss: An Alpine Symphony / Four Last Songs
- Echo Klassik Orchestra of the Year (2009) with the Staatskapelle Dresden for "Bruckner: 9 Symphony"
- Grammy Award for Best Opera Recording (2013) with the Metropolitan Opera for Richard Wagner's Der Ring Des Nibelungen
- Honorary Doctor of Humane Letters at St. Bonaventure University (2017)
- Gramophone Award 2023 for the recording of all Carl Nielsen's Symphonies for DGG with Danish National Symphony Orchestra
- Gramophone Award 2023 for the best orchestral recording (Carl Nielsen's 4th and 5th Symphony) with Danish National Symphony Orchestra
- Premio Abbiati per la migliore registrazione 2023, Le Sinfonie di Carl Nielsen with DGG
- Limelight Award 2023 for the best recording project 2023, Carl Nielsen's Symphonies for DGG with Danish National Symphony Orchestra
- Ridderkorset (Knight's Cross) from the queen of Denmark (2023)

Cultural offices
Preceded by Daniel Nazareth	Principal Conductor, MDR Sinfonieorchester; 1999–2007	Succeeded by Jun Märkl
Preceded by Daniele Gatti (chief conductor)	Generalmusikdirektor, Zurich Opera; 2012–2021	Succeeded by Gianandrea Noseda
Preceded by Rafael Frühbeck de Burgos	Principal Conductor, Danish National Symphony Orchestra; 2017–present	Succeeded by incumbent
Preceded by Zubin Mehta (principal conductor)	Music Director, Opera di Firenze and Maggio Musicale Fiorentino; 2018–2019	Succeeded by Daniele Gatti
Preceded by Paavo Järvi	Chief Conductor, NHK Symphony Orchestra; 2022–present	Succeeded by incumbent
