= Couvent des Minimes de Grenoble =

Former monastery in Grenoble, France

Coordinates: 45°11′36″N 5°44′00″E

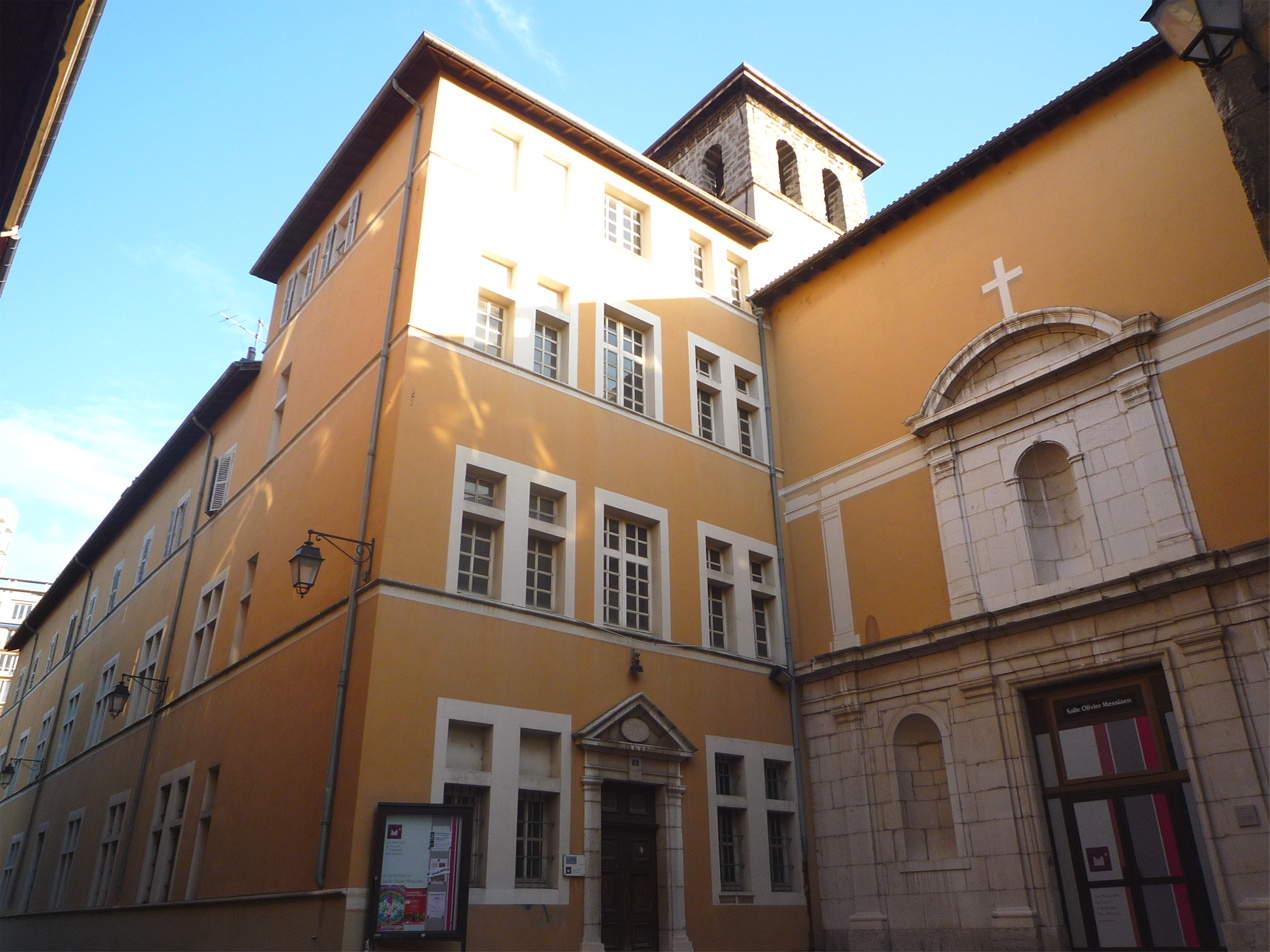
Couvent des Minimes

The Couvent des Minimes de Grenoble (English: Minim Monastery of Grenoble) is a former monastery constructed about 1644 by the Minim friars, a semi-contemplative mendicant order, which is located on the Rue du Vieux Temple in Grenoble, France.

Occupied by several institutions since the expulsion of the friars during the French Revolution, it is currently used as a student dormitory and the former chapel serves as a concert hall, particularly as the base of the orchestral group, Les Musiciens du Louvre.

== Minim monastery ==
=== Founding ===
The Minim friars had founded their first monastery in the region, the Minim Monastery of the Plains, in 1494, in the village of Saint-Martin-d'Hères on the outskirts of Grenoble. It became established as the motherhouse of the Order for France. Over time, many prominent figures of the region came to be interred in its chapel, people such as the Chevalier de Bayard, a noted military commander of the early 16th century.

During the 17th century, in the course of a major religious revival which swept France, the friars decided that they wanted to relocate to within the city walls of Grenoble, where they could be more accessible to the faithful. In 1642 they acquired some property in the city and wished to build on that. In November of the following year, they obtained the reluctant permission of the Bishop of Grenoble, Pierre Scarron, for the project. The bishop, however, demanded assurances from the Order that this new foundation would not interfere with the operation of the Monastery of the Plains. An inheritance which the monastery received from a local widow in 1644 permitted the work to commence. Scarron, however, withdrew his permission a year later, this despite the fact that construction was already underway. It took the issuance of letters patent by King Louis XIV in January 1646 for the construction to go forward to completion.

=== Later history ===
The Minim friars followed a fairly monastic routine of life, supplying their own needs through the labor of the friars, whether tailors or stonemasons. The presence of a stable attests to a certain level of traffic by the friars in their work.

In 1671, the friars began to complain to the authorities that their solitude was being disrupted by hymn singing coming from the Huguenot church located near their monastery. By a royal decree, the Protestant congregation was forced to move out of the city. The grounds on which their church stood was then appropriated and a seminary was built for the local diocese on the site. In 1707 construction was begun on a wall to enclose the monastery grounds, uniting the various buildings within its confines.

Despite their assurances to Bishop Scarron (+1668), the friars eventually came to abandon the original monastery. As had been the case with that institution, the prominent of the city wished to be buried in chapel of the new monastery. The regional lawyers' association held their meetings and housed their library there from 1748 to 1776.

When the monastery was founded, the Minims agreed to the use of the chapel as the meeting place of a fraternity of the Third Order of the Trinitarian Order, who had been founded in the 13th century for the rescue of Christians enslaved by Muslim forces. Possibly due to this connection, the monastery came to host a group of 48 slaves who arrived on 6 September 1785, requiring the friars to purchase sufficient straw mattresses and blankets for the comfort of their guests. The two days that the group stayed there was considered a notable event in the city history.

At the time this event took place, the city authorities were drawing up a plan to take possession of the monastery, whose occupants had dwindled to five friars. The proposal was to convert the monastery buildings into barracks for military use. The outbreak of the French Revolution put a stop to the project.

== Later use ==
Under the policies of Revolutionary France, in 1790 all religious orders were suppressed. The monastery was declared state property and confiscated and the friars were expelled. The monastery buildings were soon converted into workshops where tradesmen such as blacksmiths and carpenters could conduct their craft. When a concordat was signed between the Emperor Napoleon and Pope Pius VII in 1801, the Catholic Church was again allowed to function publicly. The next year, the local bishop was able to retrieve possession of this monastery, which by then was badly damaged. The city authorities of Grenoble had tried to block this return of the complex to the Church but were unsuccessful. They soon arranged to purchase it from the local bishop, which was accomplished on 10 August 1803.

=== Seminary ===
Shortly thereafter, however, the new Bishop of Grenoble, Claude Simon, began to seek a site for the establishment of a new seminary, as the previous one had been destroyed. With the help of the city's mayor, he was able to obtain the use of the former monastery for this purpose, and permission for this was granted by the emperor in 1806. The necessary renovations were made and the new facility opened its doors on 3 November of that year. The chapel was solemnly re-consecrated on the following 23 March.

The seminary chapel was to become the site of ordination of two men later acclaimed as saints by the Catholic Church. The first was that of the famed priest John Vianney, although he was not a student of the school, in 1815. The other was that in 1834 of Peter Julian Eymard, who went on to found a religious congregation dedicated to evangelization focused on the Blessed Sacrament. Enrollment at the seminary reached its peak in 1875, with 150 seminarians attending it. Although the seminary was operating in the facilities, the buildings remained government property, the city having sold it in 1811 to the Prefecture of Grenoble.

=== University and conservatory ===
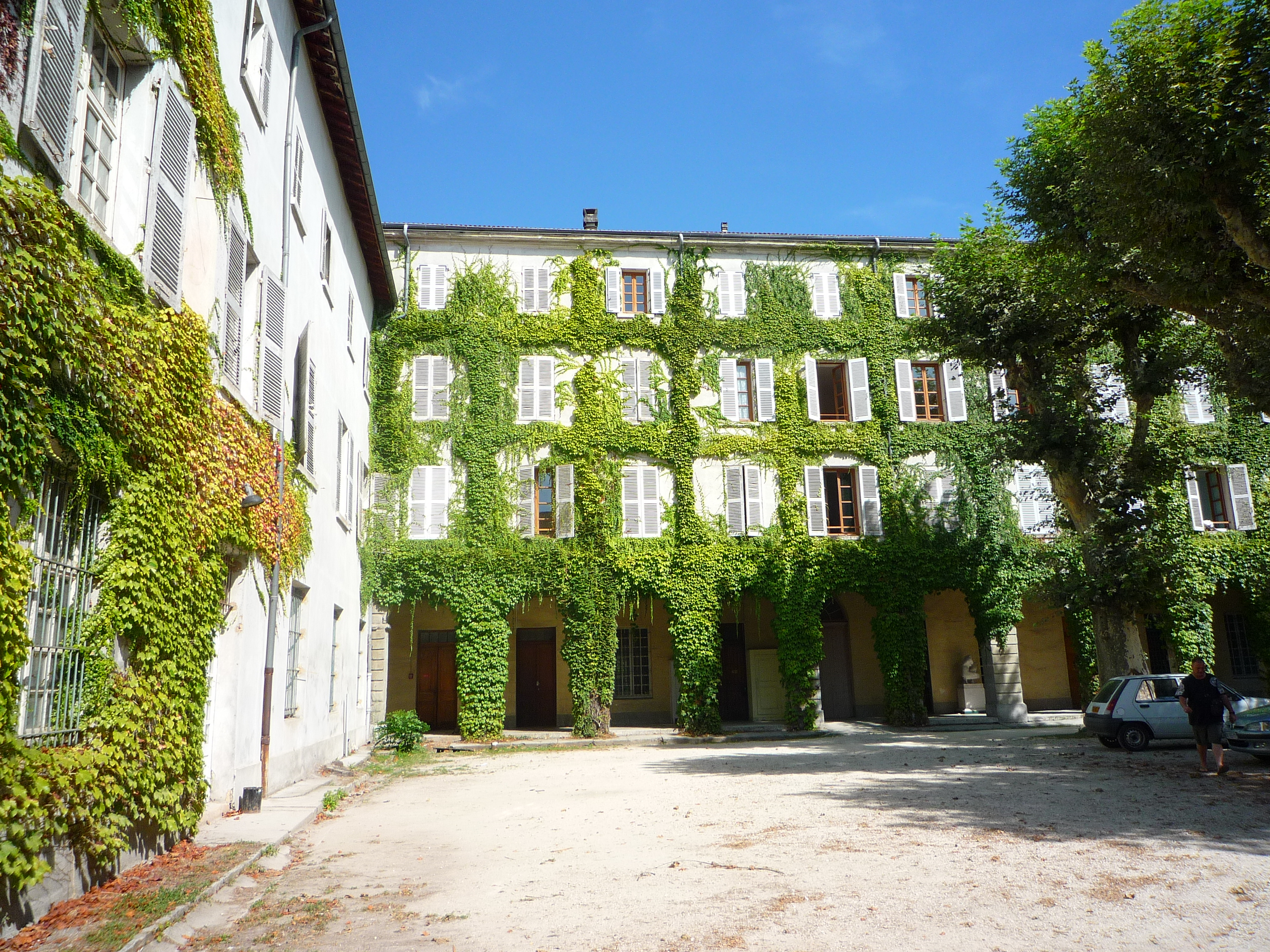
courtyard of the monastery

The French government passed a series of measures on 9 December 1905 which were intended to enact a strict separation of the Church from the State. This resulted in the expulsion of the seminary in Grenoble from its location, and the seizure of all its possessions.

The prefecture sold the property to the University of Grenoble in 1913. When World War I broke out on 4 August 1914, however, the buildings were occupied by the French army. It was five years before the university was able to retake possession of the property, by then badly damaged. Repairs were made and the buildings became a student dormitory.

During the Second World War, part of the facilities were made available to the Conservatory of Grenoble, which had lost its own location. This organization remained there until 1970, at which time badly needed repairs were made to the buildings. In November 1979, title to the building was transferred to the National Ministry of Education.

The former chapel has been converted into a concert hall and was renamed Olivier Messiaen Hall on 1 October 1981.
