= Messiah (1999 film) =

- Directed by: William Klein
- Produced by: Michel Rotman
- Music by: George Frideric Handel
- Release date: 1999
- Running time: 117 minutes
- Country: France

Messiah (1999) — in French, Le Messie — is a film performance of George Frideric Handel's oratorio Messiah (1741) with accompanying photographs and filmed images (shot in France, the United States and Russia) assembled by American-born French photographer William Klein. The music was directed by Marc Minkowski conducting the Musiciens du Louvre/Grenoble Orchestra and Chorus. Producer was Michel Rotman. The film was a co-production of Kuiv Productions/France 2-Cinema, Canal+ and La Sofica Gimages 2.

== Soloists ==
- Alto – Charlotte Hellekant
- Soprano – Lynne Dawson
- Soprano – Nicole Heaston
- Mezzo-soprano – Magdalena Kožená
- Countertenor – Brian Asawa
- Tenor – John Mark Ainsley
- Baritone – Russel Smythe
- Bass – Brian Bannantyne-Scott
