= André François (cartoonist) =

French cartoonist (1915–2005)

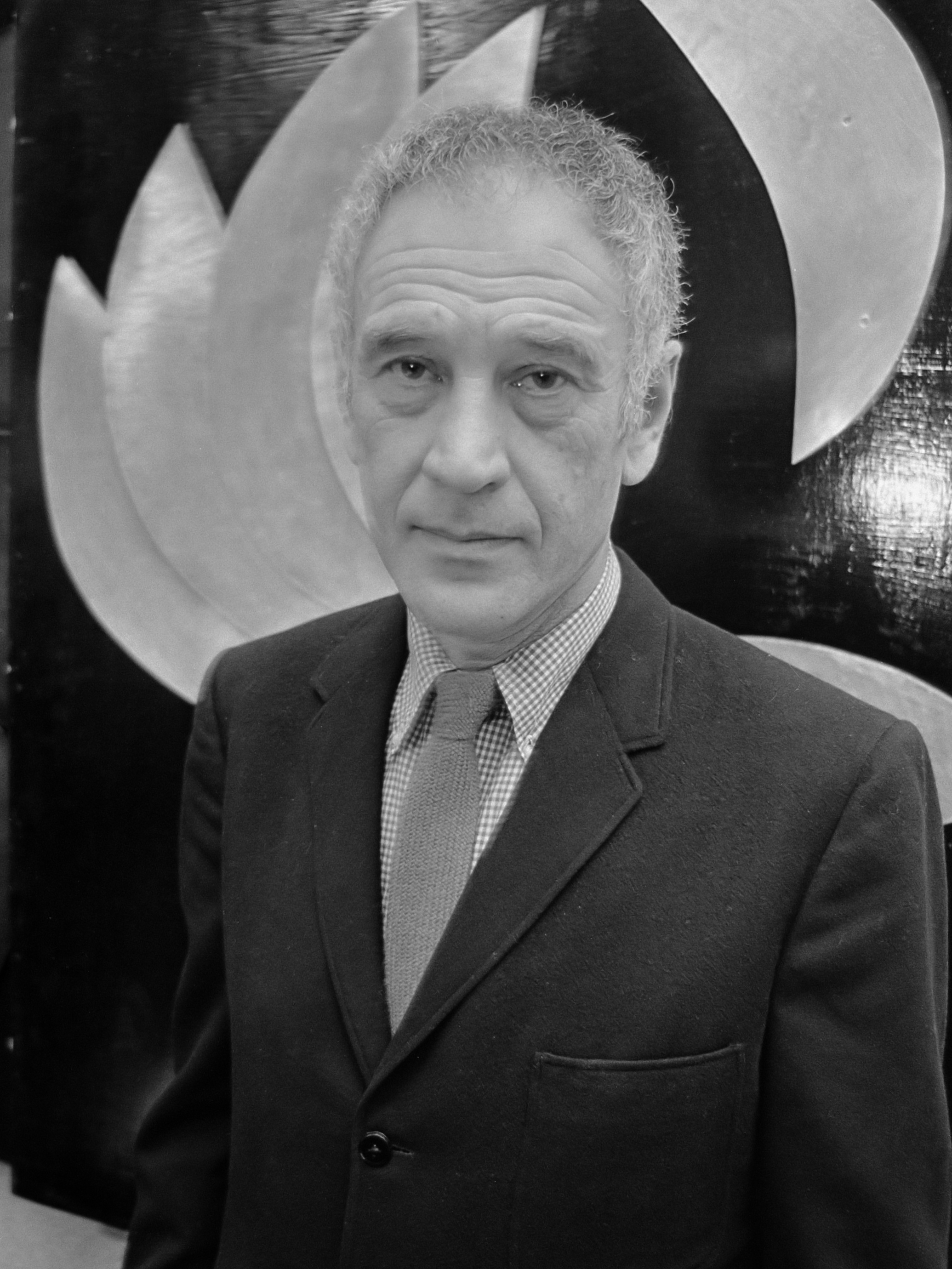
- André François (1967)
- Born: André Farkas; 9 November 1915 Temesvár, Austria-Hungary (now Timișoara, Romania)
- Died: 11 April 2005 (aged 89) Grisy-les-Plâtres, Val-d'Oise
- Area: Cartoonist

André François (9 November 1915 – 11 April 2005), born André Farkas, was a Hungarian-born French cartoonist. He was one of the most influential graphic artists of his generation. Since the 1960s he had worked primarily as a painter, sculptor, cartoonist (notably for the New Yorker and Punch), poster artist, and as an award-winning author and illustrator of children's books.

== Life ==
He was born in Temesvár, Austria-Hungary (now Timișoara, Romania). He studied at the Academy of Fine Arts in Budapest (1932–33). He moved to Paris in 1934 and entered to the atelier of the famous poster artist Adolphe Cassandre (1935–36). He became a French citizen in 1939.

He worked as a painter, sculptor and graphic designer, but is best remembered for his cartoons, whose subtle humor and wide influence bear comparison to those of Saul Steinberg. François initially worked for French leftist newspapers (Le Nouvel Observateur) and illustrated books by authors such as Jacques Prévert, but gradually reached a larger audience, publishing in leading magazines of the United Kingdom (Punch) and the United States (The New Yorker). He also did a masterpiece cover illustration of the 1965 UK Penguin paperback edition of Lord of the Flies. He became a close friend and collaborator of Ronald Searle. He was member of Alliance Graphique Internationale.

== Death ==
He died in his home in Grisy-les-Plâtres, in the Val-d'Oise département.

== Publications ==
- Les Larmes de Crocodile = Crocodile Tears.
- Neuf No. 9. Paris: Maison de la Médecine, 1953. OCLC 864302499.
- The Tattooed Sailor. (Introduction by Walt Kelly.) New York: Alfred Knopf. 1953.
- Paris: Delpire, 1955. OCLC 459725216.
- Crocodile Tears. London: Faber and Faber, 1955. ISBN 9780571090280. Translated by E.M. Hatt.
- Double Bedside Book

== Exhibition ==
- 2009: Rencontres d'Arles festival

== See also ==
- Musée Tomi Ungerer/Centre international de l'illustration
