= Maison européenne de la photographie =

Contemporary art museum in Paris, France

Coordinates: 48°51′18″N 2°21′32″E

Maison Européenne de la Photographie (MEP)
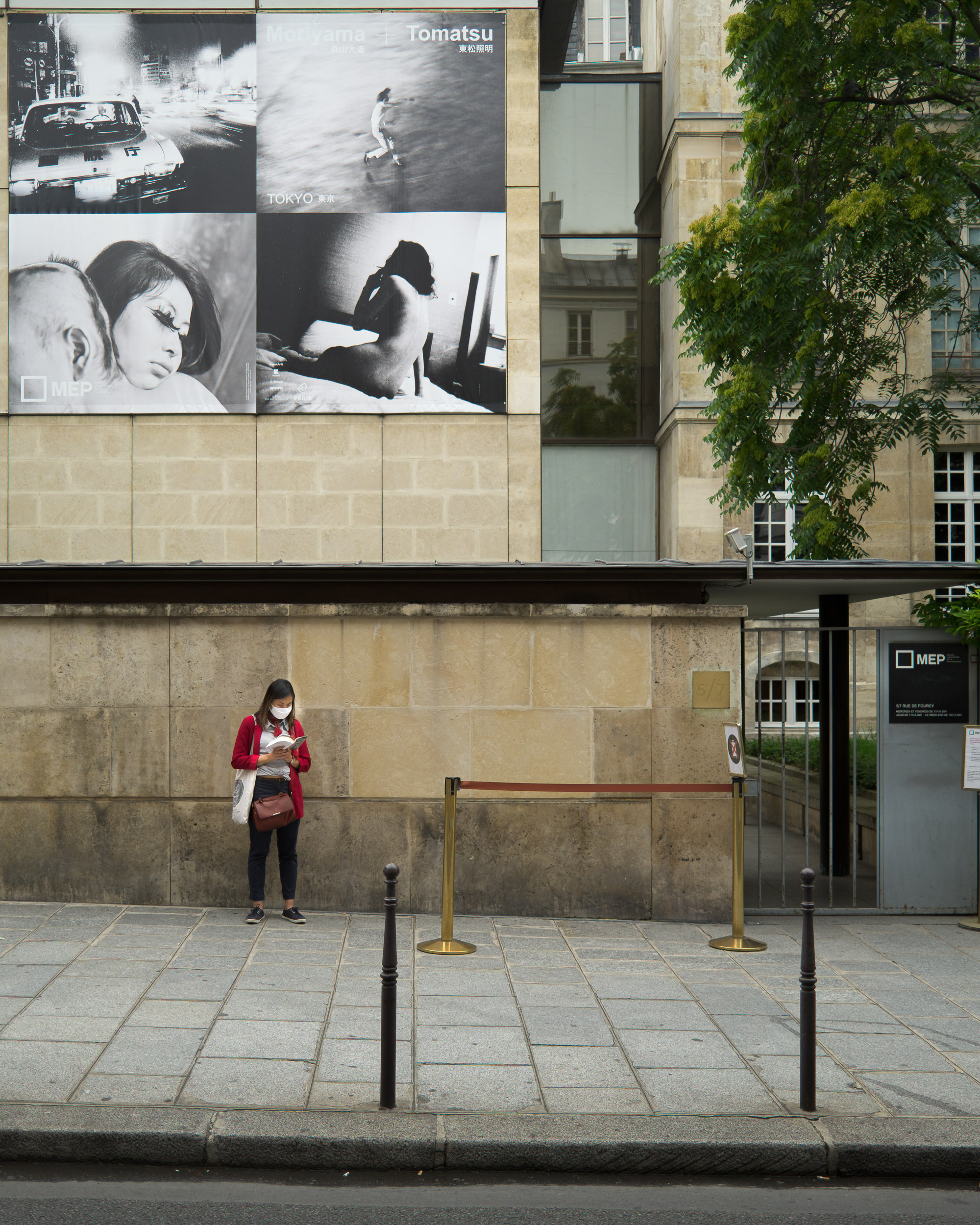
- Established: 1996
- Location: 5/7 rue de Fourcy, 75004 Paris
- Type: Center for contemporary photographic art
- Visitors: 150.000 per year
- Director: Jean-Luc Monterosso
- President: Henry Chapier
- Public transit access: Saint-Paul; Pont Marie
- Website: http://www.mep-fr.org

The Maison Européenne de la Photographie (MEP; European house of photography), located in the historic heart of Paris, is a center for contemporary photographic art opened in February 1996.

== Location and activities ==
The Hotel Henault de Cantobre, which was built in 1706, houses the Maison Européenne de la Photographie and is located at n. 5, Rue de Fourcy. It belongs to the City of Paris since 1914. The city authorities asked the Yves Lion firm of architects to undertake the restoration of the original building, as well as the addition of a new wing on the Rue de Fourcy. The façade overlooking the street, the period ironwork and the central staircase are all examples of classical architecture.

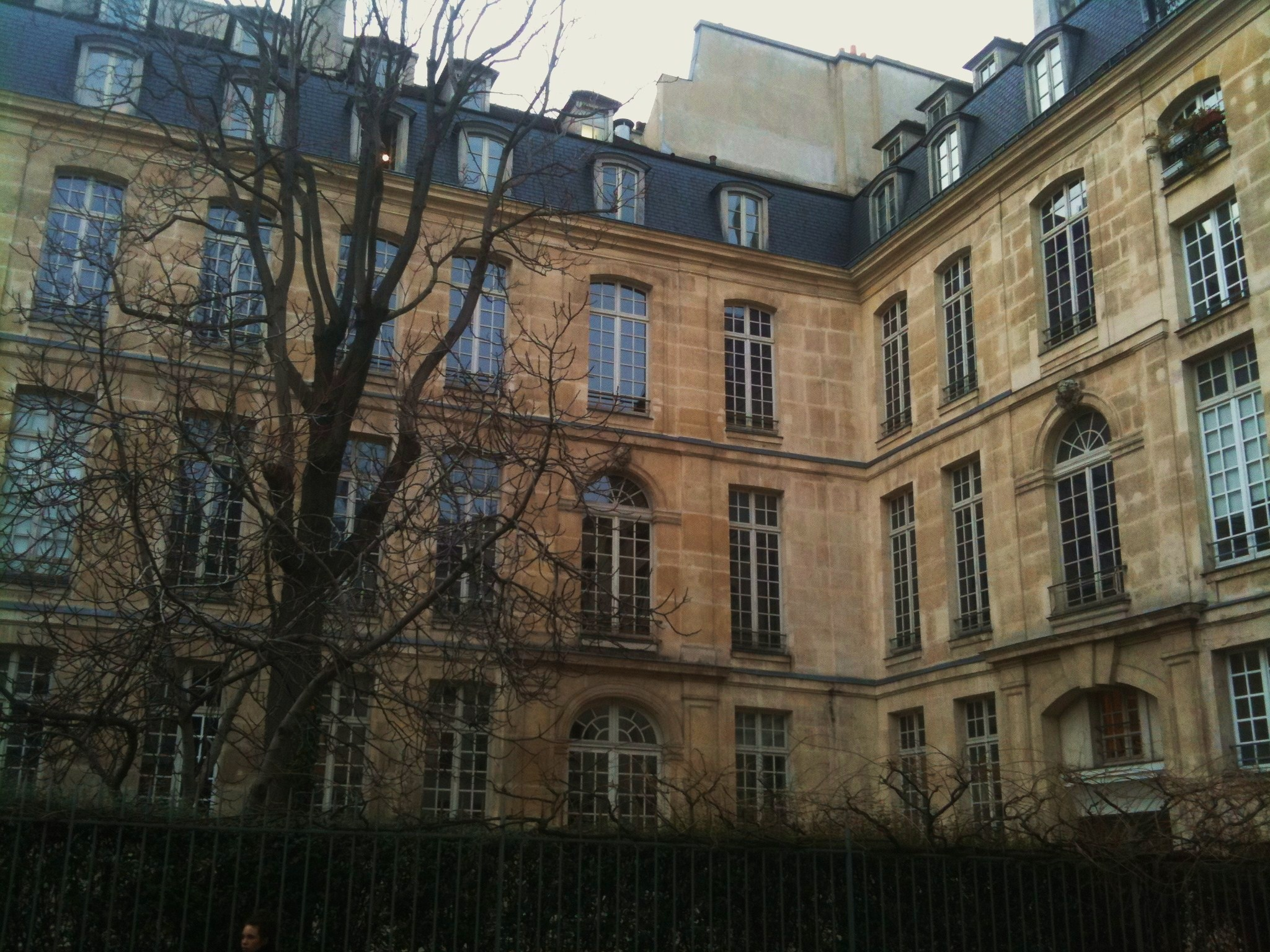
External view of the Hôtel Hénault de Cantobre

It houses an exhibition center, a large library, an auditorium, and a video viewing facility with a wide selection of films. The visitor can also enjoy the Café sited under the 18th century vaults and a specialized bookstore. The MEP is designed to make the three fundamental photographic media (exhibition prints, the printed page, and film) easily accessible to all. It offers numerous commented visits, conferences and films cycles in relation with the exhibitions. The Hotel houses a photographic restoration and conservation workshop too (Atelier de Restauration et de Conservation des Photographies de la Ville de Paris, or ARCP). Since 1983 it has worked to preserve the photographic patrimony of the libraries, the archives and the museums of the Paris municipality, and it offers its services to other French or foreign institutions too.

The collection is dedicated to the contemporary creation. It owns about twenty thousands works of art, mostly photographs (silver and digital photography) and videos. The library gathers 24.000 volumes about photography, artists’ books as well as technical or theoretical works, including rare editions. Three or four exhibition cycles are organized every year about artists, themes and movements which mainly belong to the second half of the 20th century and the 21st century.

The Maison Européenne de la Photographie is directed since 1996 by Jean-Luc Monterosso (Director) and Henry Chapier (President).

== Access and hours ==
Métro: Saint-Paul and Pont Marie. The Maison Européenne de la Photographie opens Wednesday to Sunday from 11.00am to 8.00pm. Free admission every Wednesday from 5.00pm to 8.00pm. The exhibition rooms are accessible to disabled persons.

== Selected exhibitions ==
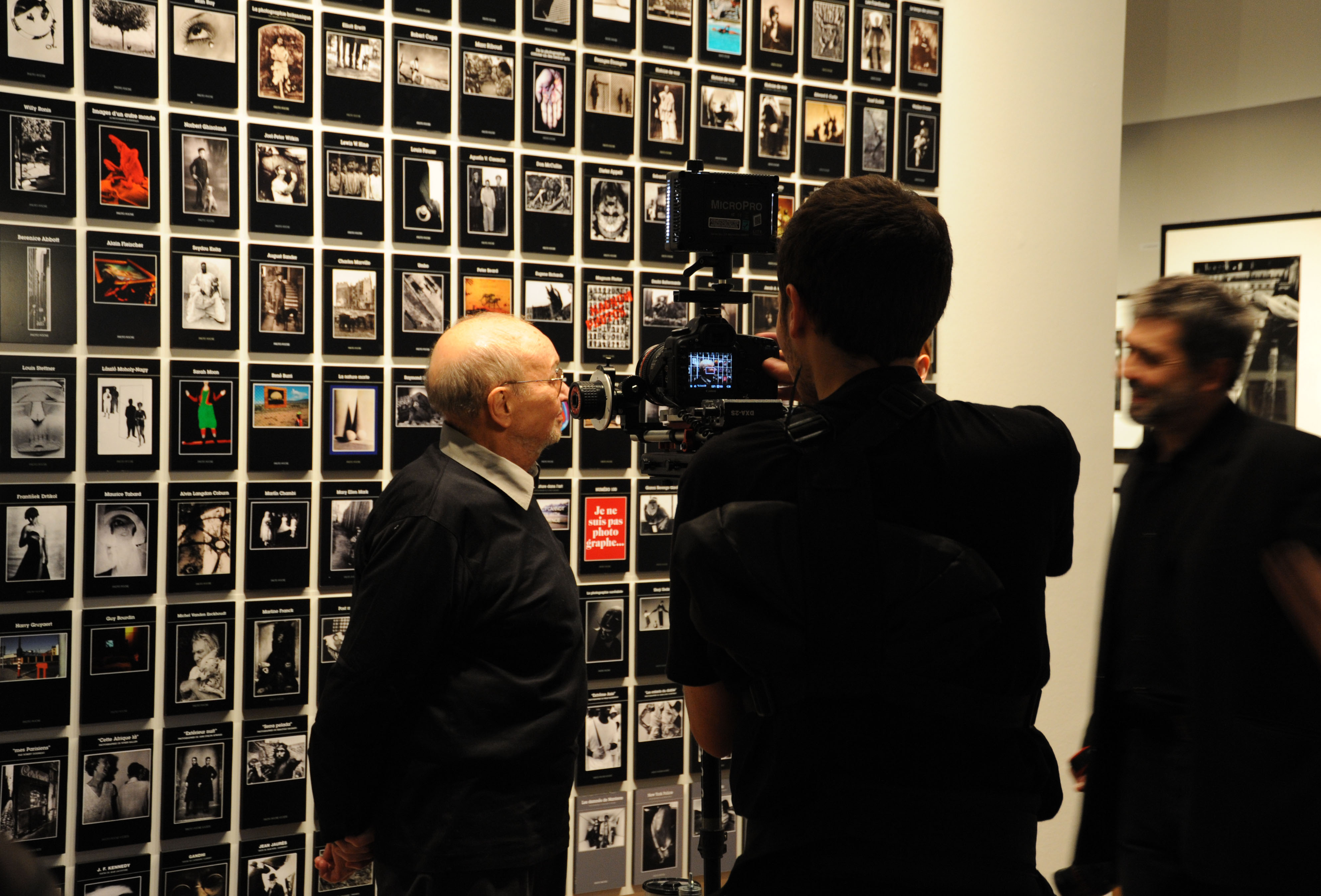
Robert Delpire, exhibition view, 2010

- 1998 : Shirin Neshat, "Women of Allah"
- 1998 : Robert Frank, "Les Américains"
- 1998 : "Polaroïd 50, art et technologie"
- 1999 : Orlan, "Self-hybridations"
- 1999 : Helmut Newton & Alice Springs, "Us and them"
- 1999 : David Hockney, "Photographies, 1968-1997"
- 2000 : Irving Penn, "A retrospective"
- 2000 : Bettina Rheims & Serge Bramly, "I.N.R.I."
- 2001 : Don McCullin, "Photographies 1961-2001"
- 2001 : Raymond Depardon, "Détours"
- 2002 : Josef Sudek, "Prague panoramique"
- 2003 : Alain Fleischer, "La vitesse d'évasion"
- 2004 : René Burri, "Photographies"
- 2005 : Martin Parr, "1971-2001"
- 2005 : Andy Warhol, "Red Books"
- 2005 : Dmitri Baltermants, "Rétrospective"
- 2006 : Bernard Faucon, "Rétrospective 1976-1985"
- 2006 : Johan van der Keuken, "Photographie et cinéma"
- 2007 : Larry Clark, "Tulsa, 1963-1971"
- 2007 : Alessandro Bertolotti, "Livres de nus, une anthologie"
- 2008 : Édouard Boubat, "Révélation"
- 2008 : Shōji Ueda, "Une ligne subtile"
- 2008 : Annie Leibovitz, "A Photographer's Life, 1990-2005"
- 2009 : Claude Lévêque, "Le Crépuscule du Jaguar"
- 2009 : Henri Cartier-Bresson, "A vue d'oeil"
- 2010 : Elliott Erwitt, "Personal Best"
- 2010 : Robert Delpire, "Delpire & Cie".
- 2011 : William Klein, "Rome + Klein"
- 2011 : Jane Evelyn Atwood, "Photographies 1976-2010"
- 2011 : Hervé Guibert, "Photographies"
- 2014 : Barbara Luisi, "Oevres récentes"
- 2019 : Ren Hang (photographer), "Love"
- 2021 : Daidō Moriyama and Shōmei Tomatsu, "Moriyama – Tomatsu; Tokyo "
- 2023 : Zanele Muholi
