= Bibliothèque de Poche =

French television show

- Directed by: Michel Polac
- Presented by: Yannick Bellon
- Country of origin: France
- Original language: French

Production
- Camera setup: Multi-camera
- Running time: 22–24 minutes

Original release
- Network: RTF
- Release: March 27, 1966 – May 8, 1970

Bibliothèque de Poche is a French television show discussing Literature. The show was created and presented by Michel Polac, it was broadcast from 1966 to 1970, on RTF.
