= Eldridge Cleaver, Black Panther =

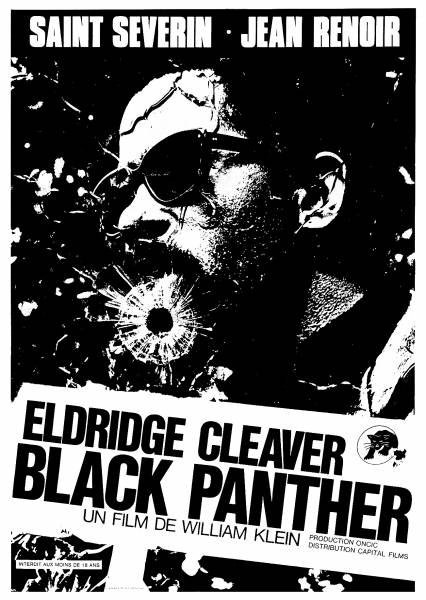
- Algerian film poster
- Directed by: William Klein
- Screenplay by: William Klein
- Produced by: O.N.C.I.C.
- Cinematography: William Klein
- Release date: 1969
- Running time: 75 minutes
- Country: Algeria

Eldridge Cleaver, Black Panther is a French-Algerian documentary film made in 1969 and directed by William Klein. The film covers Black Panther activist Eldridge Cleaver while exiled in Algeria. Cleaver moved to Algeria after the U.S. state of California tried to charge him with intent to murder. In the documentary, Cleaver discusses revolution in the United States and denounces political figures Richard Nixon, Spiro Agnew, Ronald Reagan and Richard J. Daley.

== Synopsis ==
In this documentary film, Black Panther activist Eldridge Cleaver speaks from his exile in Algeria—an exile prompted by a charge of attempted murder in California. Cleaver speaks openly about revolution in the United States and lists his greatest political rivals. The names of Nixon, Agnew, and McClelland appear alongside those of Ronald Reagan and Richard Daley. All were considered targets by numerous revolutionary groups in the United States.

== Release ==
On October 22, 1970, the full board of the Film Censorship Commission recommended a total ban: "The film presents itself, in essence, as a long interview with Eldridge Cleaver, leader of the Black Panthers. It has a dual nature: Eldridge Cleaver’s statements constitute a constant glorification of violent acts—such as murder, arson, the use of weapons, etc. The Commission deemed this to be a direct incitement to criminal acts punishable under French penal law and concluded that the film would, in itself, constitute a serious threat to public order as ordinarily understood by the Commission. Furthermore, the film contains a number of insults directed at foreign heads of state and, at the very least, an incitement to murder (or a threat of murder) against a specifically named individual"; the Minister ultimately granted an exhibition permit following protests.
