= Simon Neal (baritone) =

English operatic baritone

- Occupation: Operatic baritone
- Organizations: Oper Dortmund
- Website: simonnealbaritone.com

Simon Neal is an English operatic baritone. A member of the Oper Dortmund from 2006 to 2011, he has appeared in major roles at leading opera houses, including Pizarro in Beethoven's Fidelio with Opera Australia, the title role of Wagner's Der fliegende Holländer at the Opéra National de Lyon, and Telramund in Wagner's Lohengrin at the Royal Opera House. Besides the standard repertoire, he portrayed characters in 20th-century operas, such as the title role of Hindemith's Cardillac, the double role of Dr. Schön and Jack the Ripper in Alban Berg's Lulu, and Nekrotzar in Ligeti's Le Grand Macabre. He appeared as the Holländer in the world premiere of SehnSuchtMEER by Helmut Oehring in 2013.

== Life and career ==
Neal wanted to become a singer when he was a teenager. He graduated in composition at Leicester University. He then pursued a financial services career, working in automobile marketing. He studied voice privately with Neilson Taylor, saying in an interview that he had no voice training until age 36, and therefore never performed beginners' roles. His teacher prepared him for belcanto singing. Neal made his international debut as Pizarro in Beethoven's Fidelio at the Sydney Opera House in 2002, returning to sing Escamillo in Bizet's Carmen in 2005. He joined the ensemble at Oper Dortmund in 2006, when Christine Mielitz was Intendantin, and remained until 2011. Mielitz was also a director and polished his acting and text interpretation. He performed there 20 roles, 13 of them in new productions.

He performed at the Deutsche Oper am Rhein as Jago in Otello. His Wagner roles there have included Wotan in Das Rheingold from 2017 and in Die Walküre from 2018 and Wanderer in Siegfried, in a Ring production directed by Dietrich Hilsdorf. He participated in the world premiere of SehnSuchtMEER by Helmut Oehring, an adaptation of Wagner's Der fliegende Holländer, as the Holländer in 2013.

Neal made his debut at the Oper Frankfurt in 2009 as Mandryka in Arabella by Richard Strauss, followed by Kurwenal in Wagner's Tristan und Isolde, Achilles in Schoeck's Penthesilea, directed by Hans Neuenfels, the four villains in Offenbach's Les contes d'Hoffmann, and Scarpia in Puccini's Tosca. He portrayed the title role in Enescu's Œdipe, again directed by Neuenfels, and a reviewer noted his captivating performance, with a "dark, powerful bass baritone" that had "all the strength, but also the necessary elegance and culture for this demanding role and, above all, enormous empathic charisma". He appeared as the Forester in Janáček's Das schlaue Füchslein in a production that was recorded. In 2020 he performed as Mr. Gobineau in Menotti's The Medium. He portrayed Nekrotzar, the title role in Ligeti's Le Grand Macabre, conducted by Thomas Guggeis the same year. and Dr. Schön and Jack the Ripper in Alban Berg's Lulu in 2024. A reviewer of Lulu noted that he was elegant and powerful in voice and acting, in a fascinating role both violent and representative of a bourgeois society. The reviewer from Musik heute wrote that he was convincing in the facets of his obsessive relationship to Lulu.

Neal appeared in the title role of Wagner's Der fliegende Holländer at the Opéra National de Lyon in 2014, directed by Àlex Ollé. He performed the title role of Hindemith's Cardillac at Opera Vlaanderen in 2019, and a reviewer noted that he portrayed with a powerful voice the passionate and dominant artist who cannot let go of his creations. Neal appeared as Don Pizarro in Beethoven's Fidelio at Royal Opera House in London in 2020, in a production directed by Tobias Kratzer to celebrate Beethoven's 250th birthday, with Lise Davidsen in the title role and Jonas Kaufmann as Florestan, conducted by Antonio Pappano. It was telecast and filmed because live performances had soon to be cancelled due to the COVID-19 pandemic. Neal entered the scene on horseback.

Neil appeared at the Oper Leipzig as Jack Rance in Puccini's La fanciulla del West in a production conducted by Ulf Schirmer in 2018. He performed there also as Dr. Schön/Jack the Ripper. In 2021 he portrayed the archdiacon Claude Frollo in Franz Schmidt's rarely played Notre Dame at the St. Galler Festspiele. A reviewer of his Telramund at the Royal Opera House noted in 2022: "Simon Neal's strong yet nuanced singing revealed desperation and frustration mingled with a deep sense of honor"."

=== Personal life ===
Neal is married to a former singer who turned to working as a therapist. They have no children and live in Lincolnshire, north of London. He was granted Irish citizenship in addition to English after Brexit, because his grandfather was Irish.
