= Zouc =

Swiss actress

- Born: Isabelle von Allmen; 29 April 1950 (age 75); Saint-Imier, Canton of Bern, Switzerland
- Occupation(s): Actress, Cabaret singer

Isabelle von Allmen (born 29 April 1950), better known by the stage name Zouc, is a Swiss actress.

== Life and career ==
Isabelle von Allmen was born in Saint-Imier and raised in Saignelégier. By the age of 14 she was performing every night in front of a crossing for her friends.

Following the suggestion of Coghuf (original name: Ernst Stocker, painter from Basel), she took lessons in classical singing and music theory in Neuchatel, Switzerland. She became part of a team of authors with whom she developed the play allégria and appeared on stage for the first time.

In 1969 she moved to Paris where she took courses at the theater of Tania Balachova for a few months and staged her first solo play at “La Vieille Grille” theatre. The painter Roger Montandon invited her to pose for him, which led to an intense collaboration between the two artists, lasting for many years. Between 1970 and 1980 Zouc performed her play several hundred times, at the Vieux Colombier, the Théatre de la Ville, Le Palace, Bobino and in many other theatres in France and abroad. Meanwhile, thanks to her increasing contacts, Zouc performed in Jeux de massacre by Eugène Ionesco, staged by Jorge Lavelli, as well as in The Birds by Aristophanes with music by Antoine Duhamel at the Opéra de Lyon. She starred in many movies, working with Michel Drach, William Klein, Serguei Bordrov and Jacques Dillon. In 1983 she played against Pierre Dux in Monsieur Abel.

In 1984 she staged her play Zouc à l'école des femmes in collaboration with Roger Montandon. In 1987 a new show, developed in collaboration with Tara Depré, was presented at Le Bataclan.

During an operation for cancer of the sternum at the Marie Lannelongue hospital in Plessis-Robinson (near Paris) in 1997, Zouc caught a severe hospital-acquired infection (multi-resistant staphylococcus aureus). After nine further operations, her life was saved at the Croix-Saint-Simon hospital in Paris, but she remains seriously handicapped, ending her career on stage far ahead of her time.

== Selected filmography ==
- Speak to Me of Love (1975)
