= William Klein (photographer) =

Photographer and filmmaker (1926–2022)

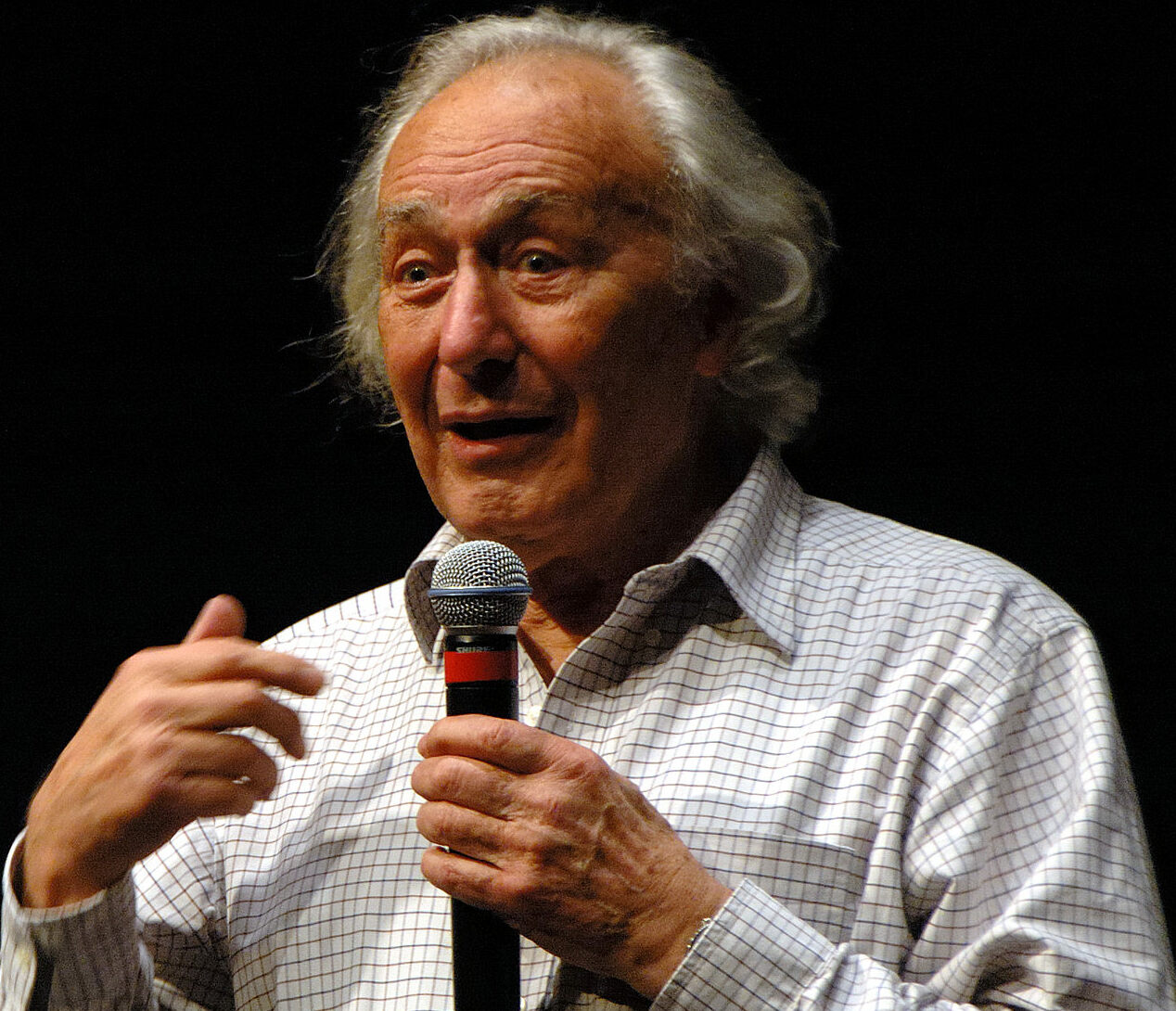
- Klein in 2008
- Born: April 19, 1926; New York City, U.S.
- Died: September 10, 2022 (aged 96); Paris, France
- Education: City College of New York; La Sorbonne
- Known for: Photography, cinema, painting
- Awards: See below
- Military career
- Allegiance: United States
- Branch: United States Army
- Service years: 1944–1948
- Unit: 2nd Armored Division
- Conflicts: World War II

William Klein (April 19, 1926 – September 10, 2022) was an American-French photographer and filmmaker noted for his ironic approach to both media and his extensive use of unusual photographic techniques in the context of photojournalism and fashion photography. He was ranked 25th on Professional Photographer's list of 100 most influential photographers.

Klein trained as a painter, studying under Fernand Léger, and found early success with exhibitions of his work. He soon moved on to photography and achieved widespread fame as a fashion photographer for Vogue and for his photo essays on various cities. He directed feature-length fiction films, numerous short and feature-length documentaries and produced over 250 television commercials.

He was awarded the Prix Nadar in 1957, the Royal Photographic Society's Centenary Medal and Honorary Fellowship (HonFRPS) in 1999, and the Outstanding Contribution to Photography Award at the Sony World Photography Awards in 2011.

A retrospective exhibition of his work, William Klein: YES: Photographs, Paintings, Films, 1948–2013, was shown at the International Center of Photography in New York until September 15, 2022.

== Early life and education ==
Klein was born in New York City into an impoverished Jewish family. He graduated from high school early and enrolled at the City College of New York at the age of 14 to study sociology. He joined the U.S. Army during World War II, and was stationed in Germany and later France with the 2nd Armored Division, where he permanently settled after being discharged in 1948.

In 1948, Klein enrolled at the Sorbonne, and later studied with Fernand Léger. At the time, Klein was interested in abstract painting and sculpture. In 1952, he had two successful solo exhibitions in Milan and began a collaboration with the architect Angelo Mangiarotti. Klein also experimented with kinetic art, and it was at an exhibition of his kinetic sculptures that he met Alexander Liberman, the art director for Vogue.

== Photography ==
He moved on to photography and achieved widespread fame as a fashion photographer for Vogue and for his photo essays on various cities. Despite having no formal training as a photographer, Klein won the Prix Nadar in 1957 for New York, a book of photographs taken during a brief return to his hometown in 1954. Klein's work was considered revolutionary for its "ambivalent and ironic approach to the world of fashion", its "uncompromising rejection of the then prevailing rules of photography" and for his extensive use of wide-angle and telephoto lenses, natural lighting and motion blur. The New York Times' Katherine Knorr writes that, along with Robert Frank, Klein is considered "among the fathers of street photography, one of those mixed compliments that classifies a man who is hard to classify."

Klein's most popular photographic works are Gun 1, New York (1955), The Holy family on bike (Rome, 1956), Cineposter (Tokyo, 1961), Vogue (fashion models in the streets of New York, Rome and Paris for Vogue magazine, 1963), Love on the Beat (Serge Gainsbourg album sleeve, 1984), Club Allegro Fortissimo (1990) and Autoportrait (a book of painted contact prints, 1995).

== Filmmaking ==
The world of fashion was the subject for the first feature film Klein directed in 1966, Who Are You, Polly Maggoo?, which, like his other two fiction features, Mr. Freedom and The Model Couple, is a satire.

He directed numerous short and feature-length documentaries, including the cinéma vérité documentary Grands soirs et petits matins, the 1964 documentary Cassius the Great, re-edited with new footage as Muhammad Ali: The Greatest in 1969. He produced over 250 television commercials. A long time tennis fan, in 1982 he directed The French, a documentary on the French Open tennis championship.

His work was sometimes openly critical of American society and foreign policy; the film critic Jonathan Rosenbaum once wrote that Mr. Freedom was "conceivably the most anti-American movie ever made."

== Death ==
Klein died in Paris on September 10, 2022, aged 96.

== Filmography ==
=== Documentary films ===
- Broadway by Light (1958). A study of Broadway by night.
- Les troubles de la circulation (1962). Paris traffic jams for French TV.
- Le business et la mode (1962).
- Les français et la politique (1962).
- Gare de Lyon (1963).
- Cassius, le grand (1964–65). Film of Sonny Liston Cassius Clay fight in Miami.
- Aux grands magasins with Simone Signoret (1964).
- Loin du Viêt Nam (1967). Collective film with segments contributed by Klein, Jean-Luc Godard, Chris Marker, Claude Lelouch, Alain Resnais, Joris Ivens and Agnès Varda.
- Festival panafricain d'Alger (1969).
- Eldridge Cleaver, Black Panther (1970). On Eldridge Cleaver, Black Panther Party leader.
- Muhammad Ali: The Greatest (1974).
- Hollywood, California: A Loser's Opera' (1977).
- Grands soirs & petits matins (1978). May 1968 in the Latin Quarter of Paris.
- The Little Richard Story (1980).
- The French (1982). A documentary about the French Open tennis tournament in 1981.
- Contacts (1983). Klein comments photographs by great photographers.
- Ralentis (1984).
- Mode in France (1984). A documentary on French fashion.
- Babilée '91 (1992). A filmed ballet.
- In and Out of Fashion (1994).
- Messiah (1999). Based on Georg Friedrich Haendel's oratorio Messiah directed by Marc Minkowski.

=== Feature films ===
- Who Are You, Polly Maggoo? (1966). Satire on the fashion world (Prix Jean Vigo). With Dorothy McGowan, Delphine Seyrig, Jacques Seiler, Alice Sapritch, Philippe Noiret, Samy Frey and Roland Topor.
- Mr. Freedom (1968). Satire on American Imperialism. With Delphine Seyrig, John Abbey, Donald Pleasence, Jean-Claude Drouot and Serge Gainsbourg.
- L'anniversaire de Charlotte (1974). 8 mm short film for the Paris Film Festival. With Charlotte Levy, Roland Topor, les Gazolines and Coline Serreau.
- The Model Couple (1977). When sociology and statistics take over everyday life. With Anémone, André Dussollier, Zouc, Jacques Boudet, Eddie Constantine and Georges Descrières.

== Publications ==
- New York. London: Photography Magazine, 1956.
- Life is good and good for you in New York: Trance Witness Revels.
  - Life is good and good for you in New York: Trance Witness Revels. Éditions du Seuil, 1958.
  - New York 1954–55. Marval, 1995. New edition.
  - Life is Good & Good for You in New York Trance Witness Revels. Books on Books 5. New York: Errata Editions, 2010. ISBN 978-1-935004-08-0. Essays by Klein, Max Kozloff and Jeffrey Ladd.
  - Life is Good & Good for You in New York Trance Witness Revels. Books on Books 5. New York: Errata Editions, 2012.
- Rome. Paris: Éditions du Seuil, 1958 (Petite Planète series). ISBN 9782812312151.
- Rome: The City and Its People.
  - Rome: The City and Its People. New York: The Viking Press and London: Vista Books, 1959.
  - Rome: The City and Its People. Paris: Éditions du Seuil, 1959.
- Moscow. Crown, 1964. First edition.
- Tokyo. Crown, 1964. First edition.
- Mister Freedom. Korinsha Press, 1970. First edition.
- Close up. Thames & Hudson, 1989.
- Torino '90. Federico Motta Editore, 1990.
- Mode in & out. Seuil, 1994. ISBN 9782020216852.
- William Klein Films. Paris: Marval/Maison Europeenne De La Photographie, 1998. First edition. ISBN 9782862342634.
- Paris + Klein. Germany: Edition Braus, 2002. ISBN 9783899040197.
- MMV Romani. Fendi-Contrasto, Centre Pompidou. ISBN 9788889032817.
- William Klein, rétrospective. Marval, 2005.
- Roma + Klein. du Chêne, 2009.
- William Klein: Black and Light, Early Abstracts, 1952 – 2015. HackelBury Fine Art, 2015. ISBN 978-0957026322.

== Awards ==
- 1957: Prix Nadar for New York.
- 1967: Prix Jean Vigo for Polly Maggoo.
- 1988: The Cultural Award from the German Society for Photography (DGPh)
- 1990: Hasselblad Award.
- 1999: Centenary Medal and Honorary Fellowship (HonFRPS) from the Royal Photographic Society.
- 2012: Outstanding Contribution to Photography Award, Sony World Photography Awards.

== Exhibitions ==
- 2013: Without Compromise: The Cinema of William Klein, Museum of Arts and Design, New York. A retrospective on Klein's documentary filmmaking work.
- 2017: William Klein: Photographs and Films, C/O Berlin, Berlin
- 2022: William Klein: YES: Photographs, Paintings, Films, 1948–2013, International Center of Photography, New York, June 3 – September 15, 2022

== Collections ==
Klein's work is held in the following public collection:

- Rijksmuseum Amsterdam
