= Conzett =

Conzett is a surname. Notable people with the surname include:

- Hans Conzett (1915–1996), Swiss politician
- Jürg Conzett (born 1956), Swiss civil engineer and bridge designer
- Verena Conzett (1861–1947), Swiss magazine publisher, labor activist, and women's rights activist

== See also ==
- Conzett & Huber (publishing house), a Swiss publishing house
