= Ichthyocentaur =

Mythological aquatic creature

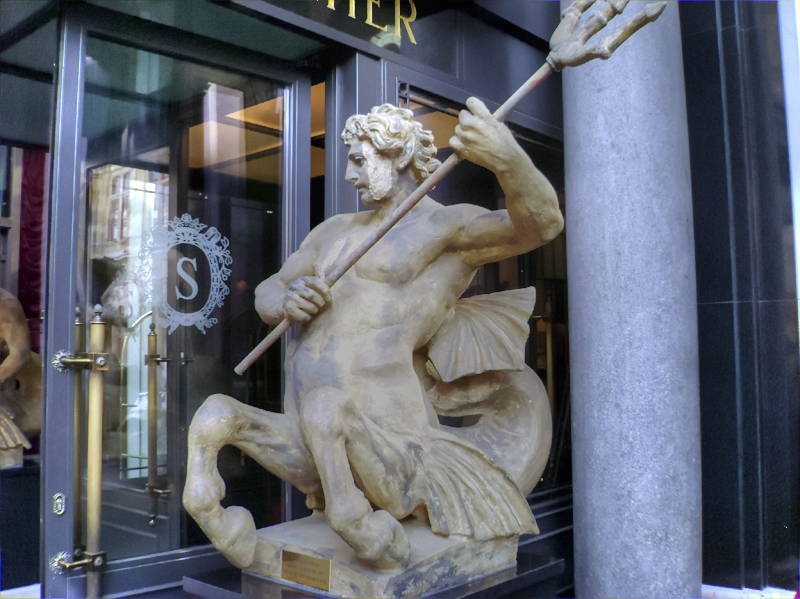
Icthyocentaur with trident. Hotel Sacher, Vienna.

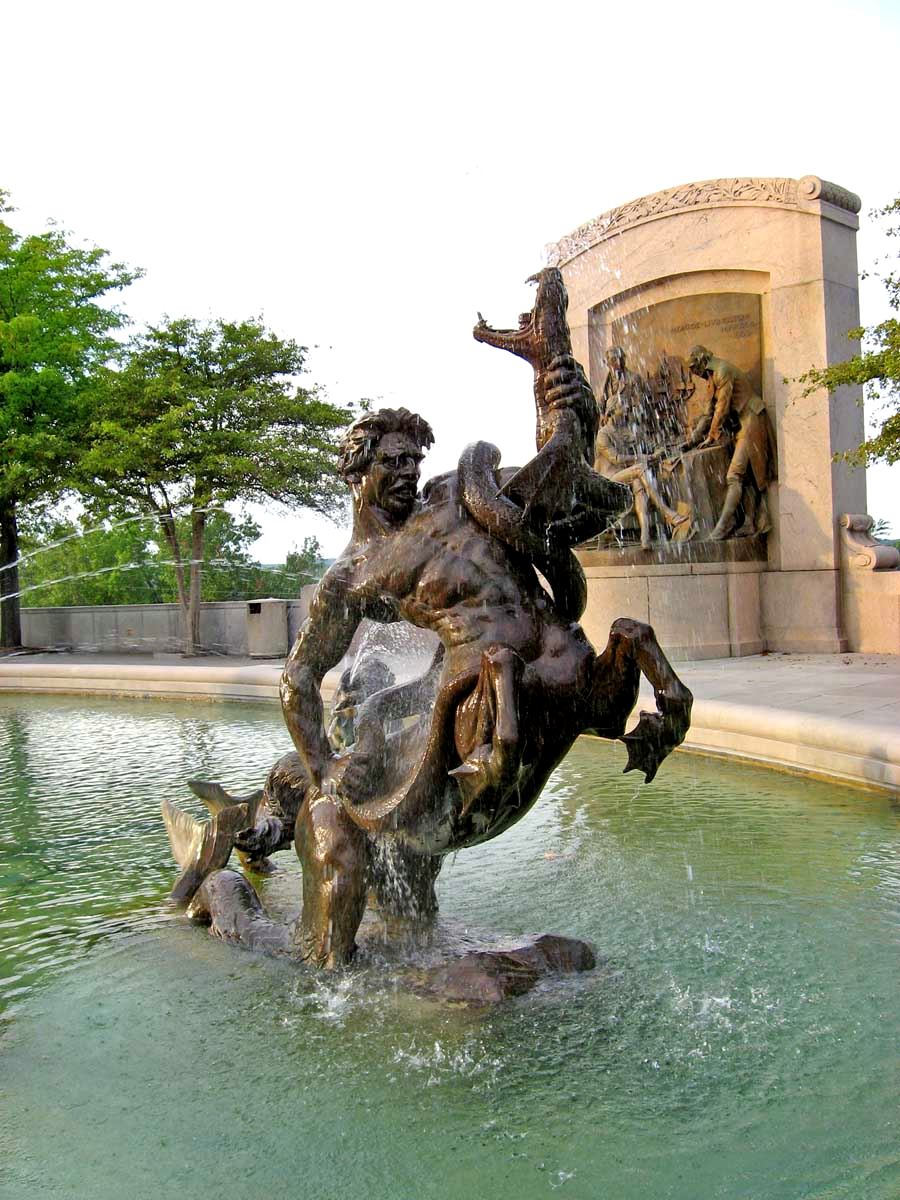
Four-legged ichthyocentaur. Fountain of the Centaurs, Missouri State Capitol.

In late Classical Greek art, an ichthyocentaur (Ancient Greek: ἰχθῠοκένταυρος, plural: ἰχθῠοκένταυροι, romanized: ikhthyokéntauros, ikhthyokéntauroi) is a centaurine sea being with the upper body of a human, the lower anterior half and forelegs of a horse, and the tailed posterior half of a fish.

The earliest example dates to the 2nd century BC, among the friezes in the Pergamon Altar. There are further examples of Aphros (Ancient Greek: Ἀφρός, romanized: Aphrós, lit. 'Sea Foam') and/or Bythos (Ancient Greek: Βυθός, romanized: Bythós, lit. 'Sea Depth/Abyss'), the personifications of sea foam and abyss respectively, depicted as ichthyocentaurs in mosaic and sculpture.

The term ichthyocentaur is of late coinage, attributable to the Byzantine writer John Tzetzes in the 12th century, and thus they are also referred as sea-centaurs.

== Nomenclature ==
=== Origin ===
"Ichthyocentaur" is not a term in the vocabulary of Classical antiquity at all. The word's earliest known use occurs in the 12th century by Ioannes Tzetzes in his commentary On Lycophron, 34 and may have been coined by him.

=== Meaning ===
Ichthyocentaur is a Triton represented as having the fore-legs of a horse, rather than just having a fish-like lower-body.

Ichthyocentaur comes from two different words, ichthyo- and centaur. Ichthyo- is an adjective stem from Greek ikhthis (ιχθύς) "fish"; centaur, from Greek kentauros (κένταυρος), a creature from classical mythology that has a man's upper body attached to a horse's body and legs.

=== Synonyms ===
The term or its equivalent in other European languages (German: Ichthyokentaur, plural: Ichthyokentauren; French: Ichthyocentaure, Ichtyocentaures) has been used in classical art commentary in the modern age, and vernacular terms such as "sea-centaur" (German: Seekentauren, Fischkentauren; French: centaures marins) have also been interchangeably applied. Henri van de Waal (1976) placed "ichthyocentaur", "centaurotriton", and "sea-centaur" in the same iconographic group or iconclass synonymous treatment of these terms are also seen in archaeological papers.

Centaur-Tritons is another name for ichthyocentaurs, noted in a 19th-century reference.

== Greek art ==
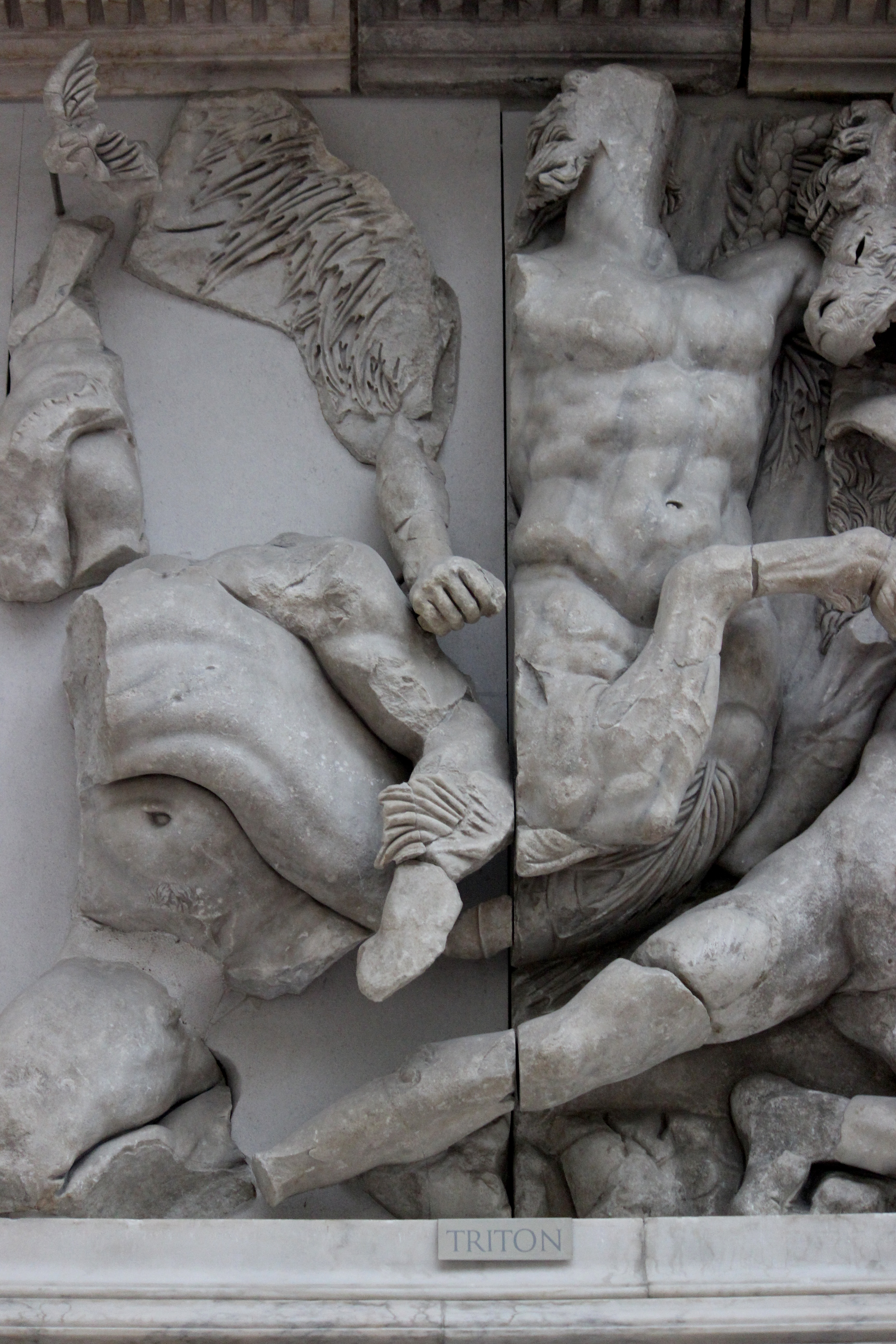
Triton on Pergamon Altar

The earliest datable depiction of an ichthyocentaur is found in the relief sculptures of the Pergamon Altar (2nd century BC), although the inscription labels the figure as a "Triton". The ichthyocentaur in this relief sculpture has wings on its back; these wings are of a peculiar type which are lined with either seaweed or sea creature parts instead of feathers.

Ichthyocentaurs are sometimes portrayed with a pair of pincered arms (similar to a lobster's clawed arms) emerging out of their heads. (Note: Cf. Oceanus conventionally depicted with crab or lobster claws ("pinces de crabe/homard") on their heads, including Zeugma. Cf. also Pauline (1972) on both "antennae (antennes)" and "pincers (pinces)" present on mosaic heads of Oceanus/sea deities.)

=== Aphros and Bythos ===
==== Zeugma mosaics ====
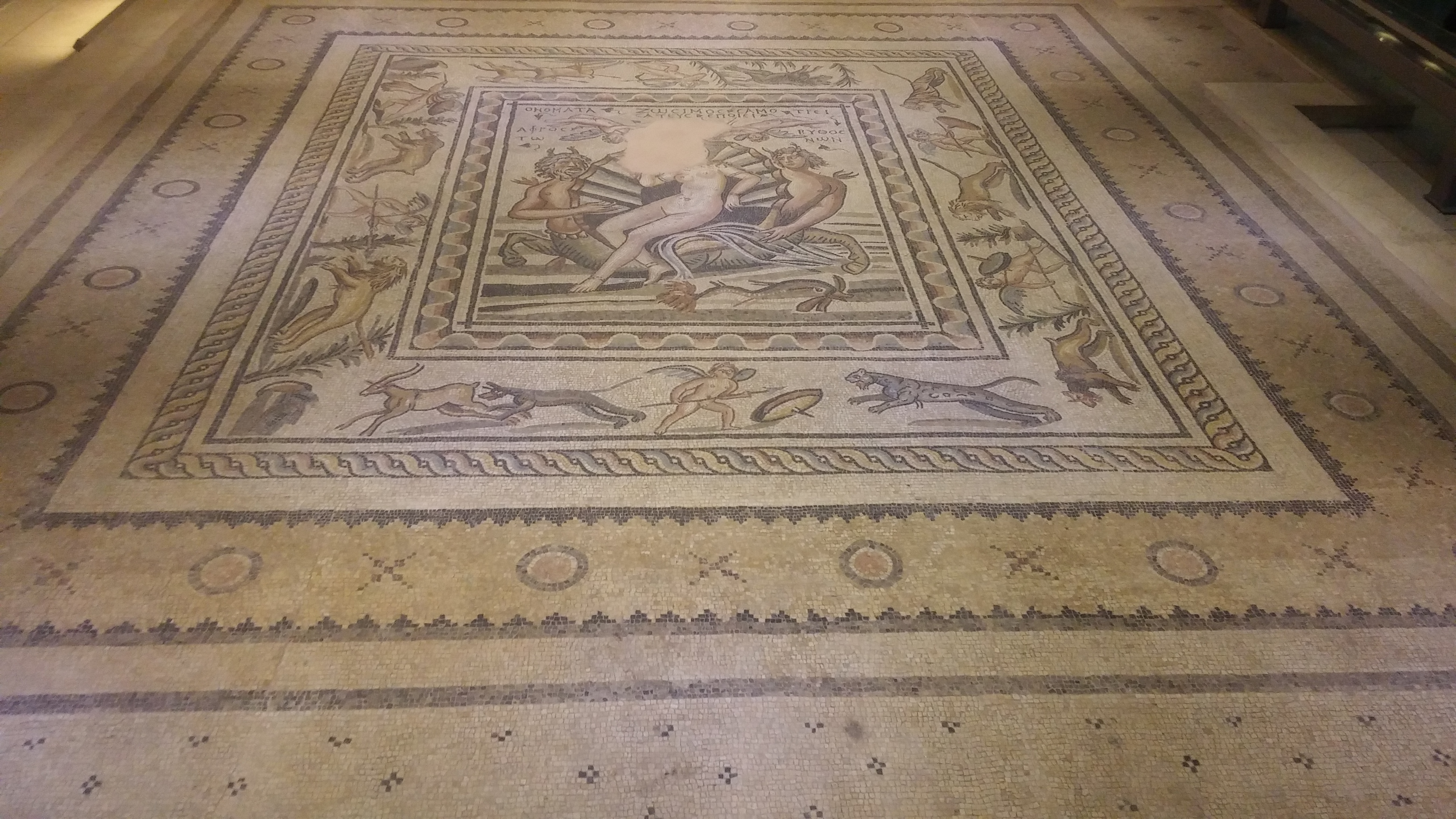
Aphrodite with Bythos and Aphros. —Zeugma Mosaic Museum

A "Birth of Venus (Aphrodite)" mosaic unearthed at Zeugma, Turkey shows Aphrodite emerging from a shell, supported by two "sea-centaurs", construed as special names for Tritons, according to a paper published by the leader of the French excavation team. The mosaics bear inscriptions, identifying the sea-centaurs as Aphros ("Sea-Foam", personified) and Bythos ("Sea-Depths").

The Aphros is shown with a pair of lobster-like appendages growing out of his head, (Note: Abadie-Reynal actually states "crowned with the antennae of lobsters (couronné d'antennes de homards)", but these terminate in what look like pincers (or pinces, used by other French scholars to describe such appendages), and differs from the straight "antennae" described on the Apamea mosaic Aphros described below.) as is Bythos (see images).

In the Zeugma mosaic, the elder-looking triton is labeled Aphros and the youthful-looking one is called Bythos, which is contrary to convention seen in other examples.

This mosaic dates to the 3rd century CE, and is now part of the Gaziantep Museum of Archaeology's collection, now housed in the annex named the Zeugma Mosaic Museum.

==== Apamea, Paphos and others ====
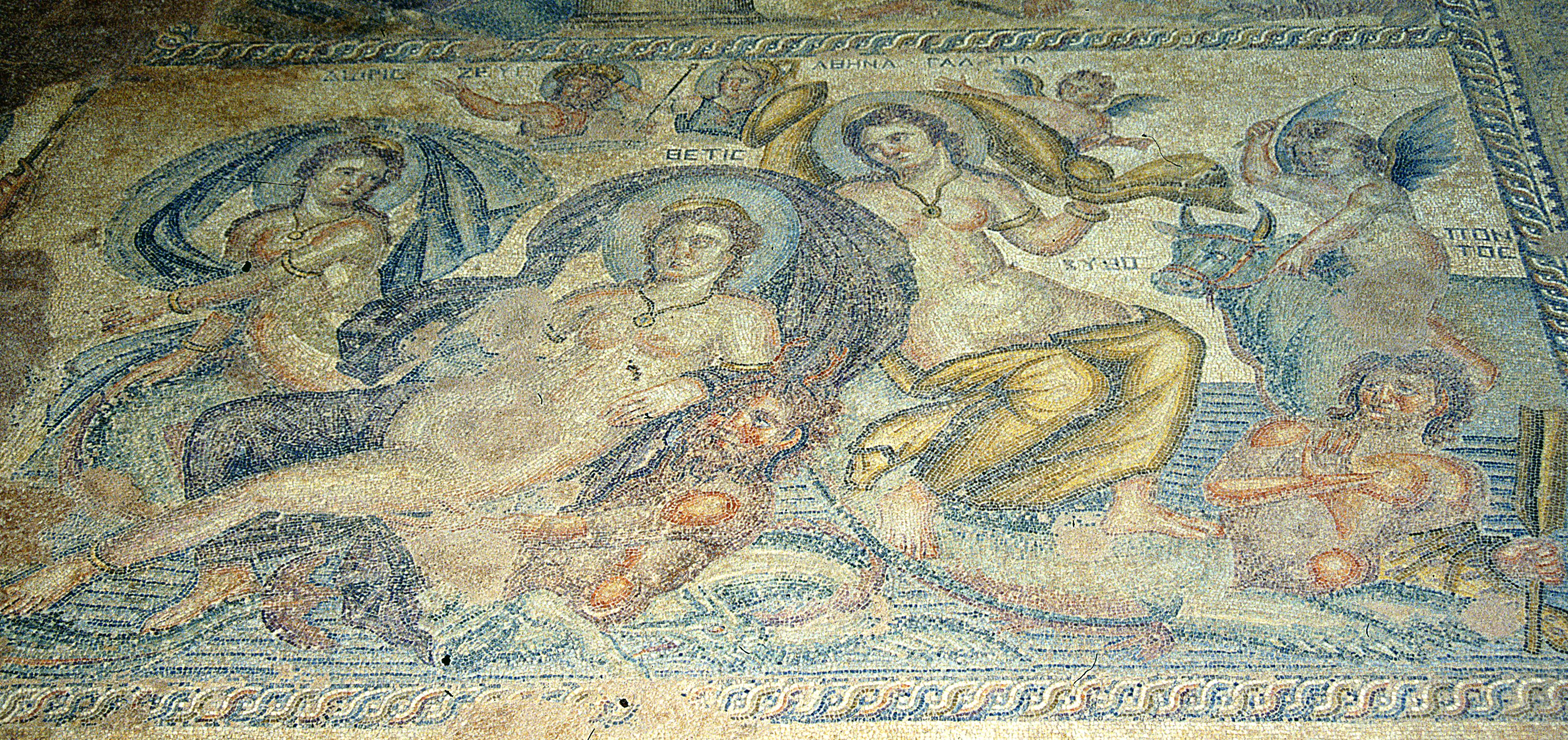
Thetis (center), Bythos (center bottom). —Paphos Archeological Park mosaic, "Beauty contest between Cassiopeia and the Nereids"

In the marine procession mosaic found underneath a cathedral at Apamea, Syria (c. 362–363 CE), there is an Aphros in ichthyocentaur form. This Aphros (identified by inscription) is depicted as a youthful triton with lobster-like antennae on its head and hair of seaweed. Bythos also appears in the same group; he evidently appears old-aged and the commentator remarks this is none other than the "Old Man of the Sea".

The Paphos mosaic depicts Bythos alone carrying the nereid Thetis along with two other nereids, Doris and Galateia.

The two sea gods also appear in a pair of matching sculptures (belonging to the Louvre and Vatican Museums) depicting them carrying silen companions of the god Dionysus after his company was driven into the sea by King Lycurgus of Thrace.

==== Aphros in glosses ====
Aphros is glossed as a king of Ancient Libya and the progenitor of the Aphroi (or Carthaginians) according to the entry in the Byzantine lexicon, the Suda. A mosaic uncovered in Tunisia confirms this belief; it depicts a pair of African sea gods swimming alongside Poseidon's chariot—one is the ichthyocentaur Aphros and the other a twin-tailed Triton, god of the Libyan Lake Tritonis.

The Suda also states this Aphros was the son of Cronos and Philyra. This matches the parentage of the centaur Chiron, who was the son of the Titan Cronos and the nymph Philyra (Bibliotheke of Pseudo-Apollodorus 1.2) from which it might be deduced this Aphros and Chiron were siblings. Aphros was perhaps regarded as Aphrodite's foster-father, given their similarity in names.

=== Other examples ===
The monochrome mosaic Ishthmia (2nd century CE or later), included an ichthyocentaur-form Triton on the upper panel and a winged-form Triton on the lower; both these beardless Tritons were depicted with a pair of what look like crustacean pincers growing out of their heads.

A pair of marine thiasos fresco fragments in Herculaneum have been described, such that in one fragment, are two tritons, one of them an ichthyocentaur. The ichthyocentaur here is beardless, and bears a ribboned trident. A pair of sea crayfish (lobster) feet or pincers sprout from each triton's head. (Note: The second triton, bearded, has twin fish-tails, and bears an oar.) In the second fragment, a youthful ichthyocentaur proceeds ahead of a mounted Venus marina; the ichthyocentaur holds two objects difficult to identify.

== Literary examples ==
One late literary example that has been noted is the poem by Claudian (d. 404), the Epithalamium for the wedding of Honorius and Maria, in which Venus rides Triton on her back as her whole procession heads for the wedding. Here Triton is described as follows "The dread monster uprose from the abyss; his billowing hair swept his shoulders; hoofs of cloven horn grown round with bristles sprang from where his fishy tail joined his man's body". Wilhelm Heinrich Roscher observed that this Triton (with cloven hooves) is being described as an ichthyocentaur subtype with a bull's forelegs.

== Renaissance period ==
Conrad Gessner's "sea-satyr" or "sea-Pan" was also described as an "ichthyocentaur" or "sea-devil" in his chapter on tritons in his Historia animalium IV (1558). In the German translated edition, this creature is called "Meerteuffel [sic]" or "sea devil".

This "marine daemon" (German: Meerteufel), with other names such as "sea Pan monster", "monstrous sea satyr" or "centaur-fish" has also been used on heraldic devices.

== See also ==
- Hippocampus (mythology)
- Onocentaur
- Pisces (astrology)
