= Antonio Ordóñez Plaja =

Chairman of UNICEF
- In office 1976–1977
- Preceded by: Hans Conzett
- Succeeded by: Ferdinand Oyono

Personal details
- Born: 1919 Barcelona
- Died: 2012 (aged 92–93) Bogotá

Antonio Ordóñez Plaja (1919–2012) was a Colombian surgeon, sociologist, politician and United Nations official. He served as Minister of Public Health in the Government of Colombia from 1966 to 1970 and as Chairman of UNICEF at the international level from 1976 to 1977.

He was a Professor of Anatomy and Physiology and later of Interdisciplinary Studies at the Pontificia Universidad Javeriana. He also held visiting professorships at Yale University and the Harvard School of Public Health.
