= Iconclass =

Classification for visual elements in artworks

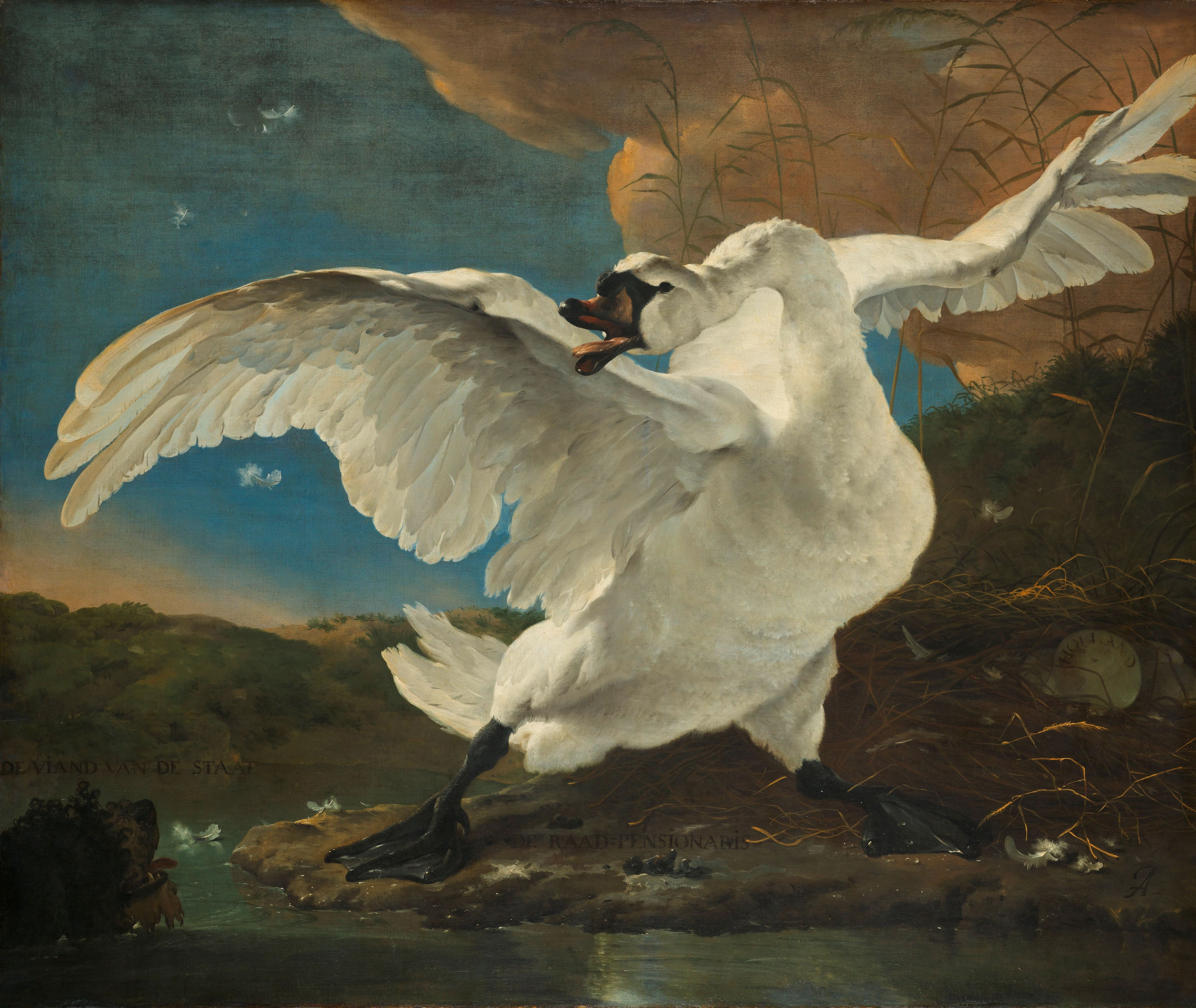
The Threatened Swan, c. 1650, Jan Asselijn, Rijksmuseum, Amsterdam, Classed as: 45A10 = 'symbols, allegories of war; 'Guerra' (Ripa)' 25F36(SWAN) = 'water-birds' 34B11 = 'dog' 41C642 = 'eggs, egg-dishes'

Iconclass is a specialized library classification designed for classifying the subjects and content of images in art (their iconography). It was originally conceived by the Dutch art historian Henri van de Waal in the 1970s, and was further developed by a group of scholars after his death.

It is one of the largest classification systems for cultural content and probably the largest for visual arts content. Initially designed for historical imagery, it is now also used to create subject access to texts and to classify a wide range of images, including modern photography. At the moment it contains over 28,000 unique concepts (classification types) and has an entry vocabulary of 14,000 keywords. Like the Dewey Decimal Classification and Universal Decimal Classification systems, it has 10 main "divisions" or points of entry:

- 0 Abstract, Non-representational Art
- 1 Religion and Magic
- 2 Nature
- 3 Human being, Man in general
- 4 Society, Civilization, Culture
- 5 Abstract Ideas and Concepts
- 6 History
- 7 Bible
- 8 Literature
- 9 Classical Mythology and Ancient History

Each division has 9 or 10 subdivisions, and so on. It can be consulted with the help of the freely available Iconclass 2100 browser. Iconclass was developed in the Netherlands as a standard classification for recording collections, with the idea of assembling huge databases that will allow the retrieval of images featuring particular details, subjects or other common factors. It was developed in the 1970s and was loosely based on the Dewey Decimal System because it was meant to be used in art library card catalogs.

The content of Iconclass is maintained by the Henri van de Waal Foundation.

== Usage in data records ==
The iconclass code represents a concept and objects can be assigned a code indicating that the object depicts that concept. For example, the iconclass code "71H7131" is for the subject of "Bathsheba (alone) with David's letter". The code is built from "7" for bible, "71" for "Old Testament", "71H" the "story of David", "71H7" for "David and Bathsheba", "71H71" for "David observing Bathsheba bathing", "71H713" for "Bathsheba receiving a letter from David" and "71H7131" for "Bathsheba alone with David's letter"

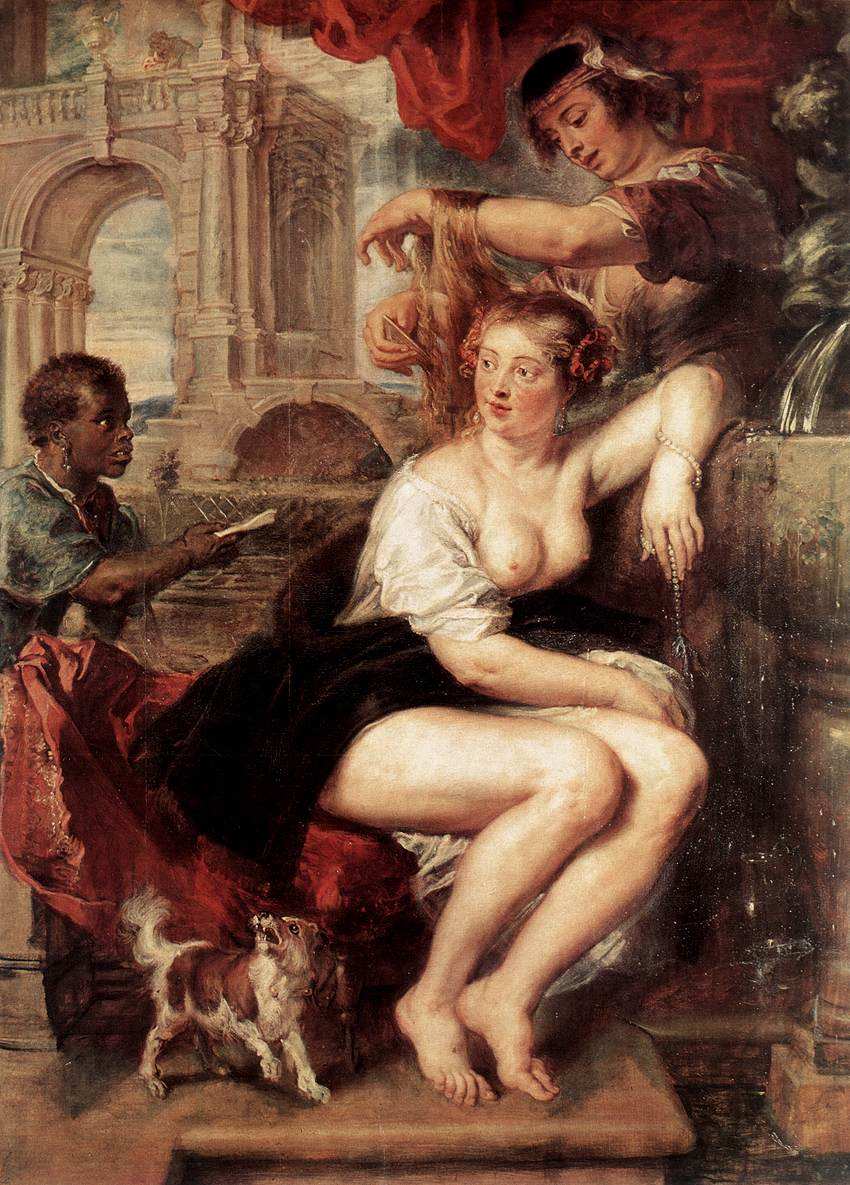
71H713

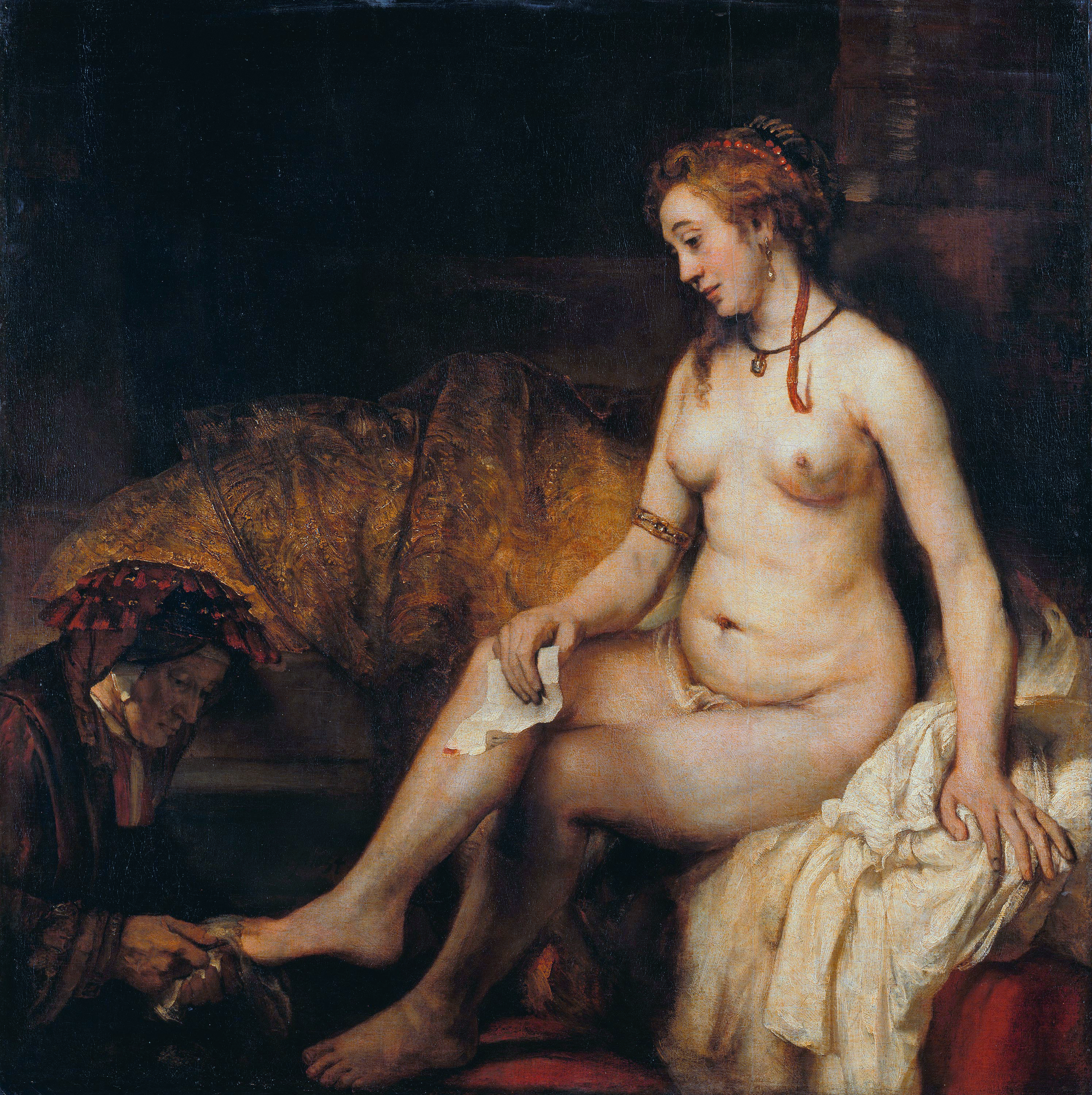
71H7131

=== Depicting the iconclass concept ===
To see all images in the RKDimages database that depict "Bathsheba receiving a letter from David", the associated iconclass code 71H713 can be used as a special search term. On selecting one of these paintings and viewing its record in RKDimages, the code 71H713 can be seen under two sections; under the section for "subject" and under the section for "suggested searches".

==== More examples ====
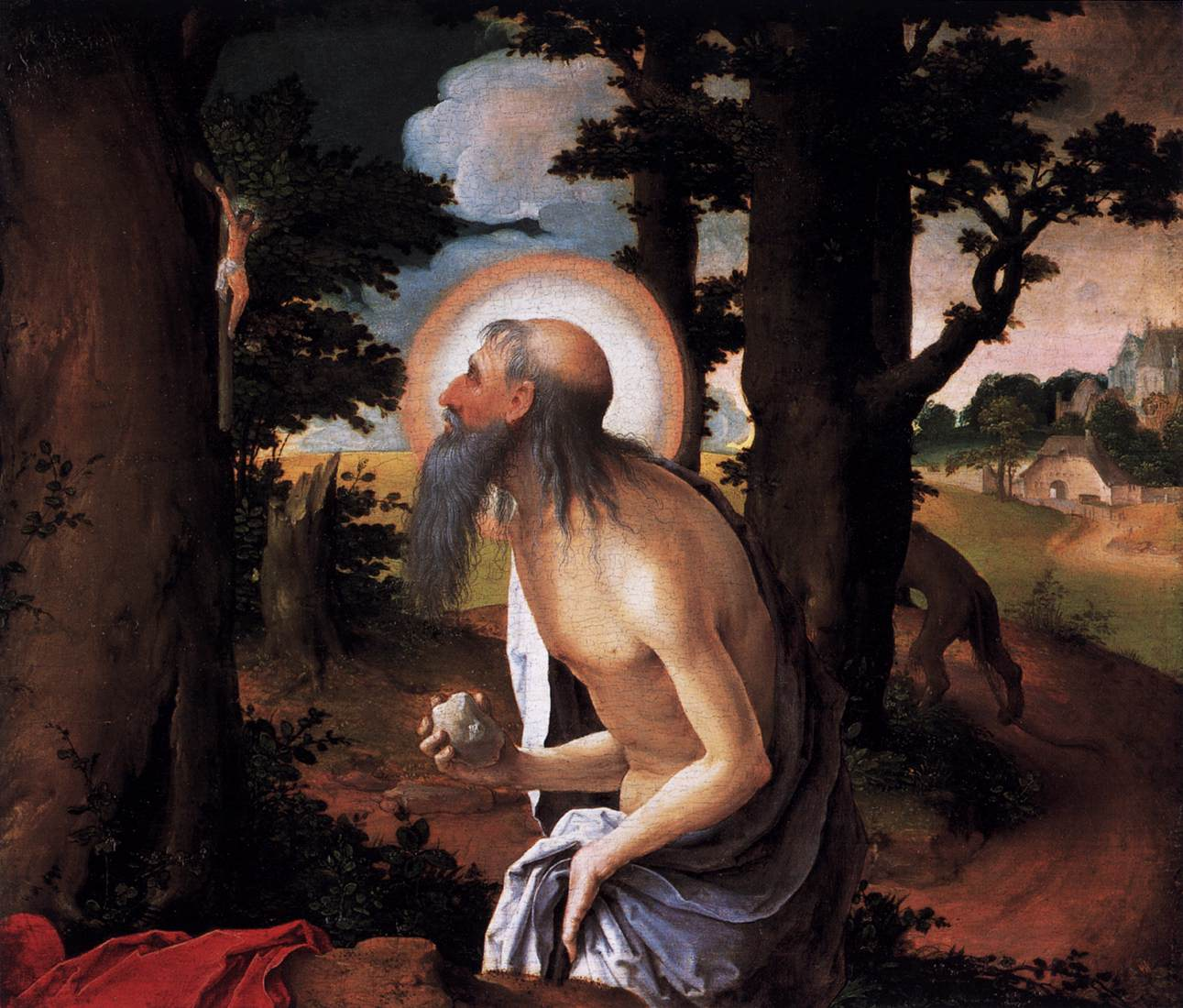
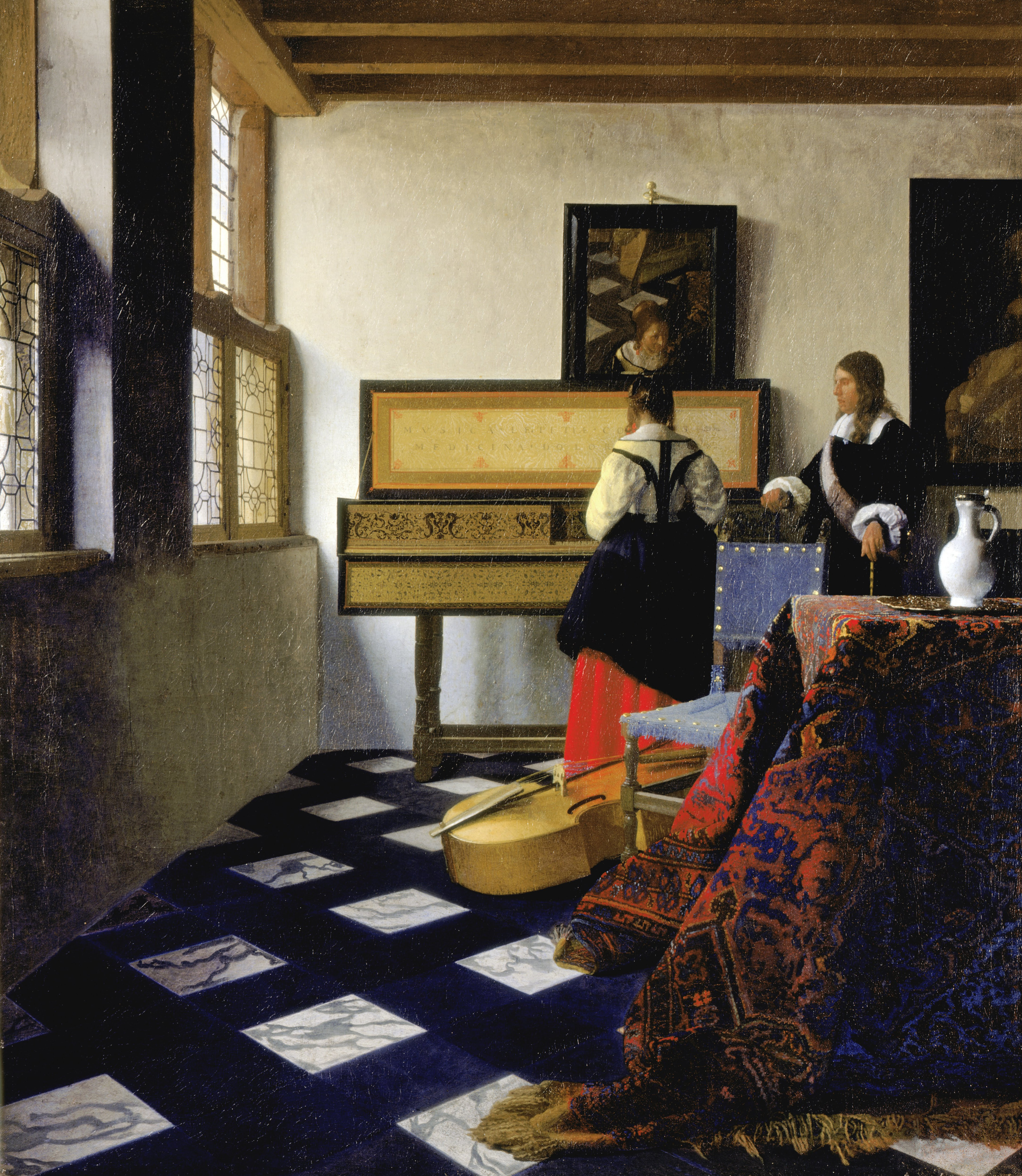
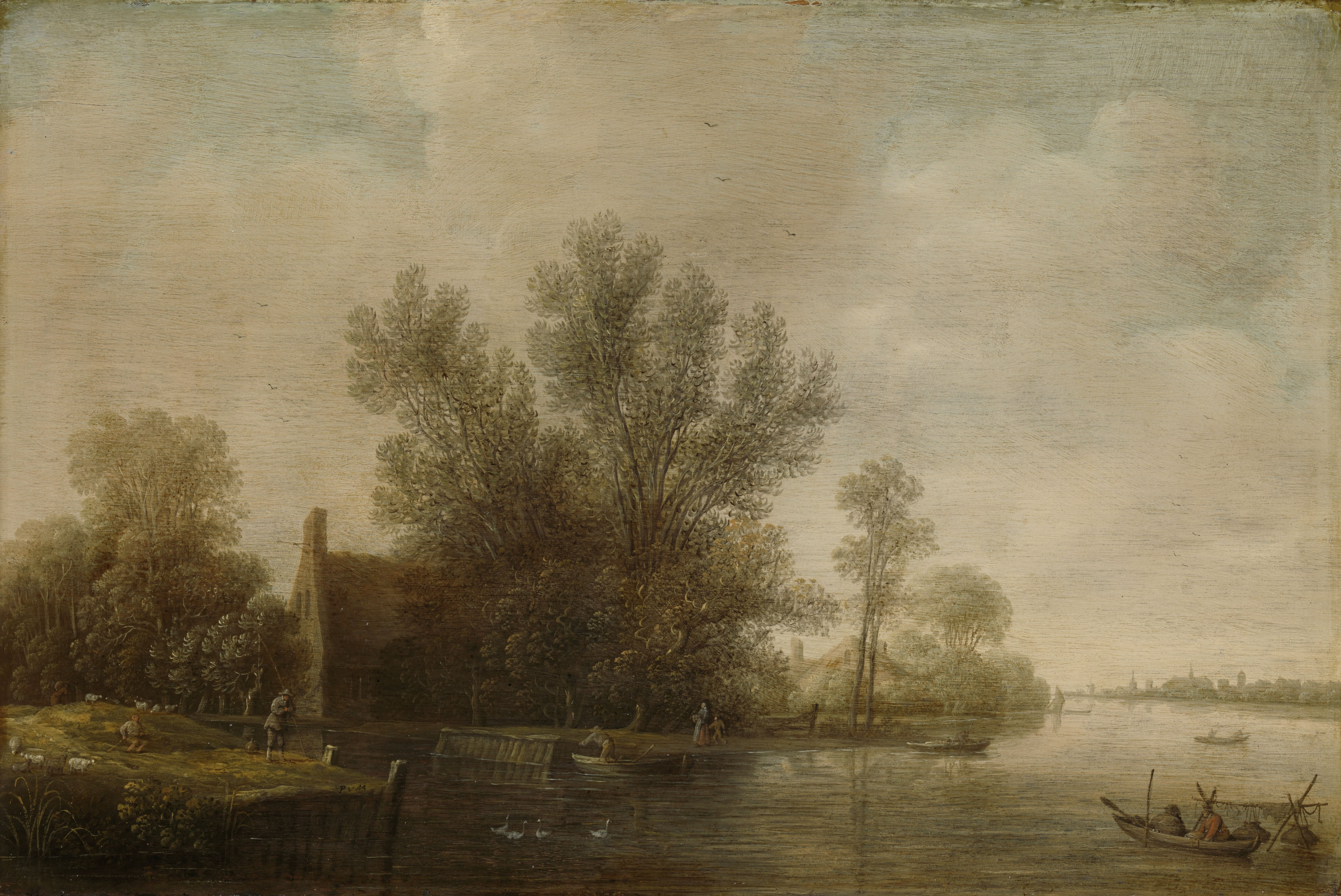
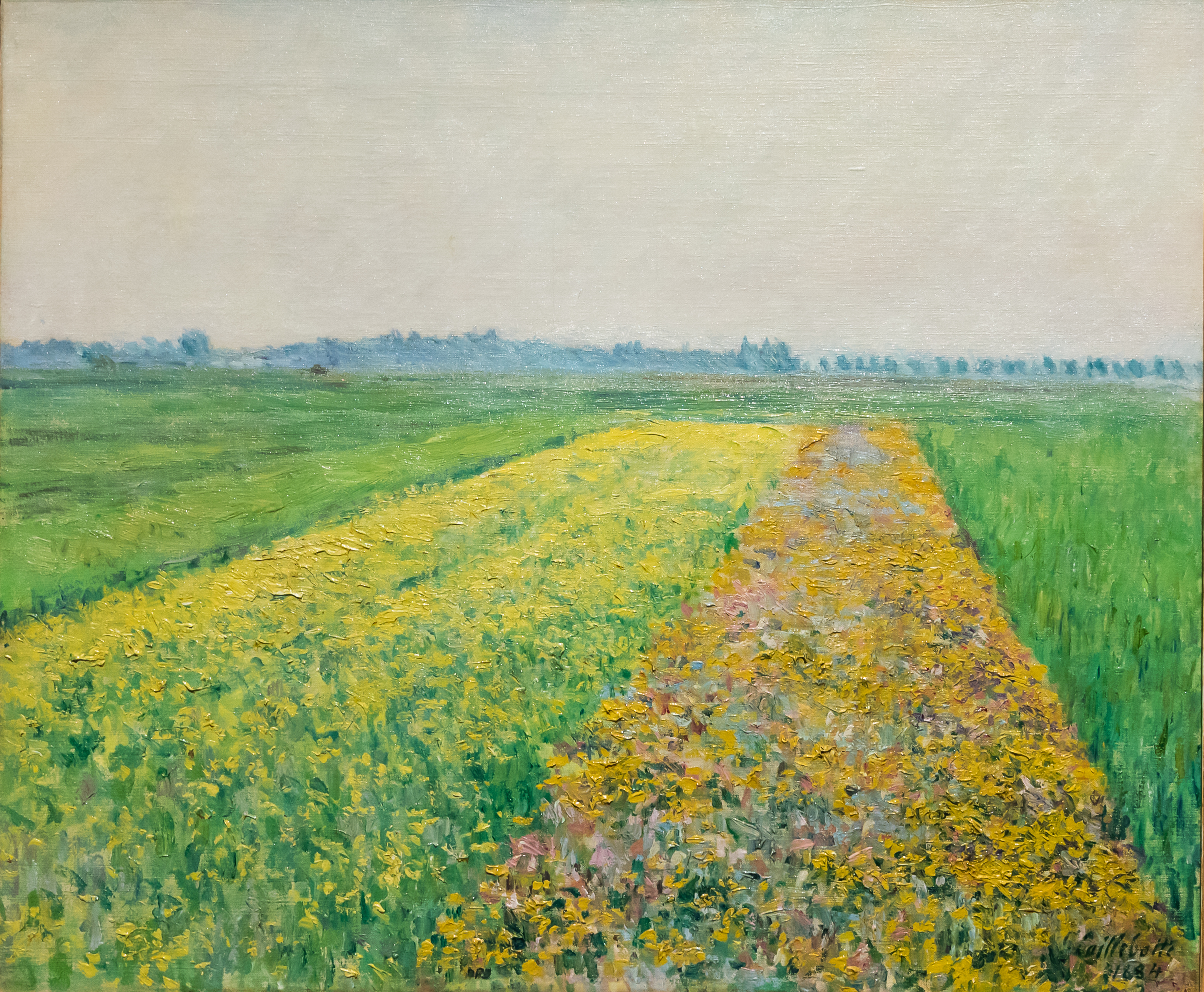
Image		Iconclass-code with title
	St. Jerome in the Desert, c. 1520, workshop of Lucas van Leyden, Gemäldegalerie Berlin	11H(JEROME)36 = 'St. Jerome as penitent in the desert, half naked, kneeling before a crucifix and holding a stone in his hand to beat his breast; a skull (and other 'Vanitas' symbols), sometimes a scorpion and a snake beside him'
	The Music Lesson, c. 1662–1664, by Johannes Vermeer, Royal Collection	48C7211 = 'musician training pupils, music-lesson' 48C7523 = 'one person playing keyboard instrument' 48C7331 = 'spinet, virginal' 48C7315(VIOLA DA GAMBA) = 'viola da gamba (sizes: pardessus de viole, treble, alto, tenor, bass, and contrabass (violone))'
	River Landscape, c. 1640, by Pieter Jansz. van Asch, Rijksmuseum, Amsterdam	25H2 = 'landscapes with waters, waterscapes, seascapes (in the temperate zone)'
	The Yellow Fields at Gennevilliers, 1884, by Gustave Caillebotte, Wallraf-Richartz-Museum, Cologne	25H16 = 'plain' 61D(GENNEVILLIERS) = 'geographical names of countries, regions, mountains, rivers, etc.'

=== The iconclass concept as a subject ===
Everyone with an account can add to the iconclass hierarchy. Some of these hierarchies are quite detailed, such as for stories of the Old Testament that were popular in the arts during the 17th-century. The problems of using iconclass codes for concepts is that they are a bit too precise. In the previous search example for 71H713 in the RKDimages database, the painting record for Rembrandt's Bathsheba in the Louvre was excluded from the search, because the iconclass code assigned to that painting in the RKDimages database is not 71H713, but 71H7131, and searching for that code will result in other images to be returned.

== Usage by organizations ==
A number of collections of different types have been classified using Iconclass, notably many types of old master print, the collections of the Gemäldegalerie, Berlin and the German Marburger Index. These can be matched to each other through the iconclass "hierarchy of somethings" to the current classification structure of the holder's collection. Completed iconclass projects are available, often online, but also published on DVD. Ideally however, iconclass coding is never finished, as it is also possible to keep adding codes to the system to identify more concepts. The system can also be used outside pure art history, though it is most often used in museum websites.
