= Onocentaur =

Legendary creature from Ancient folklore and Medieval bestiaries

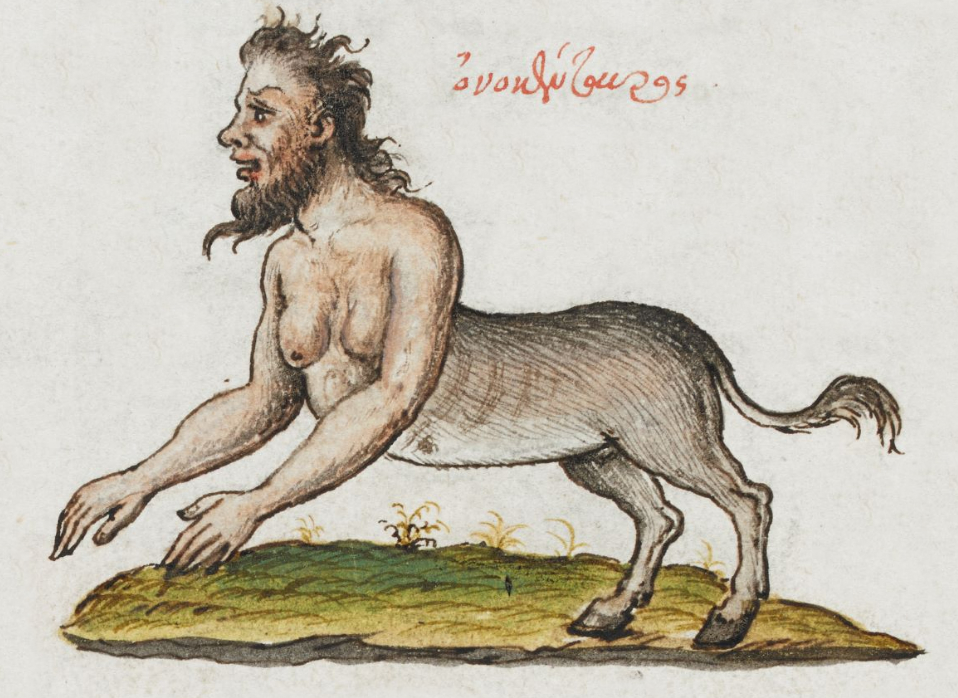
Onocentaur, Manuel Philes, De animalium proprietate

The onocentaur (Latin: onocentaurus, from Ancient Greek: Ὀνοκένταυρος, romanized: Onokéntauros, lit. 'donkey centaur') is a legendary creature from ancient folklore and medieval bestiaries.

== Description ==
The onocentaur is similar to the centaur, but part-human part-donkey. However, unlike a centaur, which is portrayed with four legs, the onocentaur is often portrayed with only two legs, and some artwork depicts it with no front legs on the donkey part of its body. According to some medieval authors, the onocentaur instead possessed the head of a donkey and the body of a man.

The first known mention was in the reign of Ptolemy II Philadelphus by an officer named Pythagoras, as quoted by Claudius Aelianus in De Natura Animalium. Aelian as well uses the term onokentaura for the description of the female form of the creature. He described the onocentaur: "its body resembles that of an ass, its colour is ashen but inclines to white beneath the flanks. It has a human chest with teats and a human face surrounded by thick hair. It may use its arms to seize and hold things but also to run. It has a violent temper and does not endure capture."

The Life of Antony written by Athanasius of Alexandria mentions a "beast like a man to the thighs but having legs and feet like those of an ass", though it does not use the term onocentaur.

== In the biblical corpus ==
As should be verifiable using a suitable concordance to the Bible, the Septuagint translators used the word onokentauros or ("onocentaur") four times in the Book of Isaiah.

Once it is used without any corresponding Hebrew word, in verse 34.11. Twice, in verses 13:22 ("and onocentaurs will settle there and hedgehogs will make nests in their homes. It comes quickly and does not delay") and 34:14 ("and the spirits will meet with the onocentaurs and howl one to another, and the onocentaurs will stop because they have found rest") to translate some sort of "island beast(s)" called ’íy (אִי; pl. ’íyyîm אִיִּים) in the original Hebrew, possibly jackal or hyena. The second instance in the same verse (Is. 34:14) translates lîlîṯ (לִילִית), probably a female demon.

Jerome's translation of the Septuagint and Vetus Latina versions into the Late Latin standard version, the Vulgate, preserved this interpretation. John Wycliffe's early English-language translation of the Bible did not use the word "onocentaur", but instead glossed the term as: "wondurful beestis, lijk men in the hiyere part and lijk assis in the nethir part". The later King James Version translates the word as "satyr".

== See also ==
- Ichthyocentaur
