= Henri van de Waal =

Henri (Hans) van de Waal
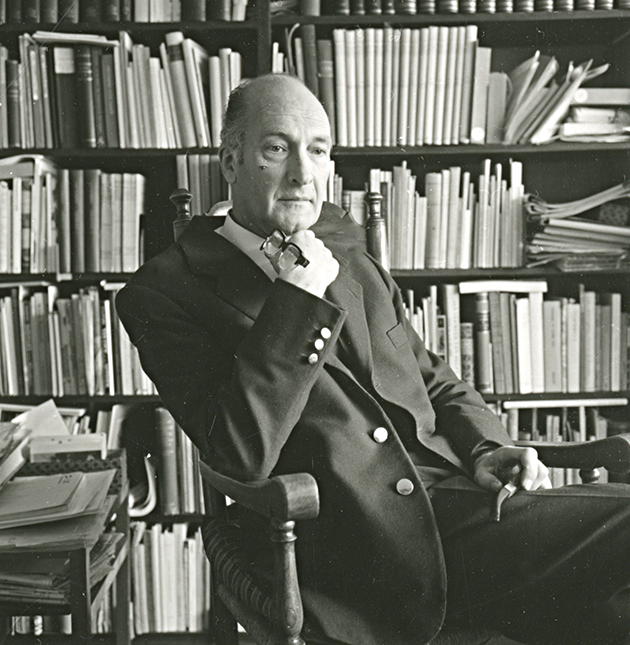
- Born: 3 March 1910; Rotterdam, Netherlands
- Died: 7 May 1972 (aged 62); Leiden, Netherlands

Henri (Hans) van de Waal (3 March 1910 – 7 May 1972) was a Dutch writer and art historian known for developing Iconclass.

Van de Waal was born in Rotterdam. In 1934 he finished his education as an art historian in Leiden with a monography on Jan van Goyen. He accepted a position at the National Print Cabinet in The Hague, where he began work on a German concept of image-based historical research, which due to the special circumstances of the interbellum period was drastically reduced. He eventually finished his PhD thesis 12 July 1940, cum laude, on the patriotic subject of Zeventiende eeuwsche uitbeeldingen van den Bataafschen Opstand (17th-century images of the Batavian Revolt). Four months later he was dismissed as part of the actions by the German occupational forces against Jews.

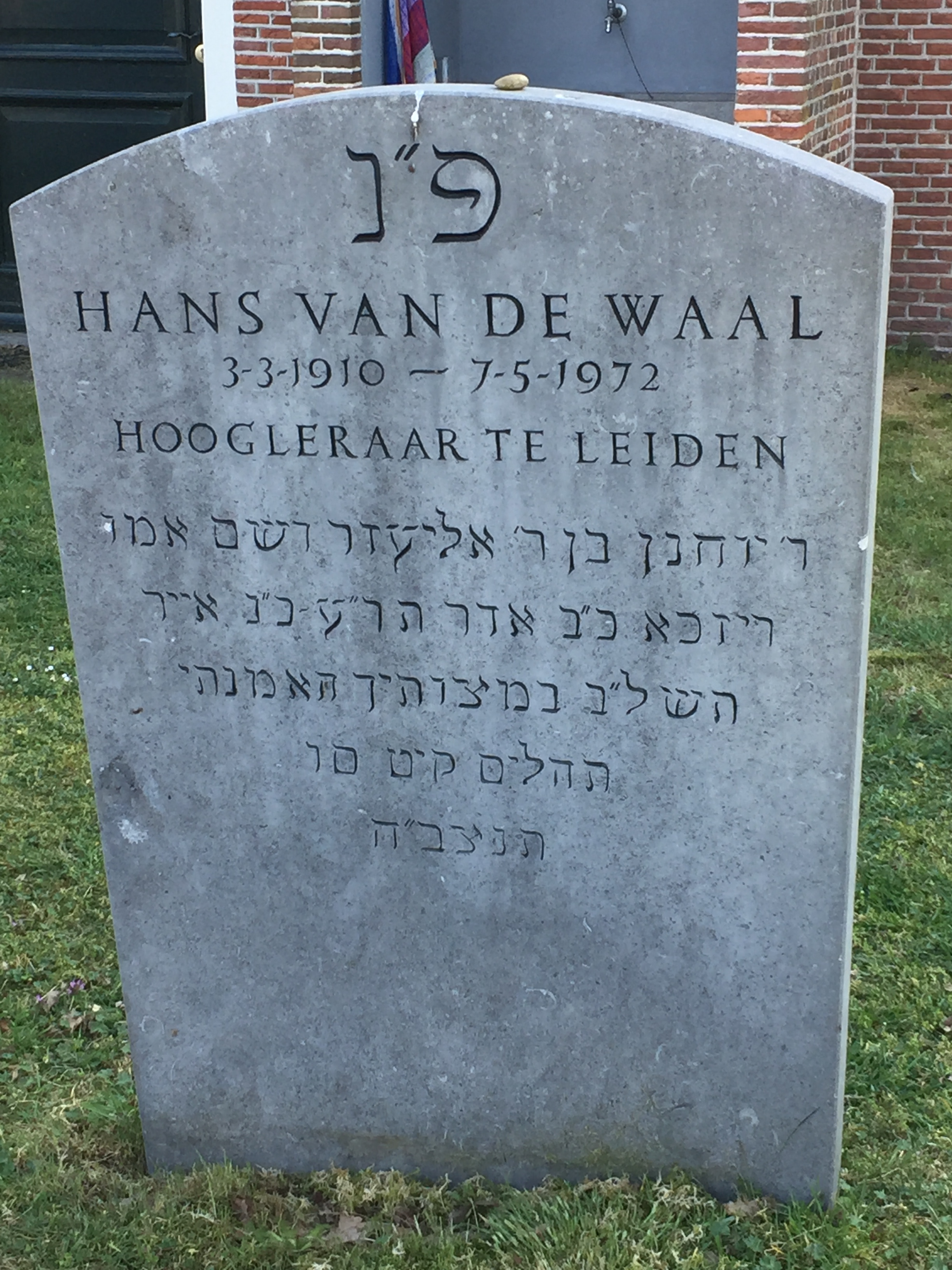
Grave of Hans van de Waal in Katwijk

Soon after being released from captivity in Westerbork in 1945, he took up work as an assistant professor in Leiden, but was appointed a full professorship in art history the same December. In 1946 he presented his ideas about mapping the iconography of art history with "beeld-leer", an image-based concept of recording form, function and content with one code. He remained professor and director of the print cabinet until his death resulting from kidney damage contracted during a case of scarlet fever he had while in Westerbork.

Van de Waal was elected a member of the Royal Netherlands Academy of Arts and Sciences in 1957.

His "beeld-leer" resulted in the D.I.A.L. (Decimal Index of the Art of the Low Countries) based on the Dewey Decimal System, and later called Iconclass.

== Episodes ==
For an image titled View of the Heiligewegspoort (Heiligeweg gate) attributed to Lievens, van de Waal had pointed out that its creator could be Jan Andrea Lievens, or the son of the attributed. Werner Sumowski took that suggestion into account and in editing Lievens's catalogue, the picture in question was not included. Among the same collection presently at Leiden University, van de Waal also noted "Man arriving in a village, a sheep on his shoulders, Old Testament scene?" could be a copy after Van Bronckhorst, which is now attributed to Jan Gerritsz van Bronckhorst.

Van de Waal nominated Albertus Welcker for an honorary doctorate in arts and philosophy in 1955, as the year fell on the "Rembrandt Year", recognising Welcker's endeavour and contribution on building a collection of Dutch paintings. Jaap Hillenius exchanged letters with Van de Waal, and one such is among the collection of the Library of Leiden University with a drawing of a standing man on the wrong side.

== Works ==
- Nieuwe bijzonderheden over Carel van Mander's Haarlemschen tijd [New details about Carel van Mander's Haarlem era]. Oud-Holland, vol.54, pp. 21–23, 1937. (in Dutch) ISSN 0030-672X, OCLC 888465607
- ''Zeventiende eeuwsche uitbeeldingen van den Bataafschen opstand'' [Seventeenth century representations of the Batavian revolt]. [S.l. : s.n.], 1940. Thesis/dissertation : Manuscript, Leiden. (in Dutch)
- Monograph on Jan van Goyen Palet serie, 16. Amsterdam : Becht, 1941. (in Dutch) OCLC 310665105
- De Staalmeesters van Rembrandt [The Steel Masters of Rembrandt]. Kunstvoordrachten, 1947/ 1951. Antwerp Royal Museum of Fine Arts, 1950. OCLC 1112977761
- Drie eeuwen vaderlandsche geschied-uitbeelding, 1500-1800 : een iconologische studie [Three centuries of patriotic history depicted, 1500-1800: an iconological study]. Nyhoff, 1952. (in Dutch and English) OCLC 92264574
- Some principles of a general iconographical classification. Proceedings of the XVIIth International Congress on the History of Art, pp. 601–606, 1955. OCLC 888465740
- The iconological background of Rembrandt's Civilis. Konsthistorisk tidskrift, Vol. 25, 1/2, pp. 11–25. Konsthistoriska Sällskapet, 1956. ISSN 0023-3609, OCLC 888465736
- Decimal index to the art of the Low Countries : D.I.A.L. : alphabetical subject index, The Hague : Netherlands Institute for Art History, 1961.
- Henri van de Waal; et al. Foto's : Prentenkabinet Leiden [Photos: Leiden Print Room]. TCHAF, jrg. 5 (1968) Kerst. Leiden : Technical/Administrative Staff of Leiden University, 1968. OCLC 67044345
- Kersen-Halbertsma (1973). Icones Leidenses : de portretverzameling van de Rijksuniversiteit te Leiden / samengest. in opdracht van de Stichting Historische Commissie voor de Leidse Universiteit. "Collection Catalogues of the Holdings of Leiden University Libraries (ubl091)". Inventory conducted by; Kersen-Halbertsma, Maria F. van; Lash, W.F.; Koornwinder-Wijntjes, Th.M.; Scheers, K.A.C.; Ekkart, R.E.O.; van de Waal, Henri. - Leiden : University Press. (in Dutch)
- Iconclass : an iconographic classification system / System / H. van de Waal 2-3 / compl. and ed. by L.D. Couprie with R.H. Fuchs; E. Tholen. Royal Dutch Academy of Sciences, 1974. ISBN 9780720483000, OCLC 832005299

=== Letters ===
- Henri van de Waal; Albert Verwey. Brief van Henri van de Waal aan Albert Verwey (1865-1937) UB: HSS-mag.: XLI B 17644. (in Dutch) Rotterdam, 1932-05-11. OCLC 848815337
