= Verena Conzett =

Swiss publisher and labor activist (1861–1947)

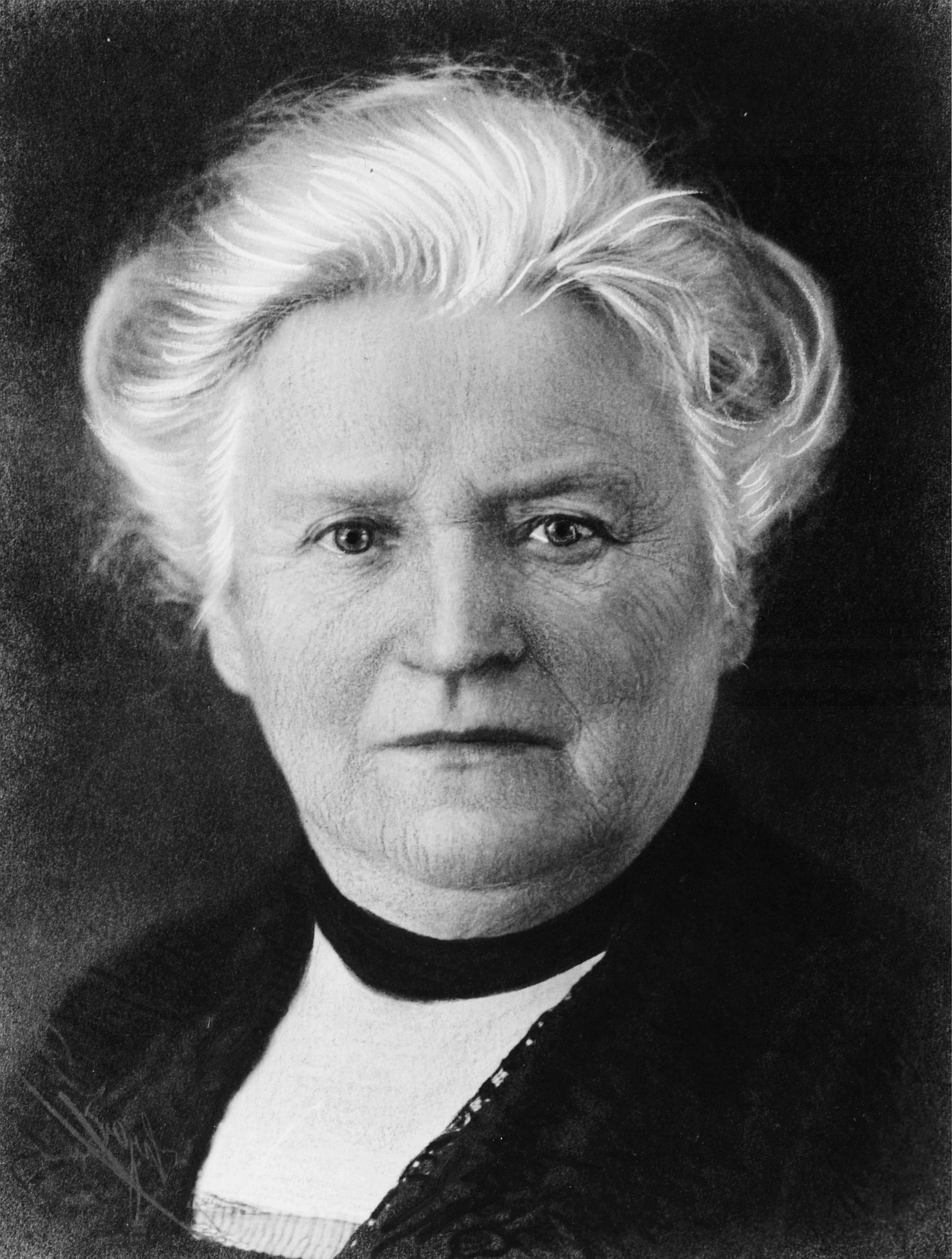
- Born: Verena Knecht; 28 November 1861; Zürich, Switzerland
- Died: 14 November 1947 (aged 85); Kilchberg, Switzerland
- Other name: Verena Conzett-Knecht
- Political party: Social Democratic Party of Switzerland
- Spouse: Conrad Conzett (m. 1883–1897)

Verena Conzett (28 November 1861 – 14 November 1947) was a Swiss magazine publisher, labor activist, and women's rights activist. She became the first president of the Swiss Women Workers' Union in 1890. Her own experience as a child factory worker led to her lifelong advocacy for insurance protection and shorter working hours. Following the death of her husband in 1897, Conzett took over his print shop, narrowly escaping bankruptcy. A decade later, she acquired a Linotype typesetting machine and expanded the business into the Conzett & Huber publishing house. In 1908, Conzett launched the illustrated magazine In freien Stunden, and established herself as a successful entrepreneur. Subscriptions to the magazine included accident insurance, which had not yet been mandated by law in Switzerland. Her autobiography, Erstrebtes und Erlebtes, was first published in 1929. Now in its third edition, it has been called "the longest and most literate" of the autobiographies of late 19th-century working-class women written in German. Verena-Conzett-Strasse in Zürich is named after her.

== Early life and education ==
She was born Verena Knecht on 28 November 1861 in Zürich. Her parents were Johannes and Barbara Knecht (née Mathis). She was the third of four sisters. Her mother sewed men's shirts at home. Her father was a supervisor in a paper factory, but became unable to work due to the onset of blindness. At the age of thirteen, Verena found a job at a dye works, to help support the family. She had completed six years of primary school. While working, she attended part-time classes (Ergänzungsunterricht) two mornings a week. One of her teachers encouraged her to apply for a scholarship to attend secondary school, but her father refused to accept charity.

== Early career ==
Between the ages of thirteen and sixteen, Knecht worked in a succession of jobs in the textile industry. In the spring of 1874, she worked at the Meier dye works, where she assisted with reeling and dying wool. As one of the youngest workers, she was the first to be laid off in winter, when the supply of wool dropped.

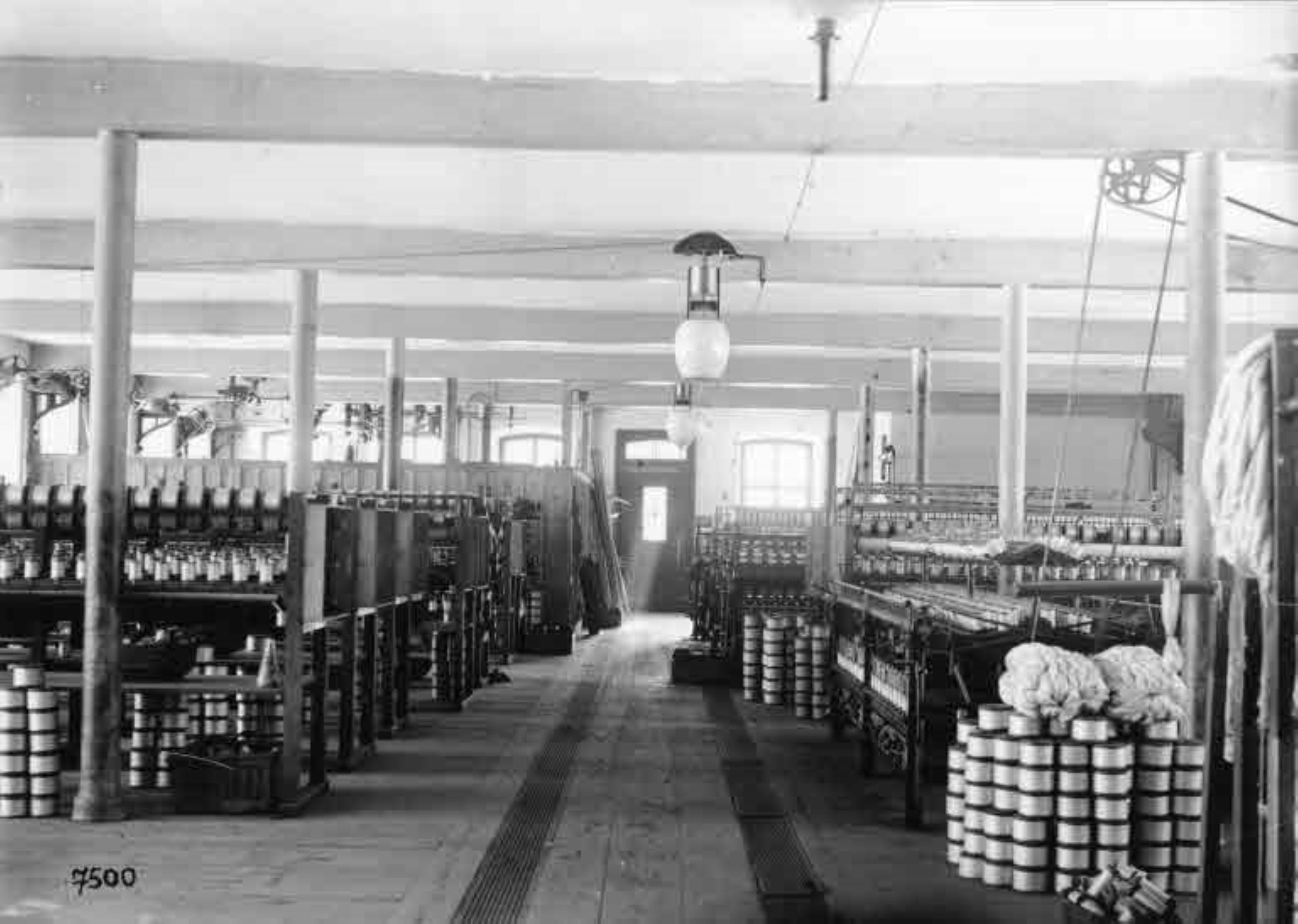
Silk twining machines

She then pretended to be one year older to work at the large silk mill at Mühlesteg in Zürich. At first, she did piece work, but was so productive that the mill started to deduct her wages for allegedly defective work. One of her co-workers explained that if the children were paid more than the adults operating the machines, it would cause the adults to demand higher wages, which the factory owners would not pay. She was then reassigned to help with the machines, where the adults warned that one young girl had lost several fingers in an accident. One evening, as she was leaving the factory, she encountered Johanna Greulich, wife of Hermann Greulich, an early leader among Swiss socialists. Greulich and others were distributing pamphlets demanding safer working conditions and better wages. When she told her mother about the protest, her mother refused to allow her to return to machine work.

Knecht then worked in a small fashion studio that produced ties and other neckwear. As her family was struggling financially, she took extra piece work home and sewed ties until midnight. She then moved to a large tailor, where dozens of seamstresses were overcrowded in a hot attic. Wages were poor and regularly paid late. Eventually, the younger workers including Knecht were told to stop working until the fall.

At the age of sixteen, Knecht went to work at the Zürrer silk house, and followed her manager, Karl Gustav Henneberg, when he opened his own silk house. For over five years, she worked as a sales assistant, most nights until after the store had closed at nine-thirty. She then sewed silk ribbons and ties into the early morning hours, also with help from her mother. The Henneberg silk house moved into a new modern building with electric lighting. During the first winter, the large salesroom was unheated, and Knecht became severely ill. Henneberg sent a letter threatening to fire her unless she returned to work within three days. Although he allowed her to return, Knecht later resigned.

== Marriage and political activism ==
Verena and Conrad Conzett were married on 23 September 1883. Conrad was the printer and publisher of Sozialdemokrat, the weekly newspaper of the Social Democratic Party of Germany, which was "in exile" while the Anti-Socialist Laws introduced by German Chancellor Otto von Bismarck were in effect. The newspaper Sozialdemokrat was regularly smuggled from Zürich over the border into Germany, leading to intense interest from the police and informants. In addition, Conrad was the owner and editor of Arbeiterstimme (The Worker's Voice), and was active in reviving the workers' party in Switzerland.

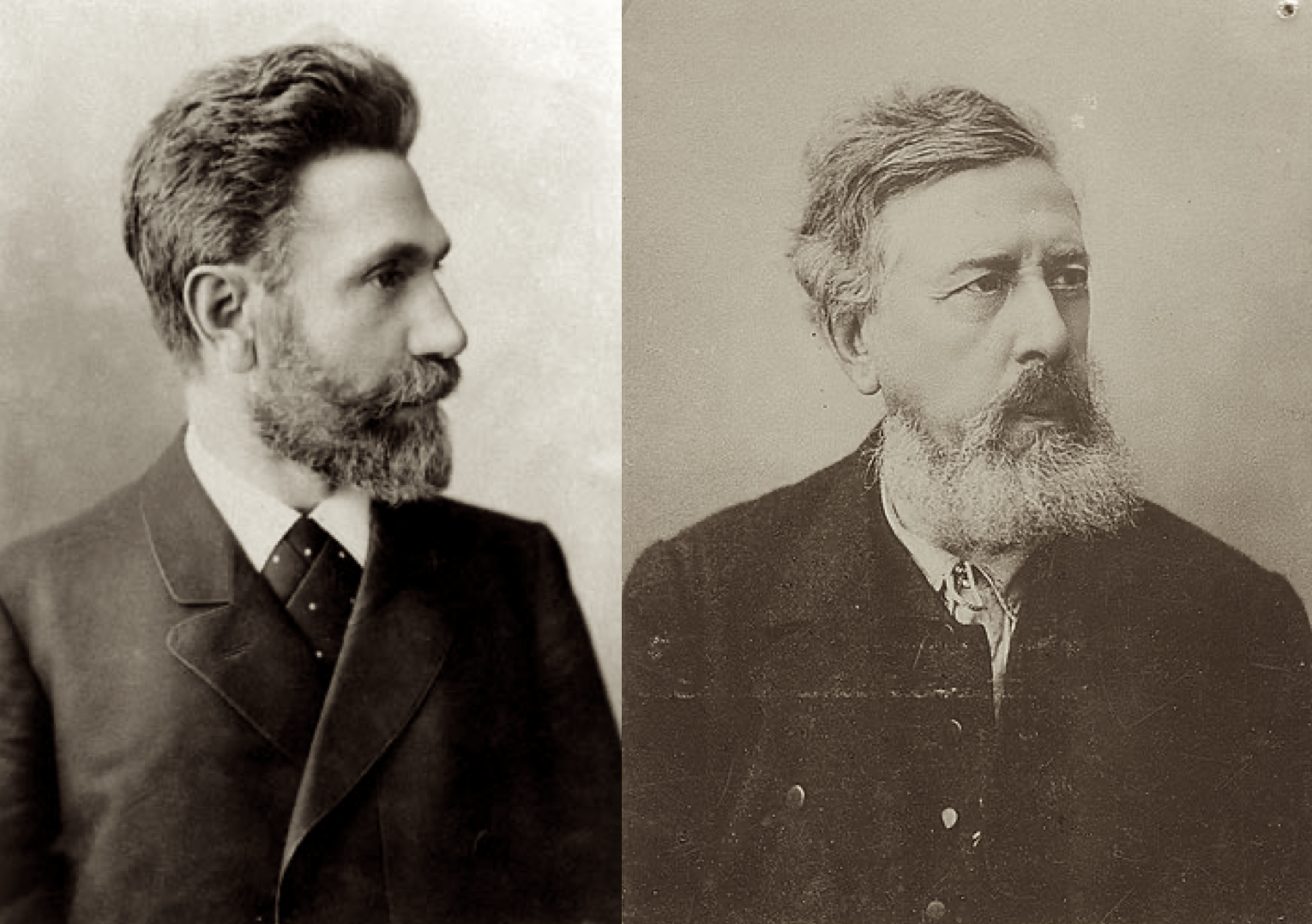
August Bebel and Wilhelm Liebknecht

Verena Conzett joined the Social Democratic Party (SP) of Switzerland, as well as the Zürich women workers' association (Arbeiterinnenverein). The first women workers' associations in Switzerland had been founded by international activist Gertrude Guillaume-Schack starting in 1885. Based on her own experiences, Conzett saw the need to help thousands of women who were working 11-hour days in factories, or 16-hour days in small businesses, to ensure their children would not starve. She was also concerned for the welfare of children from working families.

Through Conrad's connections, Verena Conzett met numerous luminaries in the Swiss and international labor movement, many of whom visited their home. Shortly after they were married, they visited the elderly Johann Philipp Becker, a close associate of Karl Marx and Friedrich Engels, in Neuenburg. She got to know early leaders of the German Social Democratic Party including Wilhelm Liebknecht and August Bebel, as well as Julie Bebel and their children. Other visitors included Swiss political leaders such as Hermann Greulich and Paul Pflüger.

=== Zürcher Anzeiger ===
Following the death of their infant daughter in 1885, Conrad proposed that Verena join him in a new business venture. His idea was to start a book printing business, as well as a new "family" newspaper that would be less explicitly tied to Social Democratic Party politics. A progressive newspaper that happened to be pro-Social Democrat would help to counteract the negativity toward them in the press.

After extensive planning together, the Conzetts published the first issue of Zürcher Anzeiger in January 1886. Within a relatively short period of time, they had several thousand subscribers. The newspaper was also successful in recruiting new members – both men and women – to the Social Democratic Party in Switzerland. From April 1886, their new printing house also took over printing of Arbeiterstimme. There was limited space in their business premises, so Conrad moved his editorial office to their nearby apartment. Verena Conzett thus oversaw day-to-day management of their two newspaper publications – Zürcher Anzeiger and Arbeiterstimme – and learned to run them independently. Other printing projects included the annual report of the Swiss Workers' Union. In 1890, Conrad sold the book printing business to the Grütli Union and handed over Arbeiterstimme to a new editor, Robert Seidel. The Conzetts continued to edit and publish Zürcher Anzeiger, but outsourced printing of the newspaper to the new Grütli print house.

=== Advocacy for female workers ===
In the early 1890s, the Conzetts became the "power couple" of the Swiss Left. Verena Conzett became the first president of the Swiss Women Workers' Union (SAV) (Schweizerischer Arbeiterinnenverband) in 1890. Conrad Conzett became president of the Swiss Trade Union Federation (SGB) in 1891.

The Swiss Women Workers' Union united five associations which had formed previously in Basel, Bern, St. Gallen, Winterthur and Zürich. Under Conzett's leadership, the SAV was initially focused on insurance protection for women as workers and as mothers, and for their young children.

In 1892, the canton of Zürich was considering a worker protection law that would apply to approximately 2,000 young girls and apprentices working across 150 small businesses. Conzett was tasked with gathering evidence on worker exploitation across different professions. She found that the worst complaints came from dressmakers, milliners, and straighteners. Many were working 13- to 16-hour days, including Sundays, and sleeping on dirty linen laid out on the floor. The female worker protection law was passed in the canton in 1894.

Verena Conzett was one of 101 Swiss delegates to the International Socialist Workers Congress, which took place in Zürich in August 1893. One of the main items discussed was protection for women workers, child workers, and pregnant workers, which varied significantly across countries. At the congress, Conzett received her very first public speaking invitation. Later that year, she delivered a speech in Basel which received a positive review in Basler Vorwärts, and went on to become a notable public speaker.

In September 1896, Conzett attended the first Swiss Women's Congress in Geneva. She presented a report on unemployment, health and accident insurance, arguing that the only viable solution was to offer it through the federal government. That year, she was also elected to the federal board of the Swiss Workers' Association. In August 1897, Verena Conzett was a delegate to the International Congress for the Protection of Workers in Zürich, selected by the Zürich women's association.

=== Business challenges ===
In 1894, Conrad Conzett had resigned from the central committee of the Swiss Trade Union Federation (SGB), due to his frustration with infighting. His resignation had a negative impact on their business, resulting in a decline in print orders. Starting that year, the Zürcher Anzeiger also faced increasing competition from Tagesanzeiger, a daily newspaper which was unaffiliated politically and was initially distributed for free. To attract new subscribers – and help protect workers and their families – Verena proposed selling subscriptions to Zürcher Anzeiger bundled together with accident insurance. On 28 November 1897, Conrad finally agreed, and Verena arranged for the new program to start on 1 January 1898.

== Business recovery and success ==
Due to depression and financial problems, Conrad Conzett committed suicide on 8 December 1897. The editor of Grütlianer, Hans Mettier, took over editing Zürcher Anzeiger until Verena was ready to find a new editor. Meanwhile, Verena Conzett took over the print shop in Aussersihl. She bid for the printing contract for the daily Social Democratic Party newspaper Volksrecht, but lost. Her competitors argued that a print shop led by a woman was likely to go out of business. In less than a month, she was heavily in debt, with many creditors demanding payment or collateral. Although there had been an uptake in subscriptions to Zürcher Anzeiger, Conzett had neglected to raise the price to help cover the cost of adding accident insurance. The cost of acquiring new subscribers had become unsustainable, and she needed new printing orders to keep the business afloat.

Ironically, Conzett narrowly escaped bankruptcy after receiving a large printing order from the Debt Collectors Office. She had received a notice from the Debt Collectors Office informing her that several hundred francs were due for payment. When she responded that there was no way she could comply with the notice, the debt collection officer offered to give her a large printing order instead. The print order was for 20,000 "payment due" notices.

=== Investment in linotype machine ===
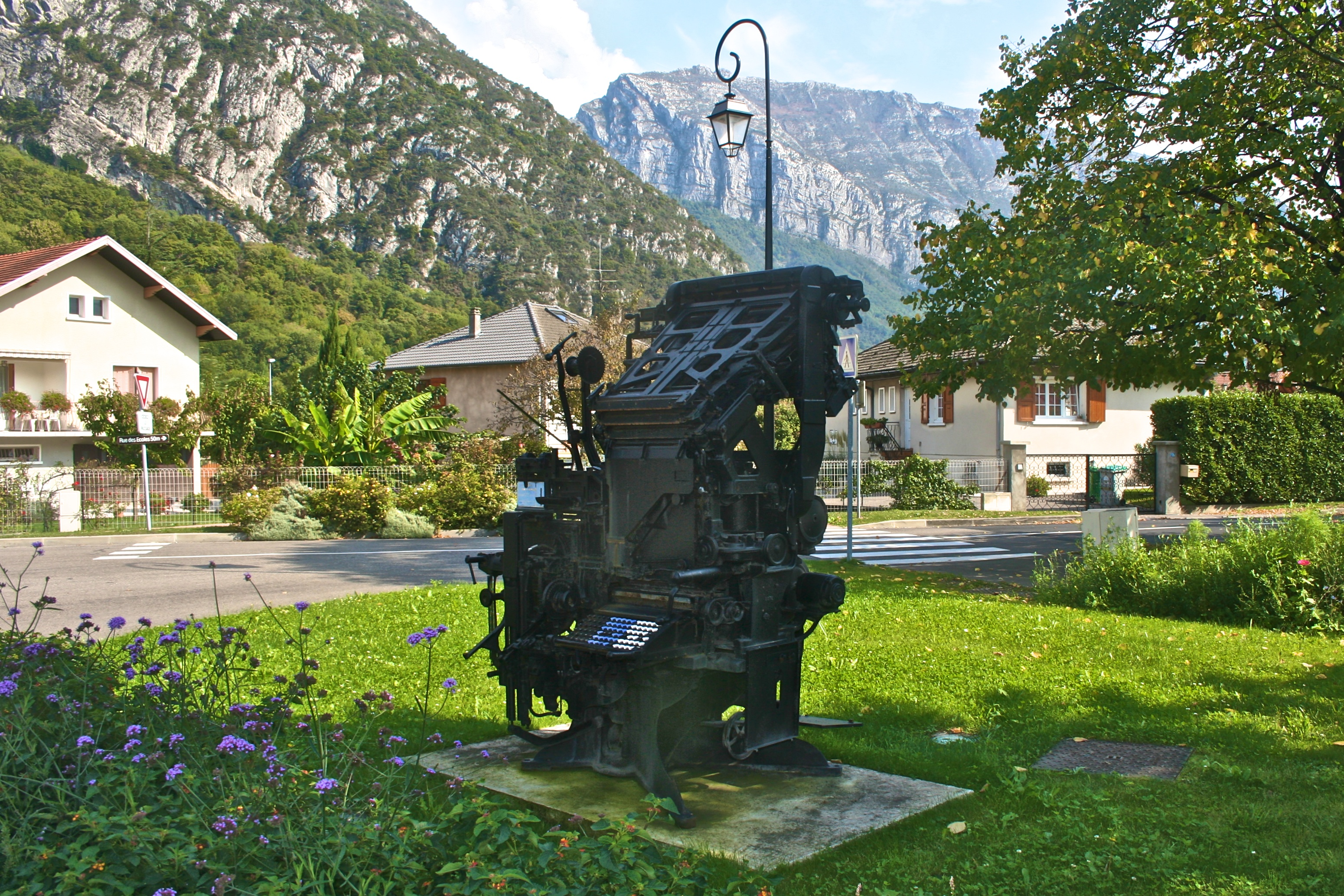
Mergenthaler Linotype machine

In 1906, Conzett bid for the printing contract for a new edition of the Swiss local directory. She won the contract after meeting at the Federal Palace of Switzerland in Bern with Ludwig Forrer, a member of the Federal Council. In 1907, she won a very large contract to print the tax register for the city of Zürich.

By late 1907, Conzett had received so many print orders for newspapers and other recurring items, she no longer had enough capacity to support the incoming business. In 1908, she invested in a linotype typesetting machine. Others in the industry questioned whether a business of her size would have enough print orders to justify the cost. Until then, only the Neue Zürcher Zeitung (NZZ) had adopted Linotype. She would later credit her timely investment in linotype for saving her business.

=== Founding of Conzett & Huber ===
In 1908, the new owner of Zürcher Anzeiger decided to take the printing of the newspaper to a different publisher. The unexpected loss of the Zürcher Anzeiger presented a significant challenge to Conzett's business, so soon after she had taken the risk of investing in Linotype.

Conzett decided to start a new magazine that would provide a steady stream of income, and persuaded Dr. Emil Huber to join her as her business associate. Huber, a young lawyer who lived in the same house, had advised her previously on legal matters. He became a "silent shareholder" of the newly established Conzett & Huber. Her son Hans Conzett, who had been apprenticing with printers around the world, returned from Italy to run the print shop, so that she could focus on editing the new magazine. Hans later also became a partner in Conzett & Huber.

=== In freien Stunden ===
Like its namesake, a Social Democratic magazine in Berlin, In freien Stunden was a commercial success. In freien Stunden was illustrated and featured "high quality" literature – including romances and serial novels – targeting working class families. Readers of the Zürcher Anzeiger had often asked for stories entertaining the whole family. By offering good fiction, Conzett hoped to offer "food for the soul" and discourage readers from reading "trash" such as the pulp novels which had flooded the Swiss market for decades.

As with Zürcher Anzeiger, subscribers to In freien Stunden automatically received accident insurance together with the magazine. This time, the growth in the number of subscribers allowed the publication to improve the level of insurance coverage, as well as the terms and conditions. Conzett & Huber was quickly inundated with questions about insurance coverage. To ensure that readers received a high level of customer service, Conzett hired an employee dedicated to answering letters from subscribers. The publication also used audience surveys to clarify the needs of its readership, an innovative approach at the time. In response to numerous requests from the French-speaking part of Switzerland, Conzett & Huber started a similar French language magazine called Lectures du foyer. By 1914, Conzett & Huber had two dozen employees. With a circulation of 40,000, In freien Stunden had become the most widely read family magazine in Switzerland.

=== "The Red Entrepreneur" ===
Conzett's success in business led to distrust among her comrades in the labor movement. In 1906, the party newspaper Volksrecht transitioned from a private entity to a cooperative, raising questions as to whether Conzett & Huber should follow suit as well. In meetings, Conzett herself was suddenly treated as a representative of the "industrialists". She resigned from the Swiss Women Workers' Union (SAV) but decided to retain her membership in the Socialist Party (SP), and remained committed to workers' rights. In 1911, once Conzett & Huber was in a stronger position financially, it became the first privately owned printing business in Switzerland to offer Saturday afternoons off for all employees. In her book, Conzett acknowledged that it was sometimes difficult to be both a Social Democratic party member and a business owner at the same time, leading biographers to call her "The Red Entrepreneur".

Conzett finally retired in 1926, at the age of 65. Her niece Berti Blattman succeeded her as editor of In freien Stunden, while Emil Huber took over management of the printing shop, in addition to publishing the magazines. She remained active as a founding board member of the Inselhof home for unmarried women and their children.

== Personal life ==
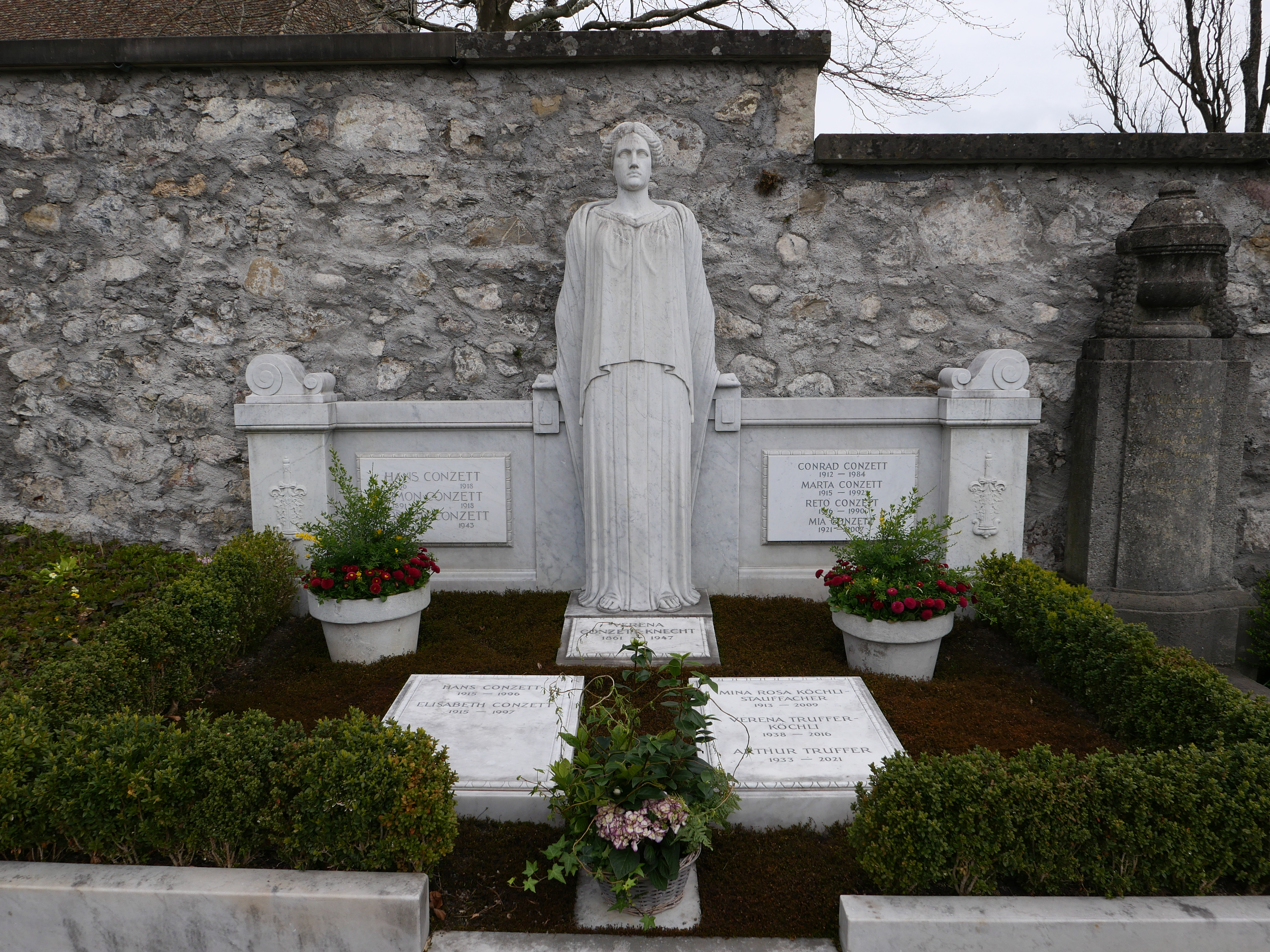
The grave of Conzett and many of her family members, amongst them her son Hans and her grandson Hans.

Verena married Conrad Conzett in 1883, when she was nearly 22 years old. Conrad was divorced with two sons: Conrad, age eight, and Adolf, age six. His ex-wife had been unhappy living in Chur, and returned to America. Verena agreed to take responsibility for the children as their young stepmother. The Conzetts lost their infant daughter Margrit to typhus in 1885. The following year, the couple had their first son together, Hans. Another son, Simon, was born in 1891.

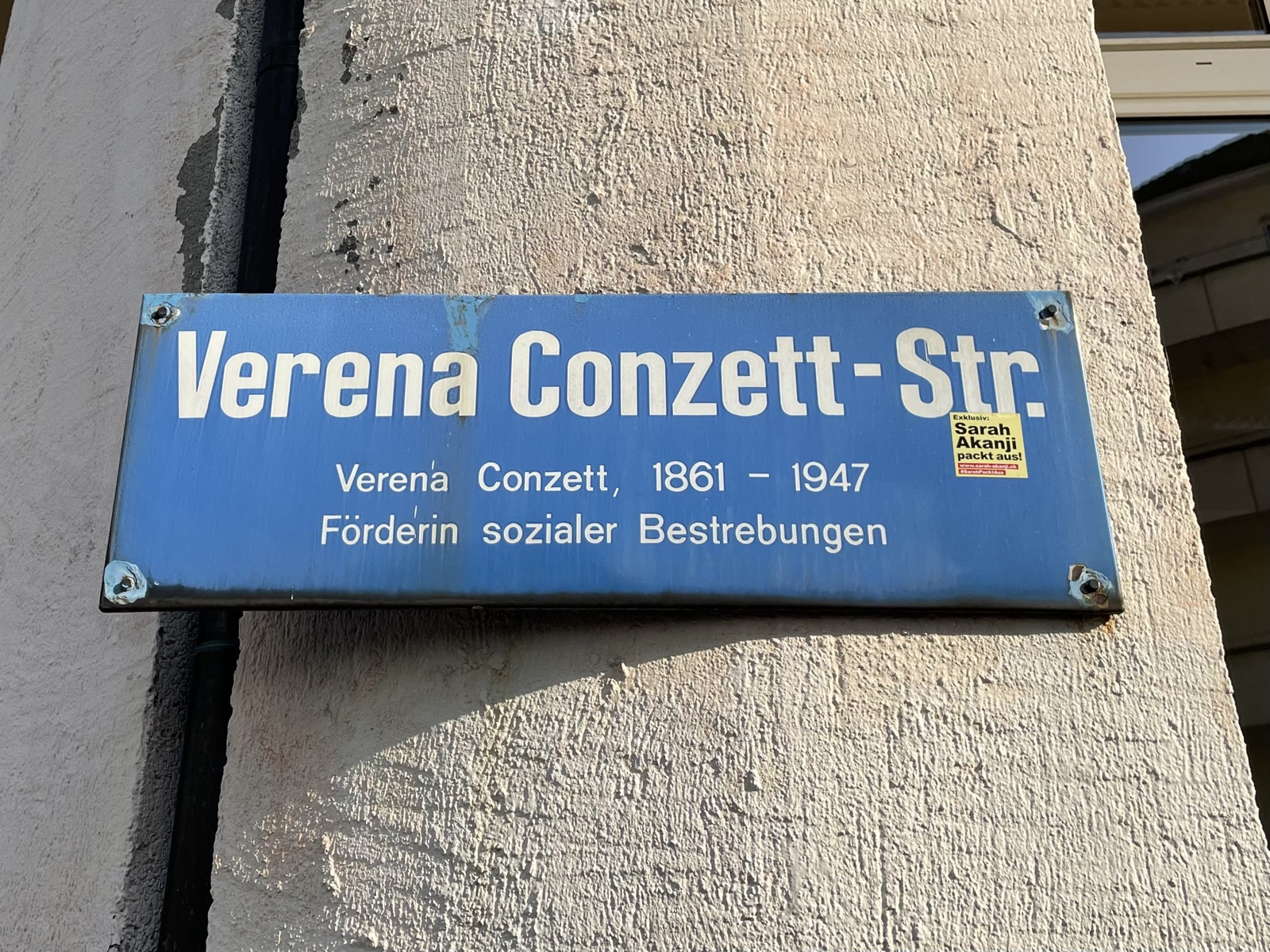
Sign of the street named after Conzett..

In 1918, both Hans and Simon died of the Spanish flu within a single week, after which she had to take over day-to-day management of the print shop once again. Verena said she was motivated to continue working, so that her grandchildren could take over the family business someday. One of her grandchildren, Hans Conzett, would later work at Conzett & Huber and go on to become a politician in the Swiss People's Party. Verena Conzett died in Kilchberg on 14 November 1947, and is buried at the cemetery of Kilchberg.

The Verena-Conzett-Strasse in District 4 in Zürich is named after her.

=== Autobiography ===
In 1929, Verena Conzett published her autobiography, Erstrebtes und Erlebtes: Ein Stück Zeitgeschichte. The book title has been translated as "Endeavors and Experiences: A Fragment of Contemporary History". According to Conzett, she had promised her sons, Hans and Simon, that she would write a book about her life, two weeks before they died. The autobiography was also intended to educate future generations of Social Democrats about the "selflessness and self-sacrifice" of the early leaders in the movement.

== Cited sources ==
- Verena Conzett – Erstrebtes und Erlebtes (Autobiography of Verena Conzett)
- Hans Peter Treichler – Die Arbeiterin in Zürich um 1900 (Biography in social historical context)
