= Netherlands Music Institute =

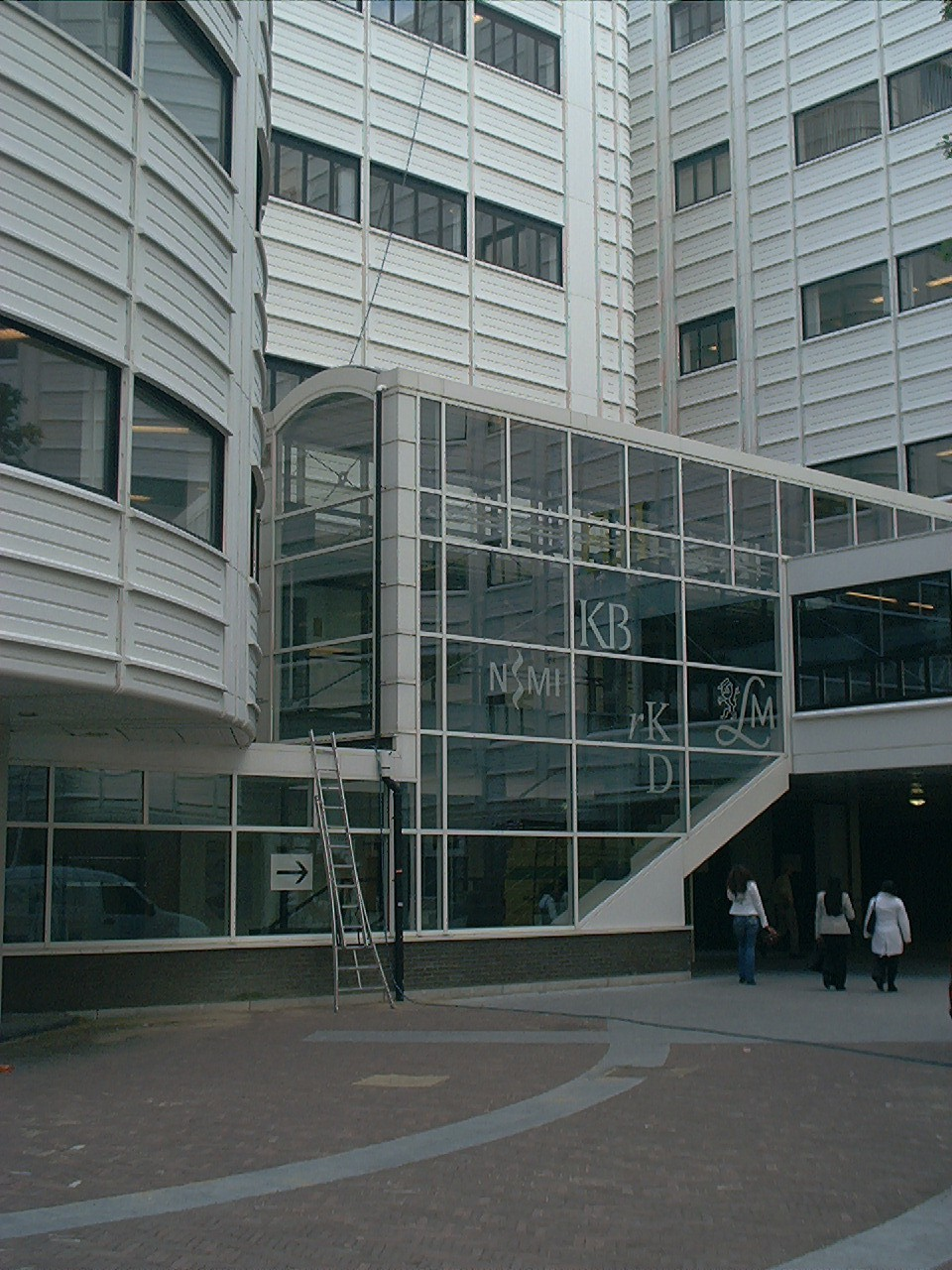
As the logos on the window show, the NMI shared the same building located at Den Haag Centraal with the National Archives, the Nederlands Letterkundig Museum (LM), the Koninklijke Bibliotheek and the RKD.

The Netherlands Music Institute (Nederlands Muziek Instituut, NMI) is the central institution for the preservation of the musical heritage of the Netherlands.

== History of the institute ==
The NMI has existed as a foundation since 1996; it became fully independent in 2006. In that same year the NMI was designated ‘sector institute for musical heritage’ by the Ministry of Education, Culture and Science. It receives a subsidy from the municipality of The Hague and from the national government.

Historical roots of the NMI are the music archives and music library of the Gemeentemuseum Den Haag (Municipal Museum) in The Hague and the documentary collection of the Musica Neerlandica Foundation.

== Collections ==
The library collection contains at present 140.000 titles, with focus on the history of music in the Netherlands, European music before 1900, and organology. Several major collections have been integrated into its holdings of sheet music; among them, that of the Théâtre Français de La Haye (700 scores with parts, printed before 1850), the Johann Alsbach collection of music published in the Netherlands (11.000 titles), the Frans Vester collection of flute music (4000 titles) and Willem Noske collection of violin music (27.000 titles). Besides numerous rare first editions the library contains a number of important manuscripts, including the Siena Lute Manuscript, Mozart's Galimathias Musicum K.32 and the so-called Frankenberg organ manuscript of Johann Gottfried Walther.

The archives collection contains archives of Dutch composers, performing musicians and musical institutions.
