= International Socialist Workers Congress, Zürich 1893 =

3rd Congress of the Second International

Participants of the International Socialist Workers' Congress (1893) (from left to right) Simon Ferdinand (Bebel's son-in-law), Frieda Simon (Bebel's daughter), Clara Zetkin, Friedrich Engels, Julie Bebel, August Bebel, Ernst Schattner (Regina Bernstein's son from his earlier husband, Carl Schattner), Regina Bernstein (Eduard Bernstein's wife) and Eduard Bernstein at the restaurant "Löwen" in Bendlikon, August 12, 1893.

The International Socialist Workers Congress in Zürich that met from 6 to 13 August 1893 was the third congress of the Second International. The congress passed the "Zurich resolution" which expelled anarchists from the congress. On 12 August, Friedrich Engels was designated the honorary president for the day and delivered the closing address, the only time that Engels addressed a Second International period congress. Notable participants included an official delegation from the British trade union movement, led by John Hodge.

== Resolutions ==
Before deliberations could begin, the Congress voted to exclude the anarchists led by Gustav Landauer, who left in protest. Engels later emphasised the need to remain separate from the anarchists in his closing speech. The mandate of Rosa Luxemburg as a delegate of the Socialists of Poland and Lithuania, in opposition to the Polish Social Democratic Party, was also rejected.

== Delegations ==
Country	# of delegates	Notes
Australia	1	
Austria	27	Victor Adler
Bohemia	7	
Belgium	17	Emile Vandervelde
Brazil	2	Brazilian mandates held by Wilhelm Liebknecht (Ger.) and Robert Seidel (Swiss)
Bulgaria	2	Yanko Sakazov
Denmark	2	
France	41	
Germany	92	August Bebel, representing the Social Democratic Party of Germany
Great Britain	65	
Hungary	9	
Italy	21	Filippo Turati
Poland	11	Stanislaw Mendelson; Ignacy Daszyński
Romania	5	Constantin Dobrogeanu-Gherea
Russia	1	Pavel Axelrod
Serbia	1	
Spain	2	
Switzerland	101	Verena Conzett
United States	3	

== Bibliography ==
- Braunthal, Julius. History of the International, Volume 1: 1864–1914.
- Haupt, Georges. La Deuxième Internationale, 1889–1914: étude critique des sources, essai bibliographique.
