= Marburg Picture Index =

German image database of art and architecture

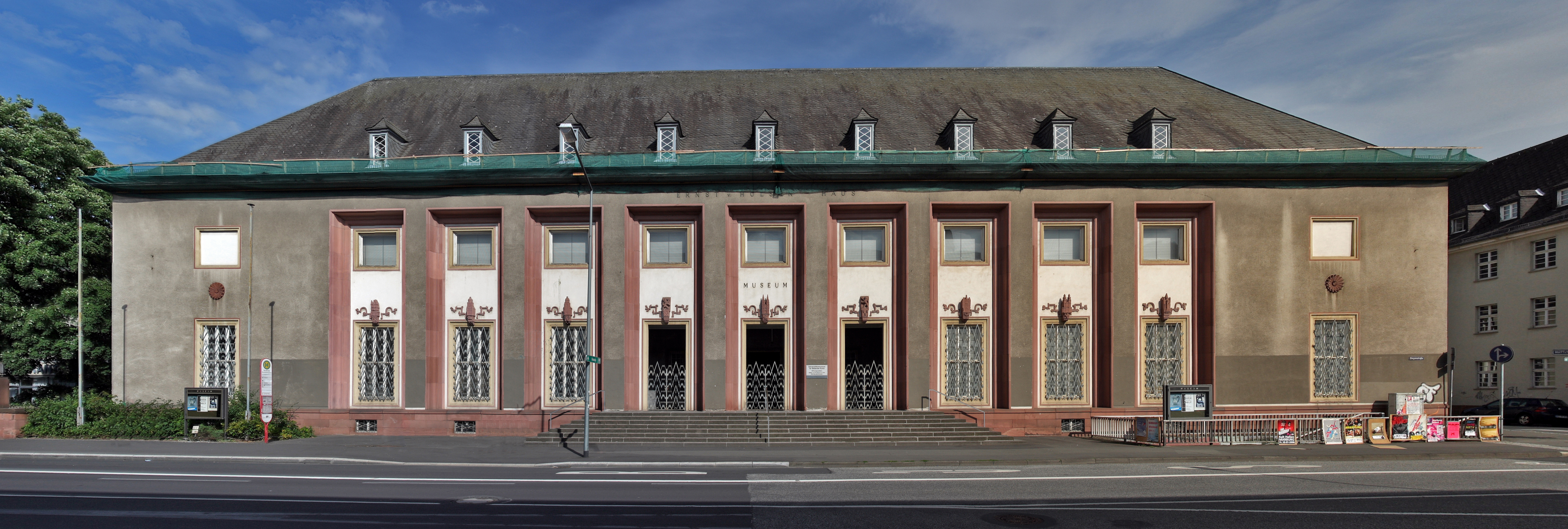
The Kunstgebäude der Philipps-Universität Marburg (Art Building of the Philipps University of Marburg) houses the offices of the Bildarchiv Foto Marburg.

The Bildindex der Kunst und Architektur (English: Image Index of Art and Architecture) is an open online database of 3.2 million photographs of 1.9 million artworks and architectural objects. The owner and operator of the database is the "Deutsches Dokumentationszentrum für Kunstgeschichte" ("German Documentation Center for Art History"), known formally as "Bildarchiv Foto Marburg" ("Image Archive Photo Marburg").

In addition to its own image holdings, around 2 million images from 90 partner institutions are also available online. Not all images are of German objects. In 1976 the institution purchased thousands of photographs of the Du magazine of the Swiss publishing house Conzett & Huber.

Between 1977 and 2008, 1.4 million photographs from 15 different institutions were made available on microfiche by Bildarchiv Foto Marburg as the "Marburger Index : Inventar der Kunst in Deutschland" ("Marburger Index : Inventory of Art in Germany"). Published digital reproductions of these microfiche photographs from the original partner institutions now form the basis of the image index.
