= Manesse Verlag =

German publishing house

- Parent company: Penguin Random House
- Founded: 1944
- Country of origin: Germany
- Headquarters location: Munich
- Key people: Horst Lauinger
- Fiction genres: Classic Literature
- Official website: www.manesse.ch

The Manesse Verlag is a German publishing house for classical literature, founded in 1944 in Zürich in Switzerland. It belongs today to Random House publishing group based in Munich. The publishing house is mainly known for its library of world literature. It also publishes first and new translations of classical works. Manesse is directed by Horst Lauinger.

== History ==
Walther Meier founded the Manesse Verlag in Zürich in 1944. Two years earlier, he had discussed the idea of a "world literary library" for classical literature, with the printing house Conzett & Huber. The name of the publishing house was based on the Codex Manesse. The first two works published by Manesse Verlag in 1944 were "Moby Dick" by Herman Melville translated by Fritz Güttinger and "Goethe im Gespräch" (Goethe in Conversation) by Eduard Korrodi. In the mid 1950s, the 100th volume of the so-called Manesse Library of World Literacy was published, "Deutsche Lyrik des Mittelalters" (German Lyric of the Middle Ages) by Max Wehrli, and in 2004 came the 600th volume, Henry Fielding's "Tom Jones". After Walther Meier had handed over the management of the publishing house to Federico Hindermann in the early 1970s, Conzett & Huber completely separated from Manesse in 1983. The publisher became an independent company and was taken over by the Deutsche Verlags-Anstalt.

After the turn of the millennium, Horst Lauinger followed Anne Marie Wells as the publisher. In September 2005, it was announced that the Random House publishing group wanted to take over the book publishers of the Frankfurter Allgemeine Zeitung, including Manesse, DVA and the Kösel Verlag. The purchase price was, according to media reports, in the lower double-digit million range. From viewers, the purchase was labeled as a "late development of the newspaper industry". Publishers of competing companies warned against further concentration of the industry. It was feared in particular that the diversity of the German book market would be jeopardized. Random House publishing group took over all shares in the Manesse Verlag GmbH and was therefore the sole shareholder. Manesse is a programmatic and publicly independent publisher of the company today. The corresponding company was deleted from the commercial register.

== Program ==
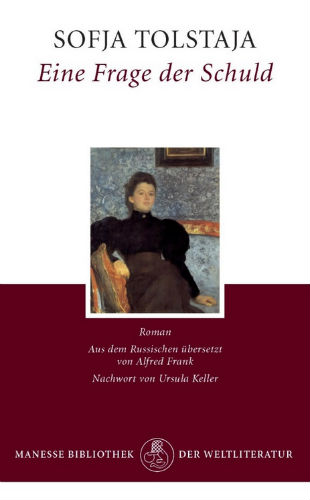
"A Question of Guilt" (2008)

Manesse is a classic publishing house that mainly publishes new and first translations. In the publishing house, works by authors such as Jane Austen, Herman Bang, Tania Blixen, Elizabeth Gaskell, Eduard von Keyserling, Joaquim Maria Machado de Assis, Nizami Ganjavi, Italo Svevo, Dante Alighieri, and Jun'ichirō Tanizaki were published. In 1994 Manesse published "German Narrators of the 20th Century" by Marcel Reich-Ranicki. The publisher achieved a great deal of recognition in 2001 with "Eine Bluttat, ein Betrug und ein Bund fürs Leben" (A Murder, a Mystery, and a Marriage) by Mark Twain. The narrative was published in a translation by Frank Heibert and an epilogue by Georg Klein published at the same time as the American original. Among the best known works of the publishing house are Sophia Tolstaya's "Eine Frage der Schuld" (A question of guilt) and "101 Nacht" (101 nights). All the volumes of the World Literary Library are thread-bound, bound in linen, and equipped with a reading tape. The name of the author and the titles of the book are usually in gold on the back of the book. Each volume contains an epilogue by a contemporary author, literary critic or literary scholar.

== Literatur ==
- Manesse Almanach auf das 40. Verlagsjahr. Manesse, Zürich 1984, ISBN 3-7175-1680-9, DNB.
- Manesse Almanach auf das 50. Verlagsjahr. Manesse, Zürich 1994, ISBN 3-7175-1864-X, DNB.
- Vom Glück des Lesens und Gelesenwerdens. Manesse, Zürich 2004, ISBN 3-7175-2052-0, DNB.
