= Netherlands Institute for Art History =

Dutch national library of art history and holder of Dutch art history thesaurus

- RKD-Nederlands Instituut voor Kunstgeschiedenis

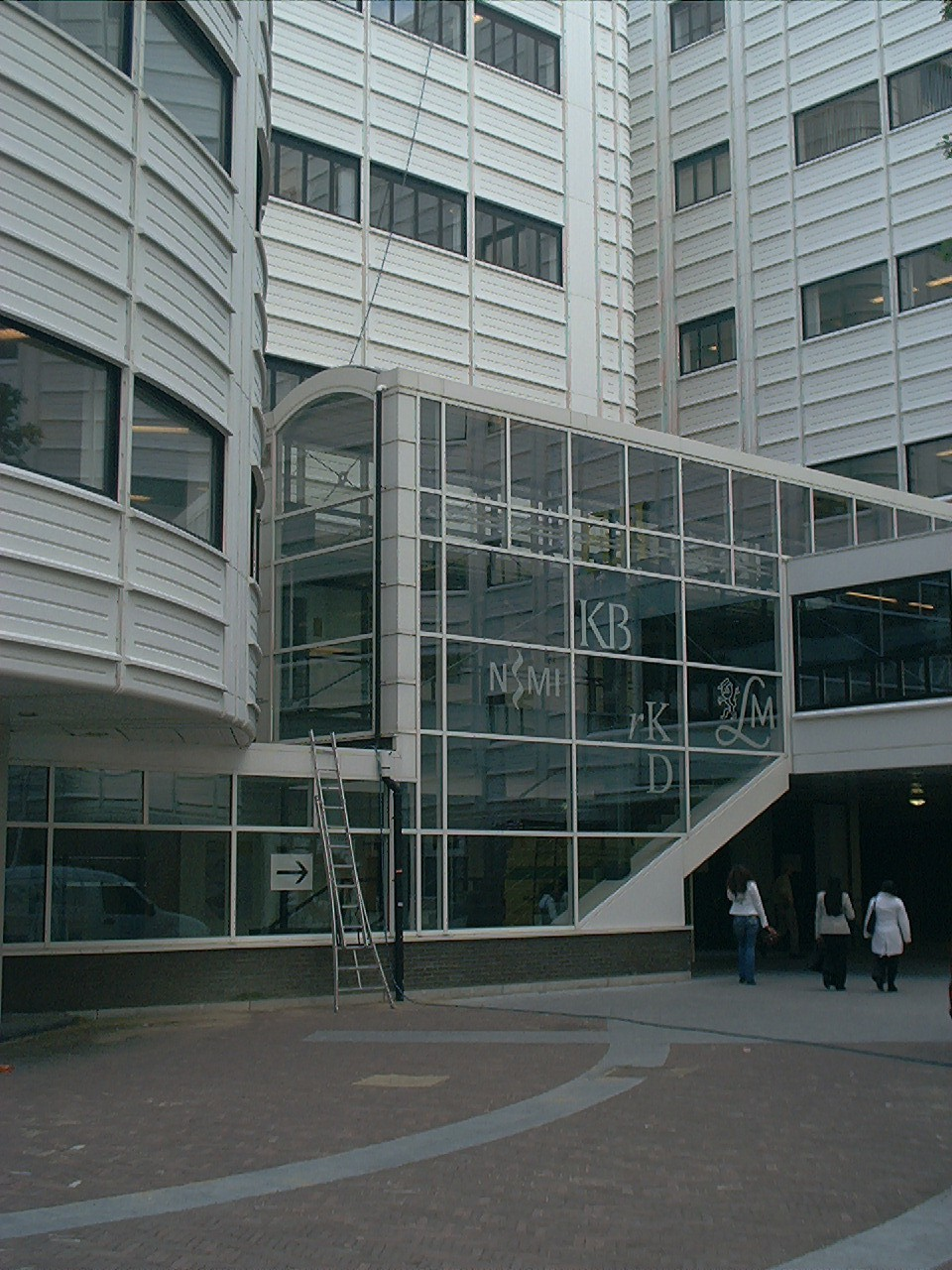
- As the logos on the window show, the RKD shares the same building (located near Den Haag Centraal) with the Nederlands Letterkundig Museum (LM), the Huygens ING, the Netherlands Music Institute (NMI), and the Koninklijke Bibliotheek (KB).
- Interactive map of Netherlands Institute for Art History
- 52°04′54″N 4°19′39″E
- Alternative name: Rijksbureau voor Kunsthistorische Documentatie (RKD)
- Location: Prins Willem-Alexanderhof 5, The Hague, Kingdom of the Netherlands
- Type: Art history archive

Building information
- Building: Koninklijke Bibliotheek (KB)
- Website: https://rkd.nl/

The Netherlands Institute for Art History or RKD (Dutch: RKD-Nederlands Instituut voor Kunstgeschiedenis), previously the Rijksbureau voor Kunsthistorische Documentatie (RKD), is located in The Hague and is home to the largest art history centre in the world. The centre specialises in documentation, archives, and books on Western art from the late Middle Ages until modern times. All of this is open to the public, and much of it has been digitised and is available on their website. The main goal of the bureau is to collect, categorise, and make art research available, most notably in the field of Dutch Masters.

Via the available databases, the visitor can gain insight into archival evidence on the lives of many artists of past centuries. The library owns approximately 450,000 titles, of which ca. 150,000 are auction catalogs. There are ca. 3,000 magazines, of which 600 are currently running subscriptions. Though most of the text is in Dutch, the standard record format includes a link to library entries and images of known works, which include English as well as Dutch titles.

The RKD also manages the Dutch version of the Art and Architecture Thesaurus, a thesaurus of terms for management of information on art and architecture. The original version is an initiative of the Getty Research Institute in Los Angeles.

== History and collections ==
The RKD started in 1932, and by 1936 was based at the Korte Vijverberg in The Hague. However, the collections themselves were spread across different depots. In 1982, the location was centralised at the Koninklijke Bibliotheek (National Library of the Netherlands).

The impetus for setting up the organisation was three separate bequests. Firstly from Frits Lugt, art historian and owner of a broad collection of drawings and prints; secondly from Cornelis Hofstede de Groot (1863–1930), a collector, art historian, and museum curator; and finally from Eltjo van Beresteyn, who donated documentation related to the history of the Dutch portrait.

Following the second world war, the collection expanded - the focus was not longer early modern Dutch art, but widened to include documentation related to 19th- and 20th-century art. As a consequence the name was modified in 2014. The acronym RKD was maintained but the name changed to Nederlands Instituut voor Kunstgeschiedenis.

== Digital collections online - RKD Research ==
The collections of the RKD are delivered online via the platform RKDResearch. Available in both Dutch and English, the collections is filtered according to various types of data. For example:

=== Online artist pages ===
In the artist database RKDartists, each artist is assigned a record number. To reference an artist page directly, use the code listed at the bottom of the record, followed by the artist's record number. For example, the artist record number for Salvador Dalí is 19752, so his RKD artist page can be referenced.

=== Online artworks pages ===
In the images database RKDimages, each artwork is assigned a record number. To reference an artwork page directly, use the code listed at the bottom of the record, followed by the artwork's record number. For example, the artwork record number for The Night Watch is 3063, so its RKD artwork page can be referenced.

=== Online thesaurus of art terms ===
The Art and Architecture Thesaurus also assigns a record for each term, but these can not be referenced online by record number. Rather, they are used in the databases and the databases can be searched for terms. For example, the painting called The Night Watch is a militia painting, and all records fitting this keyword (Dutch: algemene trefwoord) can be seen by selecting this from the image screen.

The thesaurus is a set of general terms, but the RKD also contains a database for an alternate form of describing artworks, that today is mostly filled with biblical references. This is the iconclass database. To see all images that depict Miriam's dance, the associated iconclass code 71E1232 can be used as a special search term.
