= Hans Conzett =

Swiss politician (1915–1996)

Leader of the Swiss People's Party
- In office 1971–1976
- Preceded by: Post created
- Succeeded by: Fritz Hofmann

Personal details
- Born: 27 July 1915 Zürich, Switzerland
- Died: 20 March 1996 (aged 80) Zürich, Switzerland
- Education: University of Zurich

Hans Conzett (27 July 1915 – 20 March 1996) was a Swiss politician. He served as president of the Farmers, Traders and Independents and of the resulting conservative Swiss People's Party. At the international level he was Chairman of UNICEF. He was also a publisher.

== Biography ==
Born in Zürich, Switzerland, Conzett was the son of National Councilman Hans C. Conzett of the Social Democratic Party. He studied law from 1935 to 1941 at the University of Zurich and obtained his doctorate in 1944. Conzett worked in the print shop Conzett & Huber, where his father was once a partner. As a publisher, he was a promoter of the magazine Du and founder of Manesse library of world literature. In addition, he was involved in UNICEF and headed a Swiss committee from 1959 to 1988 as president. He was the international Chairman of UNICEF from 1974 to 1976.

In his political activity Conzett sat in the National Council as a member of the BGB from 1951 until his resignation in 1971. He presided the Petitions Committee and the Commission of Foreign Affairs, and from 1967 to 1968 the National Council.

As a party politician he presided from 1965 to 1971 the BGB. He advocated an association of Graubünden and Glarus Democrats with the BGB and was then to 1976 the first president of the resulting Swiss People's Party.

Because of his commitment to the preservation of the Stockalper Castle, Conzett was given the honorary citizenship of the city of Brig in 1961.

He died on 20 March 1996, aged 80.
