= Conzett & Huber (publishing house) =

Swiss publishing house

Conzett & Huber was a Swiss publishing house known for the magazines Du and Zürcher Illustrated. In 1908, Verena Conzett made the decision to expand her small print shop into the magazine publisher Conzett & Cie (Conzett & Co.), with lawyer Emil Huber as a "silent shareholder". Huber took over operational management of the company in 1918. By 1929, the company was known as Conzett & Huber.

In 1944, Walther Meier founded Manesse Verlag at Conzett & Huber, which sold it to Deutsche Verlags-Anstalt in 1983. In 1994, the Conzett + Huber AG merged with the Alfred Walter AG to create the Conzett + Walter AG.

== Early history ==
The origins of Conzett & Huber can be traced to a small print shop belonging to Conrad Conzett, an early leader in the Swiss labor movement. In 1898, Verena Conzett, a leader in the labor movement in her own right, took over the heavily indebted print shop following his suicide. In 1908, she established Conzett & Co. as a magazine publisher, with support from lawyer Emil Huber as a silent shareholder. The political ideals of the Conzett family continued to influence the business well into the post-World War II period. Its early publications included Schweizerische Lehrerzeitung (SLZ), the official newspaper of the Swiss Teachers' Union (1891–1927), as well as the annual report of the Swiss Workers' Union (from 1887).

Verena Conzett founded the magazine In Freien Stunden, which was inspired by its namesake in Berlin. Subscribers to In Freien Stunden also received insurance against accidents. The weekly magazine was published until 1967. Between 1926 and 1955, Conzett & Huber published the literary magazine New Swiss Review. After the end of World War I, sales surged and the company reinvested their revenues in a new printing technology. In order to make a better use of the technology, it founded a third newspaper called the Zürcher Illustrated (German:Zürcher Illustrierte) in 1925.

== Zürcher Illustrated ==
In 1925 the Zürcher Illustrated was established under the lead of Emil Huber Frey, which by 1926 had a circulation of 50'000. The amount of printed pages arose from eight to twenty-four until 1928.The publisher Paul Ringier, had dominated the Swiss market with four illustrated newspapers attempted to counter the upcoming competition to his newspaper with the New Illustrated on Mondays (NIM) . This wasn't profitable at all, and by 1929 Ringier changed its name into Sie + Er (She + Him). In 1929, Arnold Kübler became the Editor-in-Chief of the ZI, who shaped it into a magazine with a focus on illustrated photo-stories and employed prominent photographers like Annemarie Schwarzenbach, Gotthard Schuh or Paul Senn. He attempted to rely less on reports on daily news and sportive events as before and included a literary section in which texts by authors like Max Frisch, Albin Zollinger, Friedrich Glauser or Hermann Hesse were published. The reforms led to a considerable surge in the circulation which arose to 71'000 by 1931 and to over 83'000 in 1933. The circulation came at a considerable financial cost, which Huber and later also his successor and nephew Alfred A. Herzer were not willing to pay anymore and after the circulation diminished, the environment for the different illustrated magazines became more competitive amid World War II, Paul Ringier and Conzett & Huber came to an agreement according to which Ringier would buy the ZI for 1.1. Mio. CHF, but subsequently shut it down.

== Du ==
After the closure of the ZI, Conzett & Huber would establish a new magazine, initially mainly aimed at promoting its printing technique which they had developed in its factory. Its first editor in chief would also be Arnold Kübler, who chose Du as the magazines name. The magazine became known for its photo-reportages by prominent photographers like Henri Cartier Bresson, Rene Burri or Werner Bischof. Several thousand colored and black and white photographs of the Du were included in the German Marburg Picture Index in 1976, the year the Marburger institution bought the photographs for 25'000 DM.

== Manesse ==
In 1944 the Manesse Verlag was established, which began to publish the Manesse library of world literature. Its name stems from the medieval Codex Manesse. The publishing house focused on classical works like Herman Melville's Moby-Dick. By 1955, one hundred classics were published. In 1983 Conzett & Huber decided to sell Manesse to the Deutsche Verlags-Anstalt.
