= Nemerov (surname) =

Nemerov is a Russian surname. It may refer to

- Howard Nemerov, Pulitzer Prize winner and American poet laureate
- Alexander Nemerov, Professor of Art and Art History at Stanford University
- Alexander Nemerov (character), a fictional character Tom Clancy's The Sum of All Fears
- Diane Nemerov, the maiden name of Diane Arbus

== See also ==
- Nemyriv (town)
