= Frank Russek =

American businessman

- Born: 1875/1876; Bolesławiec, Poland
- Died: December 10, 1948 (aged 73); New York City, U.S.
- Resting place: Beth David Cemetery
- Occupation: Businessman
- Employer: Russeks
- Known for: co-founder of the Russeks department store chain
- Spouse: Rose Anhalt (or Anholt)
- Children: 2
- Relatives: Diane Arbus (granddaughter); Howard Nemerov (grandson); Doon Arbus (great-granddaughter); Amy Arbus (great-granddaughter)

Frank Russek (1875/1876 – December 10, 1948) was a Polish-born American businessman, and the co-founder of the Russeks department store chain. He was the grandfather of photographer Diane Arbus (who in turn was the mother of photographer Amy Arbus, and of writer and journalist Doon Arbus) and of poet Howard Nemerov (who in turn was the father of art historian Alexander Nemerov).

== Biography ==
Frank Russek was a Polish Jewish immigrant to the United States, born in Bolesławiec, Poland, who arrived in New York City in the late 1800s as a teenager. The Russeks as a fur family dated back to prior to 1823. He started as a furrier in New York City in the late 1800s.

The company Russeks started as a furrier in Manhattan in New York City, co-founded in 1885 by Frank Russek and his brother Isidore H. Russek. It opened in 1901 at 19th Street and Sixth Avenue in Manhattan with less than $1,000 ($39,000 in current dollar terms) in capital, starting with muffs and fur scarfs, and expanded into luxury clothing and accessories, and became Russeks Fifth Avenue, Inc. In 1905 they moved to 23rd Street, in 1911 they moved to 34th Street between Fifth Avenue and Sixth Avenue, and in 1913 they moved to 362 Fifth Avenue.

In September 1924, by which time the store was one of the leading fur stores in New York City, they opened a women's apparel department store on the eight floors of the southwest corner of 390 Fifth Avenue and West 36th Street in Manhattan, which at the time was the most fashionable shopping area in the United States. The store sold among other items frocks, wraps, hats, dress accessories, ermines, Russian sables, dresses, gowns, coats, ensemble suits, tailored suits, and shoes, including new fashions from Paris.

In August 1937, the company opened up a store in Brooklyn in a five-story building on the northwest corner of Fulton Street and Bridge Street. In July 1940, the company opened up a store at 200 North Michigan Avenue in Chicago, Illinois. In 1941, at 18 years of age the granddaughter of Frank Russek (and daughter of future chairman David Nemerov) Diane Nemerov (later known as Diane Arbus) married Allan Arbus, and they both went to work for the Russeks advertising department, and eventually became successful fashion photographers. In 1944 the company had over 1,000 employees. In 1946, the company had a net profit of $1,272,000 ($20,995,000 in current dollar terms). In 1948, it was one of the largest stores in the world that specialized only in women's furs, coats, suits, and dresses.

== Personal life ==
He married Rose Anhalt (or Anholt) in Manhattan on June 18, 1899, and they had two children, Gertrude Russek (1901-1994), and Harold Russek (1903-?). Gertrude Russek married David Nemerov, and they were the parents of photographer Diane Arbus (who in turn was the mother of photographer Amy Arbus, and of writer and journalist Doon Arbus) and poet Howard Nemerov (who in turn was the father of art historian Alexander Nemerov).

Frank Russek was particularly active in the United Jewish Appeal. He died on December 10, 1948, at his home in the Hotel Lombardy in New York City, at 73 years of age. He was a member of Temple Emanu-El in Manhattan, where his funeral services were held, and he is buried at Beth David Cemetery.
