= Alexander Nemerov =

American art professor, historian (born 1963)

- Born: Bennington, Vermont, US
- Occupation: Art historian
- Parent: Howard Nemerov (father)
- Relatives: Frank Russek (great-grandfather); Diane Arbus (aunt); Amy Arbus (cousin); Doon Arbus (cousin)

Academic background
- Education: Yale University
- Thesis: Past Knowing: Frederick Remington’s Old West (1992)
- Doctoral advisor: Jules Prown

Academic work
- Discipline: Nineteenth- and twentieth-century American art
- Institutions: Stanford University; Yale University

Alexander Nemerov is an American art historian. He is the Carl and Marilynn Thoma Provostial Professor in the Arts and Humanities at Stanford University. He specializes in American art dating from the nineteenth and twentieth centuries.

== Career ==
Nemerov received his bachelor's degree in English from the University of Vermont in 1985. He graduated cum laude and as a member of Phi Beta Kappa. He then continued on to Yale University, where he received two degrees in art history: a master's in 1987 and a PhD in 1992. Nemerov wrote a dissertation on Frederic Remington, under the supervision of Jules Prown.

After receiving his doctorate, Nemerov began his teaching career at Stanford University as Assistant Professor of Art History. He was promoted to full Professor in 2000, and a year later, moved to his alma mater Yale to become the Vincent J. Scully Professor of the History of Art. In 2012, Nemerov transferred back to become the Carl and Marilyn Thoma Provostial Professor in the Arts and Humanities.

Throughout his career, Nemerov has focused primarily on the study of American art dating from the nineteenth and twentieth centuries in a variety of media. He has published on artists such as Wilson Bentley, Helen Frankenthaler, Lewis Hine, Jasper Johns, Deana Lawson, Raphaelle Peale, John Quidor, Clifford Ross, and Remington (the subject of his doctoral dissertation). Additionally, he has worked to organize exhibitions on artists such as William Rush at the Wistar Institute (2002) and Remington at the Norman Rockwell Museum (2006). In 2011, he has organized "To Make a World: George Ault and 1940s America" exhibition at Smithsonian American Art Museum.

In 2017, Nemerov gave the annual A. W. Mellon Lectures in the Fine Arts at the National Gallery of Art. His talk was titled "The Forest: America in the 1830s." The lectures were developed into a book of the same name, which was published by Princeton University Press in 2023.

Nemerov's 2021 biography of painter Helen Frankenthaler, Fierce Poise: Helen Frankenthaler and 1950s New York, was a finalist for the National Book Critics Circle Award for Biography.

== Personal life ==
Nemerov is the son of the poet Howard Nemerov, who was the grandson of the businessman Frank Russek, co-founder of the Russeks store chain. Howard's sister is the photographer Diane Arbus, who married the actor Allan Arbus. Their children are the photographer Amy Arbus and the writer Doon Arbus.

== Awards ==
- Smithsonian Institution Material Culture Fellowship, National Museum of American Art (1989-1991)
- Stanford University Dean's Award (1998-1999)
- Stanford University Internal Faculty Fellowship, Stanford Humanities Center (1998-1999)
- The Stanford Daily Top-Ten Professors (2014)
- National Gallery of Art A. W. Mellon Lectures in the Fine Arts (2017)
- Archives of American Art Lawrence A. Fleischman Award for Scholarly Excellence in the Field of American Art History

== Works ==
- Frederic Remington and Turn-of-the-Century America, 1995 ISBN 978-0300055665
- The Body of Raphaelle Peale: Still Life and Selfhood, 1812-1824, 2001 ISBN 978-0520224988
- Icons of Grief: Val Lewton’s Home Front Pictures, 2005 ISBN 978-0520241008
- Acting in the Night: Macbeth and the Places of the Civil War, 2010 ISBN 978-0520251861
- To Make a World: George Ault and 1940s America, 2011 ISBN 978-0-300-17239-3
- Wartime Kiss: Visions of the Moment in the 1940s, 2012 ISBN 978-0691145785
- Silent Dialogues: Diane Arbus and Howard Nemerov, 2015 ISBN 978-1881337416
- Soulmaker: The Times of Lewis Hine, 2016 ISBN 978-0691170176
- Ralph Eugene Meatyard, American Mystic, 2017 ISBN 978-1881337447
- Summoning Pearl Harbor, 2017 ISBN 978-1941701652
- Fierce Poise: Helen Frankenthaler and 1950s New York, 2021 ISBN 978-0525560180
- The Forest: A Fable of America in the 1830s, 2023 ISBN 978-0691244280
