= Amy Arbus =

American photographer (born 1954)

- Born: April 16, 1954 (age 72); New York City, U.S.
- Occupation: Photographer
- Years active: 1976–present
- Parents: Allan Arbus; Diane Arbus
- Relatives: Doon Arbus (sister); Frank Russek (great-grandfather); Howard Nemerov (maternal uncle); Alexander Nemerov (maternal first cousin)

Amy Arbus (born April 16, 1954) is an American photographer. She teaches portraiture at the International Center of Photography, Anderson Ranch, NORD photography and the Fine Arts Work Center. She has published several books of photography, including The Fourth Wall which The New Yorker called her "masterpiece". Her work has appeared in over 100 periodicals including The New Yorker, Vanity Fair, Rolling Stone, Architectural Digest, and The New York Times Magazine. She is the daughter of actor Allan Arbus and photographer Diane Arbus, the sister of writer and journalist Doon Arbus, the great-granddaughter of Russeks co-founder Frank Russek, and the niece of distinguished poet Howard Nemerov.

== Life and work ==
=== "On the Street" ===
From 1980 to 1990, Arbus had a monthly street style column in the Village Voice entitled "On the Street". On starting with the Village Voice, Arbus said that "I went to the Voice with a portfolio that I had taken of one woman, my friend Jan Collins... All they said to me was 'take a picture of anyone who makes you turn your head.'" These photographs explore performances of self and the ways in which people used fashion as an expression of creativity. Her column often featured portraits of celebrities and tastemakers early in their careers including Madonna, fashion designer Anna Sui, nightlife impresario Susanne Bartsch, Andre Walker and The Clash. Arbus shot her subjects from slightly below to "suggest they were monuments".

In 2006, Welcome Books published On the Street : 1980–1990, a collection of more than 70 of the most influential images from Arbus' time at the Village Voice, those that "lend a voice to an era when individuality and self-expression were fighting for breathing room in a culture that valued economics over creativity". John Spellos then created a documentary called On the Street following Arbus as she tracked down the subjects of these photographs 25 years after they were taken.

=== Recent work ===
In a talk at UCLA's Hammer Museum, Arbus described her reluctance to become a photographer and her years studying at the Berklee College of Music and hanging out with The Cars (then still unknown), before studying at the Museum of Fine Arts, Boston. In an interview published in The Guardian, she explains her initial reluctance to enter the field of photography, stating, "I was holding myself back, afraid to compete with this legend... But I remember the minute the viewfinder came up to my eye, I thought, I'm home."

== Publications ==
- No Place Like Home (1986).
- The Inconvenience of Being Born (1999).
- On the Street 1980–1990 (2006).
- The Fourth Wall (2008).
- After Images (2013).

== Collections ==
Her work is held in the following public collections:

- New York Public Library
- Museum of Modern Art, New York
