= Child with Toy Hand Grenade in Central Park =

Photograph by Diane Arbus

Arbus' Child with Toy Hand Grenade in Central Park, N.Y.C. 1962

Arbus' contact sheet from the photo shoot

Child with Toy Hand Grenade in Central Park, N.Y.C. 1962 (1962) is a famous black and white photograph by Diane Arbus.

== Significance ==
The photograph Child with Toy Hand Grenade in Central Park, N.Y.C. 1962, by Diane Arbus, shows a boy, with the left strap of his shorts hanging off his shoulder, tensely holding his long, stringy, thin arms by his side. Clenched in his right hand is a toy replica hand grenade (an Mk 2 "Pineapple"); his left hand is held in a claw-like gesture, and his facial expression is maniacal.

The contact sheet is "revealing with regards to Arbus' working method. She engages with the boy while moving around him, saying she was trying to find the right angle. The sequence of shots she took depicts a really quite ordinary boy who just shows off for the camera. However, the published single image belies this by concentrating on a freakish posture - an editorial choice typical for Arbus who would invariably pick the most expressive image, thereby frequently suggesting an extreme situation." The boy in the photograph is Colin Wood, son of tennis player Sidney Wood. An interview with Colin, with his recollections about the photograph, is presented in the BBC documentary The Genius of Photography.

According to The Washington Post, Colin does not specifically remember Arbus taking the photo, but that he was likely "imitating a face I'd seen in war movies, which I loved watching at the time." Later, as a teenager, he was angry at Arbus for "making fun of a skinny kid with a sailor suit", though he enjoys the photograph now.

She catches me in a moment of exasperation. It's true, I was exasperated. My parents had divorced and there was a general feeling of loneliness, a sense of being abandoned. I was just exploding. She saw that and it's like...commiseration. She captured the loneliness of everyone. It's all people who want to connect but don't know how to connect. And I think that's how she felt about herself. She felt damaged and she hoped that by wallowing in that feeling, through photography, she could transcend herself.

— Colin Wood

== History ==
The photograph was displayed at the Museum of Modern Art in 1967 under the title Exasperated Boy with Toy Hand Grenade in the New Documents exhibition, a three-person show featuring works by Arbus, Lee Friedlander, and Garry Winogrand.

The photograph was published in the Time-Life book The Camera (1970).

The photograph has seven known original prints by Arbus, one of which sold in April 2005 at Christie's in New York for US$408,000 (equivalent to $673,000 in 2025). Posthumous prints from the original negative have been made by Neil Selkirk, authorized by the Arbus estate.

== In popular culture ==
Soon after writing the song "Teach Your Children" in 1968, Graham Nash associated its message about nonviolence with Arbus's photo in a San Francisco gallery. The photograph was used, without permission, on the first version of the cover of Canadian punk band SNFU's 1984 album And No One Else Wanted to Play after the band "found the picture in the library." The image is also used on the cover of American indie rock band Cloud Cult's debut album Who Killed Puck?.

The director John Waters, who had just completed the film Hairspray, sat for a promotional documentary about himself entitled, "Growing Up with John Waters," and immediately tells the off-camera interviewer "...that picture is exactly how I felt as a child… I don’t mean that in a bad way, that kid’s having fun…” and that he “really identified” with child in the photograph. Waters prefaces this by saying that the documentary crew will "never get to show it cause her estate is very, very picky. I promise you, they'll never give you the rights to show it." The filmmakers, in fact, were able show the photo.

In a 1989 interview with Fresh Air, within the same year The Simpsons began airing, creator Matt Groening stated that the character of Bart Simpson was partially inspired by the photograph.

== Collections ==
- Jointly held by Tate and National Galleries of Scotland, UK
- Metropolitan Museum of Art, New York

== See also ==
- Identical Twins, Roselle, New Jersey, 1967
