= Peter Bunnell =

American author, scholar, and historian (1937–2021)

Peter Curtis Bunnell
- Born: October 25, 1937
- Died: September 20, 2021 (aged 83)
- Occupation: Author

Peter Curtis Bunnell (October 25, 1937 – September 20, 2021) was an American author, scholar and historian of photography. For more than 40 years he had a significant impact on collecting, exhibiting, teaching and practicing photography through his work as a university professor, museum curator and prolific author.

== Early life and education ==
Peter Curtis Bunnell was born on October 25, 1937, in Poughkeepsie, New York.

He received an undergraduate degree from the Rochester Institute of Technology, where he studied with photographer Minor White, and an M.F.A. from Ohio University, where he studied with Clarence H. White Jr., the son of the pictorial photographer Clarence Hudson White.

Originally intending to pursue fashion photography, it was his exposure to White that drew him to reconsider photography as a vehicle for personal artistic expression. White became a mentor to Bunnell and recruited him to join the staff of Aperture Aperture (magazine), the only periodical produced for and by photographers practicing the medium as fine art. Bunnell gradually transitioned from being a photographer to studying the medium and its history, but his interest in – and friendship with – White endured until White's passing in 1976.

He then went on to receive an M.A. degree in art history from Yale University, and later became an associate in the Alfred Stieglitz Archive at the university.

== Life and career ==
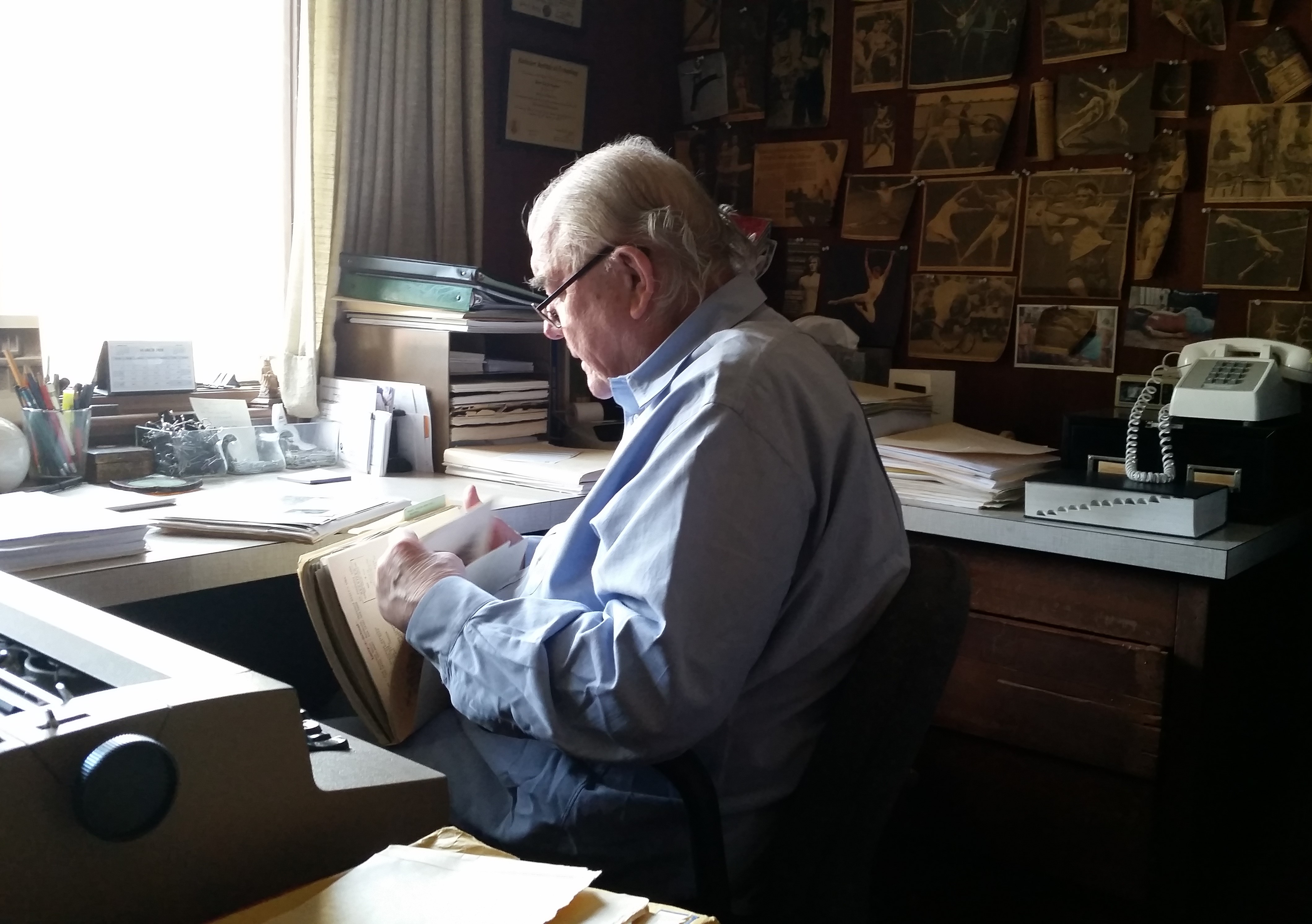
Bunnell at work in his home office in Princeton, New Jersey, 2018

Bunnell joined the Museum of Modern Art staff in New York in 1966, on a temporary assignment to review and catalogue its collection of photographs, and in 1968 became Associate Curator of the Department of Photography. In 1970, he was named the Curator of the Department of Photography at the Museum. Two years later he was invited to teach at Princeton University and was given the position of David Hunter McAlpin Professor of the History of Photography and Modern Art. This was the first endowed professorship in the history of photography in the United States. That same year he curated a show at the museum called Photography into Sculpture, the first comprehensive survey of photographically formed images used in a sculptural manner. The show has been called "one of the great contributions to the history of photography" due to its intent to redefine photography in a new spatial concept.

From 1973 to 1978 Bunnell was also the Director of the Princeton University Art Museum, where he helped build the collection of photographic holdings into "one of the great North American teaching collections." He later served as Curator of the Minor White Archive and as Curator of Photography at Princeton University Art Museum.

In 1979, he was awarded a Guggenheim Foundation Fellowship for further study of the history of photography. Bunnell received a fellowship from the Asian Cultural Council in 1984 that enabled him to travel and lecture extensively in Japan. He returned briefly to Japan in 1995 as a consultant to the National Museum of Modern Art, Tokyo. He later taught at New York University, Dartmouth College, Yale University and the University of Florida.

Bunnell became the acknowledged expert on Minor White's work, and his 1989 book Minor White: The Eye That Shapes still stands as the most complete single source of information on the photographer.

In 2002, Bunnell retired from his post at Princeton. That same year the U.S. Postal Service issued a set of postage stamps called Masters of American Photography featuring photographers and images selected by Bunnell.

In 2011, Princeton University announced the endowment of the Peter C. Bunnell Curatorship in Photography.

In April 2019, Bunnell donated about 110 archival boxes of materials from his personal archive (Peter C. Bunnell Papers) to the Manuscripts Division of the Princeton University Library. The papers donated to the Library complemented a separate gift to the Princeton University Art Museum of more than 30 years of his correspondence and other materials relating to its Minor White and Clarence H. White archival collections.

== Death ==
Bunnell died on September 20, 2021, in Princeton, New Jersey, following a lengthy illness. He was 83.

== Collection ==
In April 2023 Phillips New York auctioned 38 lots entitled A REVERENCE FOR BEAUTY: THE PETER C. BUNNELL COLLECTION. The "remarkable selection of photographs" offered the auction sale's proceeds will be distributed to six institutions with whom Bunnell was associated — Rochester Institute of Technology, Ohio University, Yale University, The George Eastman Museum, The Museum of Modern Art, and Princeton University Art Museum — to establish endowments to support the study of photographic history.

Bunnell's print of Moonrise, Hernandez, New Mexico (1941) was the highest-priced photograph of the auction for an above-estimate $381,000. Bunnell was gifted the large format print from Adams in August 1959 after they had become friends.

Diane Arbus's Identical Twins, Roselle, New Jersey, 1967 sold for $215,900, and a selection by Edward Steichen brought $53,340 - just shy of triple the high estimate. Garry Winogrand's World's Fair, New York City (1964) for $40,640. Also represented in his personal collection were works by Walker Evans, Henri Cartier-Bresson, and of course, his mentor Minor White.

== Publications ==
- Jerry N. Uelsmann: An Aperture Monograph (1970)
- Barbara Morgan (1972)
- Nonsilver Printing Processes: Four Selections 1886–1927 (1973) ISBN 0405049528
- Harry Callahan (1978) ISBN 0847802019
- Altered Landscapes: The Photographs of John Pfahl (1981) ISBN 978-0933286238
- Edward Weston on Photography (1983) ISBN 0879051477
- Clarence H. White: The Reverence for Beauty (1986) ISBN 978-0933041011
- Minor White: The Eye That Shapes (1989) ISBN 978-0943012094
- A Photographic Vision: Pictorial Photography 1889-1923 (1980) ISBN 978-0879050597
- Emmet Gowin: Photographs 1966–1983 (1983)
- EW:100. Centennial Essays in Honor of Edward Weston (1986) ISBN 978-0933286443
- Light Years: The Friends of Photography 1967-1985 (1987) ISBN 978-0933286481
- Alfred Stieglitz: Photographs from the Collection of Georgia O’Keeffe (1993) ISBN
- Degrees of Guidance: Essays on Twentieth-Century American Photography (1993) ISBN 978-0521327510
- Ruth Bernhard: The Collection of Ginny Williams (1993) ISBN 978-1881138044
- Photography at Princeton: Celebrating Twenty-Five Years of Collecting and Teaching the History of Photography (1998) ISBN 978-0943012261
- Edward Ranney Photographs: The John B. Elliott Collection (2003) ISBN 978-0943012391
- Michael Kenna: A Twenty Year Retrospective (2003) ISBN 978-1590050194
- Inside the Photograph: Writings on Twentieth-Century Photography (2006) ISBN 978-1597110211
- Eye Mind Spirit: The Enduring Legacy of Minor White (2009) ISBN 0974886300
- Walter Chappell: Eternal Impermanence (2013) ISBN 8857218724

== Selected exhibitions curated ==
- 1970: Photography into Sculpture, Museum of Modern Art
- 1971: Clarence H. White, Museum of Modern Art
- 1983: The Robert O. Dougan Collection of 19th-Century Photography, Princeton University Art Museum
