= Fur (film) =

2006 drama film by Steven Shainberg

Fur: An Imaginary Portrait of Diane Arbus
- Theatrical release poster
- Directed by: Steven Shainberg
- Screenplay by: Erin Cressida Wilson
- Based on: Diane Arbus: A Biography by Patricia Bosworth
- Produced by: Laura Bickford; Patricia Bosworth; Andrew Fierberg; William Pohlad; Bonnie Timmermann
- Starring: Nicole Kidman; Robert Downey Jr.
- Cinematography: Bill Pope
- Edited by: Kristina Boden; Keiko Deguchi
- Music by: Carter Burwell
- Production company: River Road Entertainment
- Distributed by: Picturehouse
- Release date: November 10, 2006
- Running time: 122 minutes
- Country: United States
- Language: English
- Budget: $16.8 million
- Box office: $2.3 million

Fur: An Imaginary Portrait of Diane Arbus (also known simply as Fur) is a 2006 American romantic drama film directed by Steven Shainberg and written by Erin Cressida Wilson, based on Patricia Bosworth's book Diane Arbus: A Biography. It stars Nicole Kidman as iconic American photographer Diane Arbus, who was known for her strange, disturbing images, and also features Robert Downey Jr. and Ty Burrell. As the title implies, the film is largely fictional.

== Plot ==
In New York City, 1958, Diane Arbus, a mother and housewife, plays assistant to her photographer husband Allan. One night, during a party, she gazes out the window and catches the eye of Lionel Sweeney, a neighbor who recently moved in upstairs. His face is completely covered except for the eyes and mouth. After the party, Diane stands on their patio, opens her dress, and exposes her bra. She admits this to Allan.

Days later, Diane's daughter informs her of a problem with the plumbing. Opening up a pipe, Diane discovers clumps of hair blocking it. As she removes the hair, a key tumbles down. She takes the hair and key out to the trash, and then buzzes Lionel to ask if he was grooming a dog. He says no, and then suggests that she look in the basement. She complies and sees an ornate chair and a sideshow poster of a "wild man," which an armless woman then dusts off. Diane assumes that she is Lionel's wife. When she cannot sleep, Diane grabs a camera that Allan gifted her years before and she never used. Diane goes upstairs, introduces herself to Lionel and asks if she could shoot his portrait. He asks if she got the key and then tells her to return the next night. She leaves and goes to grab the key out of the trash. It is the key to Lionel's apartment.

Lionel has hypertrichosis and is in demand as a wigmaker. He takes Diane to places where she meets transvestites, dwarves, and others living on the fringes of society. Diane tells Allan she would like to take time off from the business (the family's photo studio) to take her own photographs, starting with the neighbors. She starts taking photographs but hides the undeveloped film in a cookie jar.

Lionel asks to be introduced to Allan. Diane instead introduces Lionel to her whole family. Her children help him with his wig-making business, and he reads bedtime stories to them. At her and Allan's anniversary party, Diane finds Lionel breathing in a substance. He admits that his lungs are disintegrating, and within some months he will be "drowning." Moved, they almost kiss, but are interrupted by Allan, who sees their intimate moment and leaves. At home, Allan begs Diane not to tear their family apart. Diane agrees to end the affair, gets dressed and goes upstairs. When she lets herself into Lionel's, she finds him naked with shaving cream and a razor in hand. He asks her to completely shave him. When he is naked, they make love. When she asks why he wanted to be shaved, Lionel reveals that he intends to "swim out," to commit suicide in the ocean, and wants her to be with him when he does it. They profess their love for each other, and Diane takes a picture of Lionel for the first time. Meanwhile, her daughter, having found her film stash, gives it to Allan to develop.

At the beach, Lionel gifts Diane with a fur jacket, made from his own hair. She walks with Lionel to the edge of the water and watches as he gleefully swims out.

Returning to her home, Diane puts the key in the door, but realizes that she cannot return to her old life. Allan, standing on the other side of the door, does nothing. Diane returns to Lionel's apartment, rolls in his bed, and breathes the air he blew into a life raft to inflate it. She is then surrounded by Lionel's friends, who have a party to honor him. One of them gives Diane a photo album Lionel wanted her to have. Its pages have photo plate tags in Lionel's handwriting: while number one is titled "Lionel", for the portrait she took of him, he wants her to fill the rest of the pages with new photographs.

Diane realizes what direction to take with her life and career. At a nudist camp, Diane wants to take the picture of a woman, but first asks her to tell a secret. Diane is asked to do it first, and she agrees.

== Cast ==
- Nicole Kidman as Diane Arbus
- Robert Downey Jr. as Lionel Sweeney
- Ty Burrell as Allan Arbus
- Harris Yulin as David Nemerov, chairman of Russeks
- Jane Alexander as Gertrude Nemerov
- Emmy Clarke as Grace Arbus
- Genevieve McCarthy as Sophie Arbus
- Boris McGiver as Jack Henry
- Marceline Hugot as Tippa Henry
- Emily Bergl as Allan's New Assistant
- Lynn Marie Stetson as Fiona (Naked Girl)
- Christina Rouner as Lois
- Mary Duffy as Althea
- Agnes 'Peppermint' Moore

== Production ==
For the film, director Shainberg, best known for his erotic comedy drama film Secretary, reunited with its screenwriter, Erin Cressida Wilson, who used Patricia Bosworth's Diane Arbus: A Biography as a source. As its name implies, the film is a fictional account rather than an accurate biography. Mark Romanek had previously tried to direct and write a film based on Bosworth's biography for DreamWorks Pictures.

No pictures by Arbus herself are featured, as her estate refused approval.

=== Locations ===
The nudist camp of Camp Venus was shot at Sailors' Snug Harbor in Staten Island.

== Reception ==
The film holds a score of 50 on Metacritic, and holds a 33% from 109 reviews on Rotten Tomatoes, with the critics consensus reading, "This portrait of a groundbreaking photographer lacks the daring of its subject."

The Chicago Tribune gave the film three out of four stars: "The result is a revelatory, challenging and deeply affecting portrait, anchored by what may be Kidman's most profoundly moving performance."

The Los Angeles Times criticized the "cop-out ending that undercuts its message about the unimportance of surface differences in favor of a glib finalities to have its cake and eat it too". Despite this, the newspaper continued to heap praise on Kidman and Downey Jr; "the remarkable acting of its two stars pulls you back in and keeps you watching. Kidman, the most consistently daring of today's top stars, is exceptionally convincing as someone whose interior process plays out in front of us. And Downey, for the most part using only his soulful, yearning eyes and a silky, urbane voice, creates a man no one could resist. Separately and together, they make us believe the unbelievable."

== Soundtrack ==
The soundtrack to Fur was released on November 14, 2006.

No.	Title	Artist	Length
1.	"The Fur"	Carter Burwell	3:11
2.	"Tango de la Bête"	Carter Burwell	1:23
3.	"Scary Times"	Carter Burwell	1:38
4.	"Arbus Family Photo Studio"	Carter Burwell	1:53
5.	"My Arms Around Myself"	Carter Burwell	1:54
6.	"Exposure"	Carter Burwell	0:57
7.	"Seduction"	Carter Burwell	1:09
8.	"Pipes"	Carter Burwell	1:36
9.	"Ad Ultima Thule"	Carter Burwell	3:30
10.	"Call of the Wild"	Carter Burwell	1:06
11.	"The Tea Party"	Carter Burwell	2:08
12.	"Following"	Carter Burwell	1:58
13.	"The Run Back Home"	Carter Burwell	1:16
14.	"Water Dream"	Carter Burwell	3:13
15.	"Stepping Out"	Carter Burwell	1:04
16.	"A Dead Person"	Carter Burwell	1:19
17.	"Trap Door Party"	Carter Burwell	1:13
18.	"Drowning"	Carter Burwell	1:36
19.	"End It"	Carter Burwell	1:22
20.	"Transmission"	Carter Burwell	2:28
21.	"The Shave"	Carter Burwell	5:22
22.	"Into The Sea"	Carter Burwell	5:03
23.	"I Want to Meet Your Husband"	Carter Burwell	0:53
Total length:			47:12
