= Identical Twins, Roselle, New Jersey, 1967 =

Photograph by Diane Arbus

Diane Arbus photograph, Identical Twins, Roselle, New Jersey, 1967.

Identical Twins, Roselle, New Jersey, 1967 is a noted photograph by photographer Diane Arbus from the United States.

Since its debut Identical twins, Roselle, N. J., has become the image most closely associated with her large body of work. The photograph was chosen as the cover illustration for what was, for many years, Arbus’s only retrospective monograph: Diane Arbus, published by Aperture in 1972. It embodies a culmination of the strongest themes in her work, namely her fascinations with children, aberrance, and identity, among them.

== History ==
Diane Arbus was known for her photographs of outsiders and people on the fringes of society. She often shot with a Rolleiflex medium format twin-lens reflex that provided a square aspect ratio and a waist-level viewfinder. The viewfinder allowed Arbus to connect with her subjects in ways that a standard eye-level viewfinder did not.

== Significance ==
Identical Twins depicts young twin sisters, Cathleen and Colleen Wade, standing side by side in matching corduroy dresses, white tights, and white headbands in their dark hair. Both stare into the camera, one slightly smiles and the other slightly frowns. The photo has been said to sum up Arbus' vision. Biographer Patricia Bosworth said, "She was involved in the question of identity. Who am I and who are you? The twin image expresses the crux of that vision: normality in freakishness and the freakishness in normality." Arbus' inquiry into identity reaches a climax in this photograph with the noticeable tension between the girls' being twins and individuals at the same time. Their extreme closeness, the uniformity of their clothing and haircut underline their close bond while the facial expressions strongly emphasise their individuality.

The twins were seven years old when Arbus spotted them at a Christmas party for twins and triplets. The twins' father once said about the photo, "We thought it was the worst likeness of the twins we'd ever seen."

== In popular culture ==
The photo has also inspired other art. Most notably, it is said to be echoed in Stanley Kubrick's horror film The Shining (1980), which features the twin Grady sisters in similar dress and pose. It is also briefly referenced in Harmony Korine's Gummo and in an episode of the television series Psych: "The Old and the Restless". It also appears in A Simple Favor, a novel by Darcey Bell, where it hangs above the mantel in one of the main characters' home.

== Art market ==
In 2004, a print of the photo was sold at Sotheby's in New York for $478,000. It is also one of a set of recreated iconic portraits through photographic history by the photographer Sandro Miller using John Malkovich as the actor in each portrait.

Peter Bunnell's 25.4 cm x 26 cm print was sold at the Phillips auction in April 2023, for a near-high $215,900. Bunnell’s print is titled and dated by the photographer. The purposely diffuse edges of the image are a hallmark of Arbus’s mature printing style in which she employed a filed-out negative carrier while making prints in the darkroom.

== See also ==
- Child with Toy Hand Grenade in Central Park
