= Doon Arbus =

American writer and journalist (born 1945)

- Born: April 3, 1945 (age 81); New York City, U.S.
- Occupations: Writer, journalist
- Years active: 1965–present
- Parents: Allan Arbus; Diane Arbus
- Relatives: Amy Arbus (sister); Arin Arbus (half-sister); Frank Russek (great-grandfather); Howard Nemerov (maternal uncle); Alexander Nemerov (maternal first cousin)

Doon Arbus (born April 3, 1945) is an American writer and journalist. Her debut novel is The Caretaker (New Directions, 2020). Her play, Third Floor, Second Door on the Right, was produced at the Cherry Lane Theatre by the 2003 New York International Fringe Festival.

Doon Arbus is the elder daughter of actor Allan Arbus and photographer Diane Arbus, and the great-granddaughter of Russeks co-founder Frank Russek. She was 26 when her mother committed suicide, at which time she became responsible for the management of her mother's estate. She has authored or contributed to five books on Diane Arbus's work, including An Aperture Monograph (Aperture, 1972) and Revelations (Random House, 2003). She has also organized numerous photographic exhibitions in collaboration with The Metropolitan Museum of Art, the San Francisco Museum of Modern Art, and the Jeu de Paume, among other institutions.

As a freelance journalist in the mid-1960s, alongside other writers like Tom Wolfe, Jimmy Breslin, and Robert Benton, she contributed to the New York Herald Tribune's Sunday supplement, New York, one of the earliest proponents of New Journalism. Her articles also appeared in Rolling Stone, The Nation, and Cheetah. Her 1966 New York Herald Tribune article "James Brown Is Out of Sight" was among the first profiles of the R&B legend and is included in The James Brown Reader (Plume, 2008). Arbus was a longtime collaborator of Richard Avedon, with whom she coauthored the books Alice in Wonderland: The Forming of a Company, the Making of a Play (E. P. Dutton, 1973) and Avedon: The Sixties (Random House, 1999).

== Published work ==
=== Selected articles and criticism ===
- "James Brown Is Out of Sight", New York/The Sunday Herald Tribune Magazine, 1966
- "The Man in the Paper Suit: James Rosenquist", New York/The Sunday World Journal Tribune Magazine, (1966)
- "In Person: The Mothers of Invention", Cheetah, 1967
- "The Autobiography of Michael J. Pollard", Cheetah, 1968
- "Dustin Hoffman: I'm Sorry I Couldn't Be Here Tonight", Cheetah, 1968
- "How Fat Alice Lost 12 Stone (Yes 12 Stone—the Weight of An Average Man!) and Found Happiness, God, and the Chance of a Husband", The London Sunday Times Magazine, 1969
- "Diane Arbus Photographer", Ms. Magazine, 1972
- "Walker Evans: Allusions to a Presence", The Nation, 1978
- "The Collector: Photographer Peter Beard's Wild Life and Times", Rolling Stone, 1978

=== Books ===
- Diane Arbus: An Aperture Monograph (editor and co-designer). New York: Aperture, 1972
- Alice in Wonderland: The Forming of a Company, the Making of a Play (coauthor). New York: E. P. Dutton, 1973
- Magazine Work (editor). New York: Aperture, 1984
- Untitled: Diane Arbus (editor, contributor, and co-designer). New York: Aperture, 1995
- Avedon: The Sixties (coauthor). New York: Random House, 1999
- Diane Arbus Revelations (author), New York: Random House, 2003
- Diane Arbus: A Chronology, 1923–1971 (author). New York: Aperture, 2011
- The Caretaker: A Novel (author). New York: New Directions, 2020
