= Howard Nemerov =

American poet

- Born: February 29, 1920; New York City, U.S.
- Died: July 5, 1991 (aged 71); University City, Missouri, U.S.
- Education: Harvard University (BA)
- Occupation: Poet
- Children: 3, including Alexander Nemerov
- Relatives: Diane Arbus (sister); Doon Arbus (niece); Amy Arbus (niece)
- Writing career
- Notable awards: National Book Award; 1978; Pulitzer Prize; 1978

Howard Nemerov (February 29, 1920 – July 5, 1991) was an American poet. Nemerov was the Edward Mallinckrodt Distinguished University Professor of English and Distinguished Poet in Residence at Washington University in St. Louis. He was twice Poet Laureate Consultant in Poetry to the Library of Congress, from 1963 to 1964 and again from 1988 to 1990. For The Collected Poems of Howard Nemerov (1977), he won the National Book Award for Poetry, Pulitzer Prize for Poetry, and Bollingen Prize.

== Biography ==
Nemerov was born on February 29, 1920, in New York City; his parents were David Nemerov (who among other things was a national director of the Anti Defamation League of B'nai B'rith) and Gertrude Russek. The Nemerovs were a Russian Jewish couple who lived in New York City and he rose to become chairman of Russeks, a Fifth Avenue women's wear department store. Howard's younger sisters were the photographer Diane Arbus and sculptor/painter Renee Nemerov Sparkia Brown. Their father's interests extended to art connoisseurship, painting, philanthropy, and photography. Howard was raised in a sophisticated Upper West Side environment with his sisters where he attended the Society for Ethical Culture's Fieldston School. Graduated in 1937 as an outstanding student and second-string team football fullback, he commenced studies at Harvard University where, in 1940, he was Bowdoin Essayist, and he received a bachelor's degree. Throughout World War II, he served as a pilot, first in the Royal Canadian Air Force and later the U.S. Army Air Forces. He married in 1944, and after the war, having earned the rank of first lieutenant, returned to New York with his wife to complete his first book.

Nemerov then began teaching, first at Hamilton College and later at Bennington College, Brandeis University, and finally Washington University in St. Louis, where he was Edward Mallinckrodt Distinguished University Professor of English and Distinguished Poet in Residence from 1969 until his death in 1991. In 1999, Washington University dedicated a dormitory, The Howard Nemerov House, to him. Nemerov's numerous collections of poetry include Trying Conclusions: New and Selected Poems, 1961-1991 (University of Chicago Press, 1991); The Collected Poems of Howard Nemerov (1977), which won the Pulitzer Prize, the National Book Award, and the Bollingen Prize; The Winter Lightning: Selected Poems (1968); Mirrors and Windows (1958); The Salt Garden (1955); and The Image and the Law (1947). His novels have also been commended; they include The Homecoming Game (1957), Federigo: Or the Power of Love (1954), and The Melodramatists (1949).

Nemerov received many awards and honors, among them fellowships from The Academy of American Poets and The Guggenheim Foundation, a National Endowment for the Arts grant, the National Medal of Arts, the Bollingen Prize for Poetry, the St. Louis Literary Award from the Saint Louis University Library Associates, the Golden Plate Award of the American Academy of Achievement, and the first Aiken Taylor Award for Modern American Poetry.

Nemerov served as poetry consultant to the Library of Congress in 1963 and 1964, as a Chancellor of the Academy of American Poets beginning in 1976, and two terms as poet laureate of the United States from 1988 to 1990. In 1990 he was inducted into the St. Louis Walk of Fame. Nemerov died of cancer in 1991 in University City, Missouri. The Howard Nemerov Sonnet Award was instituted in 1994 to honor him, and by 2008 about 3000 sonnets were entered annually in the associated competition.

== Poetry ==
Nemerov's work is formalist. He wrote almost exclusively in fixed forms and meter. While he is known for his meticulousness and refined technique, his work also has a reputation for being witty and playful. He is compared to John Hollander and Philip Larkin.

"A Primer of the Daily Round" is his most frequently anthologized poem, and highly representative of Nemerov's poetic style. It is an archetypal Elizabethan sonnet, demonstrative of the prosodic creativity for which Nemerov is famous. Another widely appreciated poem is "The War in the Air," which draws on his wartime experience as a pilot.

Nemerov's "Because You Asked about the Line between Prose and Poetry" is frequently taught as an example of an Ars Poetica as it describes the nearly imperceptible change between rain and snow while still maintaining the formal poetic elements of rhyme and meter. A critical review by Mary Kinzie said of it: "the poem imperceptibly thickens itself out of the stream of prose."

Nemerov also published a short story in the book Stories Selected from the Unexpected by Bennett Cerf under the pseudonym Joseph Cross called "Exchange of Men". http://www.philsp.com/homeville/anth/s194.htm

== Personal life ==
Nemerov was brother to photographer Diane Nemerov Arbus and father to art historian Alexander Nemerov, Professor of the History of Art and American Studies at Stanford University.

One of Nemerov's hobbies were whistling, something he did often while working and while a student at Bennington College.

== Bibliography ==
=== Poetry collections ===
- The Image and the Law (1947)
- Guide to the Ruins (1950)
- The Vacuum (1955)
- The Salt Garden (1955)
- Mirrors and Windows (1958)
- The Next Room of The Dream: Poems and Two Plays (1962)
- The Blue Swallows (1967)
- The Winter Lightning: Selected Poems (1968)
- Gnomes & Occasions: Poems (1973) University of Chicago Press ISBN 0-226-57252-8
- The Collected Poems of Howard Nemerov (1977) ISBN 978-0-226-57259-8 — winner of the National Book Award, Pulitzer Prize, and Bollingen Prize
- Sentences (1980) ISBN 978-0-226-57262-8
- Inside the Onion (1984) ISBN 0-226-57244-7
- War Stories: Poems about Long Ago and Now (1987) ISBN 978-0-226-57243-7
- Trying Conclusions: New and Selected Poems, 1961-1991 (1992) ISBN 978-0-226-57263-5
- Grace to be Said at the Supermarket
- The War in the Air

=== Prose ===
- The Melodramatists (1949)
- Federigo: Or the Power of Love (1954)
- The Homecoming Game (1957)
- The Commodity of Dreams and Other Stories (1959)
- Journal of the Fictive Life (1965) ISBN 978-0-226-57261-1
- Stories, Fables and Other Diversions (1971)

=== Literary scholarship ===
- The Oak in the Acorn: On Remembrance of Things Past and on Teaching Proust, Who Will Never Learn (1987) ISBN 978-0-8071-1385-1

=== About Howard Nemerov ===
- Rodney Stenning Edgecombe. A Reader's Guide to the Poetry of Howard Nemerov (Poetry Salzburg, 1999) ISBN 978-3-901993-07-7
