= Arthur Lubow =

American journalist (born 1952)

- Born: September 18, 1952 (age 73)
- Education: Bronx High School of Science; Harvard College
- Occupations: Journalist; author
- Website: arthurlubow.com

Arthur Lubow (born September 18, 1952) is an American journalist who has written for national magazines since 1975 and is the author of Diane Arbus: Portrait of a Photographer (2016).

== Early life and education ==
Lubow grew up in the Bronx and attended the Bronx High School of Science. At Harvard College, from which he graduated in 1974, he was managing editor of The Harvard Crimson. He studied at Cambridge University on a Knox Fellowship from autumn 1974 to spring 1975.

== Career ==
Lubow began his career as a staff writer for New Times, a now defunct general interest biweekly; he wrote there about a wide array of subjects, including New German cinema, genetic engineering and President Ford’s environmental policy.

He was a senior writer at People from 1979 to 1984, where his profile subjects included Oliver Sacks, John Travolta, Paul Theroux, Brian Eno and Pauline Kael.

A contributing editor at Vanity Fair from 1991 to 1992, he mainly wrote stories on writers, including Gay Talese, Gore Vidal and Stephen Hawking.

When Tina Brown left Vanity Fair as the editor-in-chief of Vanity Fair for The New Yorker, he was part of a small group of writers asked to accompany her. He worked as a staff writer at The New Yorker from 1992 to 1993, and continued thereafter to contribute to the magazine as a freelancer, on subjects that include the playwright Tony Kushner, biographical film projects on Jackson Pollock, and the creation of an advertising campaign for Stolichnaya vodka.

From 2002 to 2014, Lubow was a contributing writer at The New York Times Magazine, writing mainly on cultural topics, including the artist Takashi Murakami, the chef Ferran Adria, the conductors Valery Gergiev and Gustavo Dudamel, the composer Arvo Part, the photographer Jeff Wall, the novelist Penelope Fitzgerald, the architects Rem Koolhaas, Thom Mayne, Jean Nouvel and SANAA, and the battle between Yale University and Peru over artifacts from Machu Picchu.

He has also written frequently for Smithsonian, Departures, W and The Threepenny Review.

Lubow wrote the first American feature story on the now legendary English singer-songwriter Nick Drake in 1978. His earlier book, The Reporter Who Would Be King: A Biography of Richard Harding Davis, was published by Scribners in 1992. He has contributed to books on the artist Liza Lou and the writer W.G. Sebald.

In 2016 Ecco Press published Lubow's book Diane Arbus: Portrait of a Photographer. The book grew out of a cover story on Arbus that appeared in The New York Times Magazine in September 2003.

== Personal life ==
Lubow lives in New York City and East Haddam, Connecticut.

== Publications ==
- Diane Arbus: Portrait of a Photographer. New York: Ecco Press, 2016. ISBN 978-0-06-223432-2.
- Man Ray: The Artist and his Shadows.. Yale University Press, 2021. ISBN 978-0-30-023721-4.
- The Reporter Who Would Be King: A Biography of Richard Harding Davis. Scribner Book Company, 1992. ISBN 978-0-684-19404-2.

== Honors and awards ==
- 1984: National Endowment for the Humanities Fellowship
- 1999: James Beard Award, "Journalism - Magazine Restaurant Review or Critique" category
- First Prize of the Spanish Academy of Gastronomy in 2003.
- Fellow of the New York Institute for the Humanities
- 2013-14: Fellow at the Dorothy and Lewis B. Cullman Center for Writers and Scholars at the New York Public Library
