= Carl & Marilynn Thoma Art Foundation =

American art foundation located in Dallas, TX and Santa Fe, New Mexico

The Carl & Marilynn Thoma Foundation is an American art foundation located in Santa Fe, New Mexico and Dallas, Texas. The foundation exhibits work in its Santa Fe Art Vault, lends work for touring exhibitions from its permanent collection, and funds various artistic and criticism initiatives through grant programs.

== History ==
The foundation was formed by Carl Thoma and Marilynn Thoma in 2014. The Thomas donated their personal collection of over 1500 works, which they had begun collecting in 1975, to the foundation. The foundation's collection focuses primarily on three areas: digital art, Spanish Colonial art and Japanese contemporary painting and sculpture. The value of the foundation's assets were reported to be US$79 million in 2015.

== Grants and awards ==
The foundation administers an award for writers who specialize in digital art. The Thoma foundation also offers scholarships to graduate students conducting research and writing about Spanish Colonial art. In 2019 the foundation awarded US$159,000 for the scholarship of Spanish colonial art. The same year, the Thoma foundation awarded US$500,000 to the Museum of Contemporary Art Cleveland support its initiative to offer free admission to its galleries.

In some cases the foundation has funded thematic exhibitions on subjects related to its collections, such as the 2018 Chicago Museum of Contemporary Art exhibition I Was Raised on the Internet.

== Exhibition activities ==
In Santa Fe New Mexico, the foundation operates a gallery on Canyon road called Art House, where it exhibits works from its permanent collection. The Thoma foundation also frequently loans items from its collection for museum exhibitions. The collection is also shown in Chicago by appointment, in its own warehouse and exhibition space called the Orange Door.
