= New Documents =

1967 art exhibition at New York's Museum of Modern Art

New Documents was an influential documentary photography exhibition at Museum of Modern Art, New York, in 1967, curated by John Szarkowski. It presented photographs by Diane Arbus, Lee Friedlander and Garry Winogrand and is said to have "represented a shift in emphasis" and "identified a new direction in photography: pictures that seemed to have a casual, snapshot-like look and subject matter so apparently ordinary that it was hard to categorize".

== Details ==
The work in the exhibition, "documentary photography, but not as it was then known or understood", was "considered radical at the time" and "out of step with the times". Critics, such as Jacob Deschin writing in The New York Times, were sceptical. Neither Arbus, Friedlander nor Winogrand "was well known at the time but all of them came to be considered among the leading talents of their generation" and "considered among the most decisive for the generations of photographers that followed them."

Robert Frank's influential book of photographs, The Americans, was published in 1958. In the wall text for New Documents, John Szarkowski "suggested that until then the aim of documentary photography had been to show what was wrong with the world, as a way to generate interest in rectifying it. But this show signaled a change. 'In the past decade a new generation of photographers has directed the documentary approach toward more personal ends,' he wrote. 'Their aim has been not to reform life, but to know it.'" The photographs of Friedlander and Winogrand were closer to each other than the work of Arbus was to either of them. Szarkowski explained that what "unites these three photographers is not style or sensibility; each has a distinct and personal sense of the use of photography and the meanings of the world. What is held in common is the belief that the world is worth looking at, and the courage to look at it without theorizing." This was "photography that emphasized the pathos and conflicts of modern life presented without editorializing or sentimentalizing but with a critical, observant eye."

New Documents comprised 94 black-and-white photographs (32 by Arbus, 30 by Friedlander and 32 by Winogrand) shot using 35 mm hand-held film cameras. A carousel tray of 80 35 mm colour slides by Winogrand was also included at venues other than MoMA where it was removed because of technical difficulties.

The exhibition was shown at Museum of Modern Art, New York from 28 February until 7 May 1967 and then toured to Goucher College, Townson, Maryland; McMaster University, Connecticut; State University of New York, Buffalo; Cornell University, Ithaca, New York; Long Island University, Brooklyn; Dartmouth College, Hanover, New Hampshire; Concordia College, River Forest, Illinois; Wittenburg University, Springfield, Ohio; University of Missouri, Columbia; Krannert Art Museum, University of Illinois, Champaign; Amherst College, Massachusetts; Wesleyan University, Middleton, Connecticut; University of Notre Dame, Indiana; and San Francisco Museum of Art, San Francisco.

== Related publication ==
- Arbus / Friedlander / Winogrand: New Documents, 1967. New York: Museum of Modern Art, 2017. ISBN 978-0870709555. Includes the 94 photographs included in the exhibition, Szarkowski's original wall text, MoMA press release, photographs of the exhibition, archival material, and essays by Sarah Hermanson Meister and Max Kozloff.

== See also ==
- Snapshot aesthetic
- Street photography
