= Diane Arbus =

American photographer (1923–1971)

- Arbus c. 1941
- Born: Diane Nemerov; March 14, 1923; New York City, U.S.
- Died: July 26, 1971 (aged 48); New York City, U.S.
- Occupation: Photographer
- Spouse: Allan Arbus (m. 1941; div. 1969)
- Partner: Marvin Israel (1959–1971; her death)
- Children: Doon; Amy
- Relatives: Howard Nemerov (brother); Alexander Nemerov (nephew); Frank Russek (grandfather)

Diane Arbus (/diːˈæn ˈɑːrbəs/; née Nemerov; March 14, 1923 – July 26, 1971) was an American photographer. She photographed a wide range of subjects including strippers, carnival performers, nudists, people with dwarfism, children, mothers, couples, elderly people, and middle-class families. She photographed her subjects in familiar settings: their homes, on the street, in the workplace, in the park. "She is noted for expanding notions of acceptable subject matter and violates canons of the appropriate distance between photographer and subject. By befriending, not objectifying her subjects, she was able to capture in her work a rare psychological intensity."

In his 2003 New York Times Magazine article, "Arbus Reconsidered", Arthur Lubow states, "She was fascinated by people who were visibly creating their own identities—cross-dressers, nudists, sideshow performers, tattooed men, the nouveaux riches, the movie-star fans—and by those who were trapped in a uniform that no longer provided any security or comfort." Michael Kimmelman writes in his review of the exhibition Diane Arbus Revelations, that her work "transformed the art of photography (Arbus is everywhere, for better and worse, in the work of artists today who make photographs)".

In her lifetime she achieved some recognition and renown with the publication, beginning in 1960, of photographs in such magazines as Esquire, Harper's Bazaar, London's Sunday Times Magazine, and Artforum. In 1963 the Guggenheim Foundation awarded Arbus a fellowship for her proposal entitled, "American Rites, Manners and Customs". She was awarded a renewal of her fellowship in 1966. John Szarkowski, the director of photography at the Museum of Modern Art (MoMA) in New York City from 1962 to 1991, championed her work and included it in his 1967 exhibit New Documents along with the work of Lee Friedlander and Garry Winogrand. Her photographs were also included in a number of other major group shows.

In 1972, a year after her suicide, Arbus became the first photographer to be included in the Venice Biennale where her photographs were "the overwhelming sensation of the American Pavilion" and "extremely powerful and very strange".

The first major retrospective of Arbus's work was held in 1972 at MoMA, organized by Szarkowski. The retrospective garnered the highest attendance of any exhibition in MoMA's history to date. Millions viewed traveling exhibitions of her work from 1972 to 1979. The book accompanying the exhibition, Diane Arbus: An Aperture Monograph, edited by Doon Arbus and Marvin Israel and first published in 1972, has never been out of print.

== Early life and education ==
Arbus was born Diane Nemerov to David Nemerov and Gertrude Russek Nemerov, Jewish immigrants from Soviet Russia and Poland, who lived in New York City and raised Arbus and her siblings on the Upper West Side. They owned Russeks, a Fifth Avenue women's wear department store, co-founded by Arbus's grandfather Frank Russek, a Polish-Jewish immigrant to the United States. David rose to become chairman of the store. Because of her family's wealth, Arbus was insulated from the effects of the Great Depression while growing up in the 1930s. Her father became a painter after retiring from Russeks. Her younger sister became a sculptor and designer, and her older brother, the poet Howard Nemerov, taught English at Washington University in St. Louis and was appointed United States Poet Laureate. Howard's son is the Americanist art historian Alexander Nemerov.

Arbus's parents were not deeply involved in raising their children, who were overseen by maids and governesses. Her mother had a busy social life and underwent a period of clinical depression for approximately a year, then recovered, and her father was busy with work. Diane separated herself from her family and her lavish childhood.

Arbus attended the Ethical Culture Fieldston School, a college-preparatory school.

== Career ==
Arbus received her first camera, a Graflex, from her husband, Allan, shortly after they married. Shortly thereafter, she enrolled in classes with photographer Berenice Abbott. The Arbuses' interests in photography led them, in 1941, to visit the gallery of Alfred Stieglitz, and learn about the photographers Mathew Brady, Timothy O'Sullivan, Paul Strand, Bill Brandt, and Eugène Atget. In the early 1940s, Diane's father employed Diane and Allan to take photographs for the department store's advertisements. Allan was a photographer for the U.S. Army Signal Corps in World War II.

In 1946, after the war, the Arbuses began a commercial photography business called "Diane & Allan Arbus", with Diane as art director and Allan as the photographer. She would come up with the concepts for their shoots and then take care of the models. She grew dissatisfied with this role, a role even her husband thought was "demeaning". They contributed to Glamour, Seventeen, Vogue, and other magazines even though "they both hated the fashion world". Despite over 200 pages of their fashion editorial in Glamour, and over 80 pages in Vogue, the Arbuses' fashion photography has been described as of "middling quality". Edward Steichen's noted 1955 photography exhibition, The Family of Man, did include a photograph by the Arbuses of a father and son reading a newspaper.

She studied briefly with Alexey Brodovich in 1954. However, it was her studies with Lisette Model, which began in 1956, that encouraged Arbus to focus exclusively on her own work. That year Arbus quit the commercial photography business and began numbering her negatives. (Her last known negative was labeled #7459.) Based on Model's advice, Arbus spent time with an empty camera so she could practice observation. Arbus also credits Model with making it clear to her that "the more specific you are, the more general it'll be."

By 1956 she worked with a 35mm Nikon, wandering the streets of New York City and meeting her subjects largely, though not always, by chance. The idea of personal identity as socially constructed is one that Arbus came back to, whether it be performers, women and men wearing makeup, or a literal mask obstructing one's face. Critics have speculated that the choices in her subjects reflected her own identity issues, for she said that the only thing she suffered from as a child was never having felt adversity. This evolved into a longing for things that money couldn't buy, such as experiences in the underground social world. She is often praised for her sympathy for these subjects, a quality which is not immediately understood through the images themselves, but through her writing and the testimonies of the men and women she portrayed. A few years later, in 1958 she began making lists of who and what she was interested in photographing. She began photographing on assignment for magazines such as Esquire, Harper's Bazaar, and The Sunday Times Magazine in 1959.

Around 1962, Arbus switched from a 35 mm Nikon camera which produced the grainy rectangular images characteristic of her post-studio work to a twin-lens reflex Rolleiflex camera which produced more detailed square images. She explained this transition saying "In the beginning of photographing I used to make very grainy things. I'd be fascinated by what the grain did because it would make a kind of tapestry of all these little dots ... But when I'd been working for a while with all these dots, I suddenly wanted terribly to get through there. I wanted to see the real differences between things ... I began to get terribly hyped on clarity." In 1964, Arbus began using a 2-1/4 Mamiyaflex camera with flash in addition to the Rolleiflex.

Arbus's style is described as "direct and unadorned, a frontal portrait centered in a square format. Her pioneering use of flash in daylight isolated the subjects from the background, which contributed to the photos' surreal quality." Her methods included establishing a strong personal relationship with her subjects and re-photographing some of them over many years.

In spite of being widely published and achieving some artistic recognition, Arbus struggled to support herself through her work. "During her lifetime, there was no market for collecting photographs as works of art, and her prints usually sold for $100 or less." It is evident from her correspondence that lack of money was a persistent concern.

In 1963, Arbus was awarded a Guggenheim Fellowship for a project on "American rites, manners, and customs"; the fellowship was renewed in 1966.

Throughout the 1960s, Arbus supported herself largely by taking magazine assignments and commissions. For example, in 1968 she shot documentary photographs of poor sharecroppers in rural South Carolina (for Esquire magazine). In 1969 a rich and prominent actor and theater owner, Konrad Matthaei, and his wife, Gay, commissioned Arbus to photograph a family Christmas gathering. During her career, Arbus photographed Mae West, Ozzie Nelson and Harriet Nelson, Bennett Cerf, atheist Madalyn Murray O'Hair, Norman Mailer, Jayne Mansfield, Eugene McCarthy, billionaire H. L. Hunt, Gloria Vanderbilt's baby Anderson Cooper, Coretta Scott King, and Marguerite Oswald (Lee Harvey Oswald's mother). In general, her magazine assignments decreased as her fame as an artist increased. Szarkowski hired Arbus in 1970 to research an exhibition on photojournalism called "From the Picture Press"; it included many photographs by Weegee whose work Arbus admired. She also taught photography at the Parsons School of Design and the Cooper Union in New York City, and the Rhode Island School of Design in Providence, Rhode Island.

Late in her career, the Metropolitan Museum of Art indicated to her that they would buy three of her photographs for $75 each, but citing a lack of funds, purchased only two. As she wrote to Allan Arbus, "So I guess being poor is no disgrace."

Beginning in 1969 Arbus undertook a series of photographs of people at New Jersey residences for developmentally and intellectually disabled people, posthumously named Untitled. Arbus returned to several facilities repeatedly for Halloween parties, picnics, and dances. In a letter to Allan Arbus dated November 28, 1969, she described these photographs as "lyric and tender and pretty".

Artforum published six photographs, including a cover image, from Arbus's portfolio, A box of ten photographs, in May 1971. After his encounter with Arbus and the portfolio, Philip Leider, then editor in chief of Artforum and a photography skeptic, admitted, "With Diane Arbus, one could find oneself interested in photography or not, but one could no longer . . . deny its status as art." She was the first photographer to be featured in Artforum and "Leider's admission of Arbus into this critical bastion of late modernism was instrumental in shifting the perception of photography and ushering its acceptance into the realm of 'serious' art."

The first major exhibition of her photographs occurred at the Museum of Modern Art in the influential New Documents (1967) alongside the work of Garry Winogrand and Lee Friedlander, curated by John Szarkowski. New Documents, which drew almost 250,000 visitors demonstrated Arbus's interest in what Szarkowski referred to as society's "frailties" and presented what he described as "a new generation of documentary photographers ... whose aim has been not to reform life but to know it", described elsewhere as "photography that emphasized the pathos and conflicts of modern life presented without editorializing or sentimentalizing but with a critical, observant eye". The show was polarizing, receiving both praise and criticism, with some identifying Arbus as a disinterested voyeur and others praising her for her evident empathy with her subjects.

In 2018, The New York Times published a belated obituary of Arbus as part of the Overlooked history project. The Smithsonian American Art Museum (SAAM) housed an exclusive exhibit from April 6, 2018, to January 27, 2019, that featured one of Arbus's portfolios, A box of ten photographs. The SAAM is the only museum currently displaying the work. The collection is "one of just four complete editions that Arbus printed and annotated. The three other editions—the artist never executed her plan to make 50—are held privately". The Smithsonian edition was made for Bea Feitler, an art director who both employed and befriended Arbus. After Feitler's death, Baltimore collector G. H. Dalsheimer bought her portfolio from Sotheby's in 1982 for $42,900. The SAAM then bought it from Dalsheimer in 1986. The portfolio was put away in the museum's collection, until 2018.

== Personal life ==
In 1941, at the age of 18, she married her childhood sweetheart, Allan Arbus, whom she had dated since age 14. Their daughter Doon, who would become a writer, was born in 1945; their daughter Amy, who would become a photographer, was born in 1954. Arbus and her husband worked together in commercial photography from 1946 to 1956, but Allan remained very supportive of her work even after she left the business and began an independent relationship to photography.

Arbus and her husband separated in 1959, although they maintained a close friendship. The couple also continued to share a darkroom, where Allan's studio assistants processed her negatives, and she printed her work. The couple divorced in 1969 when he moved to California to pursue acting. After Diane’s death, Allan became well-known for his role as Dr. Sidney Freedman, a United States Army psychiatrist, on the television show M*A*S*H. Before his move to California, Allan set up Diane’s darkroom, and they thereafter maintained a long correspondence.

In late 1959, Arbus began a relationship with the art director and painter Marvin Israel that would last until her death. All the while, he remained married to Margaret Ponce Israel, an accomplished mixed-media artist. Marvin Israel both spurred Arbus creatively and championed her work, encouraging her to create her first portfolio. Richard Avedon was among the photographers and artists Arbus befriended; he was approximately the same age, his family had also run a Fifth Avenue department store, and many of his photographs were also characterized by detailed frontal poses.

== Death ==
Arbus experienced "depressive episodes" during her life, similar to those experienced by her mother; the episodes may have been made worse by symptoms of hepatitis. In 1968, Arbus wrote a letter to a friend, Carlotta Marshall, that says: "I go up and down a lot. Maybe I've always been like that. Partly what happens though is I get filled with energy and joy and I begin lots of things or think about what I want to do and get all breathless with excitement and then quite suddenly either through tiredness or a disappointment or something more mysterious the energy vanishes, leaving me harassed, swamped, distraught, frightened by the very things I thought I was so eager for! I'm sure this is quite classic." Her ex-husband once noted that she had "violent changes of mood".

On July 26, 1971, while living at Westbeth Artists Community in New York City, Arbus died by suicide by ingesting barbiturates and cutting her wrists with a razor. She wrote the words "Last Supper" in her diary and placed her appointment book on the stairs leading up to the bathroom. Marvin Israel found her body in the bathtub two days later; she was 48 years old. Photographer Joel Meyerowitz told journalist Arthur Lubow, "If she was doing the kind of work she was doing and photography wasn't enough to keep her alive, what hope did we have?"

== Legacy ==
"[Arbus's] work has had such an influence on other photographers that it is already hard to remember how original it was", wrote the art critic Robert Hughes in a November 1972 issue of Time magazine. She has been called "a seminal figure in modern-day photography and an influence on three generations of photographers" and is widely considered to be among the most influential artists of the last century.

When the film The Shining, directed by Stanley Kubrick, was released to cinemas worldwide in 1980 and became hugely successful, millions of moviegoers experienced Diane Arbus's legacy without realizing it. The movie's recurring characters of identical twin girls who are wearing identical dresses appear on-screen as a result of a suggestion Kubrick received from crew member Leon Vitali. He is described by film historian Nick Chen as "Kubrick's right-hand man from the mid-70s onwards". Chen goes on to reveal, "Not only did Vitali videotape and interview 5,000 kids to find [the right child actor to portray] Jack Nicholson's [character's] son, Danny, he was also responsible for discovering the creepy twin sisters on the final day of auditions. The pair, in fact, weren't twins in Kubrick's script, and it was Vitali who immediately suggested Diane Arbus's infamous photo of identical twin sisters as a point of reference."

Since Arbus died without a will, the responsibility for overseeing her work fell to her daughter, Doon. She forbade examination of Arbus's correspondence and often denied permission for exhibition or reproduction of Arbus's photographs without prior vetting, to the ire of many critics and scholars. The editors of an academic journal published a two-page complaint in 1993 about the estate's control over Arbus's images and its attempt to censor characterizations of subjects and the photographer's motives in articles about Arbus. A 2005 article called the estate's allowing the British press to reproduce only fifteen photographs an attempt to "control criticism and debate". On the other hand, it is common institutional practice in the U.S. to include only a handful of images for media use in an exhibition press kit. The estate was also criticized in 2008 for minimizing Arbus's early commercial work, although those photographs were taken by Allan Arbus and credited to the Diane and Allan Arbus Studio.

In 2011, a review in The Guardian of An Emergency in Slow Motion: The Inner Life of Diane Arbus by William Todd Schultz references "... the famously controlling Arbus estate who, as Schultz put it recently, 'seem to have this idea, which I disagree with, that any attempt to interpret the art diminishes the art.'"

In 1972, Arbus was the first photographer to be included in the Venice Biennale; her photographs were described as "the overwhelming sensation of the American Pavilion" and "an extraordinary achievement".

The Museum of Modern Art held a retrospective curated by John Szarkowski of Arbus's work in late 1972 that subsequently traveled around the United States and Canada through 1975; it was estimated that over seven million people saw the exhibition. A different retrospective curated by Marvin Israel and Doon Arbus traveled around the world between 1973 and 1979.

Doon Arbus and Marvin Israel edited and designed a 1972 book, Diane Arbus: An Aperture Monograph, published by Aperture and accompanying the Museum of Modern Art's exhibition. It contained eighty of Arbus's photographs, as well as texts from classes that she gave in 1971, some of her writings, and interviews,

In 2001–04, Diane Arbus: An Aperture Monograph was selected as one of the most important photobooks in history.

Neil Selkirk, a former student, began printing for the 1972 MOMA retrospective and Aperture Monograph. He remains the only person who is authorized to make posthumous prints of Arbus's work.

A half-hour documentary film about Arbus's life and work known as Masters of Photography: Diane Arbus or Going Where I've Never Been: The Photography of Diane Arbus was produced in 1972 and released on video in 1989. The voiceover was drawn from recordings made of Arbus's photography class by Ikkō Narahara and voiced by Mariclare Costello, who was Arbus's friend and the wife of her ex-husband Allan.

Patricia Bosworth wrote an unauthorized biography of Arbus published in 1984. Bosworth reportedly "received no help from Arbus's daughters, or from their father, or from two of her closest and most prescient friends, Avedon and ... Marvin Israel". The book was also criticized for insufficiently considering Arbus's own words, for speculating about missing information, and for focusing on "sex, depression and famous people", instead of Arbus's art.

In 1986, Arbus was inducted into the International Photography Hall of Fame and Museum.

Between 2003 and 2006, Arbus and her work were the subject of another major traveling exhibition, Diane Arbus Revelations, which was organized by the San Francisco Museum of Modern Art; among the venues was the Metropolitan Museum of Art. Accompanied by a book of the same name, the exhibition included artifacts such as correspondence, books, and cameras as well as 180 photographs by Arbus. By "making substantial public excerpts from Arbus's letters, diaries and notebooks" the exhibition and book "undertook to claim the center-ground on the basic facts relating to the artist's life and death". Because Arbus's estate approved the exhibition and book, the chronology in the book is "effectively the first authorized biography of the photographer".

In 2006, the fictional film Fur: An Imaginary Portrait of Diane Arbus was released, starring Nicole Kidman as Arbus; it used Patricia Bosworth's unauthorized biography Diane Arbus: A Biography as a source of inspiration. Critics generally took issue with the film's "fairytale" portrayal of Arbus.

The Metropolitan Museum of Art purchased twenty of Arbus's photographs (valued at millions of dollars) and received Arbus's archives, which included hundreds of early and unique photographs, and negatives and contact prints of 7,500 rolls of film, as a gift from her estate in 2007.

In 2018, The New York Times published a belated obituary of Arbus as part of the Overlooked history project.

On 11 August 2025, the main belt asteroid 2007 AD_{23} was named 262825 Dianearbus in her honor.

== Critical reception ==
- In a 1967 review of MoMA's New Documents exhibition, which featured the work of Diane Arbus, Lee Friedlander, and Garry Winogrand, Max Kozloff wrote, "What these photographers have in common is a complete loss of faith in the mass media as vehicle, or even market for their work. Newsiness, from the journalistic point of view, and 'stories', from the literary one, in any event, do not interest them .... Arbus' refusal to be compassionate, her revulsion against moral judgment, lends her work an extraordinary ethical conviction."
- Writing for Arts Magazine, Marion Magid stated, "Because of its emphasis on the hidden and the eccentric, this exhibit has, first of all, the perpetual, if criminal, allure of a sideshow. One begins by simply craving to look at the forbidden things one has been told all one's life not to stare at ... One does not look at such subjects with impunity, as anyone knows who has ever stared at the sleeping face of a familiar person, and discovered its strangeness. Once having looked and not looked away, we are implicated. When we have met the gaze of a midget or a female impersonator, a transaction takes place between the photograph and the viewer; in a kind of healing process, we are cured of our criminal urgency by having dared to look. The picture forgives us, as it were, for looking. In the end, the great humanity of Diane Arbus' art is to sanctify that privacy which she seems at first to have violated."
- Robert Hughes in a Time magazine review of the 1972 Diane Arbus retrospective at MoMA wrote, "Arbus did what hardly seemed possible for a still photographer. She altered our experience of the face."
- In his review of the 1972 retrospective, Hilton Kramer stated that Arbus was "one of those figures—as rare in the annals of photography as in the history of any other medium—who suddenly, by a daring leap into a territory formerly regarded as forbidden, altered the terms of the art she practiced ... she completely wins us over, not only to her pictures but to her people, because she has clearly come to feel something like love for them herself. "
- Susan Sontag wrote an essay in 1973 entitled "Freak Show" that was critical of Arbus's work; it was reprinted in her 1977 book On Photography as "America, Seen Through Photographs, Darkly". Among other criticisms, Sontag opposed the lack of beauty in Arbus's work and its failure to make the viewer feel compassionate about Arbus's subjects. Sontag's essay itself has been criticized as "an exercise in aesthetic insensibility" and "exemplary for its shallowness". Sontag has also stated that "the subjects of Arbus's photographs are all members of the same family, inhabitants of a single village. Only, as it happens, the idiot village is America. Instead of showing identity between things which are different (Whitman's democratic vista), everybody is the same." A 2009 article noted that Arbus had photographed Sontag and her son in 1965, causing one to "wonder if Sontag felt this was an unfair portrait". Philip Charrier argues in a 2012 article that despite its narrowness and widely discussed faults, Sontag's critique continues to inform much of the scholarship and criticism of Arbus's oeuvre. The article proposes overcoming this tradition by asking new questions, and by shifting the focus away from matters of biography, ethics, and Arbus's suicide.
- In Susan Sontag's essay "Freak Show", she writes, "The authority of Arbus's photographs comes from the contrast between their lacerating subject matter and their calm, matteroffact attentiveness. This quality of attention—the attention paid by the photographer, the attention paid by the subject to the act of being photographed—creates the moral theater of Arbus's straight on, contemplative portraits. Far from spying on freaks and pariahs, catching them unawares, the photographer has gotten to know them, reassured them—so that they pose for her as calmly and stiffly as any Victorian notable sat for a studio portrait by Nadar or Julia Margaret Cameron. A large part of the mystery of Arbus's photographs lies in what they suggest about how her subjects felt after consenting to be photographed. Do they see themselves, the viewer wonders, like that? Do they know how grotesque they are? It seems as if they don't."
- Judith Goldman in 1974 posited that, "Arbus' camera reflected her own desperateness in the same way that the observer looks at the picture and then back at himself."
- David Pagel's 1992 review of the Untitled series states, "These rarely seen photographs are some of the most hauntingly compassionate images made with a camera .... The range of expressions Arbus has captured is remarkable in its startling shifts from carefree glee to utter trepidation, ecstatic self-abandonment to shy withdrawal, and simple boredom to neighborly love. Perhaps the most intriguing aspect of her photographs is the way they combine sentiments we all share with experiences we can imagine but never know."
- In reviewing Diane Arbus: Untitled for Artforum, Nan Goldin said, "She was able to let things be, as they are, rather than seeking to transform them. The quality that defines her work, and separates it from almost all other photography, is her ability to empathize, on a level far beyond language. Arbus could travel, in the mythic sense. Perhaps out of the desire not to be herself, she tried on the skins of others and took us along for the trip. Arbus was obsessed with people who manifested trauma, maybe because her own crisis was so internalized. She was able to look full in the faces we normally avert our eyes from, and to show beauty there as well as pain. Her work is often difficult but it isn't cruel. She undertook that greatest act of courage—to face the terror of darkness and remain articulate."
- Hilton Als reviewed Untitled in 1995 for The New Yorker, saying, "The extraordinary power of Untitled confirms our earliest impression of Arbus's work; namely, that it is as iconographic as it gets in any medium."
- In her review of the traveling exhibition Diane Arbus Revelations, Francine Prose writes, "Even as we grow more restive with conventional religion, with the intolerance and even brutality it so frequently exacts in trade for meaning and consolation, Arbus's work can seem like the bible of a faith to which one can almost imagine subscribing—the temple of the individual and irreducible human soul, the church of obsessive fascination and compassion for those fellow mortals whom, on the basis of mere surface impressions, we thoughtlessly misidentify as the wretched of the earth."
- Barbara O'Brien in a 2004 review of the exhibition Diane Arbus: Family Albums found her and August Sander's work "filled with life and energy."
- Peter Schjeldahl, in a 2005 review of the exhibition Diane Arbus Revelations for The New Yorker stated, "She turned picture-making inside out. She didn't gaze at her subjects; she induced them to gaze at her. Selected for their powers of strangeness and confidence, they burst through the camera lens with a presence so intense that whatever attitude she or you or anyone might take toward them disintegrates .... You may feel, crazily, that you have never really seen a photograph before. Nor is this impression of novelty evanescent. Over the years, Arbuses that I once found devastating have seemed to wait for me to change just a little, then to devastate me all over again. No other photographer has been more controversial. Her greatness, a fact of experience, remains imperfectly understood."
- Michael Kimmelman wrote in 2005, "If the proper word isn't spirituality then it's grace. Arbus touches her favorite subjects with grace. It's in the spread-arm pose of the sword swallower, in the tattooed human pincushion, like St. Sebastian, and in the virginal waitress at the nudist camp, with her apron and order pad and her nicked shin. And it's famously in the naked couple in the woods, like Adam and Eve after the Fall."
- Ken Johnson, reviewing a show of Arbus's lesser-known works in 2005, wrote, "Arbus's perfectly composed, usually centered images have a way of arousing an almost painfully urgent curiosity. Who is the boy in the suit and tie and fedora who looks up from the magazine in a neighborhood store and fixes us with a gaze of unfathomable seriousness? What is the story with the funny, birdlike lady with the odd, floppy knit hat perched on her head? What is the bulky dark man in the suit and hat saying to the thin, well-dressed older woman with the pinched, masklike face as he jabs the air with a finger while they walk in Central Park? Arbus was a wonderful formalist and just as wonderful a storyteller—the Flannery O'Connor of photography.
- Leo Rubinfien wrote in 2005, "No photographer makes viewers feel more strongly that they are being directly addressed ... When her work is at its most august, Arbus sees through her subject's pretensions, her subject sees that she sees, and an intricate parley occurs around what the subject wants to show and wants to conceal ... She loved conundrum, contradiction, riddle, and this, as much as the pain in her work, puts it near Kafka's and Beckett's ... I doubt anyone in the modern arts, not Kafka, not Beckett, has strung such a long, delicate thread between laughter and tears."
- In Stephanie Zacharek's 2006 review of the movie Fur: An Imaginary Portrait of Diane Arbus, she writes, "When I look at her pictures, I see not a gift for capturing whatever life is there, but a desire to confirm her suspicions about humanity's dullness, stupidity, and ugliness."
- Wayne Koestenbaum asked in 2007 whether Arbus's photographs humiliate the subjects or the viewers. In a 2013 interview for the Los Angeles Review of Books he also said, "She's finding little pockets of jubilation that are framed within each photograph. The obvious meaning of the photograph is abjection, but the obtuse meaning is jubilation, beauty, staunchness, pattern."
- Mark Feeney's 2016 The Boston Globe review of in the beginning at the Met Breuer states, "It's not so much that Arbus changed how we see the world as how we allow ourselves to see it. Underbelly and id are no less part of society for being less visible. Outcasts and outsiders become their own norm – and with Arbus as ambassador, ours, too. She witnesses without ever judging."
- In a 2018 review for The New York Times on Diane Arbus's Untitled series, Arthur Lubow writes, "The 'Untitled' photographs evoke paintings by Ensor, Bruegel and especially the covens and rituals conjured up by Goya ... In the almost half century that has elapsed since Arbus made the 'Untitled' pictures, photographers have increasingly adopted a practice of constructing the scenes they shoot and altering the pictures with digital technology in an effort to bring to light the visions in their heads. The 'Untitled' series, one of the towering achievements of American art, reminds us that nothing can surpass the strange beauty of reality if a photographer knows where to look. And how to look."
- Adam Lehrer wrote, in his Forbes review of Untitled, Arbus calls attention to vibrant expressions of joy while never letting us forget life's eternal anguish. Some critics have suggested that Arbus sees herself in her subjects. But perhaps that's only partially true. It's probably a more factual assertion to claim that Arbus sees all of us in her subjects ... Arbus's only delusion was believing, or hoping, that others would share her peculiar fixations. But to say that her work is merely about human imperfection is both accurate and laughably dismissive. Arbus surely was focused on human imperfection, but within imperfection, she found unvarnished, perfect humanity. And humanity, to Arbus, was beautiful."

Some of Arbus's subjects and their relatives have commented on their experience being photographed by Diane Arbus:

- The father of the twins pictured in "Identical Twins, Roselle, N.J. 1967" said, "We thought it was the worst likeness of the twins we'd ever seen. I mean it resembles them, but we've always been baffled that she made them look ghostly. None of the other pictures we have of them looks anything like this."
- Writer Germaine Greer, who was the subject of an Arbus photograph in 1971, criticized it as an "undeniably bad picture" and Arbus's work in general as unoriginal and focusing on "mere human imperfection and self-delusion."
- Norman Mailer said, in 1971, "Giving a camera to Diane Arbus is like putting a live grenade in the hands of a child." Mailer was reportedly displeased with the well-known "spread-legged" New York Times Book Review photo. Arbus photographed him in 1963.
- Colin Wood, the subject of Child With a Toy Grenade in Central Park, said, "She saw in me the frustration, the anger at my surroundings, the kid wanting to explode but can't because he's constrained by his background."

== Publications ==
- Diane Arbus: An Aperture Monograph. Edited by Doon Arbus and Marvin Israel. Accompanied an exhibition at Museum of Modern Art, New York.
  - New York: Aperture, 1972. ISBN 9780912334400.
  - New York: Aperture, 1997. ISBN 9780893816940.
  - Fortieth-anniversary edition. New York: Aperture, 2011. ISBN 978-1-59711-174-4 (hardback); ISBN 978-1-59711-175-1 (paperback).
- Diane Arbus: Magazine Work. Edited by Doon Arbus and Marvin Israel. With texts by Diane Arbus and an essay by Thomas W. Southall.
  - New York: Aperture, 1984. ISBN 978-0-89381-233-1.
  - London: Bloomsbury, 1992. ISBN 9780893812331.
- Untitled. Edited by Doon Arbus and Yolanda Cuomo.
  - New York: Aperture, 1995. ISBN 978-0-89381-623-0.
  - New York: Aperture, 2011. ISBN 978-1-59711-190-4.
- Diane Arbus: Revelations. New York: Random House, 2003. ISBN 9780375506208. Includes essays by Sandra S. Phillips ("The question of belief") and Neil Selkirk ("In the darkroom"); a chronology by Elisabeth Sussman and Doon Arbus including text by Diane Arbus; afterword by Doon Arbus; and biographies of fifty five of Arbus's friends and colleagues by Jeff L. Rosenheim. Accompanied an exhibition that premièred at San Francisco Museum of Modern Art.
- Diane Arbus: A Chronology, 1923–1971. New York: Aperture, 2011. ISBN 978-1-59711-179-9. By Elisabeth Sussman and Doon Arbus. Contains the chronology and biographies from Diane Arbus: Revelations.
- Silent Dialogues: Diane Arbus & Howard Nemerov. San Francisco: Fraenkel Gallery, 2015. ISBN 978-1881337416. By Alexander Nemerov.
- diane arbus: in the beginning. New York: Metropolitan Museum of Art, 2016. ISBN 978-1588395955. By Jeff L. Rosenheim. Accompanied an exhibition that premiered at The Metropolitan Museum of Art.
- Diane Arbus: A box of ten photographs. New York: Aperture, 2018. ISBN 978-1597114394. By John P. Jacob. Accompanied an exhibition that premiered at the Smithsonian American Art Museum.
- Diane Arbus Revelations. New York: Aperture, 2022. ISBN 9781597115384.

== Notable photographs ==
Child with Toy Hand Grenade in Central Park, N.Y.C. 1962 (1962)

Identical Twins, Roselle, New Jersey, 1967

Eddie Carmel, Jewish Giant, taken at Home with His Parents in the Bronx, New York, 1970

Arbus's most well-known photographs include:

- Child with Toy Hand Grenade in Central Park, N.Y.C. 1962 – Colin Wood, with the left strap of his jumper awkwardly hanging off his shoulder, tensely holds his long, thin arms by his side. Clenching a toy grenade in his right hand and holding his left hand in a claw-like gesture, his facial expression is one of consternation. The contact sheet demonstrates that Arbus made an editorial choice in selecting which image to print. A print of this photograph was sold in 2015 at auction for $785,000, an auction record for Arbus.
- Teenage Couple on Hudson Street, N.Y.C., 1963 – Wearing long coats and "worldlywise expressions", two adolescents appear older than their ages.
- Triplets in Their Bedroom, N.J. 1963 – Three girls sit at the head of a bed.
- A Young Brooklyn Family Going for a Sunday Outing, N.Y.C. 1966 – Richard and Marylin Dauria, who lived in the Bronx. Marylin holds their baby daughter, and Richard holds the hand of their young son, who is intellectually disabled.
- A Young Man in Curlers at Home on West 20th Street, N.Y.C. 1966 – A close-up shows the man's pock-marked face with plucked eyebrows, and his hand with long fingernails holds a cigarette. Early reactions to the photograph were strong; for example, someone spat on it in 1967 at the Museum of Modern Art. A print was sold for $198,400 at a 2004 auction.
- Boy With a Straw Hat Waiting to March in a Pro-War Parade, N.Y.C. 1967 – With an American flag at his side, he wears a bow tie, a pin in the shape of a bow tie with an American flag motif, and two round button badges: "Bomb Hanoi" and "God Bless America / Support Our Boys in Viet Nam". The image may cause the viewer to feel both different from the boy and sympathetic toward him. An art consulting firm purchased a print for $245,000 at a 2016 auction.
- Identical Twins, Roselle, N.J. 1967 – Young twin sisters Cathleen and Colleen Wade stand side by side in dark dresses. The uniformity of their clothing and haircut characterize them as being twins while the facial expressions strongly accentuate their individuality. This photograph is echoed in Stanley Kubrick's film The Shining, which features twins in an identical pose as ghosts. A print was sold at auction for $732,500 in 2018.
- A Family on Their Lawn One Sunday in Westchester, N.Y. 1968 – A woman and a man sunbathe while a boy bends over a small plastic wading pool behind them. In 1972, Neil Selkirk was put in charge of producing an exhibition print of this image when Marvin Israel advised him to make the background trees appear "like a theatrical backdrop that might at any moment roll forward across the lawn.". This anecdote illustrates vividly just how fundamental dialectics between appearance and substance are for the understanding of Arbus's art. A print was sold at auction in 2008 for $553,000.
- A Naked Man Being a Woman, N.Y.C. 1968 – The subject has been described as in a "Venus-on-the-half-shell pose" (referring to The Birth of Venus by Sandro Botticelli) or as "a Madonna turned in contrapposto ... with his penis hidden between his legs" (referring to a Madonna in contrapposto). The parted curtain behind the man adds to the theatrical quality of the photograph.
- A Very Young Baby, N.Y.C. 1968 – A photograph for Harper's Bazaar depicts Gloria Vanderbilt's then-infant son, the future CNN anchorman Anderson Cooper.
- A Jewish Giant at Home with His Parents in The Bronx, N.Y. 1970 – Eddie Carmel, the "Jewish Giant", stands in his family's apartment with his much shorter mother and father. Arbus reportedly said to a friend about this picture: "You know how every mother has nightmares when she's pregnant that her baby will be born a monster? ... I think I got that in the mother's face ...". The photograph motivated Carmel's cousin to narrate a 1999 audio documentary about him. A print was sold at auction for $583,500 in 2017.

In addition, Arbus's A box of ten photographs was a portfolio of selected 1963–1970 photographs in a clear Plexiglas box/frame that was designed by Marvin Israel and was to have been issued in a limited edition of 50. However, Arbus completed only eight boxes and sold only four (two to Richard Avedon, one to Jasper Johns, and one to Bea Feitler). After Arbus's death, under the auspices of the Estate of Diane Arbus, Neil Selkirk began printing to complete Arbus's intended edition of 50. In 2017, one of these posthumous editions sold for $792,500.

== Solo exhibitions ==
- 1967: New Documents. Museum of Modern Art, New York.
- 1972: Diane Arbus Portfolio: 10 Photos. Venice Biennale.
- 1972–1975: Diane Arbus (125 photographs, curated by John Szarkowski). Museum of Modern Art, New York; Baltimore; Worcester Art Museum, Massachusetts; Museum of Contemporary Art, Chicago; Walker Art Center, Minneapolis; National Gallery of Canada, Ottawa; Detroit Institute of Arts; Witte Memorial Museum, San Antonio, Texas; New Orleans Museum of Art; Berkeley Art Museum and Pacific Film Archive, California; Museum of Fine Arts, Houston; Florida Center for the Arts, University of South Florida, Tampa; and Krannert Art Museum, University of Illinois, Champaign.
- 1973–79: Diane Arbus: Retrospective (118 photographs, curated by Doon Arbus and Marvin Israel). Seibu Museum, Tokyo; Hayward Gallery, London; Ikon Gallery, Birmingham, England; Scottish Arts Council, Edinburgh, Scotland; Van Abbe Museum, Eindhoven, The Netherlands; Van Gogh Museum, Amsterdam; Lenbachhaus Städtische Galerie, Munich, Germany; Von der Heydt Museum, Wuppertal, Germany; Frankfurter Kunstverein; 14 galleries and museums in Australia; and 7 galleries and museums in New Zealand.
- 1980: Diane Arbus: Vintage Unpublished Photographs. Robert Miller Gallery, New York; Fraenkel Gallery, New York.
- 1983: Diane Arbus: Photographs. Palazzo della Cento Finestre, Florence; Palazzo Fortuny, Venice; Palazzo delle Esposizioni, Milan.
- 1984–1987: Diane Arbus: Magazine Work 1960–1971. Spencer Museum of Art, Lawrence, Kansas; Minneapolis Institute of Art, Minneapolis; University of Kentucky Art Museum, Lexington; University Art Museum, California State University, Long Beach; Neuberger Museum, State University of New York at Purchase; Wellesley College Museum, Massachusetts; and Philadelphia Museum of Art.
- 1986: Diane Arbus. American Center, Paris; La Fundacion "la Caixa", Barcelona, Spain; La Fundacion "la Caixa", Madrid; Robert Klein Gallery, Boston, MA; Light Factory, Charlotte, NC.
- 1991: Diane Arbus. Ydessa Hendeles Art Foundation, Toronto.
- 1992: Diane Arbus: The Untitled Series, 1970–1971. Jan Kesner Gallery, Los Angeles.
- 1995: The Movies: Photographs from 1956 to 1958. Robert Miller Gallery, New York.
- 1997: Diane Arbus: Women. Galleria Photology, London.
- 2003–2006: Diane Arbus: Revelations. San Francisco Museum of Modern Art; Los Angeles County Museum of Art; Museum of Fine Arts, Houston; Metropolitan Museum of Art, New York; Museum Folkwang, Essen, Germany; Victoria and Albert Museum, London; CaixaForum, Barcelona; and Walker Art Center, Minneapolis.
- 2004–2005: Diane Arbus: Family Albums. Mount Holyoke College Art Museum, South Hadley, Massachusetts; Grey Art Gallery, New York; Portland Museum of Art, Maine; Spencer Museum of Art, Lawrence, Kansas; and Portland Art Museum, Oregon.
- 2005: Diane Arbus: Other Faces Other Rooms. Robert Miller Gallery, New York.
- 2007: Something Was There: Early Work by Diane Arbus. Fraenkel Gallery, San Francisco.
- 2008–2009: Diane Arbus, a Printed Retrospective, 1960–1971. Kadist Art Foundation, Paris; and Centre Régional de la Photographie Nord Pas-de-Calais, Douchy-les-Mines, France.
- 2009: Diane Arbus. Timothy Taylor Gallery, London.
- 2009–2018: Artist Rooms: Diane Arbus. National Museum Cardiff, Wales; and Dean Gallery, Edinburgh, Scotland; Scottish National Gallery of Modern Art, Edinburgh; Nottingham Contemporary; Aberdeen Art Gallery; Tate Modern, London; Kirkcaldy Galleries; The Burton at Bideford.
- 2010: Diane Arbus: Christ in a Lobby and Other Unknown or Almost Known Works. Fraenkel Gallery, San Francisco; Martin-Gropius-Bau, Berlin; FOAM, Amsterdam.
- 2011: Diane Arbus: People and Other Singularities. Gagosian Gallery, Beverly Hills, California.
- 2011–2013: Diane Arbus. Galerie nationale du Jeu de Paume, Paris; Fotomuseum, Winterthur; Martin-Gropius-Bau, Berlin; and Foam Fotografiemuseum Amsterdam.
- 2016–2017: diane arbus: in the beginning. Metropolitan Museum of Art, New York; San Francisco Museum of Modern Art, San Francisco; Malba, Buenos Aires, Argentina.

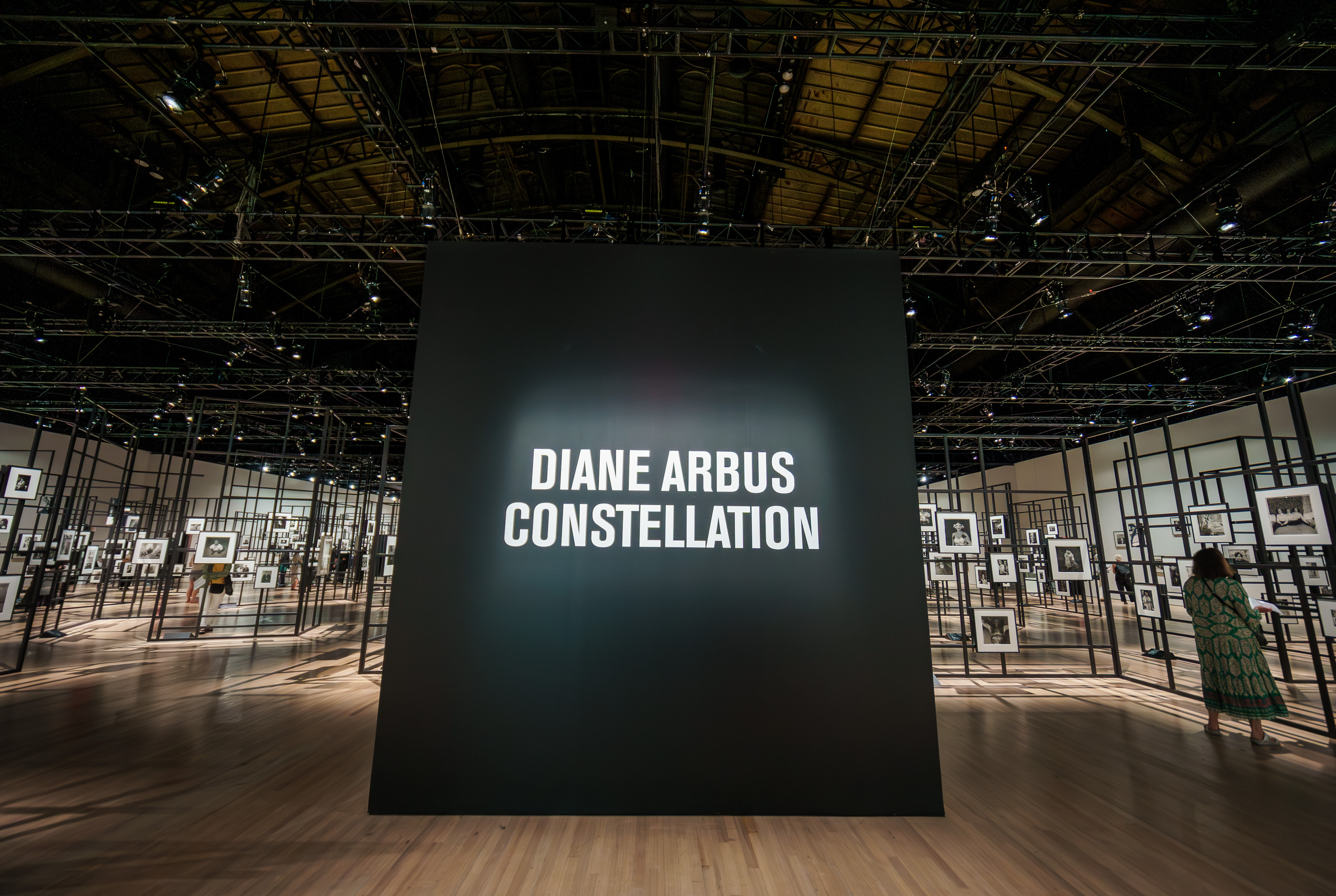
Diane Arbus Constellation, Park Avenue Armory, 2025

- 2013: Diane Arbus: 1971 – 1956. Fraenkel Gallery, San Francisco.
- 2017: Diane Arbus: In the Park, Lévy Gorvy, New York.
- 2018: Diane Arbus: A Box of ten photographs, Smithsonian American Art Museum, Washington, D.C.
- 2018: Diane Arbus Untitled, David Zwirner Gallery, New York.
- 2019: Diane Arbus: In the Beginning, Hayward Gallery, London.
- 2020: Diane Arbus: Photographs, 1956–1971, Art Gallery of Ontario, Toronto.
- 2025: Diane Arbus Constellation at New York's Park Avenue Armory, promoted as the artist's "largest ever" retrospective, featuring 454 Arbus prints by Neil Selkirk. Selkirk is the only person authorized to make prints from her negatives.

== Collections ==
Arbus's work is held in the following permanent collections:

- Akron Art Museum
- Art Gallery of Ontario, Canada
- Art Institute of Chicago, IL
- BA-CA Kunstforum, Bank Austria Art Collection, Wien
- Bibliothèque nationale de France, Paris
- Birmingham Museum of Art, Birmingham, Alabama
- Center for Creative Photography, Tucson
- Cincinnati Art Museum
- Cleveland Museum of Art
- Davison Art Center, Wesleyan University, Middletown, Connecticut
- Fotomuseum Winterthur, Switzerland
- Frances Lehman Loeb Art Center, Poughkeepsie
- George Eastman House, Rochester, New York
- Goetz Collection, Munich
- Harvard Art Museums/Fogg Museum, Cambridge, MA
- International Center of Photography, New York City
- Institut Valencià d'Art Modern, Valencia, Spain
- J. Paul Getty Museum, Los Angeles, California
- John and Mable Ringling Museum of Art, Sarasota
- Kalamazoo Institute of Arts, Kalamazoo, MI
- KMS Fine Art Group, Baar, Switzerland
- Los Angeles County Museum of Art
- Maison Europeene de la Photographie, Paris
- Metropolitan Museum of Art, New York
- Milwaukee Art Museum
- Minneapolis Institute of Art
- Moderna Museet Malmö
- Moderna Museet, Stockholm
- Morgan Library & Museum, New York
- Museum of Contemporary Art, Los Angeles, California
- Museum of Contemporary Photography, Chicago, IL
- Museum of Fine Arts, Boston, Massachuesetts
- Museum of Fine Arts, Houston, Texas
- Museum of Fine Arts (St. Petersburg, Florida)
- Museum Folkwang, Essen, Germany
- Museum of Modern Art, New York
- Musée National d'Art Moderne, Centre Pompidou, Paris
- Museo Nacional Centro de Arte Reina Sofía, Madrid
- National Gallery of Art, Washington, D.C.
- National Gallery of Australia, Canberra, Australia
- National Gallery of Canada, Ottawa
- National Museum of Modern Art, Tokyo
- New Orleans Museum of Art
- New York Public Library Main Branch, New York
- Pier 24 Photography, San Francisco, California
- The Progressive Art Collection, Mayfield Village
- Rijksmuseum, Amsterdam, the Netherlands
- San Francisco Museum of Modern Art, California
- Smithsonian American Art Museum, Washington, D.C.
- Spencer Museum of Art, Lawrence
- Stedelijk Museum Amsterdam, The Netherlands
- Sweet Briar College Art Gallery, Sweet Briar, Virginia
- Tate and National Galleries of Scotland, UK (jointly held)
- Tokyo Metropolitan Art Museum, Japan
- Vancouver Art Gallery, Vancouver
- Victoria and Albert Museum, London
- Whitney Museum, New York
- Williams College Museum of Art, Williamstown, Massachusetts
- Ydessa Hendeles Art Foundation, Toronto
- Yokohama Museum of Art, Yokohama, Japan
