= 390 Fifth Avenue =

Historic building in Manhattan, New York

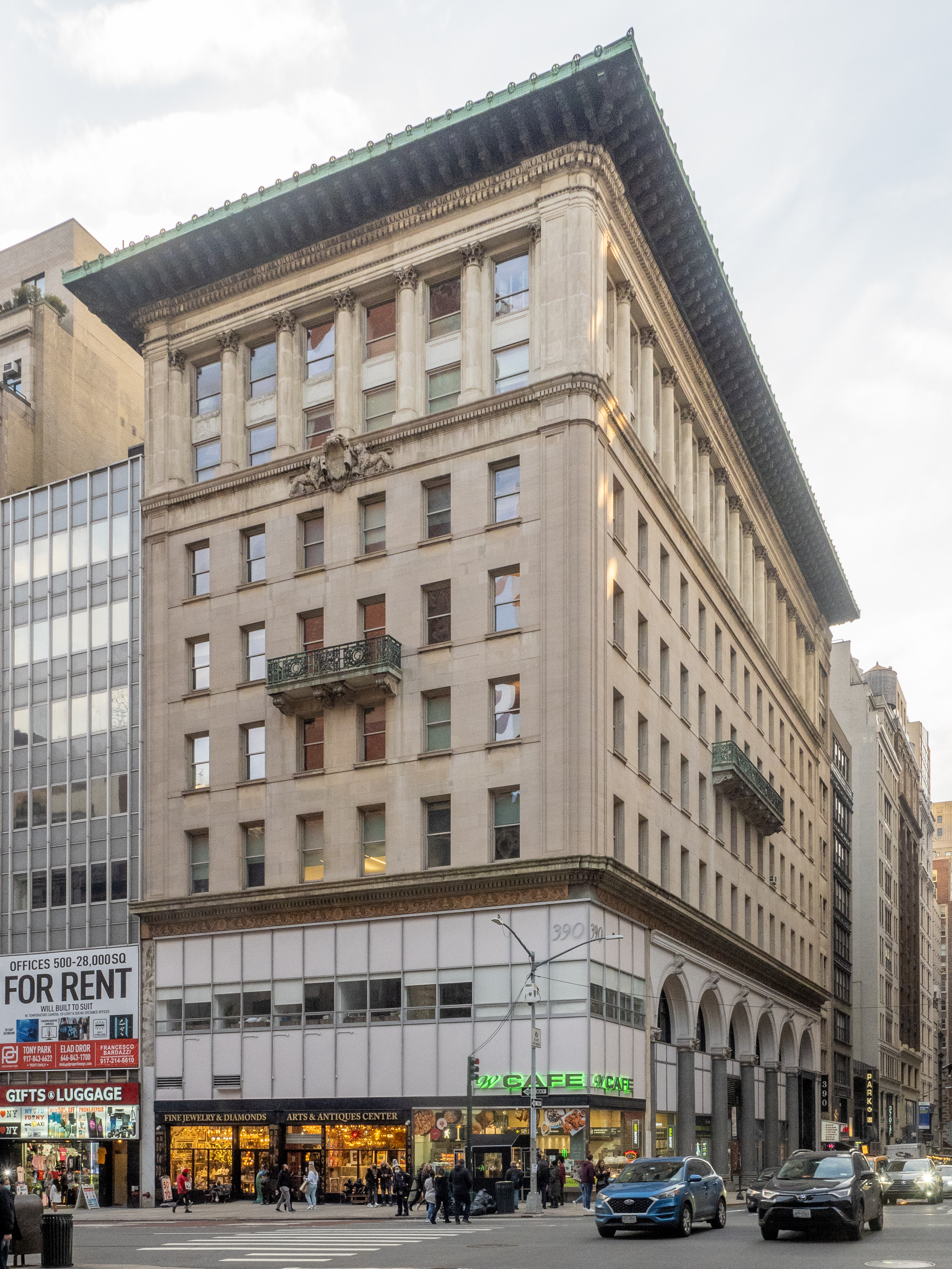
- Seen from Fifth Avenue (2021)
- Alternative names: Gorham Building

General information
- Architectural style: Italian Renaissance Revival
- Location: Midtown Manhattan, New York City, United States
- Coordinates: 40°44′59″N 73°59′03″W
- Named for: Gorham Manufacturing Company
- Groundbreaking: 1904
- Opened: September 5, 1905

Technical details
- Floor count: 8

Design and construction
- Architect: Stanford White
- Architecture firm: McKim, Mead & White

New York City Landmark
- Designated: December 15, 1998
- Reference no.: 2027

390 Fifth Avenue, also known as the Gorham Building, is an Italian Renaissance Revival palazzo-style building at Fifth Avenue and West 36th Street in the Midtown Manhattan neighborhood of New York City, New York, United States. It was designed by McKim, Mead & White, with Stanford White as the partner in charge, and built in 1904–1906. The building was named for the Gorham Manufacturing Company, a major manufacturer of sterling and silverplate, and was a successor to the former Gorham Manufacturing Company Building at 889 Broadway. The building features bronze ornamentation and a copper cornice.

390 Fifth Avenue was occupied by the Gorham Manufacturing Company between 1905 and 1923. It was then home to Russeks department store from 1924 to 1959, and then Spear Securities from 1960, who changed the street level facade. It was designated a New York City landmark in 1998, after the lower floors were significantly altered from their original design.

== Site ==
390 Fifth Avenue, also known as the Gorham Building, is in the South Midtown neighborhood of Manhattan in New York City, New York, United States, on the southwestern corner of Fifth Avenue and 36th Street. The land lot is slightly L-shaped and covers 12,575 square feet (1,168.3 m^{2}). The main building measures 67 feet (20 m) on Fifth Avenue and 167 feet (51 m) along 36th Street. An annex, about 12 feet (3.7 m) wide with a similar facade to the original construction, is west of the main building. Nearby buildings include The Langham, New York hotel and 404 Fifth Avenue one block north; 200 Madison Avenue to the east; the B. Altman and Company Building to the southeast; and the Tiffany & Company Building to the northeast.

Before the Gorham Building was completed, the site had been occupied by the Hotel Shelburn, which by 1902 was called the Hotel Lenox. William Waldorf Astor had acquired the site in 1890. The residential core of Manhattan relocated north from lower Manhattan during the late 19th century. At the beginning of the 20th century, development was centered on Fifth Avenue north of 34th Street, where new department store buildings were quickly replacing the street's brownstones. One of the first new store buildings in the area was the B. Altman and Company Building, which opened in 1906. Other department stores such as Lord & Taylor, as well as specialty stores such as Tiffany & Co. and the Gorham Manufacturing Company, relocated during the 1900s and 1910s. The Gorham, Tiffany, Charles Scribner's Sons, Coty, and Demarest buildings are among the few surviving stores that were erected for smaller retailers on Fifth Avenue during the early 20th century.

== Architecture ==
390 Fifth Avenue is an eight-story building designed by McKim, Mead & White in an early Italian Renaissance Revival style. In his notes, Stanford White of McKim, Mead & White said he wanted both the facade and the store's interior to exhibit "a feeling of elegance and simplicity". A variety of Renaissance inspirations were used in the design. The bronze ornamentation for the facade and interior was designed by White and manufactured by Gorham.

=== Facade ===
Along the eastern elevation on Fifth Avenue and the northern elevation on 36th Street, the facade is clad with yellowish-white Bedford limestone. These elevations are divided into three tiers, which are separated by horizontal string courses. The base comprises the first and second stories; the midsection comprises the third through sixth stories; and the loggia-like attic section comprises the seventh and eighth stories. The northeast corner is slightly rounded, similar to that of the Judge Building. The elevations to the south and west, which face other buildings, are made of brick. As built, the Gorham Building was much taller than surrounding structures.

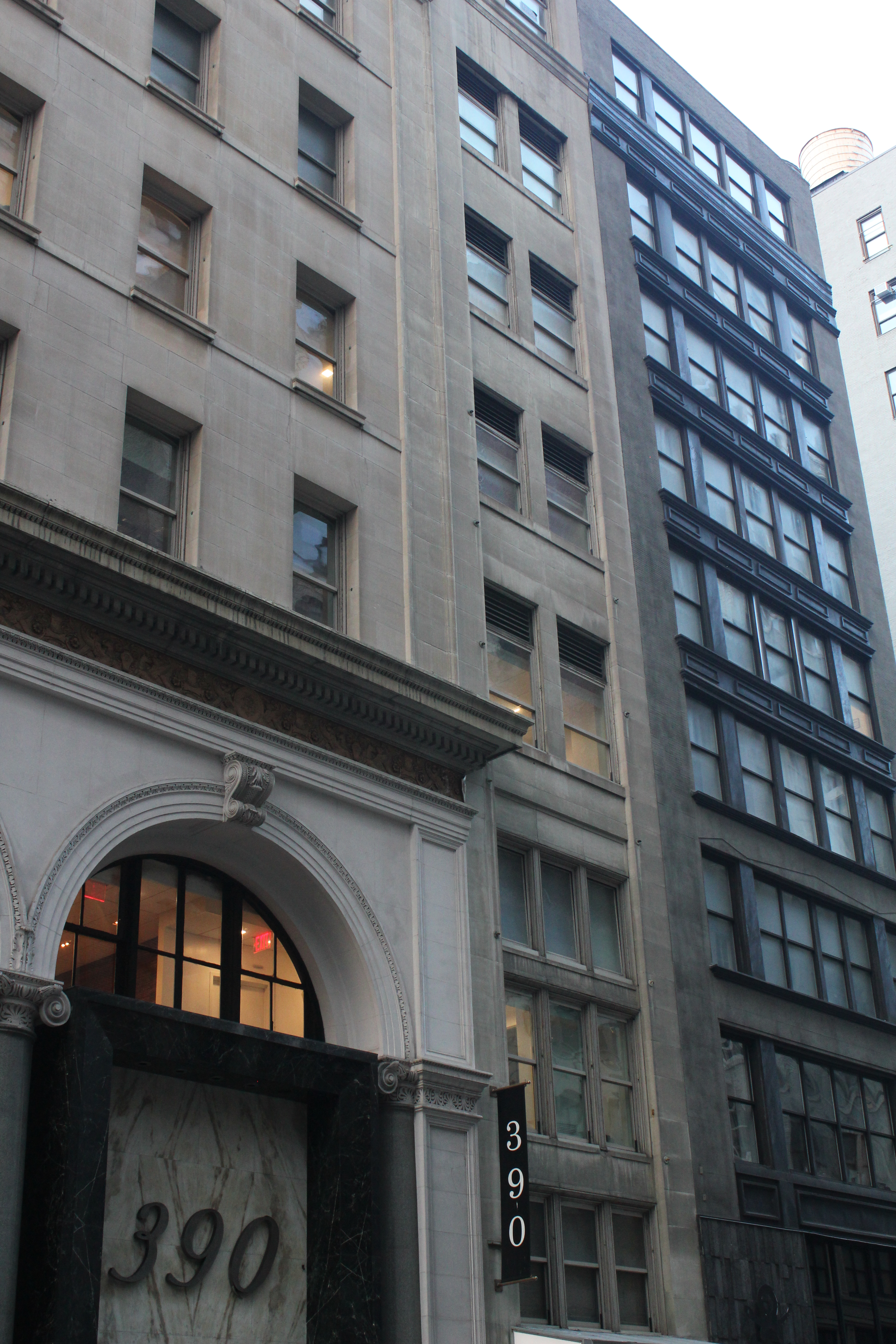
36th Street annex

There is an annex on 36th Street, which is the same height as the original building. The base is composed of a storefront, topped by three sets of sash windows, corresponding to the height of the base in the original building. The remaining stories are composed of six pairs of windows, one on each level. The ground-level arcade and attic loggia do not stretch around to the annex. The top of the facade contains a parapet below the original cornice.

==== Base ====
The entirety of the base originally had a double-height arcade running along it. The arches were supported at ground level by Ionic columns, which are made of gold-flaked Massachusetts granite. Bas-reliefs, removed by 1936, were placed in the spandrels at the top of the arcade. Andrew O'Connor sculpted the reliefs, which were made of bronze and depicted art and industry. There were three arches on the Fifth Avenue side and seven arches on the 36th Street side. There was a bronze frieze above the first floor.

Most of the easternmost arch on 36th Street, and all of the arches on Fifth Avenue, were replaced in 1960 with a storefront composed of an aluminum and glass grid. The remaining arches on 36th Street were preserved, with the main entrance to the building being located within the westernmost arch. Each of the arches at the base corresponded to two vertical window bays on the upper floors. There are six bays on the upper floors on the Fifth Avenue facade and 14 such bays on the 36th Street facade.

==== Upper stories ====
The middle four stories are plainer in design compared to the base. A cartouche with lions was installed above the windows on the fourth floor. On the Fifth Avenue side, there is a balcony spanning the two middle bays on the fifth floor, and on the 36th Street facade, another balcony spans the four center bays on the fifth floor. On the cornice above the sixth floor of the Fifth Avenue facade, there is a frieze, with a cartouche in the center flanked by a pair of lions. The cartouche on Fifth Avenue contains the inscription "ANNO D. MCMIIII", representing 1904, the year the building started construction. A simple frieze runs above the sixth floor of the 36th Street facade.

On the loggia-style facade of the upper two floors, each bay is separated by a Corinthian column. An entablature runs atop the loggia, wrapping along both sides. There was a 8-foot-deep (2.4 m) cornice above the eighth floor. The copper cornice was once polychrome and gilded. Over the years, the cornice has corroded to a green color.

=== Interior ===
The interior was supported by Guastavino tile arches and contained a superstructure of steel beams. The fireproofing consisted of fire clay, masonry, and Portland cement. At the time of the building's construction, it was one of the first in New York City to be constructed of Guastavino arches. On the first floor, eight columns supported the Guastavino-tiled ceiling. The second story had higher ceilings than the other floors, as the space measured 15 feet (4.6 m) high. Architects' and Builders' Magazine described the building a having a steel frame "combined with ribs and domes [that were] self-supported and self-decorating". The stairways and elevators were also clad with bronze. Each story spanned 125,000 square feet (11,600 m^{2}).

When the building was used as a Gorham store, each floor had a different function. Most of the basement was used by the Storage Department and housed customers' silverware, which could be kept on-site indefinitely. The first floor, used as a gold and silverware showroom, had wide and shallow arches containing ornamental reliefs. Custom designs were shown on the second floor, while bronze objects and ecclesiastical and hotel merchandise were on the third floor. Wholesale merchandise was sold on the fourth floor. The fifth story was used for administrative functions, while the top three stories contained the polishing, stationery, and engraving departments.

When women's department store Russeks moved into the building in 1924, the floors were redecorated slightly to give the appearance of individual shops. The first story sold accessories such as undergarments, perfume, and toiletries; it contained marble floors and walnut fixtures. The second story, used for selling furs, was covered in Caen stone and light-stained oak. The third story sold dresses and had stone decorations, a tan carpet, and display niches at each corner. That story also contained three Louis XVI style lounges, as well as women's dressing rooms decorated in enamel. The fourth story sold suits and cloaks and was decorated in walnut; there was a Louis XVI style room on that floor as well. The fifth story, which sold millinery and shoes, also had walnut decorations, and the floor had a blue carpet. On all five stories, there were stockrooms behind the partitions. Between 1959 and 1960, part of the ground story was converted into a lobby that was decorated in marble, bronze, and stainless steel. The upper stories became offices.

== History ==
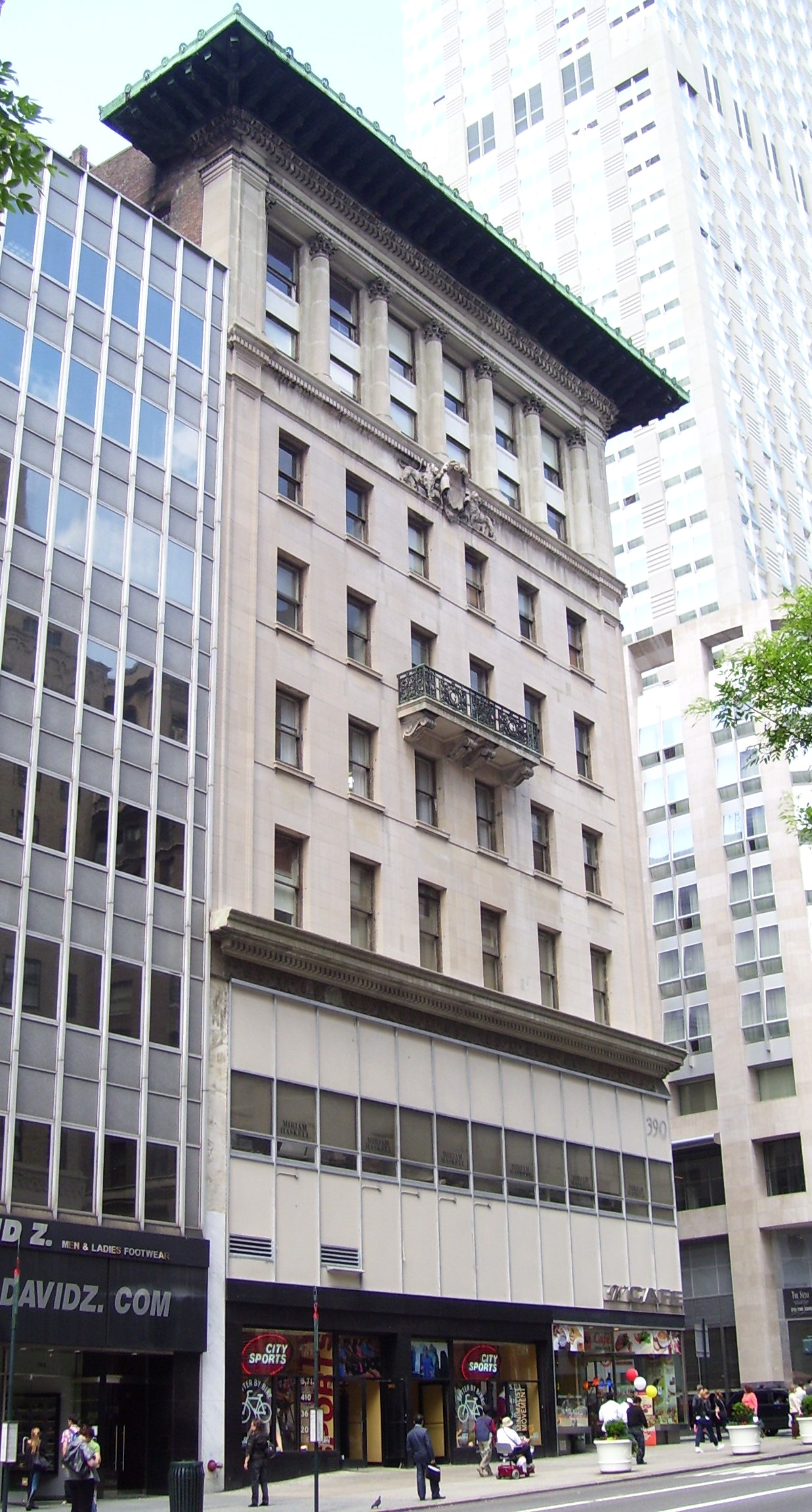
Eastern elevation, seen from the south

In 1884, the Gorham Manufacturing Company opened its New York City showroom on 889 Broadway, at 19th Street in the Ladies' Mile Historic District. By the first decade of the 20th century, factories and lofts were opening in the area around 889 Broadway. Furthermore, stores on Ladies' Mile began to move further north into larger space. The Gorham Manufacturing Company was one of the earliest companies to consider moving uptown. As late as May 1902, Gorham denied rumors that it was planning to develop a new store near the intersection of Fifth Avenue and 33rd Street. Later that year, Gorham leased the Hotel Cambridge at that intersection with plans to build a store at the site.

=== Gorham use ===
In December 1902, after acquiring the 33rd Street plot, Gorham president Edward Holbrook leased the southwest corner of Fifth Avenue and 36th Street. At the time, John Jacob Astor IV owned much of the site that Holbrook had leased. Holbrook hired McKim, Mead & White for the building's design, with Stanford White as the architect in charge. Holbrook requested that the Fifth Avenue building be fireproof and that its layout be able to accommodate the "needs of a great commercial enterprise". The building was designed entirely to the specifications of Gorham, its sole tenant. Fireproofing was considered especially important due to the value of Gorham's merchandise. When the store opened, one journal estimated that, while the building was worth $1.25 million (equal to about $45 million in 2025), its merchandise was worth twice as much.

McKim, Mead & White filed plans in July 1903 with the New York City Department of Buildings for an eight-story building at Fifth Avenue and 36th Street. The building was planned to cost $400,000 and would operate as a store for the Gorham Company. M. & L. Hess leased the building on the southernmost portion of the site (at 384 Fifth Avenue) from Gorham in 1904, and Gorham ultimately sold that building in 1920. Because Gorham was developing its store on 36th Street, it leased the 33rd Street site to other merchants, including jewelry store Shreve & Co.

390 Fifth Avenue opened on September 5, 1905, the same day as the nearby Tiffany and Company Building. The building ultimately cost $1.25 million, of which bronze ornamentation accounted for ten percent. Gorham closed its Broadway store in 1906. In the 1910s, the Gorham Art Galleries operated in the Gorham Building. Among the gallery's exhibitions were works from the American League of Young Sculptors; a spring collection of American sculpture; a set of animal sculptures; and a stained-glass window that Gorham made for a church in Baltimore.

=== Russeks use ===
In early October 1923, Gorham announced it would move uptown and sell both the building and its land lease. Three weeks later, the Martiz Realty Company bought the building on behalf of women's department store Russeks. The lease was finalized the next month, when Russeks also leased the adjacent 384 Fifth Avenue. Prior to moving into the property, Russeks added reinforced concrete floors and a new shop window. In addition, a four-story section of the building on 36th Street was enlarged to eight stories. Russeks moved into 390 Fifth Avenue in September 1924 and expanded into 384 Fifth Avenue in January 1926. Meanwhile, department store Stewart & Co. (which already had a store at 404 Fifth Avenue) filed a lawsuit against Russeks and a bank involved in the transaction, claiming that the lease had violated Stewart & Co.'s rights to the site. A judge upheld Russeks's lease in December 1924, and the state's highest court, the New York Court of Appeals, dismissed the suit in 1927.

P. W. Chapman & Co. placed a $1.5 million first mortgage loan on the building in January 1928. George H. Burr & Co. then distributed about 50,000 shares of common stock in Russeks Fifth Avenue, a subsidiary of Russeks that owned the building. Structural engineer David M. Oltarsh added a five-story annex to a two-story section of the Russeks building. The additional floors were suspended from the building's roof because it would have been prohibitively expensive to rebuild the foundation to support the extra weight. Russeks opened its Southern Resort Shops division within the third floor in 1930. Russeks announced in 1936 that 384 Fifth Avenue would be remodeled to complement the design of 390 Fifth Avenue, giving the store a frontage of 96 or 97 feet (29 or 30 m) on Fifth Avenue. The buildings were linked internally and the facade of number 384 was rebuilt with a limestone base and ground-floor display windows. At this time, the store was expanded at its southwestern corner, within the interior of the block. The next year, the Empire Trust Company acquired 390 and 384 Fifth Avenue at a foreclosure auction.

The City Bank-Farmers Trust Company, acting as trustee for the Astor family, sold the site of 390 Fifth Avenue (but not that of 384 Fifth Avenue) in July 1949 to a syndicate represented by Frederick Fox & Co. The two lots at 384 and 390 Fifth Avenue were worth a combined $2.1 million, while the building was worth $750,000. The syndicate was identified as Spear Securities. The syndicate finalized its acquisition that August, and the Prudential Life Insurance Company placed a $1.2 million mortgage on the site. By the late 1950s, Russeks was reporting year-over-year losses. James Kassner took over the store around 1957 and remodeled it twice, but the small selling floors remained unprofitable and the high ceilings increased the cost of air conditioning and heating. In February 1959, after five years of losses, the company announced the closure of its Fifth Avenue store. A writer for Women's Wear Daily attributed the decline of the Russeks store to its heavy focus on luxury fashion, even though most such stores had long since moved further up Fifth Avenue. The store closed on May 2, 1959.

=== Office use ===
==== Renovation and initial tenants ====
After the Russeks store closed, the building was sold to Spear Securities. Robert H. Arrow, who represented the owners, first attempted to find another discount store that was willing to occupy the Gorham Building. Spear announced plans in October 1959 to renovate the building, hiring Herbert Tannenbaum as the architect in charge and the MacArthur Construction Corp. as the general contractor. The renovation was completed the next year at a cost of $1 million. The building's colonnade and carved-marble sheets were removed as part of the renovation, and a glass facade was installed along the lower stories. Tannenbaum later said he had wanted to save the carved marble and the colonnade. He tried to convince the owner to keep the original design, but said, "They told me, 'Do it or we'll get someone else.'" He therefore created a crisp modern grid of glass and metal, but felt terrible, and hated to see the original details stripped off, and sadly recalled: "Those arches were lovely.

The contractors built a new marble lobby, replaced three elevators, and added a freight entrance with its own elevator. 384 Fifth Avenue again became its own building and was leased by the Tandy Corporation. The Gorham Building was one of more than 25 buildings on Fifth Avenue between 34th and 50th Street that had been significantly altered since World War II, even as only eight new buildings had been erected in that area during the same time.

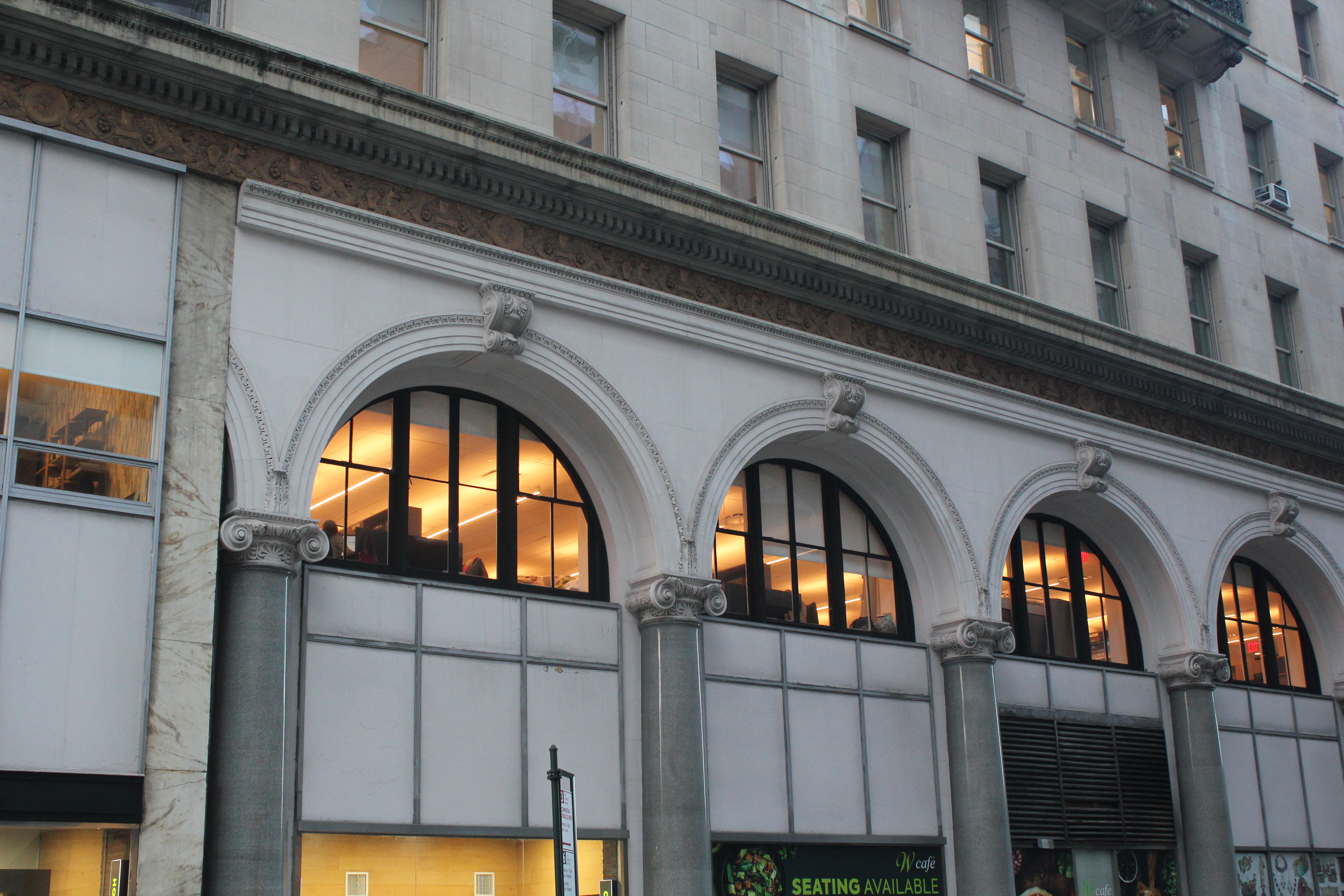
36th Street facade

Williams Real Estate, which was hired to rent out 390 Fifth Avenue's office space, recommended customizing each story's design to a specific tenant. Williams opened a rental office at the building in November 1959, while renovation was underway. Early the next year, Coquette's shoe store took over the former storefront. The office space was leased by several manufacturers of men's and boys' clothing, including shirt company F. Jacobson & Sons, which was the building's largest tenant and occupied two and a half floors. In 1961, a year after the renovation was completed, the building had 40 office tenants that occupied 90 percent of the space. The storefront was being used by a store named Dennison's Party Bazaar by 1962.

==== Later years ====
In January 1970, United States Realty Investments sold the building and the lease to Jacques Schwalbe. The building and its lease were given to 390 Fifth LLC, a limited liability company affiliated with the Schwalbe family, in 1996. Around the same time, changes were made to the storefront facade. The Dennison's Party Bazaar store subsequently became Party Bazaar and lasted through the 1990s. Menswear companies continued to occupy the building through that decade. In December 1998, the New York City Landmarks Preservation Commission (LPC) designated the building as an official city landmark.

By 2000, the owner had hired architect Andrew Tedesco and decorator Eric Cohler to restore White's original facade in paint. The owner proposed painting 80 sheets of signboard, each measuring 4 by 8 feet (1.2 by 2.4 m); the signboards would then be affixed to the exterior. The plan would have cost $7 million. The LPC opposed the proposal, and the Schwalbes withdrew the plan before the LPC could vote on it. The Schwalbes then hired architect Arthur Kahane to draw up plans for a full restoration of the building in the 2010s. The Schwalbe family had also taken out a loan from Maverick Real Estate Partners, on which they owed $41 million by the end of 2025. Maverick attempted to foreclose on the loan in early 2026, but a judge paused the foreclosure that February after finding evidence of predatory conduct from the lenders; the foreclosure proceeding was allowed to resume the next month.

== Reception ==
In its early years, 390 Fifth Avenue was lauded for its design. Augustin-Adolphe Rey, a French architectural critic, referred to 390 Fifth Avenue as "the most beautiful business building in the world" in 1904. An Architectural Record article from 1907 dubbed the building "a surprise and a joy" to passersby on Fifth Avenue, and that "compared to the Gorham Building, the Tiffany Building is by way of being frivolous". The Architectural Record writer stated that the design of the 36th Street facade stood out more than the Fifth Avenue facade and that the exterior was best enjoyed from the east side of Fifth Avenue. A critic in 1912 said that following the construction of the Tiffany & Co, Gorham, and Knickerbocker Trust Company buildings, "the standard of excellence in commercial architecture was raised to a height previously unknown."

Some of the building's praise concerned Stanford White's role in its design. in 1908, a critic for New York Architect said that 390 Fifth Avenue was among McKim, Mead & White's "best designs [...] for a commercial edifice, both from a monumental and practical point of view". Another writer referred to the building as White's "best piece of work" as well as "perhaps the [United States'] most beautiful store building".

== See also ==
- List of New York City Designated Landmarks in Manhattan from 14th to 59th Streets
