= Allan Arbus =

American actor and photographer (1918–2013)

- As Dr. Sidney Freedman on M*A*S*H
- Born: Allan Franklin Arbus; February 15, 1918; New York City, U.S.
- Died: April 19, 2013 (aged 95); Los Angeles, California, U.S.
- Occupations: Actor, photographer
- Years active: 1961–2000
- Spouses: Diane Nemerov (m. 1941; div. 1969); Mariclare Costello (m. 1977)
- Children: 3, including Doon and Amy Arbus

Allan Franklin Arbus (February 15, 1918 – April 19, 2013) was an American actor and photographer. He was the former husband of photographer Diane Arbus. He is known for his role as psychiatrist Dr. Sidney Freedman on the CBS television series M*A*S*H.

== Early life ==
Arbus was born in New York City, to a Jewish family, the son of fur retailer Harry Arbus and his wife Rose (née Goldberg). He attended DeWitt Clinton High School in the Bronx, where he first developed an interest in acting while appearing in a student play.

Also a music lover, before becoming an actor, he was reportedly so taken by Benny Goodman's recordings that he took up playing the clarinet.

== Photography career ==
During the 1940s, Arbus became a photographer for the United States Army. In 1946, after he completed his military service, he and his first wife, photographer Diane Arbus (née Nemerov, whom he had married in 1941), started a photographic advertising business in Manhattan. Arbus was primarily known for advertising photography that appeared in Glamour, Seventeen, Vogue, Harper's Bazaar, and other magazines, as well as the weekly newspaper advertising photography for Russeks, a Fifth Avenue department store in Manhattan co-founded by Diane's grandfather, Frank Russek.

Edward Steichen's noted photo exhibition The Family of Man includes a photograph credited to the couple. The Arbuses' professional partnership ended in 1956, when Diane quit the business; the couple formally separated three years later. Allan Arbus continued on as a solo photographer, but had given up the business to pursue an acting career by the time the couple divorced in 1969.

== Acting career ==
After the breakup of his first marriage and the dissolution of his business, Arbus moved to California in 1969 to pursue a new career in acting. His new career took off after he landed the lead role in Robert Downey Sr.'s 1972 cult film, Greaser's Palace, in which he appears with Robert Downey, Jr., who would go on to star as Diane Arbus's muse in Fur. The 2006 Fur is a fictional account of the end of the Arbuses' marriage. Arbus also starred opposite Bette Davis in Scream, Pretty Peggy (1973), and was featured as Gregory LaCava in W.C. Fields and Me (1976).

These roles led to his casting as Maj. Sidney Freedman on M*A*S*H. His work on M*A*S*H helped his career as a character actor, and he eventually appeared in more than seventy TV shows and movies. He appeared briefly in the 1973 film Cinderella Liberty as a drunken sailor; another 1973 film, Coffy (starring Pam Grier), featured Arbus as a drug dealer with strange sexual needs; in Damien - Omen II (1978), he played Pasarian, one of Damien's many victims in The Omen trilogy. In 1979, he portrayed a dance choreographer in The Electric Horseman.

Arbus is far better known for his television work, which includes over forty-five titles, with works as recent as Curb Your Enthusiasm in 2000. Among Arbus's non-M*A*S*H work for television are guest and recurring roles in such television series as Law & Order, In the Heat of the Night, L.A. Law, Matlock, Starsky and Hutch, and Judging Amy.

== Personal life and death ==
Allan and Diane Arbus married in 1941, Allan having dated Diane since she was age 14. They had two daughters, photographer Amy Arbus, and writer and art director Doon Arbus. The couple separated in 1959 and divorced in 1969.

Arbus married actress Mariclare Costello in 1977. The couple had one daughter, Arin Arbus, who is the artistic director at Theatre for a New Audience.

Arbus died of congestive heart failure on April 19, 2013, in Los Angeles. He was 95. He was cremated and his ashes given to his family.

== Selected filmography ==
Year	Title	Role	Type	Notes
1961	Hey, Let's Twist!	The doctor	Film	(Uncredited)
1969	Putney Swope	Mr. Bad News	Film	
1971	The Christian Licorice Store	Monroe (Smith)	Film	
1972	Cisco Pike	Sim Valensi	Film	
1972	Greaser's Palace	Jessy	Film	
1973	The Young Nurses	Krebs	Film	
1973	Coffy	Arturo Vitroni	Film	
1973	Scream, Pretty Peggy	Dr. Saks	TV movie	(ABC)
1973	Cinderella Liberty	Drunken sailor	Film	
1974	Chopper One	Tim Seeley	TV	Episode: "Ambush"
1974	The Odd Couple	Ernie Ferguson (Hypnotist) / Mr. Lennox (Director)	TV	Episodes: "Cleanliness Is Next To Impossible", "The Hollywood Story"
1974	Law and Disorder	Dr. Richter		
1976	Hawaii Five-O	Vince Maynard	TV	Season 8
1976	W.C. Fields and Me	Gregory LaCava	Film	
1977	Raid on Entebbe	Eli Melnick	TV movie	(NBC)
1978	Damien - Omen II	Pasarian		
1978	Taxi	Jerry Martin	TV	Episode: "One-Punch Banta"
1978	The Rockford Files	Myron Katzin	TV	Episode: "Black Mirror"
1978	Wonder Woman	Bleaker	TV	Episode: "The Girl from Ilandia"
1979	Americathon	Moishe Weitzman, the 2nd Hebrab	Film	
1979	The Electric Horseman	Danny	Film	
1980	The Last Married Couple in America	Al Squib	Film	
1981	Gangster Wars	Goodman	TV movie	Also, as a TV miniseries, known as The Gangster Chronicles
1982	Quincy, M.E.	Dr. Ellerick	TV	Episode: "For Love of Joshua"
1973–1983	M*A*S*H	Major Sidney Freedman	TV	12 Episodes
1984	The World of Don Camillo	Christ (voice)	Film	In Italian and English
1985	Cagney & Lacey	Arthur Stacey	TV	Episode: "Violation"
1985	Volunteers	Albert Bardenaro	Film	
1985	Hardcastle and McCormick	Dr. Friedman	TV	Episode: "Do Not Go Gentle"
1986	Crossroads	Dr. Santis	Film	
1986	Walt Disney's Wonderful World of Color (anthology)	Dr. Andreas Hellman	TV movie	A Fighting Choice
1987	From the Hip	Phil Ames	Film	
1987	Spies	Jano	TV	Episode: "Baby"
1987	Daniel and the Towers	Simon 'Sam' Rodia	TV movie	(Wonder Works, PBS)
1987	Ohara	Sol Rostoff	TV	Episode: "The Intruders"
1987	Duet	Mr. Coleman	TV	Episode: "Born, Bred and Buttered in Brooklyn"
1987	Matlock	Peter Leoni	TV	Episode: "The Chef"
1989	L.A. Law	Lawrence Stone	TV	Episode: I'm in the Nude for Love
1989	Matlock	Aaron Mitchell	TV	Episode: "The Star"
1989	When He's Not a Stranger	Judge Thomas J. Gray	TV movie	
1990	Hunter	Norman Tate	TV	Episode: "Unfinished Business"
1991	Stat	Hesh Cooper	TV	Episodes: "Safe Smuggling" & "Fantasy"
1991–1992	Brooklyn Bridge	Dr. Schulman	TV	3 episodes
1993	Law & Order	Dominique Keith	TV	Episode: "Animal Instinct"
1993	Josh and S.A.M.	Businessman on plane	Film	
1992–1993	In The Heat of the Night	Dr. Atwill	TV	Episodes: "Discovery", “A Frenzied Affair” & "Little Girl Lost"
1994	Mad About You	Albert	TV	Episode: "The Last Scampi"
1997	In Dark Places	Dory		
1998	L.A. Doctors	Mr. Mitski	TV	Episode: "A Prayer for the living"
1999	NYPD Blue	Seymore Epstein	TV	Episode: "Don't Meth with Me"
1999	Judging Amy	Judge Fowler	TV	3 episodes
2000	Curb Your Enthusiasm	Uncle Nathan	TV	Episode: "The Group"
2016	Chief Zabu	George Dankworth	Film	(In production from 1986, completed and released 2016)
