= Russeks =

Former New York City department store

Coordinates: 40°44′59″N 73°59′03″W

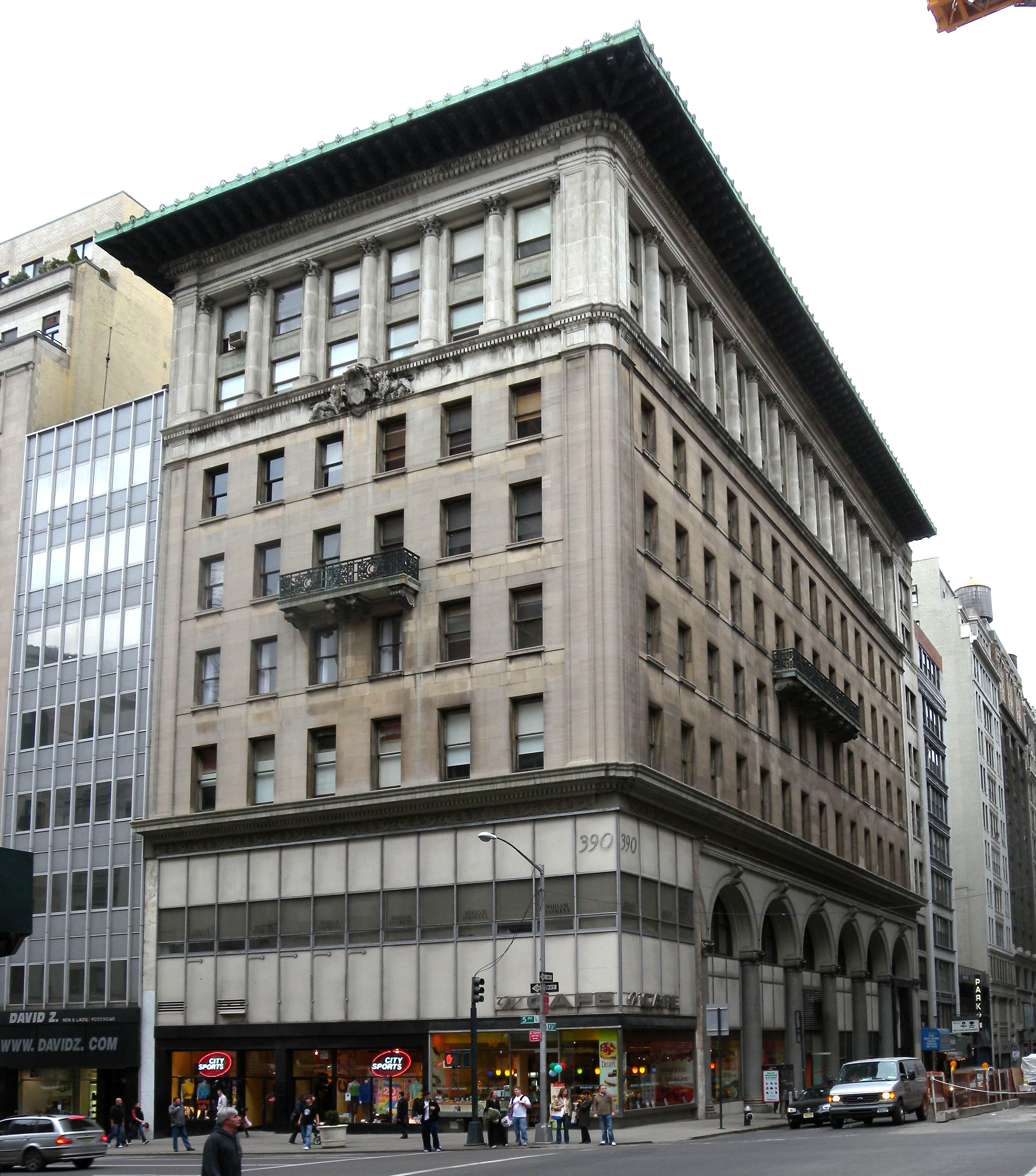
- 390 Fifth Avenue, earlier Russeks flagship store, in 2009
- Company type: Public
- Industry: Retail
- Founded: 1885; 141 years ago in New York City, United States
- Founders: Frank Russek and Isidore H. Russek
- Headquarters: 390 Fifth Avenue, New York City, United States
- Number of locations: 4 stores (1949)
- Products: Women's furs, coats, suits, gowns, and dresses, and attire for girls and young women.
- Number of employees: 1,100+ (1945)
- Divisions: Maternity Modes and Maternity Sportswear

Russeks was a fashionable ladies' fur and clothing department store at 390 Fifth Avenue, at the intersection with West 36th Street, in Midtown Manhattan, New York City, a building also known as the Gorham Building. The company was founded in 1885 by brothers Frank Russek and Isidore H. Russek. In addition to its Manhattan flagship store, it opened stores in Brooklyn, Chicago, and Philadelphia, and in 1945 it had over 1,100 employees. In 1948, it was one of the largest stores in the world that specialized only in women's furs, coats, suits, and dresses.

== History ==
=== Early years ===
The Russeks as a fur family dated back to prior to 1823.

The company Russeks started as a furrier in Manhattan in New York City, co-founded in 1885 by brothers Frank Russek (a Jewish immigrant born in Bolesławiec, Poland, and later particularly active in the United Jewish Appeal) and Isidore H. Russek. It opened in 1901 at 19th Street and Sixth Avenue in Manhattan with less than $1,000 ($39,000 in current dollar terms) in capital, starting with muffs and fur scarfs, and expanded into luxury clothing and accessories, and became Russeks Fifth Avenue, Inc.

In 1905 they moved to 23rd Street, in 1911 they moved to 34th Street between Fifth Avenue and Sixth Avenue, and in 1913 they moved to 362 Fifth Avenue.

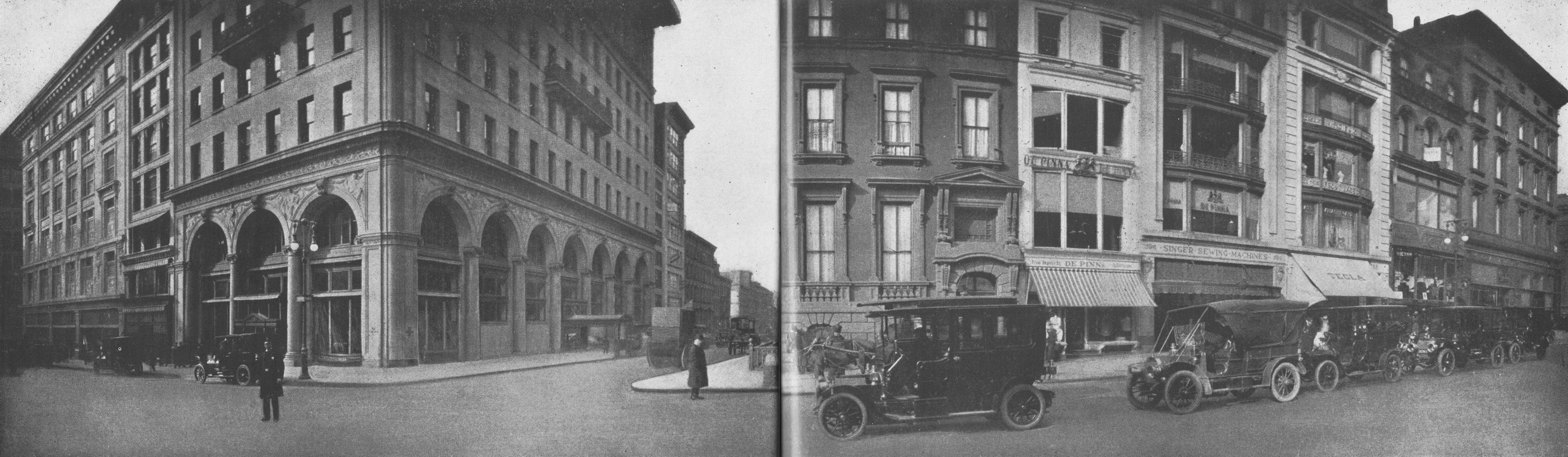
390 Fifth Avenue (at left) in 1911 - the lower floors were changed after Russeks moved out

In September 1924, by which time the store was one of the leading fur stores in New York City, they opened a women's apparel department store on the eight floors of the southwest corner of 390 Fifth Avenue and West 36th Street in Manhattan, which at the time was the most fashionable shopping area in the United States. The store sold among other items frocks, wraps, hats, dress accessories, ermine, Russian sables, dresses, gowns, coats, ensemble suits, tailored suits, and shoes, including new fashions from Paris. The building had been designed by architect Stanford White of McKim, Mead & White, and completed in 1904-05 for the Gorham Manufacturing Company.

In 1928, net profits of the store were $357,000 ($6,694,000 in current dollar terms). In 1933, the store adopted a new policy, under which it would be devoted solely to furs and ready-to-wear items. In 1934, net profits of the store after taxes were $103,000 ($2,462,000 in current dollar terms), and in 1935 they were $220,000 ($5,167,000 in current dollar terms). In August 1937, the company opened a store in Brooklyn in a five-story building on the northwest corner of Fulton Street and Bridge Street. In 1938, the company had a net loss of $126,000 ($2,882,000 in current dollar terms), and in 1939 it had a net profit of $54,000 ($1,239,000 in current dollar terms).

=== 1940–49 ===
In July 1940, the company opened up a store at 200 North Michigan Avenue in Chicago, Illinois. It was the first retail establishment in the Midwest to be entirely equipped with fluorescent lighting, and was noted for being entirely air conditioned.

On August 29, 1940, the Manhattan store had its largest sales day ever, with close to 10,000 customers, 30% of whom were men who "accompanied their women folk," according to The New York Times. The newspaper reported that the imminence of conscription for war, and a possible desire by consumers to turn their cash into merchandise with war on the horizon, were noted as factors promoting the big sales day. In 1940, the company had a net profit of $112,000 ($2,585,000 in current dollar terms), in 1941 it had a net profit of $201,000 ($4,406,000 in current dollar terms), in 1942 it had a net profit of $293,000 ($5,765,000 in current dollar terms), and in 1943 it had a net profit of $406,000 ($7,559,000 in current dollar terms). In 1941, at 18 years of age the granddaughter of co-founder Frank Russek and daughter of future chairman David Nemerov, Diane Nemerov (later known as Diane Arbus), married Allan Arbus, and they both went to work for the Russeks advertising department, and eventually became successful fashion photographers. In January 1943, the company issued bonuses to its 800 employees across its three stores, primarily in US War Saving Bonds; by the following year it had over 1,000 employees.

In 1946, the company had a net profit of $1,272,000 ($20,995,000 in current dollar terms), and in 1949 it dropped to $472,000 ($6,383,000 in current dollar terms) on lower sales and higher operating costs. In 1948, it was one of the largest stores in the world that specialized only in women's furs, coats, suits, and dresses. In September 1949, the company opened up its fourth store in the U.S., a four-floor women's wear store at 1212 Chestnut Street in Philadelphia, Pennsylvania, devoted to furs, dresses, coats, suits, and attire for girls and young women.

After arriving in the United States from Europe after World War 2 in 1949, Holocaust survivor Marion Wiesel worked at the department store as a salesperson.

=== Later years ===
In 1950, the company had an increased net profit of $581,000 ($7,771,000 in current dollar terms), in 1951 it had a lower net profit of $135,000 ($1,679,000 in current dollar terms), and in 1952 it had a net loss of $286,000 ($3,473,000 in current dollar terms). In June 1952, it closed its Philadelphia store, saying that business was unprofitable and did not warrant further investment. In September 1954, it opened a suburban store in the Cross County Shopping Center in Yonkers, Westchester, New York, selling women's sportswear, dresses, coats, suits, furs, millinery, and accessories, as well as children's coats and dresses. In September 1955, it opened a shop selling furs at the Savoy-Plaza Hotel, at Fifth Avenue and East 59th Street in Midtown Manhattan. In 1954, the company had a net loss of $135,000 ($1,623,000 in current dollar terms), and in 1955 it had a net loss of $120,000 ($1,445,000 in current dollar terms), while its Yonkers and Savoy-Plaza Hotel units showed profits.

In February 1957, at which time it was being traded on the American Stock Exchange, a group of investors from Chicago purchased a controlling 57% interest in the company, and that year the company closed its Chicago store. Reportedly once the leader in the U.S. in sales of furs, it was at the time still a leader but sales had decreased a significant amount. The company also announced that one if its new investors, new controlling shareholder Joseph Kassner, was its new president; the company purchased Maternity Modes and Maternity Sportswear, a 36-store maternity and retail manufacturing company headquartered in Chicago that had been headed by Kassner, and it became a division of Russeks with its goods sold at Russeks stores. In September 1957, it opened its second suburban store, a women's wear store in the Garden State Plaza Shopping Center in Paramus, New Jersey; it moved out in 1960.

In 1956, the company had a net loss of $630,000 ($7,466,000 in current dollar terms), and in 1957 it had a net loss of $128,000 ($1,464,000 in current dollar terms). In early 1959, the company announced that it would close its store on 36th Street and Fifth Avenue that it had opened 35 years prior, after five years of losses, but said that it would continue to operate in the Savoy-Hilton Hotel, and in Brooklyn, Paramus, and Yonkers. In 1959, the company had a net loss of $740,000 ($8,175,000 in current dollar terms).
