= 200 Madison Avenue =

Office building in Manhattan, New York

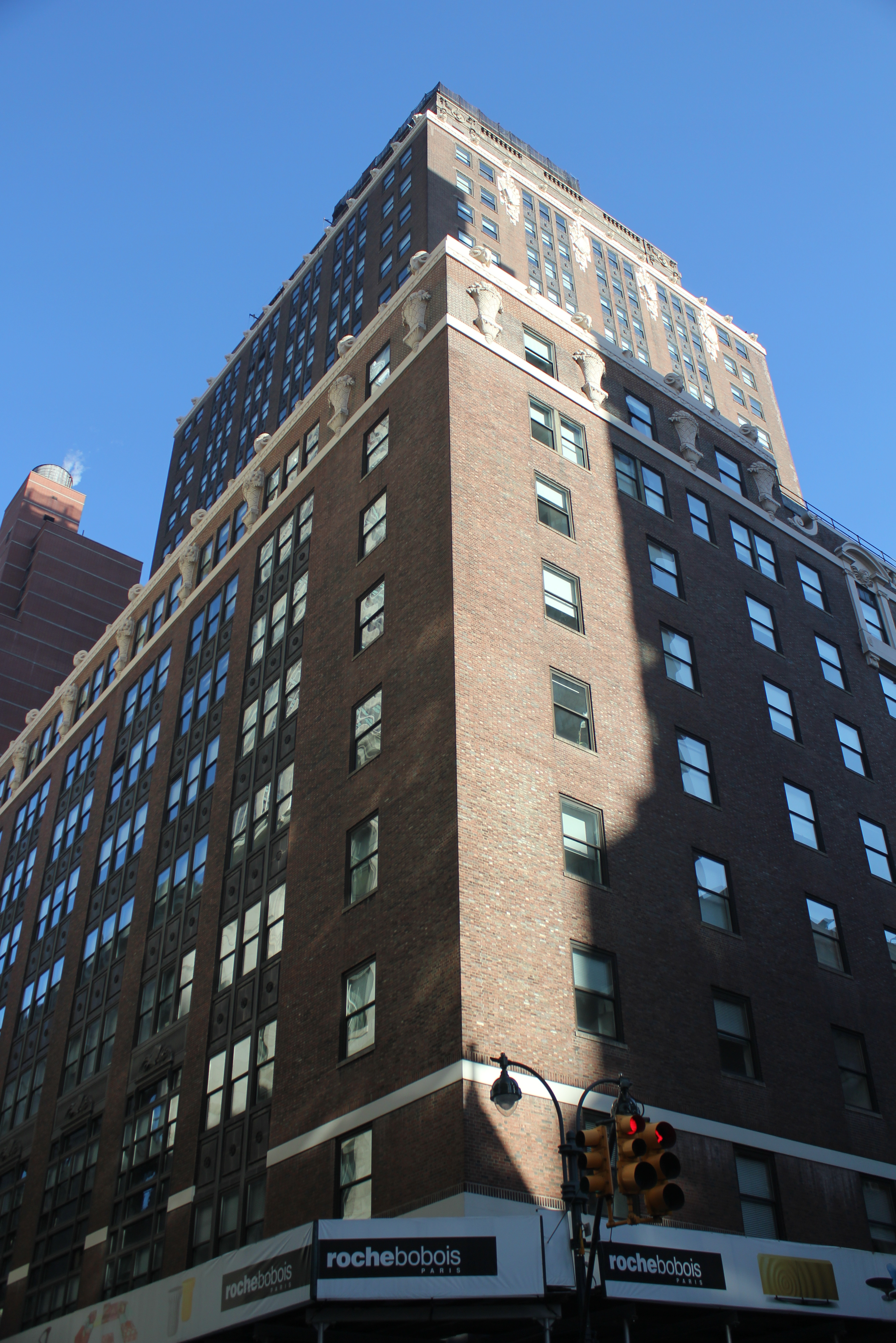
- Seen from the south
- Interactive map of the 200 Madison Avenue area
- Alternative names: Tower Building, Astor Estate Building, Marshall Field Estate Building, International Combustion Engineering Tower

General information
- Location: Manhattan, New York
- Coordinates: 40°44′56″N 73°58′58″W
- Construction started: 1925
- Completed: 1926

Height
- Roof: 385 ft (117 m)

Technical details
- Floor count: 25

Design and construction
- Architect: Warren and Wetmore
- Main contractor: Flintlock Company

New York City Landmark
- Designated: November 9, 2021
- Reference no.: 2654
- Designated entity: Interior: arcade, elevator lobby

200 Madison Avenue (also known as the Marshall Field Building, Astor Estate Building, International Combustion Building, and Tower Building) is a 25-story office building in the Murray Hill neighborhood of Manhattan in New York City. It is along the west side of Madison Avenue between 35th and 36th Streets. Designed by Warren and Wetmore, it was built from 1925 to 1926.

200 Madison Avenue's facade is largely made of red brick with limestone trim, as well as window spandrels made of terracotta and cast iron. The ground story is made of limestone and contains entrances from Madison Avenue, 35th Street, and 36th Street. The building contains a setback above its ninth story. The T-shaped lobby is designed in a neo-Renaissance style, with a north–south arcade connecting 35th and 36th Streets, as well as an elevator lobby extending toward Madison Avenue. The lobby's ornate interior contains gilded decorations and various animal motifs. Due to zoning restrictions on the eastern part of the site, the lower stories originally served as an apartment hotel, while the smaller upper stories contained offices.

Since the 1910s, the Astor family had wanted to develop a commercial building on the site, but the plans were delayed for a decade due to opposition from J. P. Morgan Jr. and other local residents. 200 Madison Avenue was developed by a syndicate that included Texas entrepreneur Jesse H. Jones. The building was originally known for its largest tenants, Marshall Field and Company and International Combustion. The apartment hotel initially occupied the second through ninth floors, but it was unprofitable, closed in 1939, and was turned into office space, with tenants such as Amtorg Trading Corporation. The building was sold several times in the 20th century, including to a group representing Philippine president Ferdinand Marcos during the 1980s. George V. Comfort and the Loeb Realty and Development Corporation acquired 200 Madison Avenue in the 1990s, and the New York City Landmarks Preservation Commission designated the building's lobby as an official landmark in 2021.

== Site ==
200 Madison Avenue occupies the eastern half of a city block in the Midtown Manhattan neighborhood of New York City, bounded by 35th Street on the south, Madison Avenue on the east, and 36th Street on the north; the city block extends westward to Fifth Avenue. The building's land lot has a total area of 40,981 ft^{2} (3,807.3 m^{2}); it measures 197.5 ft (60.2 m) from north to south and 220 ft (67 m) from west to east. The building occupies nearly its entire lot, with a frontage of 194 ft (59 m) on Madison Avenue, 196 ft (60 m) on 35th Street, and 220 feet on 36th Street.

200 Madison Avenue is close to the B. Altman and Company Building to the south, the Collectors Club of New York to the southeast, the Church of the Incarnation to the east, and the Morgan Library & Museum. In addition, the Gorham Building at 390 Fifth Avenue, the Tiffany and Company Building at 401 Fifth Avenue, and the Stewart & Company Building at 404 Fifth Avenue are each less than a block away to the west.

== Architecture ==
The building was designed by Warren and Wetmore. It is 25 stories tall, measuring 374 ft (114 m) to its roof and 385 ft (117 m) to its pinnacle.

=== Form and facade ===
The exterior of the building contains a granite water table. Above that, the first story is clad with limestone. On both 35th and 36th Streets, the entrances are within recessed openings and contain five brass doors each. The 35th Street entrance is also topped by a transom window. The lowest nine stories occupy the entire site.

The upper stories contain a facade of red brick with limestone trim. The Madison Avenue elevation of the facade is made almost entirely of brick, except at several places where there is limestone trim. On the 35th and 36th Street elevations, only the outermost bays of windows are made of brick. The remaining bays are separated horizontally by brick piers; within each bay, the windows on different floors are separated horizontally by black spandrels. The spandrels on the second and third stories are made of ornamental ironwork, splitting each bay into multi-part windows. The spandrels on higher stories are made of dull black terracotta and divide each bay into three windows. Robert A. M. Stern and the co-authors of his book New York 1930 wrote that the facades "hardly resulted in the 'Masterpiece of Modern Architecture' claimed by the Real Estate Record and Guide, but they responded sensitively to the residential scale and character of the Murray Hill district".

There is a setback on the eastern elevation above the ninth story, measuring 45 ft (14 m) deep. Behind this setback, the building tapers into a narrower tower. This is because the eastern portion of the site was formerly zoned to allow only residential use, while the western portion could also accommodate commercial use. The offices were above the ninth story which occupied only the western part of the site. The lowest nine stories (which occupied the whole site) were originally an apartment hotel. The northern and southern elevations contain a setback above the eleventh or twelfth story. The restriction on the Madison Avenue portion of the site expired in 1940.

=== Interior ===
Originally, the building had 600,000 ft^{2} (56,000 m^{2}) of rentable space, making it the sixth-largest office building in the United States. At the extreme end of the 36th Street frontage is a pair of driveways, connecting to a loading dock with two freight elevators. An interior loading dock was uncommon in structures built around the same time.

==== Lobby ====
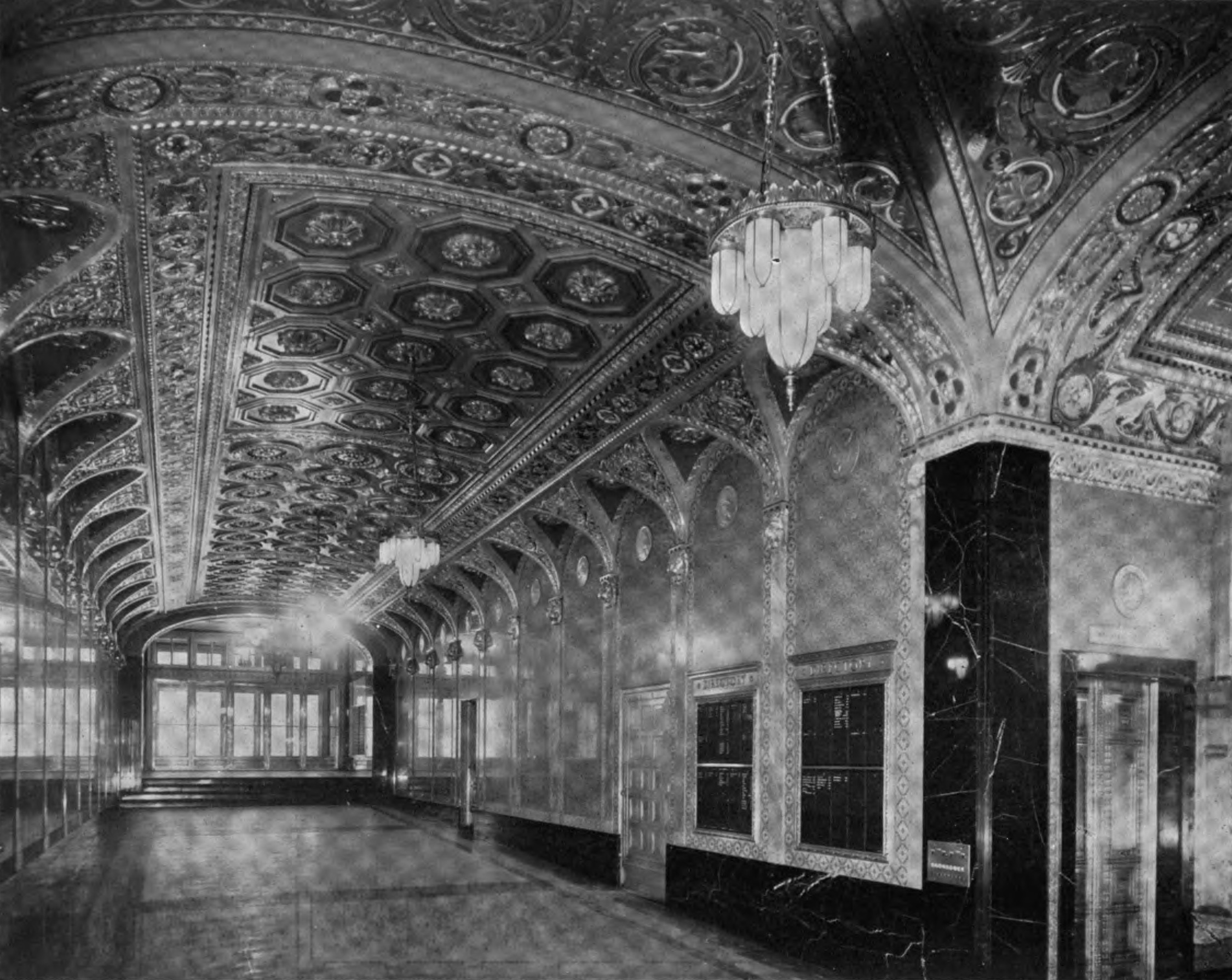
Main arcade, looking toward 36th Street

The lobby is designed in a neo-Renaissance style, but it also contains details of Baroque and 18th-century English architecture. The main entrances are from 35th and 36th Streets, connected by a broad north–south arcade. At the center, a transverse corridor connects to the elevator lobby, which has ten elevators. This gives the lobby a roughly T-shaped plan. Because of the topography of the area, the 36th Street entrance is higher than the 35th Street entrance. As a result, the north–south arcade is one story high at its north end and two stories high at its south end; the corridor has three sets of three marble steps. Originally, the Madison Avenue entrance led to a separate lobby for the hotel rooms, but it was connected to the elevator lobby when the hotel closed.

There are foyers just inside the 35th and 36th Street entrances. Both contain marble walls, a set of five doors to the arcade, and a black marble arch. The side walls of the 36th Street foyer contain brass-framed grilles, with a door on the western wall. The 36th Street foyer's marble arch is directly above the doors there, which are topped by two grilles and three gold panels. The side walls of the 35th Street foyer are trimmed with floral decorations, and the ceiling has neoclassical reliefs. There are transom windows above the doors in the 35th Street foyer. Just north of these doors, the foyer has a saucer-domed ceiling decorated with rosettes, followed by that foyer's marble arch. Below the saucer dome, the corners have decorative pendentives, while the side walls have lunette panels depicting animals. These include motifs of dodos, peacocks, and dragons.

The main arcade contains a patterned terrazzo floor, made of yellow and pink tiles. The tiles are rhombus-shaped and are laid in a chevron pattern. The main section of the floor is surrounded by a patterned marble border made of dark yellow Siena, pink Verona, and Bois Jourdan marble. The outermost section of the floor is made of blue marble. The side walls are also made of pink marble above a black baseboard. Each wall is separated at regular intervals by yellow-marble pilasters. The capitals of each pilaster contain moldings of lion heads, which support round arches on the ceiling. Between these lions' heads are medallions that symbolize horses, sheep, and rams. The eastern wall contains two tenant directories and two brass doors, to the north of the elevator hall. The center of the western wall (facing the elevator hall) includes a brass door to the freight loading dock, which is flanked by black-marble panels and topped by a lunette with birds. There is a reception desk in front of this door. The barrel-vaulted ceiling is ornately decorated with circular and octagonal reliefs and medallions.

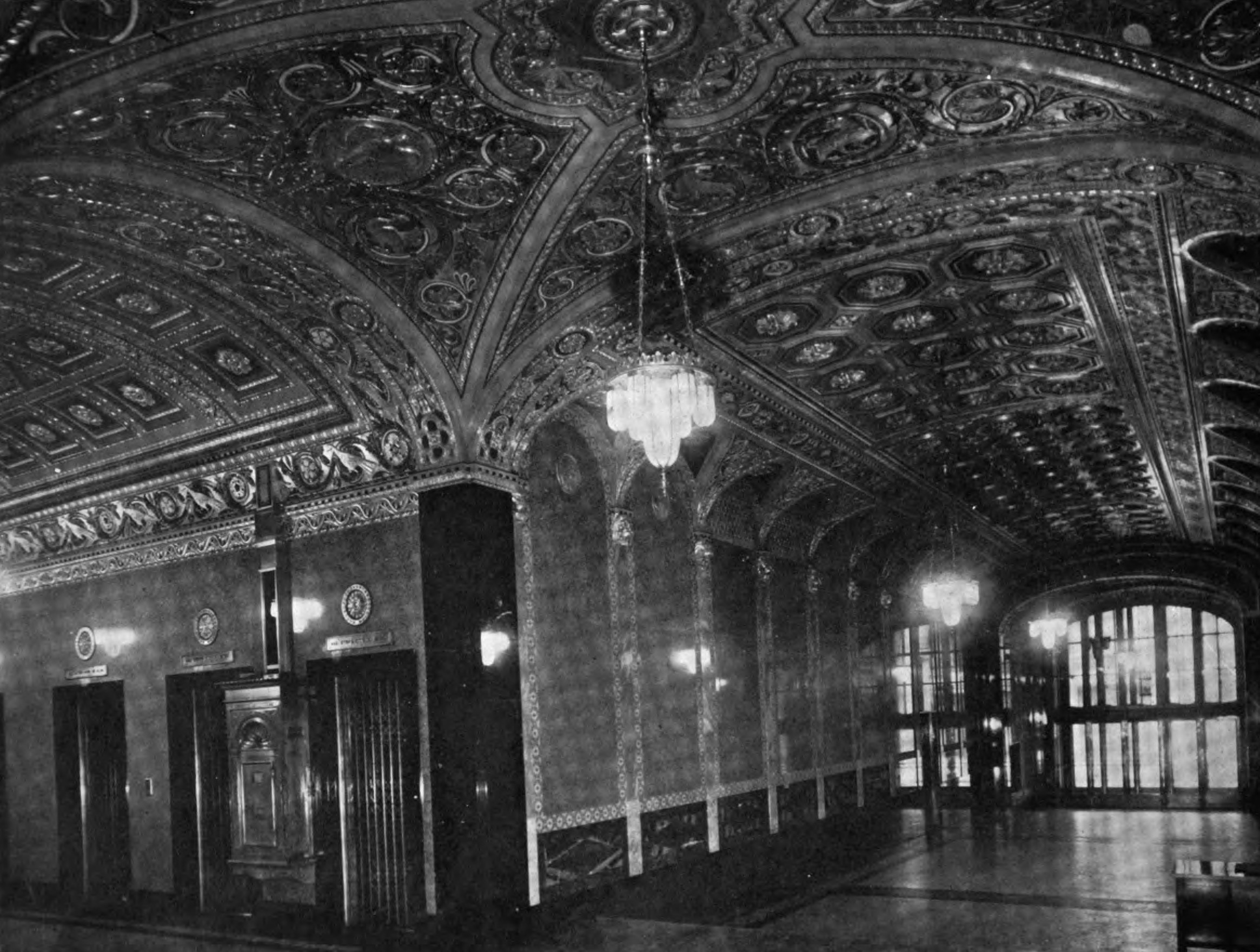
Intersection of the elevator lobby (left) and arcade (right)

There is a groin vault above the intersection of the arcade and the elevator lobby, with black marble pilasters at each corner. The elevator lobby is about 13 ft (4.0 m) wide, with similar floors to the arcade. Turnstiles are installed in front of the elevator lobby, restricting access to tenants and guests. The shallow barrel-vaulted ceiling contains a grid of rosettes within squares; the north and south edges of the ceiling contain gilded moldings, as well as friezes with peacocks. Below the friezes, the north and south walls contain elevator doors, as well as brass mailboxes resting atop marble sills. There are four elevators to the north and six to the south; their doors are made of brass, with vertically arranged motifs of arches and rosettes. Each set of elevator doors is surrounded by a black-marble frame. The elevator lobby leads east to a double brass door, above which is a gilded lunette panel.

==== Upper stories ====
Originally, the building contained an apartment hotel on its lower floors and offices on its upper floors. The ground and second floors contained stores. There were also apartments on the second through ninth floors, extending about 40 ft (12 m) deep into the building from either side. The apartments on the eighth and ninth stories were double-story duplex units. There were about 56 units in total. Each of the lower stories occupies about 36,000 ft^{2} (3,300 m^{2}).

The building had 530,000 ft^{2} (49,000 m^{2}) of rentable space after the apartment hotel was converted to offices. Some of the office tenants redecorated their spaces. Parts of the second through fourth stories were occupied by a Marshall Field's department store, which had its own elevator and staircases. The showroom of fashion firm Warner Brothers Co. contained 12 selling rooms, as well as offices for various departments and a foyer with green-and-peach walls. The foyer of fashion firm Venus Foundations' office contained a blue-and-gray mural, a statue of the Venus de Milo, and a mirrored wall. Venus Foundations' offices also had a Pompeian-themed showroom and private sales offices.

== History ==
In the 19th century, the section of Madison Avenue in Murray Hill was largely a residential street inhabited by wealthy families. The Astor family owned eight houses at 200–214 Madison Avenue, on the western sidewalk between 35th and 36th Streets. These houses were built around 1870 and were known as "Astor Row"; their residents had included Adrian Iselin and John Edward Parsons. The Astor family also owned ten adjacent lots, five each on 35th and 36th Streets.

Manhattan's Silk District, concentrated around the lower section of Park Avenue South in the 19th century, had moved northward to the intersection of Madison Avenue and 34th Street by the early 1920s. During that time, the upper-class residences that had characterized the adjacent portion of Madison Avenue in the 19th century were being replaced with retail establishments. The Astors supported the area's commercial development, but the financier J. P. Morgan Jr., who lived just northeast of the Astor houses, opposed the changes. In 1916, a New York state court invalidated the Murray Hill Restrictive Agreement, an 1847 covenant restricting the development of non-residential buildings on Madison Avenue. This prompted Morgan and a local community organization, the Murray Hill Association, to buy land in an effort to prevent commercial developments.

=== Development ===
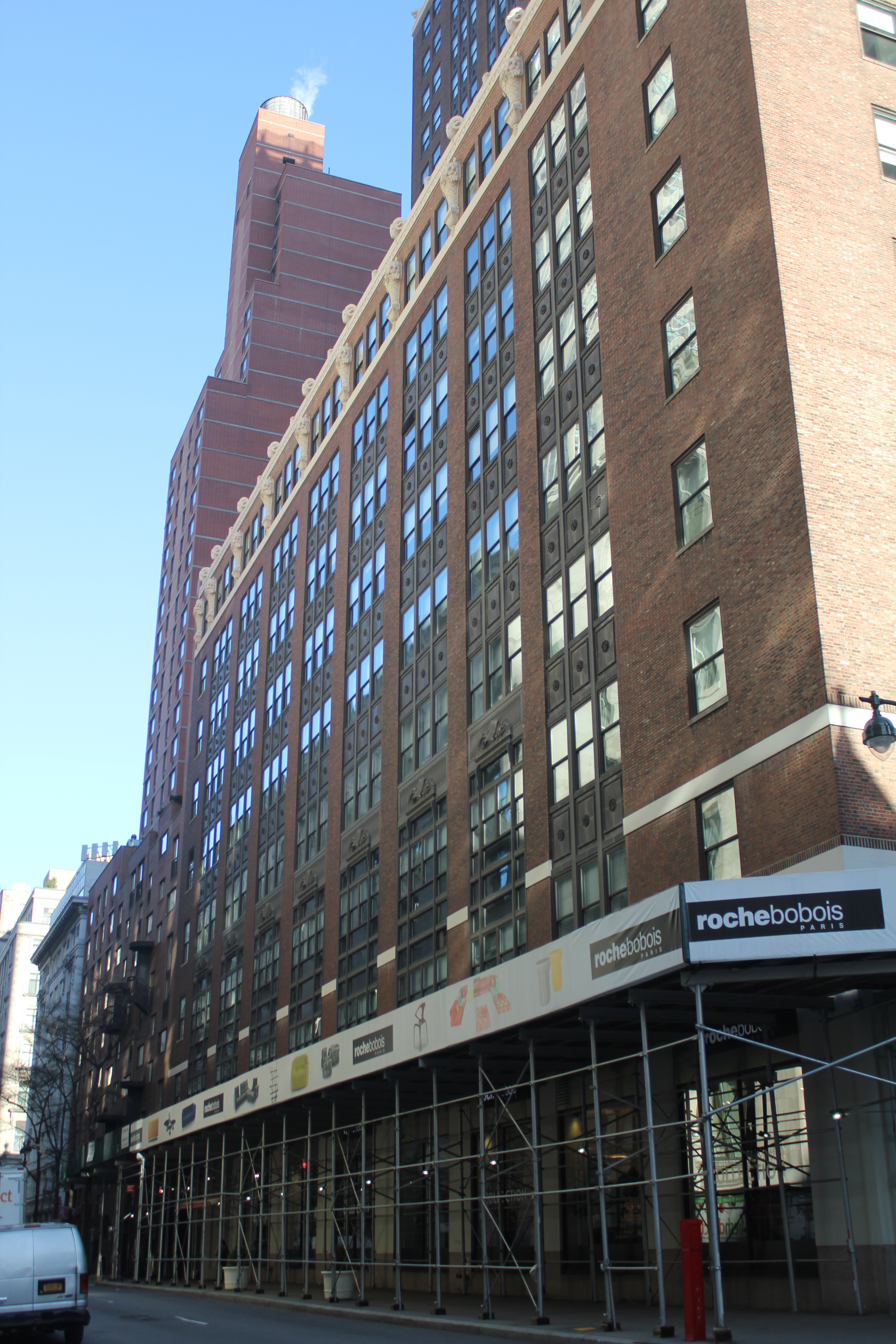
View of the building along 35th Street

Most of Midtown Manhattan was rezoned for commercial use as part of the 1916 Zoning Resolution, except for the section of Madison Avenue in Murray Hill. Accordingly, the New York City Board of Estimate initially did not allow William Waldorf Astor to build a commercial building on Madison Avenue between 35th and 36th Streets. Despite Morgan's opposition, Astor still wished to erect the building. Astor had hired the firm of Peabody, Wilson & Brown to design a seven-story commercial building on the site, and he filed plans for the building in December 1917. Though the New York City Board of Standards and Appeals approved the building in May 1918, the Board of Estimate reversed the approval almost immediately. Astor died in 1919, but the issue remained unresolved for five years afterward. The Appellate Division of the New York Supreme Court upheld the Board of Estimate's decision in 1922. This was overturned the next year by the state's highest court, the New York Court of Appeals, which ruled that the Astors could indeed develop a commercial building on the site.

After the prolonged legal fight, the Board of Estimate voted to allow commercial development on the street in May 1924. The city government's Corporation Counsel affirmed the Board of Estimate's decision the next month. That December, a syndicate composed of Jesse H. Jones, Robert M. Catts, and Dwight P. Robinson & Co. acquired 17 dwellings on the west side of Madison Avenue between 35th and 36th Streets. The syndicate planned to build a 25-story building on the site, designed by Warren and Wetmore, for $11 million. The syndicate had been planning the structure for several months but did not officially announce the plans until after they had consulted with Morgan. Jesse H. Jones, the head of Houston Properties, had been a major real estate developer in the early 20th century, particularly in Houston, Texas.

In March 1925, Warren and Wetmore filed plans with the New York City Department of Buildings for a combined apartment hotel and office building on the site. Catts said the building had been designed to placate Morgan but did not elaborate. However, the building was to be recessed significantly above its ninth story. The same month, Stehli Silks leased two stories and a storefront, while Marshall Field and Company signed a lease for four stories. The Flintlock Company, which was hired to build the skyscraper, acquired the site that April. During construction, in October 1925, three construction workers died when a scaffold on the ninth story collapsed. The structure was completed in May 1926; it was initially known as the Tower Building, though it was also called the Marshall Field Building and the Astor Estate Building.

=== 1920s to 1950s ===
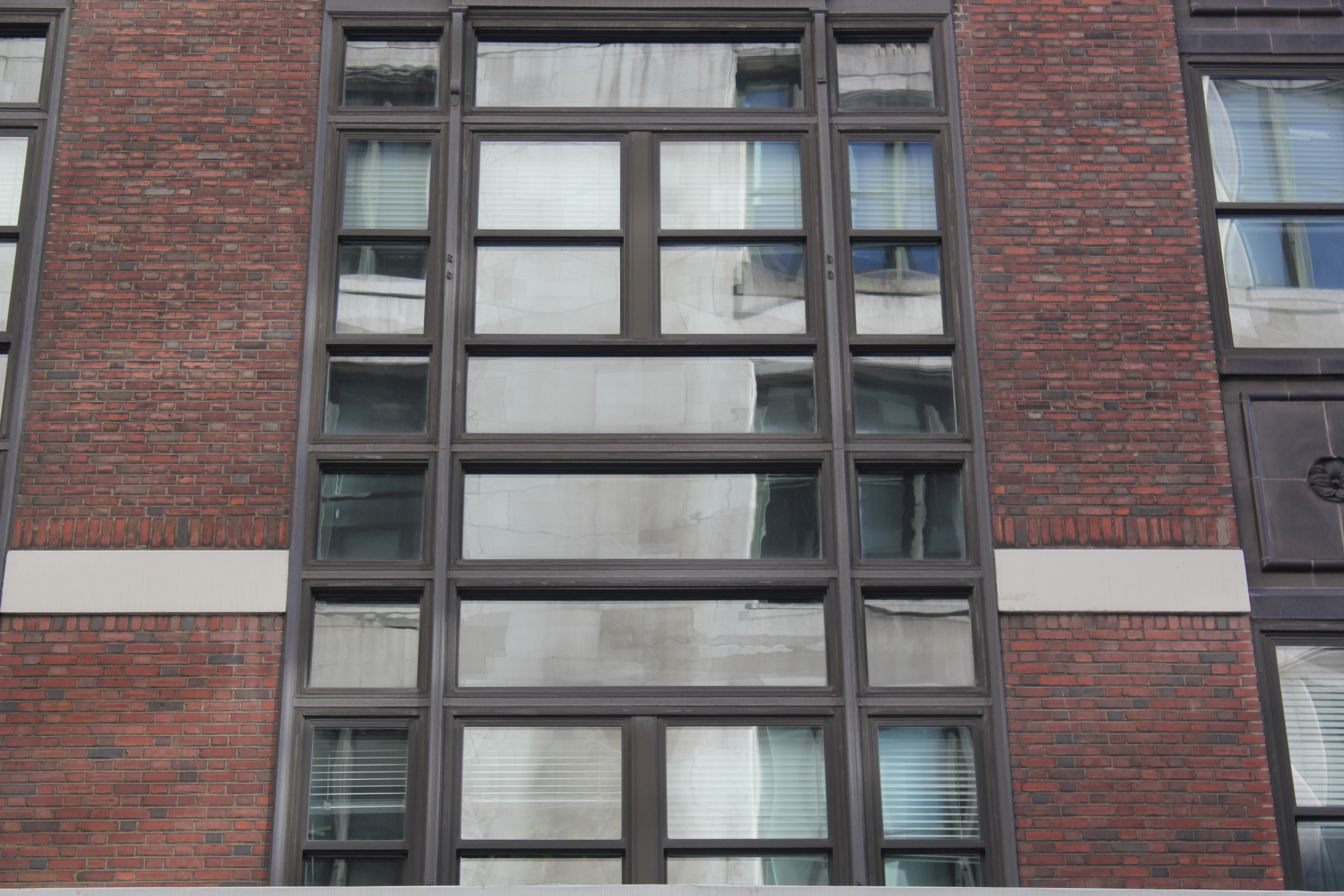
Detail of windows on lower stories

Among the early tenants were Bachmann and Emmerich (which leased two stories shortly after the building opened), as well as Champlain Silk Mills and the Hudson Blue and Photo Print Company. Jesse Jones had an office on the 11th story. International Combustion leased seven floors in the building in August 1926; after the company moved into the building in January 1927, the structure was renamed the International Combustion Building. The Philadelphia Inquirer wrote that, with International Combustion's relocation to 200 Madison Avenue and the presence of engineering firms nearby, "the trend of the engineering profession would seem now to be definitively established along Madison Avenue". By the end of the 1920s, other commercial developments had arisen along the surrounding section of Madison Avenue. During the 1930s, the building's tenants included upholstery manufacturers Collins and Aikman, the Gotham Silk Hosiery Company, and the Triborough Bridge and Tunnel Authority. Marshall Field also opened an additional showroom within the building in 1936, and Berkey & Gay Furniture and the American Enka Company also leased storefronts in the building.

The apartment hotel at 200 Madison Avenue was financially unsuccessful and lasted for only a little more than a decade. It closed in 1939, and its lobby on Madison Avenue was connected with the office lobby between 35th and 36th Streets. Soviet trade group Amtorg Trading Corporation subsequently leased the nine stories within the former apartment hotel. This made Amtorg one of the building's largest tenants, behind International Combustion (by then renamed Combustion Engineering), which occupied seven stories and parts of three others. Other large tenants included two Jewish advocacy groups, the Copper Recovery Corporation, the Kitty Kelly Corporation, and the Frank A. Hall & Sons showroom. By 1940, the New York Herald Tribune said there was a "brisk demand for space" at 200 Madison Avenue.

The Continental Bank and Trust Company foreclosed on 200 Madison Avenue in September 1941 and subsequently acquired the property. The Charles F. Noyes Company began managing leases in the building three years later. Amtorg left its offices on 200 Madison Avenue's lowest nine floors in 1950. Its space was taken up by firms such as the Simplicity Pattern Company, Aldens Inc., and Combustion Engineering, as well as publisher G. P. Putnam's Sons. A group led by Harry Mabel purchased the building in September 1954 from the Madison Avenue–36th Street Corporation. At the time, the building was valued at $6.4 million and had an outstanding mortgage of $8.5 million.

=== 1960s to 1990s ===
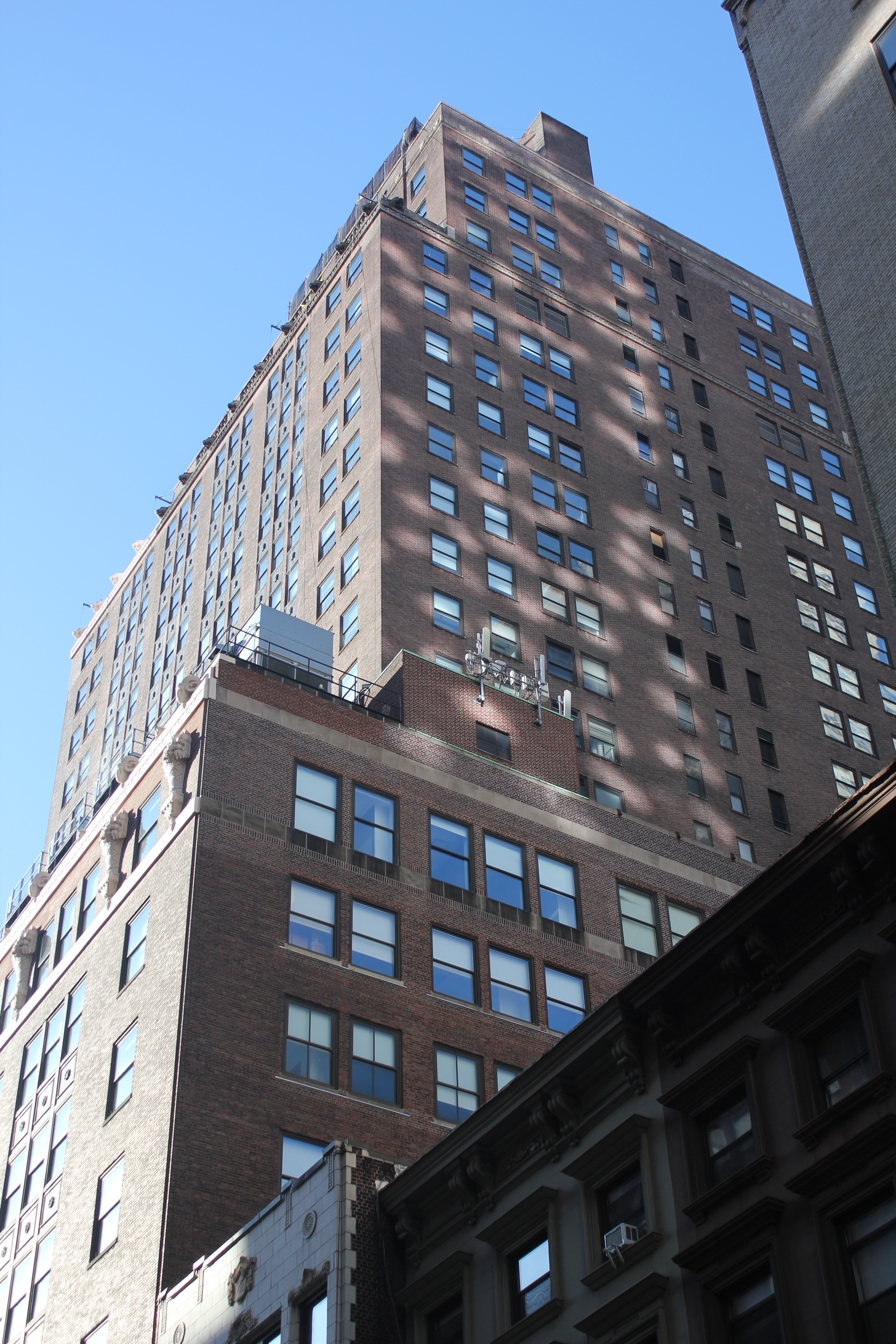
Seen from 36th Street

Maurice Urdang & Associates sold 200 Madison Avenue in 1965 to a syndicate that included Harry Helmsley, Lawrence Wien, and George V. Comfort. The New York Times reported that the building had been "recently modernized" with new air-conditioning and elevator systems. In the 1960s and 1970s, the building also housed tenants such as the Houston Chemical Corporation, mail-order company Aldens Inc., Oxford University Press, and Partnership for New York City. Joseph Bernstein and his brother Ralph Bernstein acquired 200 Madison Avenue in November 1983. The acquisition cost $50 million. At some point in the 1980s, Helmsley sold his interest in the building's ownership.

In 1986, a United States House of Representatives committee found that the Bernsteins had been working on behalf of Philippine president Ferdinand Marcos, who had intended the building and several others as a gift for his wife Imelda. (Note: Marcos was also found to have purchased several other New York City buildings; see Overseas landholdings of the Marcos family.) The Washington Post reported that in coded cables between the Marcos family and their alleged "front" in Manhattan, Gliceria Tantoco, 200 Madison Avenue was referred to using the code word "Midtown Cement". Around that time, 200 Madison Avenue and three other buildings reportedly owned by the Marcoses were placed for sale. After Marcos was forced out of office, the administration of his successor Corazon Aquino froze Marcos's assets within U.S. banking channels in March 1986. As a result, although the building incurred $1 million in taxes for the 1986–1987 fiscal year, the tax bills went unpaid. After a U.S. circuit court ruled to block the sale of the Marcos properties in November 1986, the Aquino administration filed a lawsuit against the Marcos estate to obtain title to the buildings.

The Aquino administration attempted in early 1989 to sell the four Marcos properties to Morris Bailey for $398 million. That year, federal judge Pierre N. Leval was considering placing the building for sale at a foreclosure auction. The foreclosure auction was not scheduled for at least a year. The land under the building was owned by Alexander DiLorenzo III, who was facing financial issues of his own after 87 people died in the Happy Land fire, which had occurred at another property he owned. The deed to the building was conveyed to 200 Madison Associates LP, a Delaware corporation, in 1993. The buyers paid $25 million, half of it in cash. Afterward, George V. Comfort and the Loeb Realty and Development Corporation owned the building's fee, while DiLorenzo owned the land underneath it. By then, the area was a hub for publishing companies. The Berkley Publishing Group occupied 200 Madison Avenue, and Oxford University Press was moving across the street to the B. Altman Building, having occupied 200 Madison Avenue for over two decades. By 1995, the owners of the leasehold had also purchased the land for $16.7 million.

=== 2000s to present ===
By the 21st century, the building's tenants included apparel firm Philips-Van Heusen, clothing company Garan Incorporated, and charitable organization Surdna Foundation. In addition, there were Roche Bobois and Starbucks stores at ground level. In 2016, Jamestown L.P. bought a 49 percent stake in 200 Madison Avenue and 63 Madison Avenue. The purchase price indicated that the buildings were worth a combined $1.15 billion.

During the 2020s, the public ground-floor spaces and the amenity areas were renovated for $20 million. The New York City Landmarks Preservation Commission designated the building's lobby as a landmark in November 2021. Although the lobby was not as well known as some of Warren and Wetmore's other designs, such as Grand Central Terminal, it had been preserved in nearly its original condition, except for the connection that had been created between the hotel and office lobbies. Fitness brand TMPL announced plans to open a gym on the basement and ground floor in 2023. George Comfort & Sons refinanced the building in 2026 with a $386 million loan. By that year, one-third of the space or 250,000 square feet (23,000 m^{2}) was occupied by Havas Health.

== See also ==
- List of New York City Designated Landmarks in Manhattan from 14th to 59th Streets
