= Palazzo Corner Valmarana =

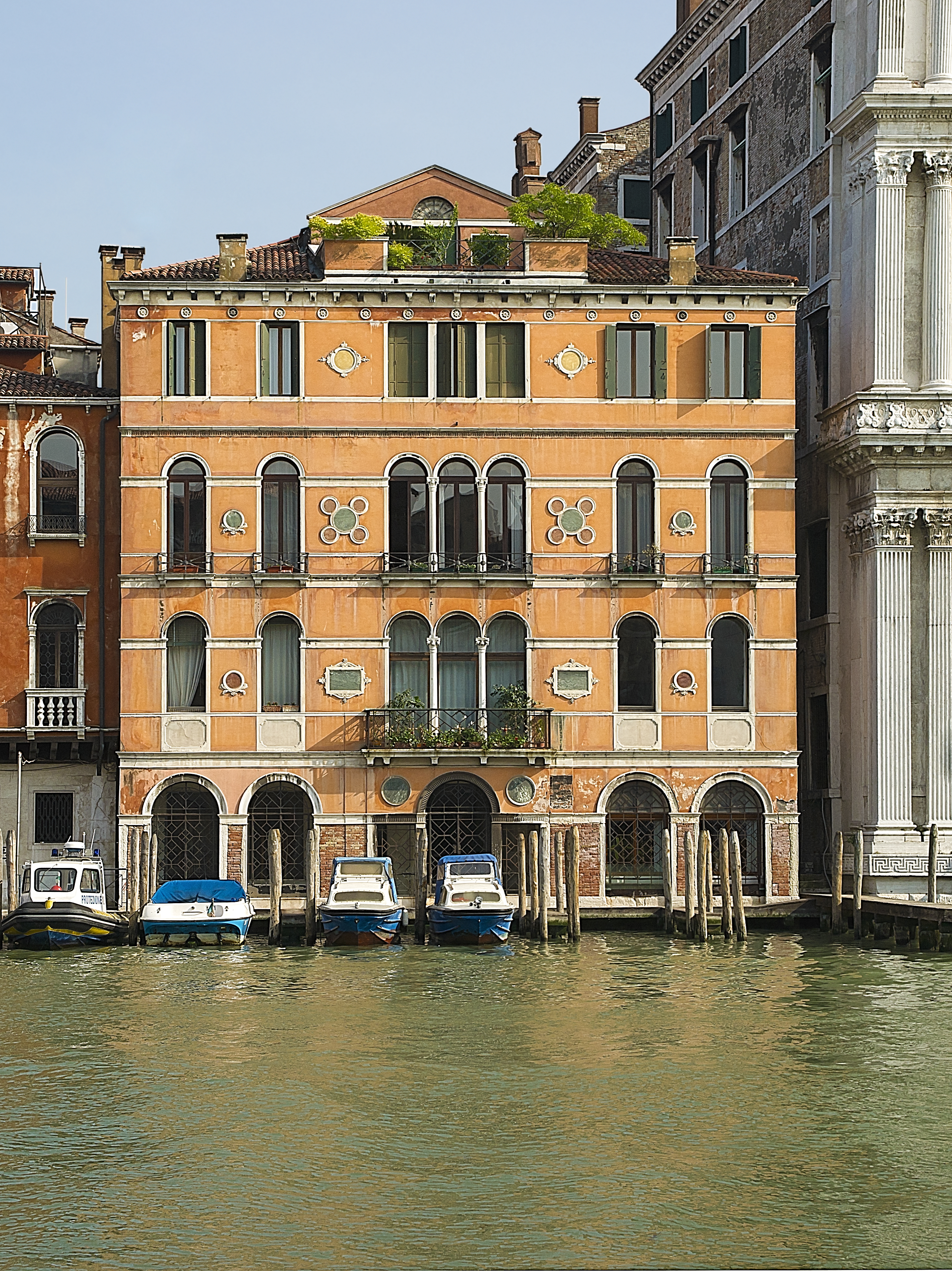
- Palazzo Corner Valmarana
- Interactive map of the Palazzo Corner Valmarana area

General information
- Type: Office
- Architectural style: Venetian Renaissance
- Location: San Marco district, Venice, Italy
- Coordinates: 45°26′12.39″N 12°19′58.16″E
- Construction started: 16th century

Technical details
- Floor count: 4 levels

Palazzo Corner Valmarana is a palace in Venice, located in the San Marco district and overlooking the Grand Canal. It locates not far from the Ponte di Rialto, between Palazzo Cavalli and Palazzo Grimani di San Luca.

== History ==
It is a 16th-century building, but completely renovated in the second half of the 19th century, with interventions that favored the chromatic and decorative aspects of architecture.

== Architecture ==
The façade is of four floors and overlooks the left bank of the Grand Canal, immediately before Palazzo Grimani di San Luca. Each of two noble floors features a trifora flanked by pairs of monoforas. The mezzanine attic has rectangular windows; all other openings are arched. The facade is pained bright orange and decorated with marble paterae, white string courses, and other moldings. The palace houses municipal offices.

== See also ==
- Palazzo Smith Mangilli Valmarana
- Valmarana family
