= 404 Fifth Avenue =

Commercial building in Manhattan, New York

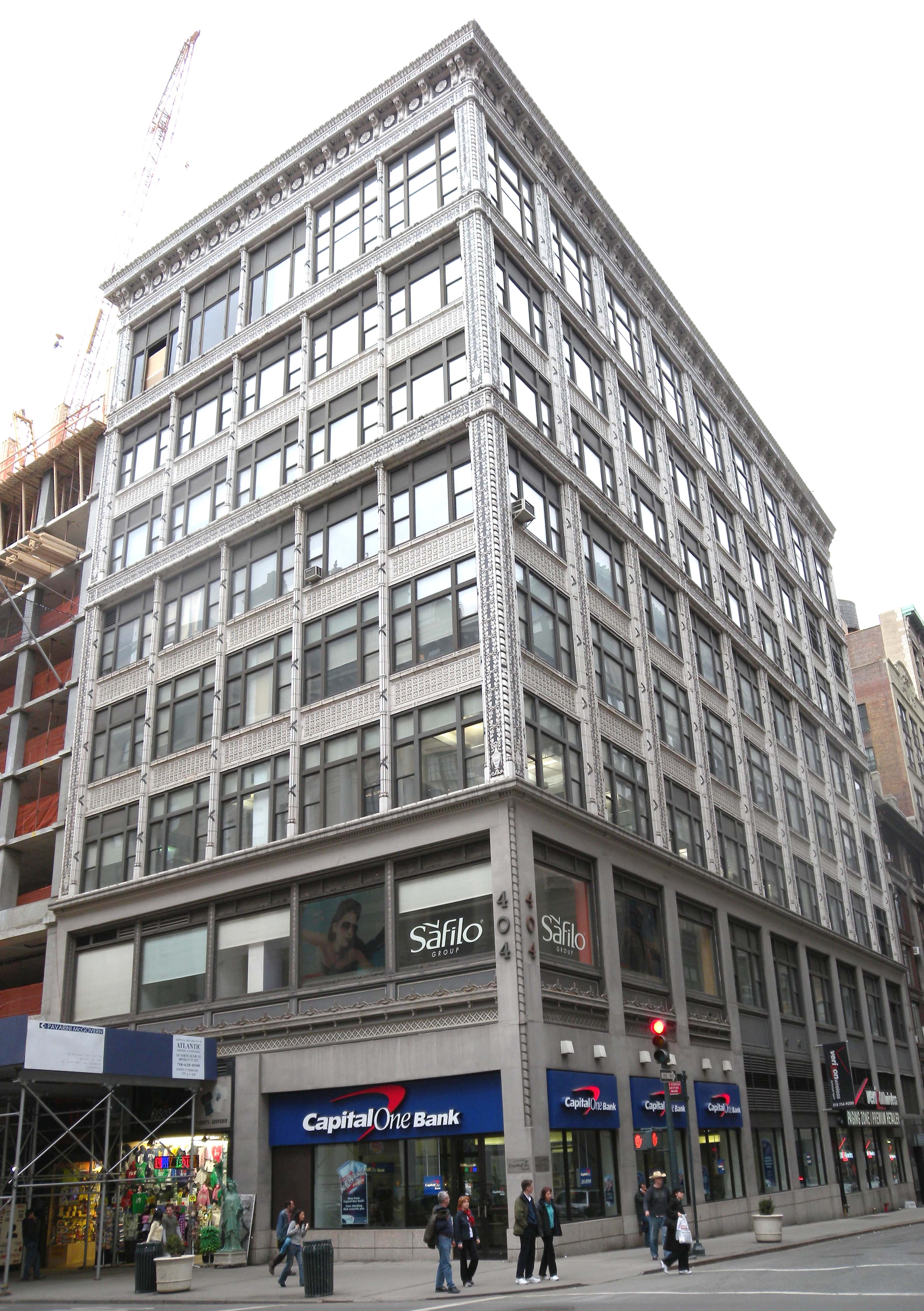
- Seen from across Fifth Avenue
- Interactive map of the 404 Fifth Avenue area
- Alternative names: Stewart & Company Building

General information
- Location: 404 Fifth Avenue
- Coordinates: 40.7504°N 73.9836°W
- Construction started: February 1914
- Completed: December 27, 1914

Technical details
- Floor count: 8

Design and construction
- Architect: Warren and Wetmore

Website
- winick.com/404-5th-avenue

New York City Landmark
- Designated: April 18, 2006
- Reference no.: 2185

404 Fifth Avenue, also known as the Stewart & Company Building, is a commercial building at Fifth Avenue and 37th Street in the Midtown Manhattan neighborhood of New York City, New York, United States. It was designed by Warren and Wetmore and built in 1914 for Robert Walton Goelet, a nephew of one of the architects. The building was named for the Stewart & Company, an existing tenant who leased one of the building's storefronts. The upper stories are clad with white and blue terracotta. It is a New York City designated landmark.

In February 1914, Goelet announced that he would develop an eight- to ten-story loft building at Fifth Avenue and 37th Street. The building was completed on December 28, 1914, for about $250,000. Initially, Mark Cross Co. leased the building from Goelet, and it subleased the upper stories to other tenants. Goelet continued to own the building until his death in 1941, upon which he bequeathed the building to his family. A variety of commercial tenants occupied the building through the 20th century. The building was resold multiple times in the 1960s and 1980s, and Prince Management bought the building in 1998. Joseph Chetrit bought the building in the early 21st century, relocating his office there.

== Site ==
404 Fifth Avenue, also known as 402 Fifth Avenue and the Stewart & Company Building, is in the South Midtown neighborhood of Manhattan in New York City, New York, United States. It occupies the southwestern corner of Fifth Avenue and 37th Street. The land lot is slightly "L"-shaped and covers 9,965 square feet (925.8 m^{2}), with a frontage of 65 feet 4 inches (19.91 m) on Fifth Avenue and 141 feet 6 inches (43.13 m) on 37th Street. Nearby buildings include The Langham, New York hotel and 390 Fifth Avenue to the south; the Lord & Taylor Building one block north; the Tiffany & Company Building to the east; and 200 Madison Avenue to the southeast.

404 Fifth Avenue was constructed on a site owned by Robert Walton Goelet, a member of a wealthy Dutch family that had founded the Chemical Bank. Robert Walton's father Robert and uncle Ogden had acquired the site in two parts. The first portion of the site was acquired from Montague M. Hendricks in 1886, while the second portion was acquired from Thomas Scott in 1891. At the time of the building's construction, the Goelets reportedly owned more land in New York City than any family except the Astors. Just before the current building was completed, the site had been occupied by three smaller commercial loft buildings. The structures had been built in 1889–1890 as hotels and boarding houses; two years later, McKim, Mead & White converted the structures into a banquet hall.

== Architecture ==
404 Fifth Avenue is eight stories tall and was designed by the firm of Warren and Wetmore. Whitney Warren, one of the firm's partners, was Robert Walton Goelet's maternal uncle. The building's architectural terracotta was manufactured by the New York Architectural Terra Cotta Company. In addition, Balcom and Darrow were the structural engineers, and the Harry E. Campbell Company made the ornamental iron. The structure was designed with elements of several architectural styles, including the late-19th-century Chicago school and the 18th-century British neoclassical styles. The columns on the lowest two stories were originally proposed to be made of black and white marble, while the upper stories were to use tinted black and white terracotta. The upper stories were ultimately clad with white and blue terracotta, an unusual color scheme typically found in pottery.

=== Facade ===
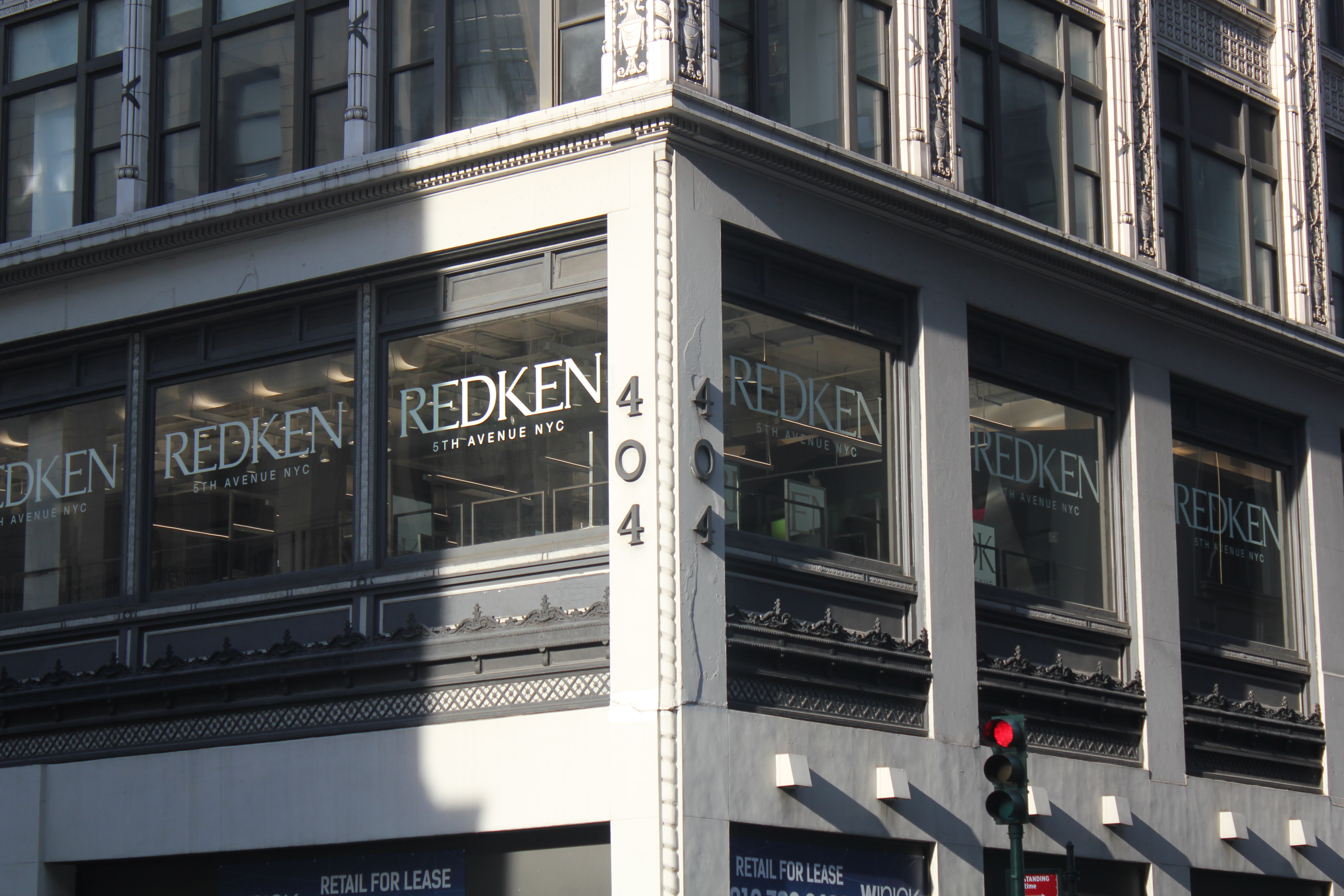
Lower-story facade detail

The Fifth Avenue elevation of the facade is divided into five bays, while the 37th Street elevation is divided into nine bays. At ground level, the Fifth Avenue elevation and the easternmost three elevations of the 37th Street elevation were used as storefronts. Originally, these storefronts contained glass-and-metal display windows, transom panels, stone bulkheads, and black marble cladding; these features were replaced in 1936. The modern-day storefronts on Fifth Avenue contain metal and glass display windows or doors. The six western bays had canopies and stone bulkheads, which were removed before 1940. The ground floor was originally clad in a dark black material, which was replaced with stucco at some point from 1940 to the 1970s. There is a tenants' entrance and a service entrance in the westernmost bay on 37th Street. There is a decorative horizontal band above the first story, which contains lozenge motifs with flowers inside them. On the second story, each bay originally contained single-pane windows; the western six bays on 37th Street have since been replaced with tripartite windows. Above the second floor is a cream-colored masonry cornice, above which the facade is ornately decorated with blue and white terracotta.

On the third through eighth floors, the Fifth Avenue and 37th Street elevations are designed in the same manner, with one window per floor on each bay. With a few exceptions, the windows are mostly composed of a central glass pane, casement windows on either side, and a transom window or metal transom panel above. Above the windows on the third, fourth, and sixth stories are spandrel panels with a grid of squares and flowers. There are horizontal bands above and below each spandrel, which are decorated with roundels, floral motifs, and rounded motifs. Above the fifth and seventh stories are horizontal string courses, which consist of white intertwined laurels and wreaths on a blue background; each string course contains ornate borders above and below it. Above the eighth story are brackets with acanthus-leaf motifs and flower designs, which alternate with blue panels that contain white laurels and ribbons. These brackets support a white terracotta cornice with various motifs.

Three of the building's corners face the street and are decorated with rope moldings at the first and second stories. The number "404" is placed on both elevations at the northeast corner. The bays on Fifth Avenue and 37th Street are divided by pilasters that run from the third to the eighth floors, interrupted by the string courses above the fifth and seventh floors. These pilasters are decorated with white egg-and-reed designs and are topped by acanthus-leaf capitals. The extreme ends of either facade contain piers that consist of white intertwined laurels and wreaths on a blue background, the same design as the string courses; there are urns at the bottom of each pier. There are rope motifs at each corner, which rise above rectangular bases at the second, fifth, and seventh floors.

The southern facade (now obscured by the Langham New York hotel) was clad with white brick and originally contained windows, many of which have been infilled. The facade contained the outline of two of the previous buildings at 400 Fifth Avenue. On the fifth through eighth stories, the easternmost eight bays had the same design as the rest of the facade, including a cornice above the eighth story. The rest of the south facade is topped by a white-and-blue band, and a mechanical penthouse is located above the southwestern corner of the roof. The west facade is also clad with white brick but is plain in design, without any cornices. The only ornamentation on this facade is a vertical white-and-blue band at the northwestern corner, as well as a horizontal band just below the roof.

=== Features ===
Originally, leather firm Mark Cross Company operated a store on the northern half of the ground floor, while department and mail-order firm Stewart & Company used the southern half of the ground level. Women's clothing store Emily Shops Inc. combined the two storefronts in 1936. During the late 20th century, the seventh and eighth floors contained a squash and racquet club with an aerobics club and two courts.

== History ==
Many stores established in the 1850s and 1860s were located along Broadway south of 14th Street. By the 1870s, stores were being established between 14th and 23rd Streets in the Ladies' Mile area. At the beginning of the 20th century, development was centered on Fifth Avenue north of 34th Street, where new department store buildings were quickly replacing the street's brownstones. One of the first new store buildings in the area was the B. Altman and Company Building, which opened in 1906. Other department stores such as Lord & Taylor, as well as specialty stores such as Tiffany & Co. and the Gorham Manufacturing Company, relocated during the 1900s and 1910s.

=== Early and mid-20th century ===
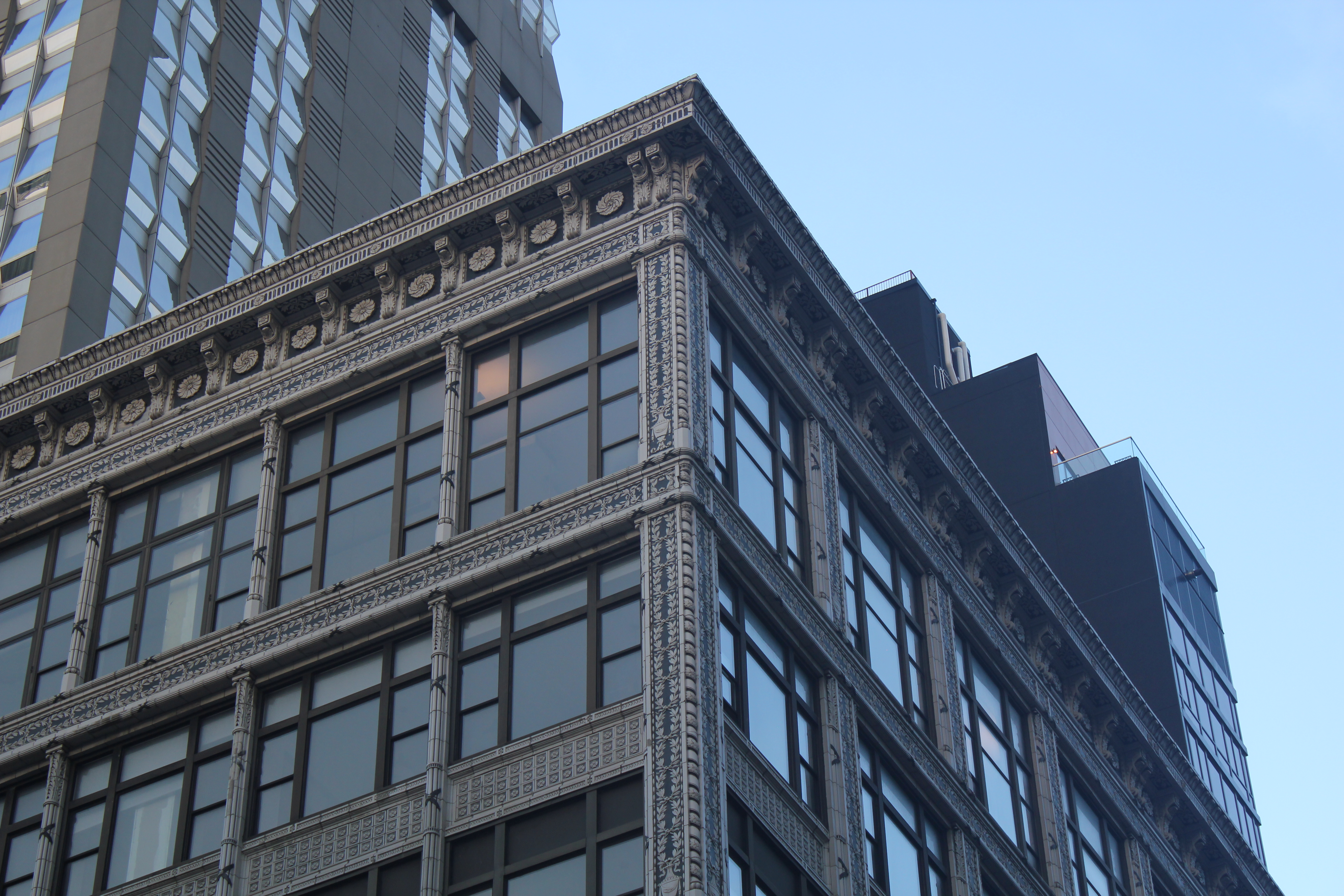
Upper-story facade detail

In February 1914, Robert Walton Goelet announced that he would develop an eight- to ten-story loft building at Fifth Avenue and 37th Street, giving the site's existing tenants 60 days to leave. Goelet then leased the corner storefront to the Mark Cross Company. Shortly afterward, Goelet hired Warren & Wetmore to design the structure, and the firm completed plans for an eight-story building in March. Stewart & Company, an existing tenant on the site, leased the southern storefront, as well as several floors of offices. Construction started on July 8, 1914; the structure was one of several store buildings constructed on the surrounding section of Fifth Avenue during the mid-1910s. The Mark Cross store in the building opened on October 19, 1914, relocating from 210 Fifth Avenue. Records show that the building was completed on December 28, 1914, for about $250,000. The site's value increased rapidly, from $1.17 million in 1914 to $1.61 million by 1915, after the building was completed.

Initially, Mark Cross Co. leased the building from Goelet, and it subleased the upper stories to other tenants. The upper stories were leased to various companies in the 1920s, including milliners Gage Brothers & Co., watchmaker Wittnauer, and embroidery company Stein-Doblin & Co. Stewart & Company merged with Arnold Constable & Company in 1925 but continued to operate a store there. Women's clothing store Emily Shops Inc. leased the basement, southern storefront, and second floor in January 1929, and Stewart and Company relocated out of the building in April 1929. (Note: Stewart & Co. moved to a store on Fifth Avenue and 56th Street in October 1929; it was also known as the Stewart Building. The 56th Street store went bankrupt in 1930 and was replaced with a Bonwit Teller store, which itself was razed to make way for Trump Tower.) Emily Shops expanded to the third floor that July, and 404 Fifth Avenue was known as the Mark Cross Building by the end of that year. The Mark Cross Co. store in the building closed in April 1936, when the company relocated further north. Emily Shops then leased the northern ground-level storefront and renovated the ground-story space. Emily Shops installed a green-and-white marble wall, with three large display windows on the ground story, and it rearranged some of its departments; the store reopened in September 1936.

By 1940, the building's tenants included a wool manufacturer, a jeweler, and an importer. Goelet continued to own the building until his death in 1941, upon which he bequeathed the building to his family. The Rhode Island Corporation, operated by the Goelet family, then took over the building. Emily Shops remained in the building until the mid-1950s. Other tenants during this 1940s and 1950s included jewelry manufacturer Swank, media company Condé Nast, publisher Ballantine Books, and real-estate firm Helmsley-Spear. According to the New York City Landmarks Preservation Commission (LPC), the building's tenants included merchants who sold products such as watches, clothing, jewelry, and rubber. Tenants came from such varied industries as banking, beauty care, dentistry, fitness, importing, legal, photography, publishing, and real estate. Laurel Books leased the storefront in the 1960s.

=== Late 20th century to present ===
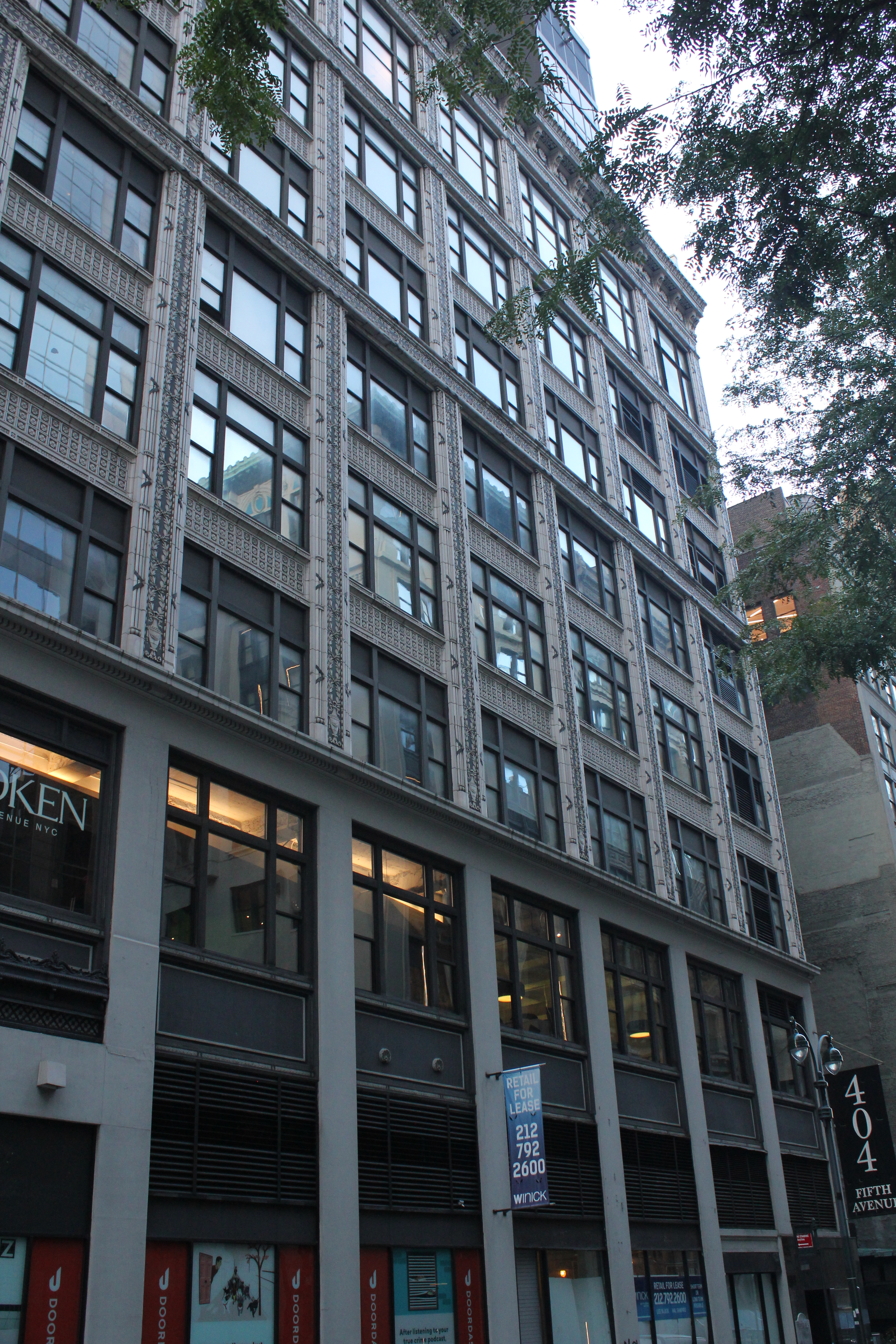
View down 37th Street

In May 1967, the Rhode Island Corporation sold the building to Lorraine Gallagher Freimann for an estimated $2 million; at the time, the building was subject to a $1,2 million mortgage. Larry Silverstein and Bernard H. Mendik bought the building from Freimann later the same year. Records indicate that Robert R. Zeiller acquired the deed to the building in April 1976. The building was transferred yet again to H & H Associates in 1979; that company owned the building for seven years. In the mid-1980s, the building's tenants included a squash and racquet club, as well as a jewelry showroom.

Murray Hill Properties acquired three adjacent structures at 396 to 400 Fifth Avenue in 1987, with plans to construct a 31-story or 35-story building on that site. Part of the skyscraper would have been cantilevered over the Stewart Building, which was owned by Manhattan Realty Acquisition Fund, a separate syndicate that also included Murray Hill Properties. Manhattan Realty Acquisition Fund sold the site's unused air rights to Tower Fifth Avenue, the limited partnership that owned 396–400 Fifth Avenue. Norman Sturner of Murray Hill Properties was considering renovating the Stewart Building's facade to harmonize with that of the new building, but he did not have a strong opinion on that matter. Nonetheless, he opposed a potential city-landmark designation for the Stewart Building, as that would give the LPC authority to prevent the adjacent skyscraper from being cantilevered over 404 Fifth Avenue.

In 1998, Prince Management and several other investors paid Murray Hill Properties $16 million for the building, a rate of $175 per square foot ($1,880/m^{2}). Prince Management already owned the sites at 398 and 400 Fifth Avenue and, in theory, could combine the three sites to erect a 250,000-square-foot (23,000 m^{2}) building. The LPC designated 404 Fifth Avenue and the nearby 2 Park Avenue as official city landmarks on April 18, 2006. Joseph Chetrit bought the building in the early 21st century, relocating his office there. Coworking space operator WeWork also occupied 404 Fifth Avenue until 2021. By early 2025, Blackstone Inc. claimed that the Chetrit family had defaulted on a $65 million loan that had been placed on 404 Fifth Avenue. The Chetrit family restructured the loan and ultimately retained ownership of the building, avoiding default.

== See also ==
- List of New York City Designated Landmarks in Manhattan from 14th to 59th Streets
