= Palazzo Grimani di San Luca =

Palace in Venice, Italy

Coordinates: 45°26′09.86″N 12°19′58.66″E

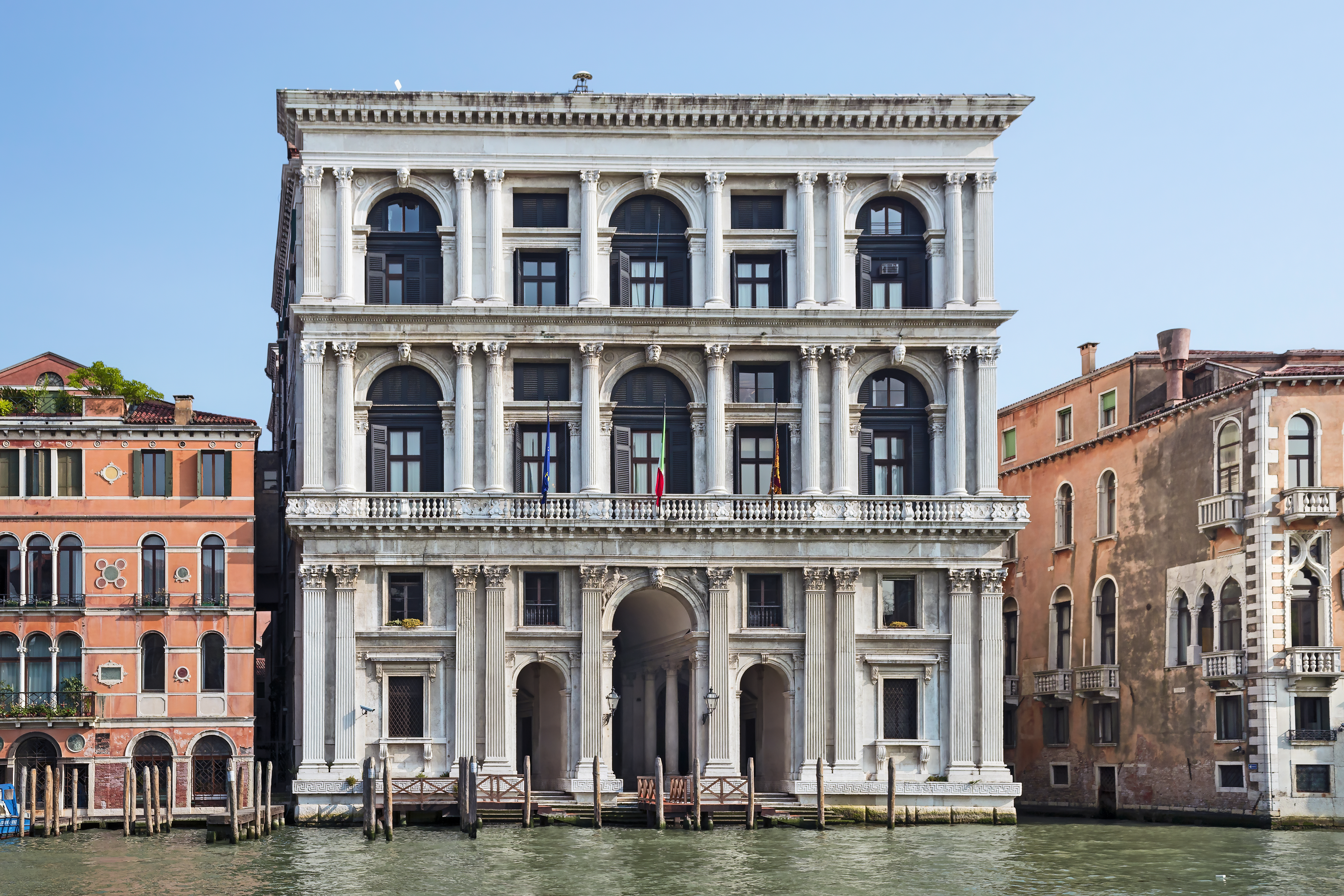
Facade on Grand Canal

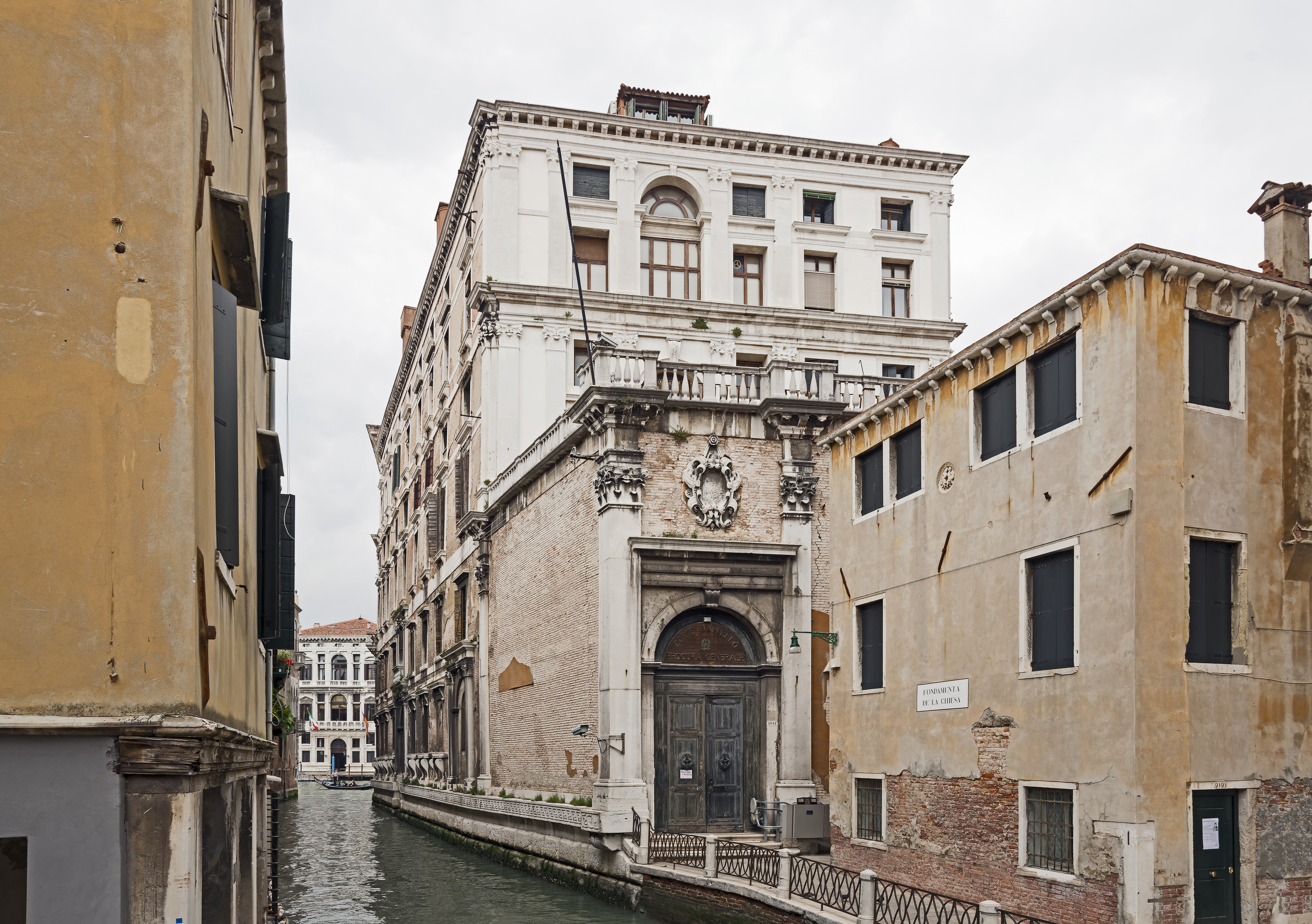
Facade on Rio de San Luca

The Palazzo Grimani di San Luca is a Renaissance-style palace, located between the Palazzo Corner Valmarana and the Rio di San Luca and the flanking Palazzo Corner Contarini dei Cavalli on the Grand Canal in the sestiere of San Marco of the city of Venice, Italy.

== History ==
The palace was built in the mid-16th century for procurator Gerolamo Grimani by architect Michele Sanmicheli, and completed after his death by Gian Giacomo de' Grigi, known as "il Bergamasco".

It has a classical plan with a central atrium. The facade has three sectors with Corinthian columns, suggestive of an Ancient Roman triumphal arch.

It was the residence of the patrician Grimani family until 1806. Palazzo Grimani is currently the seat of the Venice' Appeal Court.

The building was the inspiration for architect Stanford White of McKim, Mead & White, who, in the early 1900s, modelled his design for the Tiffany and Company Building at 401 5th Avenue in New York after it.

== Sources ==
- Russo, R. (1998). Palazzi di Venezia. Arsenale. ISBN 88-7743-185-7.
