= Tiffany and Company Building =

Commercial building in Manhattan, New York

- U.S. National Register of Historic Places
- U.S. National Historic Landmark
- New York State Register of Historic Places
- New York City Landmark
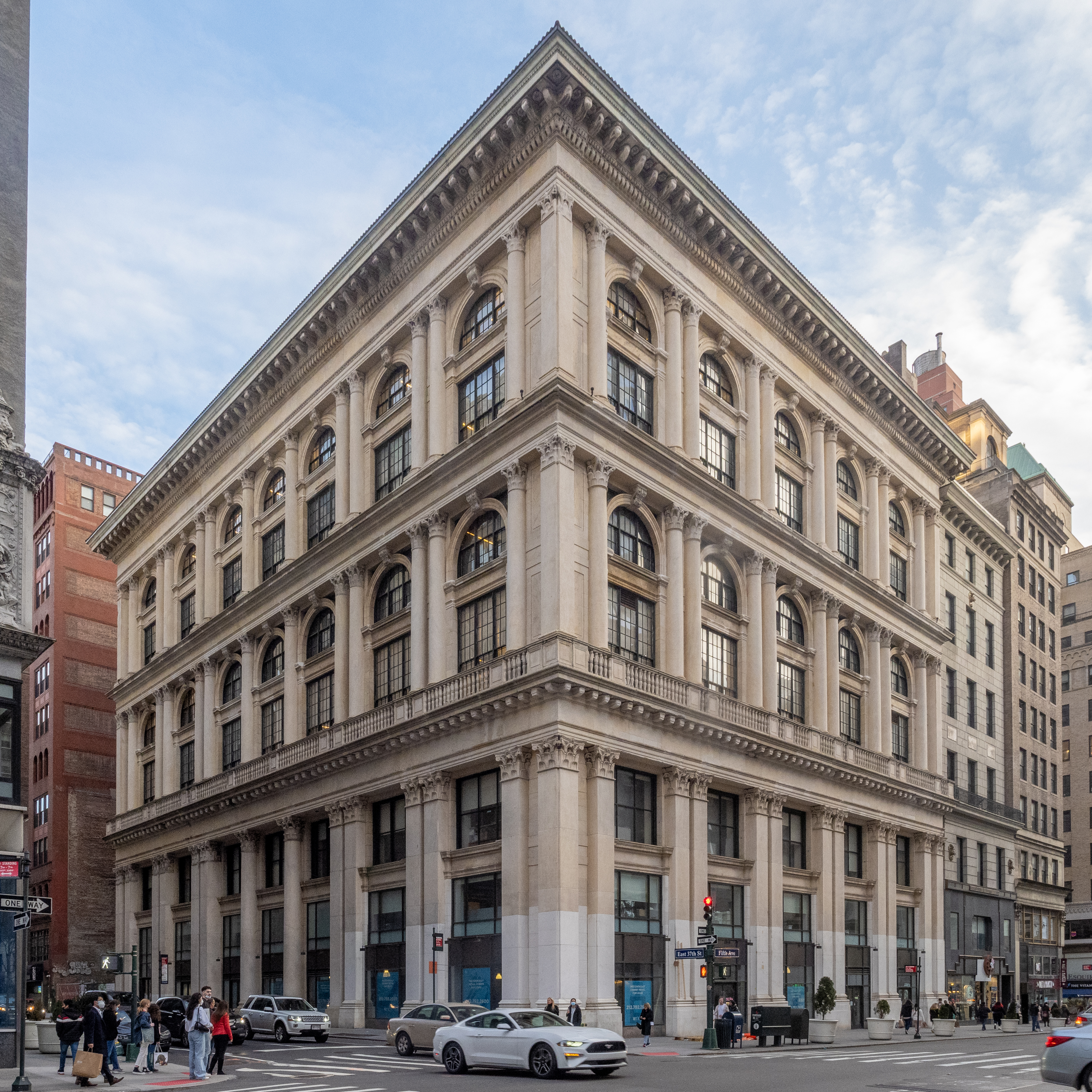
- Location: 401 Fifth Avenue, Manhattan, New York, U.S.
- Coordinates: 40°45′00″N 73°58′59″W
- Area: less than one acre
- Built: 1905
- Architect: Stanford White of McKim, Mead, and White
- Architectural style: Renaissance Revival
- NRHP reference No.: 78001886
- NYSRHP No.: 06101.001776
- NYCL No.: 1624

Significant dates
- Added to NRHP: June 2, 1978
- Designated NHL: June 2, 1978
- Designated NYSRHP: June 23, 1980
- Designated NYCL: February 16, 1988

The Tiffany and Company Building, also known as the Tiffany Building and 401 Fifth Avenue, is an eight-story commercial building at Fifth Avenue and 37th Street in the Midtown Manhattan neighborhood of New York City, New York, United States. The structure was designed in the Renaissance Revival style by Stanford White of McKim, Mead & White. It was built from 1903 to 1905 as the flagship store of jewelry company Tiffany & Co. The building is a New York City designated landmark and a National Historic Landmark.

The Tiffany Building has a marble facade inspired by that of the Palazzo Grimani di San Luca in Venice. The facade is divided by large entablatures and cornices into three horizontal tiers; the lowest tier has square piers and rectangular openings, while the second and third tiers have round columns and arched openings. The Tiffany Building has a steel superstructure and a sloped metal roof that resembles a tiled roof. The interior originally comprised seven above-ground stories and two basement levels; a mezzanine was added above the first story in 1952. The basement contained a vault, the first six stories contained various departments of the store, and the seventh story was an exhibition space. The interiors were decorated with various woods, marbles, and Guastavino tiles, much of which has since been removed.

Tiffany & Co.'s president Charles T. Cook developed the building, which cost $600,000 and opened on September 5, 1905. The Tiffany store prospered through the 1920s, but it suffered through the Great Depression. After the company moved to a new flagship store on 57th Street in 1940, the building was occupied by American Red Cross and Textron in the 1940s. Henry Goelet of the Goelet family acquired the building in 1951 and renovated the lower stories, while the upper stories were occupied by Allied Stores from 1950 to 1973. Sun Myung Moon of the Unification Church bought the Tiffany Building in 1977 and used it as a newspaper office. Following a failed plan in the late 1980s to build a tower above the Tiffany Building, the upper stories were used as television studios. The Stahl Real Estate Company bought the building in 2000 and renovated the lower stories.

== Site ==
The Tiffany and Company Building is at 401 Fifth Avenue in the Midtown Manhattan neighborhood of New York City, New York, United States. It is at the southeast corner with 37th Street. The building's land lot is nearly rectangular, with a recess at its southeast corner, and has a total area of 17,048 ft^{2} (1,583.8 m^{2}). (Note: Olmsted 1905, p. 119, gave a conflicting area of 17,784 ft^{2} (1,652.2 m^{2}).) It measures 117 ft (36 m) from north to south and 152 ft (46 m) from west to east. Nearby buildings include The Langham, New York hotel and 404 Fifth Avenue to the west; the Lord & Taylor Building one block north; the Morgan Library & Museum and Joseph Raphael De Lamar House one block east; 200 Madison Avenue to the southeast; and the Gorham Building at 390 Fifth Avenue to the southwest.

The residential core of Manhattan relocated north from lower Manhattan during the late 19th century. At the beginning of the 20th century, development was centered on Fifth Avenue north of 34th Street, where new department store buildings were quickly replacing the street's brownstones. One of the first new store buildings in the area was the B. Altman and Company Building, which opened in 1906. Other department stores such as Lord & Taylor, as well as specialty stores such as Tiffany & Co. and the Gorham Manufacturing Company, relocated during the 1900s and 1910s.

== Architecture ==
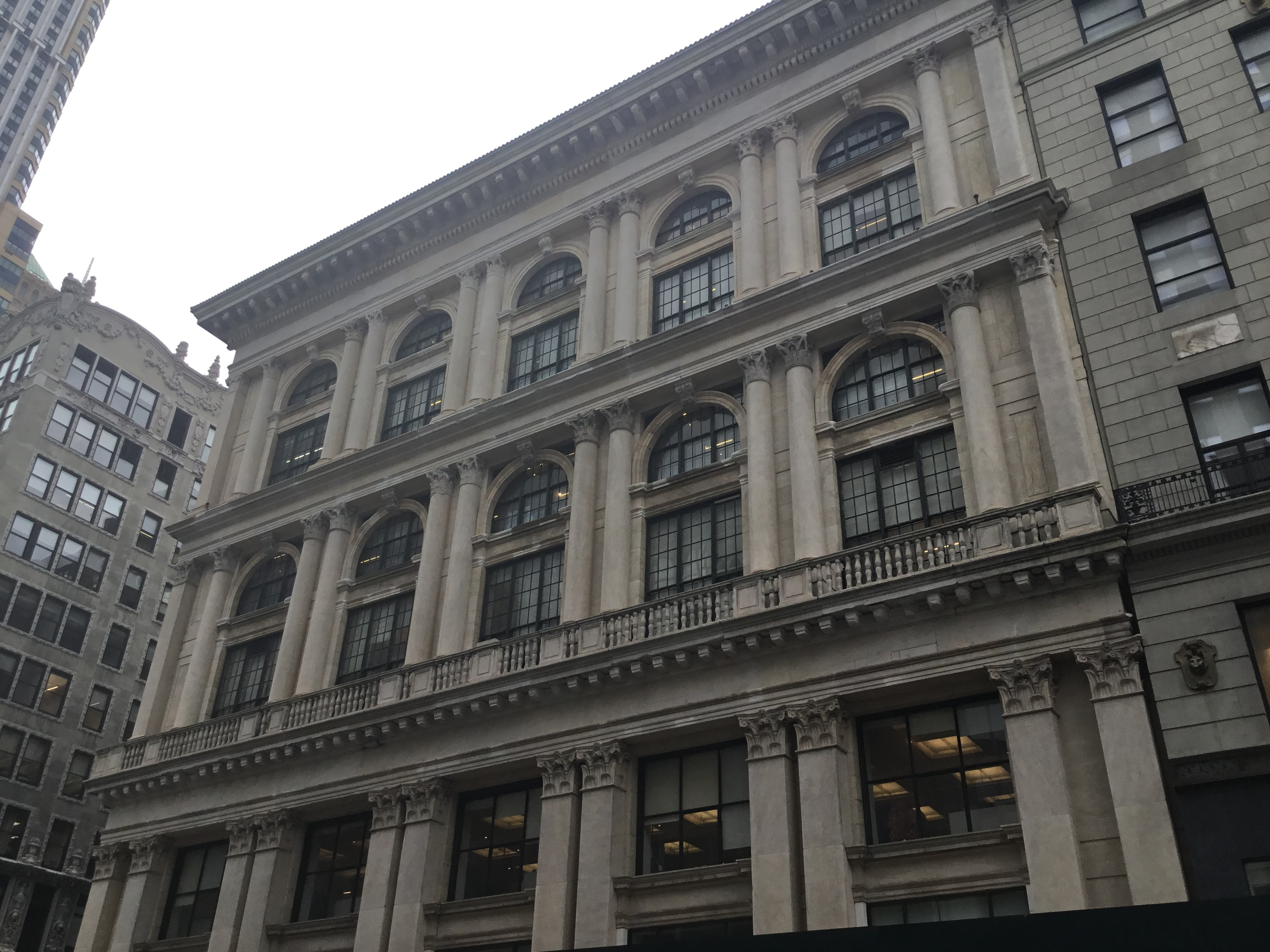
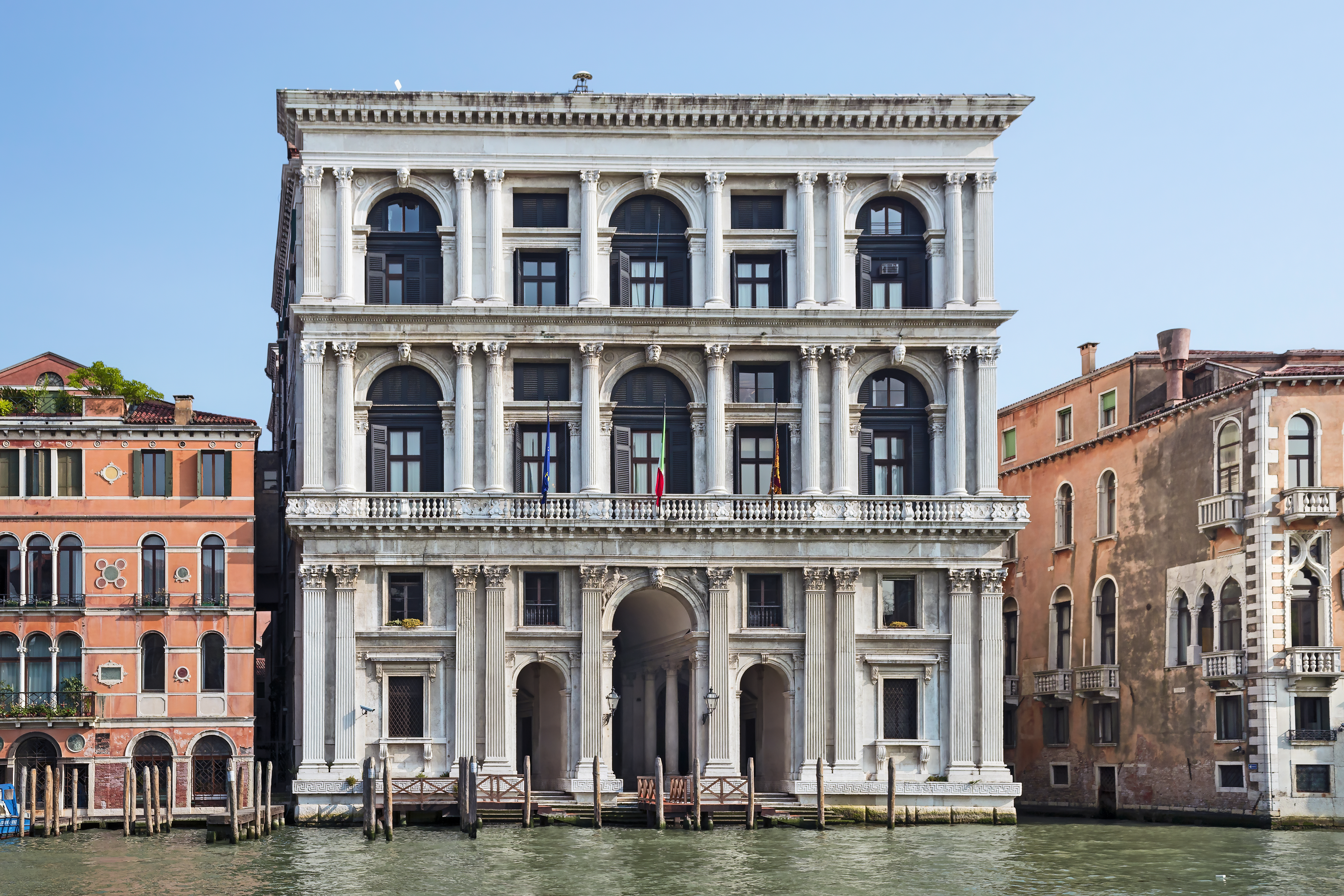
The Tiffany and Company Building's facade (left) is inspired by that of the Palazzo Grimani di San Luca (right).

The Tiffany and Company Building was designed by Stanford White of McKim, Mead & White for luxury retail store Tiffany & Co. It is the company's fifth flagship store in New York City. The facade is an adaptation of the Palazzo Grimani di San Luca in Venice. The building was originally seven stories tall, though its facade is divided into three horizontal tiers. The top of the roof is 140 ft (43 m) above ground; the high ceilings made the building about as tall as a typical 11-story structure. The facade remains intact, but the interior layout has been changed significantly. The addition of one story in the lowest tier makes the building now eight stories tall.

=== Facade ===
The facade is made largely of marble with finishes of iron and terracotta. It is divided vertically into five bays on its western elevation, facing Fifth Avenue, and seven bays on its northern elevation, facing 37th Street. Originally, the facade used clear wire glass for fireproofing, which was imperceptible from both the inside and the outside.

==== First tier ====
The bays of the lowest tier are mainly articulated by pairs of square Corinthian piers made of marble. Most bays are separated by two square piers, which rise from a single marble pedestal. These support an entablature and balustrade above the second floor. Between these piers, each bay has a square-headed opening. These piers originally were topped by Corinthian capitals, which were removed in 1952.

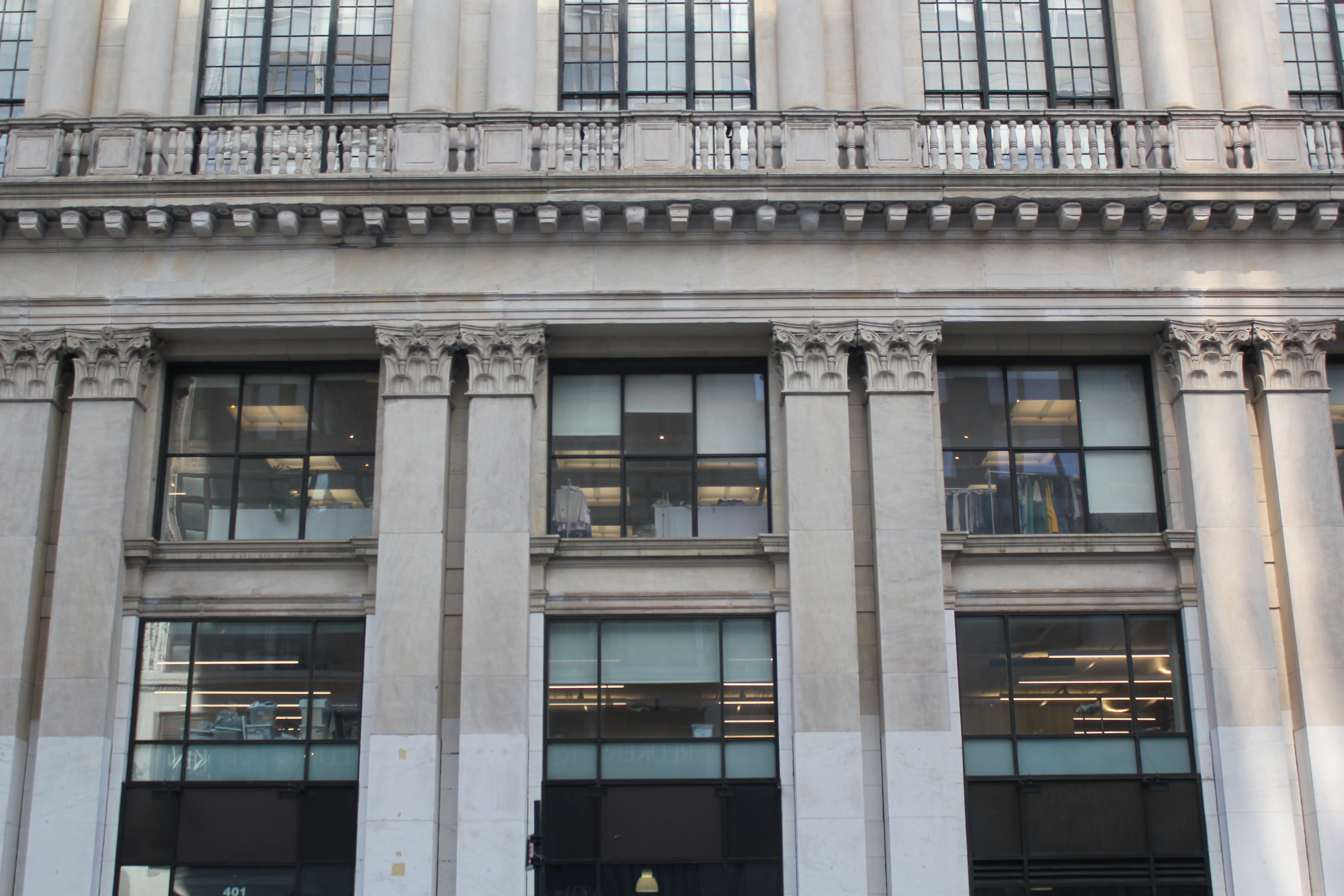
Facade of the lowest tier on Fifth Avenue, showing square piers. The first story, which is lighter in color, was modified in 1952 and restored in 2002.

On Fifth Avenue, the outermost bays provided an entrance to the Tiffany & Co. store. Each of these outermost bays contained brass porticos with revolving doors. The three inner bays on Fifth Avenue contained plate-glass storefront windows at the first story. Each first-story opening was topped by a marble spandrel, as well as a tripartite second-story window with six panes. Because the site slopes slightly downward to the south, there was a level platform in front of the Fifth Avenue elevation, which was two to four steps above the ground. In 1952, the storefronts, porticos, and spandrels on the first story were removed. In addition, the first story (which was originally slightly above the sidewalk) was lowered to ground level. Several storefronts, with black-granite piers and spandrels, were installed in their place. The black granite was removed in 2002 and the original design of the ground story was restored, with new square piers and bronze storefronts. The pilasters at the ground story are lighter in color than those above.

On 37th Street, the third and fourth bays from west contained porticos similar to those on Fifth Avenue, while the remaining bays contained storefronts. The second story was designed with similar windows and spandrels as on Fifth Avenue. The center three bays are separated by single rounded columns. The rest of the bays are separated by pairs of square piers, similar to those on Fifth Avenue. The two westernmost bays were modified in 1952 to resemble the storefronts on Fifth Avenue. The third through sixth bays from west remain intact, except for the addition of black-granite spandrels at the mezzanine level. The seventh bay from west (the easternmost bay on that elevation) was retrofitted with a black-granite entrance, removed in 2002.

==== Second and third tiers ====
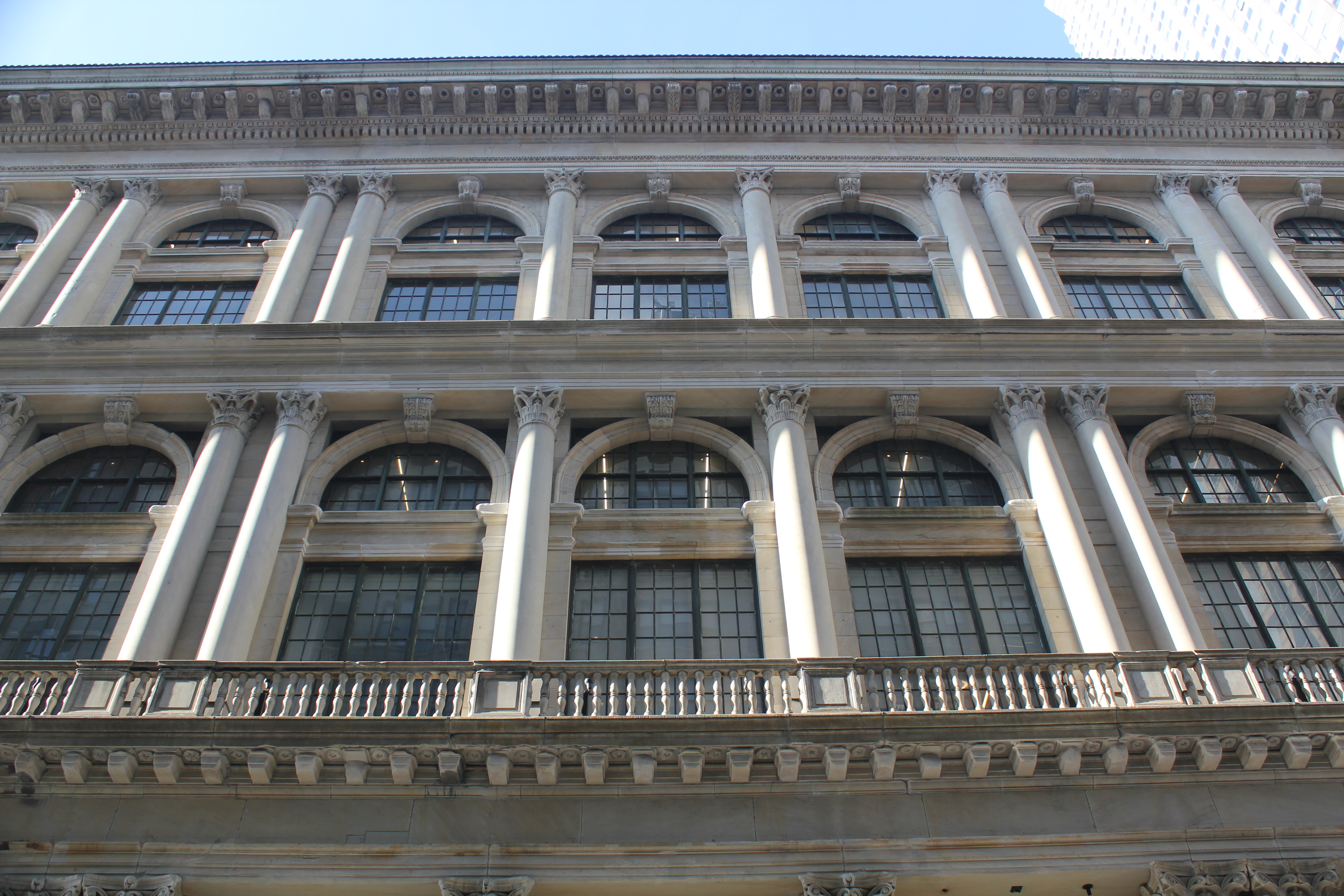
Two upper tiers

The second and third tiers are designed similarly with only minor differences. On both tiers, the windows are designed as double-height arches. The bays are separated by rounded Corinthian-style engaged columns, which are generally grouped in pairs (except the center three bays on 37th Street, which are separated by single columns). The second tier consists of the third and fourth stories. The third story contains rectangular double-hung windows, each divided into several panes. The windows at the third and fourth stories are separated by stone spandrel panels. The columns contain imposts at that level; these imposts support round arches that rise to keystones at the top of the fourth story. The spandrels above the corners of these arches are exposed, allowing the installation of rectangular windows on the fourth story. The exposed spandrels increased the amount of glass used in the windows behind them.

Above the fourth floor, at the central bay on 37th Street, was a statue of the mythological figure Atlas, designed by Henry Frederick Metzler. This statue had been placed on Tiffany & Co.'s previous headquarters and has been at 6 East 57th Street since 1940. The statue stood as an icon of the brand; the flagship store did not have the name "Tiffany" appear on its facades, and only the statue and clock denoted the company's occupancy. The statue was of a bearded, thin man and was sculpted from wood of a fir tree, painted to resemble the patina of weathered bronze. The feet were made of solid lead. Aside from the Atlas statue, White intentionally did not put any sculpture on the facade.

An entablature separated the fourth floor (top of the second tier) and fifth floor (bottom of the third tier). The fifth and sixth stories are designed almost identically to the third and fourth stories, respectively. The main difference is that the engaged piers are covered with panels, and the spandrels of the arches are covered. The facade is topped by an entablature and a cornice with large modillions. Above the cornice, the seventh story is placed within a pitched roof, which due to its location is not easily visible from the street. The roof appeared to be a tile roof, but it was actually a fireproof metal surface fabricated by the Meurer Brothers.

=== Structural and mechanical features ===
The interior was divided into seven above-ground stories and two basement levels. The current first story was rebuilt at a lower height in 1952 to allow the installation of a mezzanine above it. The sub-basement is 25 ft (7.6 m) below the sidewalk. The floor slabs are about 2 ft (0.61 m) thick and the exterior walls are up to 5 to 6 ft (1.5 to 1.8 m) thick, much larger than in similar buildings. The building also used a steel superstructure, which allowed the use of thinner exterior walls, thereby permitting large glass windows at the first story and exposed spandrels on the fourth story. High ceilings and glazed windows allowed natural light to illuminate almost all of the selling spaces on the first to sixth floors.

As a fireproofing measure, the Tiffany store minimized the use of wood. In addition, all doors were made of steel and all windows were made of wire-glass with steel frames. Terracotta and clay were also used for fireproofing. The ceilings of the basement and top floor were both made of Guastavino tiles, manufactured by the National Fire Proofing Company. Also included within the building were glass partitions made by the Pittsburgh Plate Glass Company in a manner resembling marble. All the interior windows, facing adjacent buildings on the same block, are made of wire glass.

Six elevators originally served the building's upper floors. The elevators were steel cages and were in the rear (eastern) part of the store. In 1952, two of the elevators were removed while the other four elevators were rebuilt. In addition to those, a lift allowed patrons to bring their valuables down to the basement vault. There was a private elevator for customers who had valuables in the vault. Wrapping around the elevator cabs was the main stairway, which was decorated with exedra and mythical creatures. The risers of the stairway were 8 ft (2.4 m) wide and were made of Formosa marble. The entire building was fitted with a pneumatic tube system. The basement contained three small generators and an ice machine; to prevent vibrations, the foundation of the basement was encased in a 1 ft-thick (0.30 m) layer of sand. Each floor had eight ventilation fans.

=== Interior ===
==== Basement ====
The basement contained a safe deposit vault and a valuables-storage department. The vault's ceiling was made of masonry. Its walls were 4 ft (1.2 m) thick and included steel plates measuring 22 in (560 mm) thick. The two vault doors were secured to the vault's steel frame by heavy bolts. The outer vault door was 14 in (360 mm) thick and was unlocked by three dials made of white enamel. The inner door was 8 in (200 mm) thick and was operated using a lever. Architects' and Builders' Magazine wrote that explosives or drills could not penetrate the vault. Inside were 2,036 safe-deposit boxes, each of which was secured by a double combination lock. The vault was so closely guarded that, when the vault experienced a minor fire in 1914, the store's security guards initially refused to let New York City Fire Department firefighters in. The safe remained in place even after Tiffany & Co. relocated in 1940.

The vault was accessed by a marble hallway with decorative gates at one end. There was also a safe-keeping department with Guastavino-tiled ceilings and marble walls. The coupon room was surrounded by white-glass walls. On the 37th Street side was the shipping department. Packages would be loaded in the basement, where they were then lifted to a vestibule at street level and loaded onto trucks.

==== First story ====
The original first story contained gray decoration. The space had purplish-gray German marble columns. which were cast in four pieces and hollowed out, surrounding the steel superstructure. The floor surface was made of Philippine teak. On this story were Philippine teak display boxes, as well as selling counters decorated with griffin-shaped legs. Some wall surfaces were made of Formosa marble. Other walls and counters had teakwood with brass-and-steel borders. The first story originally contained ten tons of bronze fixtures, which were removed from the store in a 1952 renovation. Behind the elevators was an exhibit room trimmed in ash, which contained a brass coffered ceiling. The double-height ceiling was extensively coffered, and silvered chandeliers were hung from the coffers. In 1952, a mezzanine level was created within the upper half of the original space, and the original first story was slightly lowered.

==== Upper stories ====
The front of the second floor, facing Fifth Avenue, was used for selling Tiffany glass, statuary, and bronze merchandise. There were Ionic columns within this space. The rear of the second floor contained the president's and board of directors' offices, which were decorated with wood. The second floor also contained the counting rooms, correspondence, and mail order departments. Tableware, pottery, and glass were sold on the third floor, and the registry offices and the order department were also on that story. The fourth floor contained the photography, engraving, design, heraldic, and library departments. Goldsmiths, polishers, and diamond cutters worked on the fifth floor, while the sixth floor sold leather goods and clocks. Two of the upper floors contained wooden-tiled floor surfaces laid in a herringbone pattern.

The seventh floor, at the top of the building, was not in the original plans. It was only added after McKim, Mead & White realized that there was enough space beneath the metal roof. The top floor was used for exhibitions. (Note: Lowe 1992, p. 278, says the seventh story was used for storage.) It measured about 60 by 100 ft (18 by 30 m) in total. The center of the ceiling had an oval glass skylight measuring 20 by 60 ft (6.1 by 18.3 m). The vaulted ceiling was 35 ft (11 m) high and was covered with Guastavino tiles. Though one account described the ceiling as being supported by Corinthian columns, The New York Times cited a press release as saying that the space was "a column-free expanse". Architect Robert A. M. Stern described the top floor as "an elegant and spartan antidote to the opulence of the main hall at street level". Only the decorations on the top floor remain intact, except the skylight, which has been removed.

== History ==
Charles Lewis Tiffany and John B. Young founded the stationery store Tiffany, Young and Ellis in 1837; the store was housed at 259 Broadway in Lower Manhattan. The company began selling jewelry, glassware, and clocks in 1839, and these items comprised most of the firm's sales four years later. This prompted the firm to expand to a neighboring building. The name was shortened to Tiffany & Company in 1853, when Charles Tiffany took control and established the firm's emphasis on jewelry. Tiffany & Co. moved to 271 Broadway in 1847 and then to 550 Broadway in 1854. (Note: Landmarks Preservation Commission 1988, p. 2 gives a conflicting date of 1851 for the relocation to 271 Broadway.) The Atlas clock was sculpted with the construction of 550 Broadway. By the American Civil War, Tiffany & Co. was one of the nation's leading jewelry makers. With the uptown movement of commerce, Tiffany & Co. built a headquarters at 15 Union Square West in 1870. As late as 1893, Charles Tiffany denied rumors that the company would move yet again to Fifth Avenue and 34th Street, even as other companies were doing so.

=== Tiffany use ===
==== Development ====
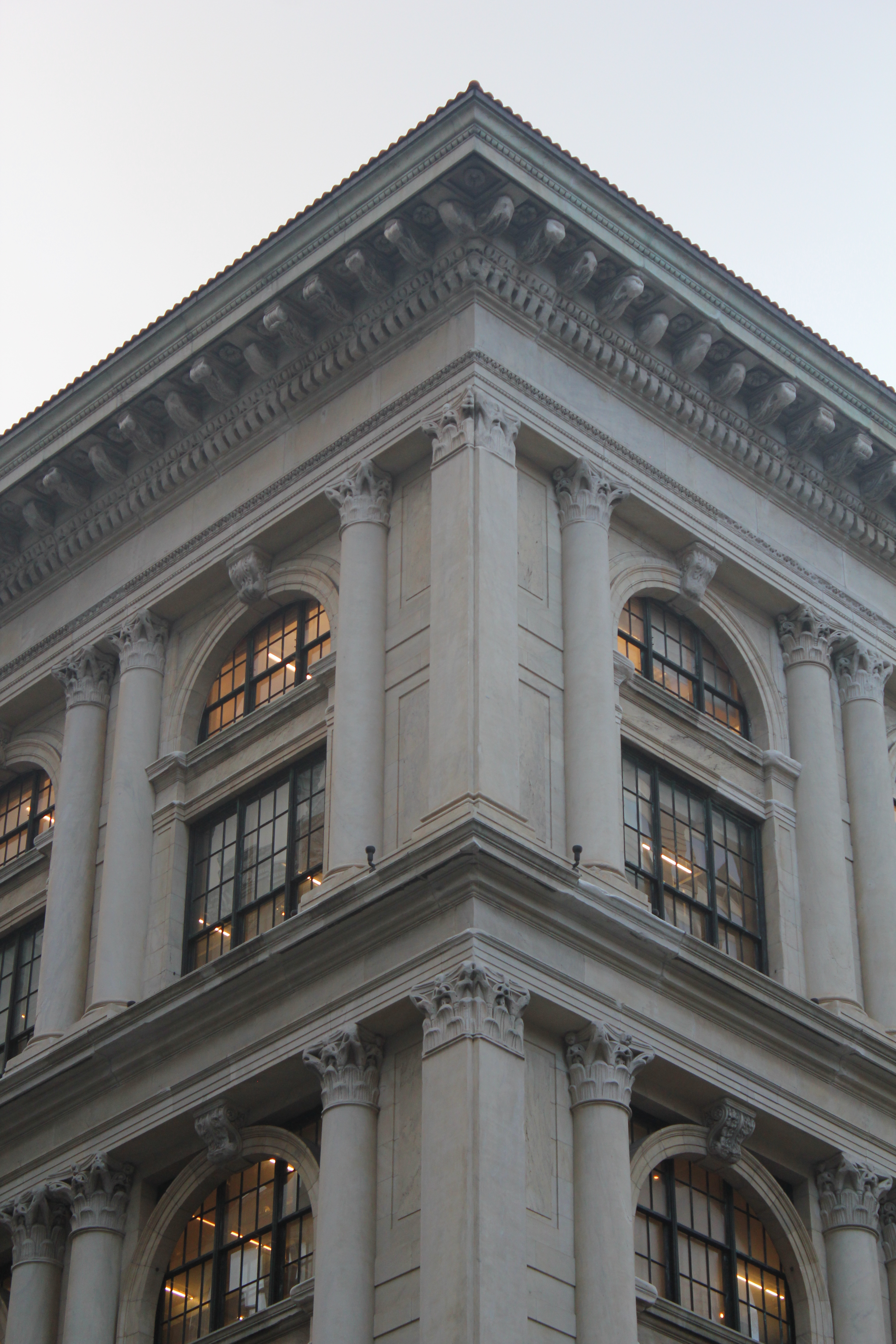
Upper floors

Charles Tiffany was again planning to relocate the headquarters of Tiffany & Co. by 1902, but he died that year, before the company could relocate. Tiffany's successor as company president, Charles T. Cook, bought a site at Fifth Avenue and 37th Street from George C. Boldt in April 1903. The site cost $2 million and measured 159 ft (48 m) on Fifth Avenue by 151 ft (46 m) on 37th Street. At the time, this was the most anyone had ever paid for a commercial site in Manhattan. Cook planned to build a new headquarters on the site, hiring McKim, Mead & White to "build me a palace". McKim, Mead & White filed plans for a seven-story store with the New York City Bureau of Buildings in September 1903. The building was to measure 117 by 152 feet and was to contain a marble facade with cornices, three Atlas statues, and two entrances. The next month, the Charles T. Wills Company was hired as the building's general contractor. As the site was being excavated that October, the foundation walls collapsed, killing one laborer.

The building's cornerstone was laid on March 16, 1904. That month, city inspectors alleged that the Tiffany Building's contractors were violating construction codes by hastily erecting steel frames in the winters and then installing the brick-arched floors in the summers. At the time, New York City law mandated that the top of a development site's steel structure could not progress more than three stories beyond the highest brick-arched floor. The southern lot line, which abutted the home of Henry O. Havemeyer, was originally irregular in shape; this created a situation in which parts of one lot were surrounded on three sides by the other lot. In August 1904, Havemeyer and Tiffany & Co. swapped two of the interior lots to straighten out the boundary of the site. The building ultimately cost $600,000 to complete, excluding the cost of the land. The firm also designed a garage at 141 East 41st Street for Tiffany & Co.

==== Operation ====
The new Tiffany Building opened on September 5, 1905. At the time, the seventh floor was not complete. Within the first three minutes of the new store's opening, a customer had bought $9,575 worth of merchandise. The store's merchandise at the time ranged from $2,000 garters to $700,000 necklaces. In February 1908, the city government ordered that buildings on Fifth Avenue between 26th and 47th Streets had to remove stoops and vaults that encroached onto the street, as the city planned to widen Fifth Avenue. That December, McKim, Mead & White filed plans to remove the marble steps in front of the building. Three months later, the firm filed plans for a seven-story building to the south, later the Gunther Building. Although that site was owned by Tiffany & Co., the Tiffany store did not occupy that land lot.

Tiffany & Co. had been one of the earliest stores to move uptown to Fifth Avenue, which at the time was still primarily residential. In 1910, the New-York Tribune reported that the Altman and Tiffany buildings had prompted high demand "of high-class retail houses for locations on the avenue". Tiffany & Co. temporarily switched to making surgical instruments for the government during World War I. After the war, the company reverted to producing luxury items. The Tiffany store prospered through the 1920s, but it suffered through the Great Depression, recording net losses for the first time in its history. Nonetheless, the corner of 37th Street and Fifth Avenue "stood as the symbol of wealth in the richest shopping area in the country, if not in the world", according to The New York Times.

By the late 1930s, commerce on Fifth Avenue had relocated still further uptown to 57th Street. In May 1939, the company leased a site on 57th Street from First National City Bank, which acted as trustee for the William Waldorf Astor estate, the previous owner of the property. In exchange, National City Bank agreed to take over the 37th Street building. Tiffany & Co. then hired Cross & Cross to design a new flagship store at 6 East 57th Street. The new flagship store opened on October 21, 1940. The same day, Tiffany & Co. deeded the 37th Street site to the Astor estate, with National City Bank paying $1.2 million. The interior of the old store was disassembled immediately after the Astors acquired the building.

=== 1940s to mid-1970s ===
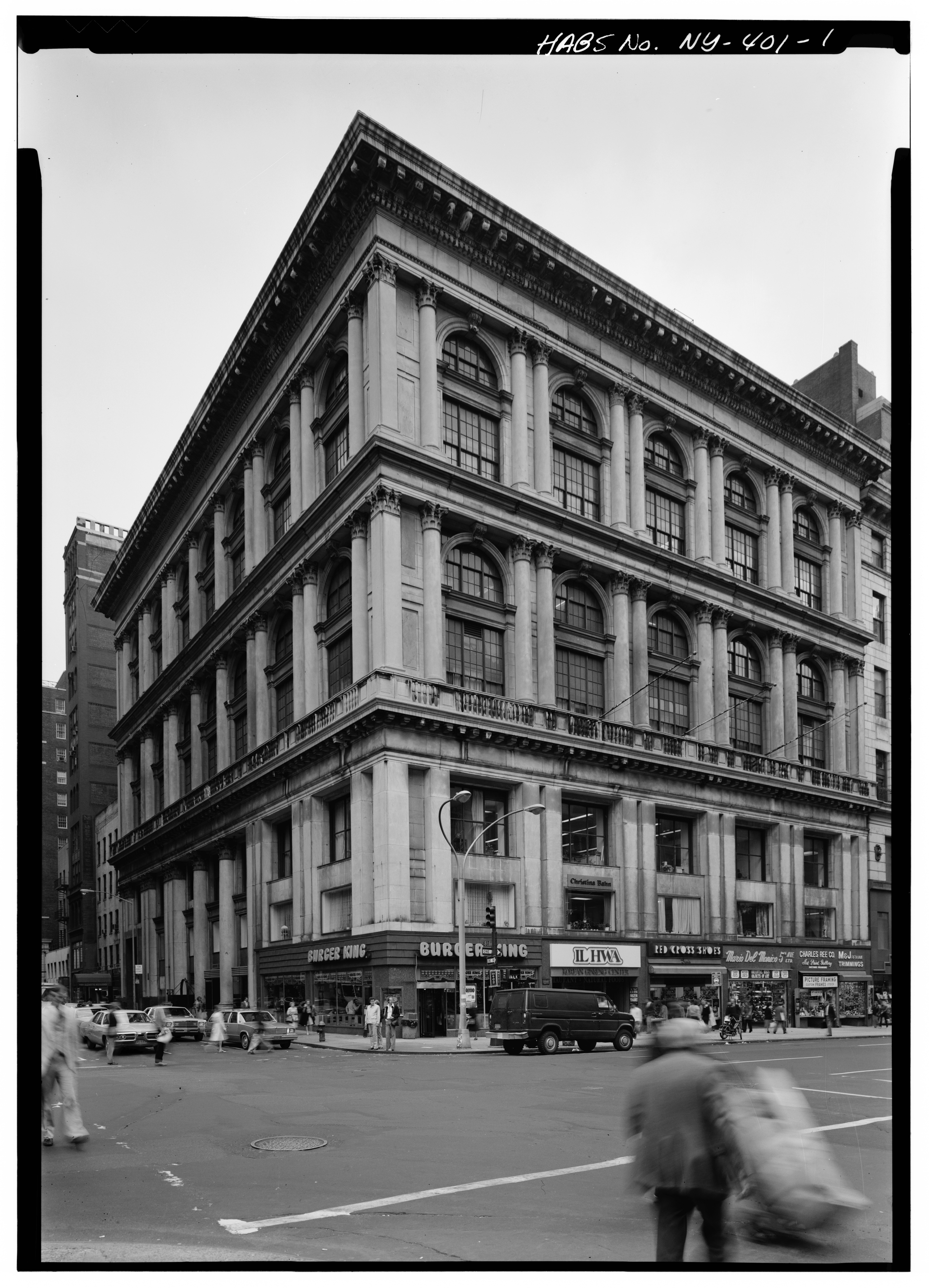
Seen in the 1970s

For three years in the early 1940s, the ground floor was leased to the American Red Cross, which hosted events such as home-nursing courses as well as volunteer art exhibitions. In 1945, Alad Holding Inc., led by Alan N. Adelson, leased the building for $2 million and then sold the leasehold to industrial company Textron. Textron then remodeled the first to third floors and, in the interim, opened an office on the seventh floor in April 1946. Textron planned to eventually occupy the entire building and rename it. The company also added an air conditioning system. In July 1949, Textron announced plans to move its men's division to the Empire State Building while keeping the women's division at 401 Fifth Avenue. That November, Textron sold the leasehold, which was then acquired by Charles A. Frueaoff. Allied Stores leased the third through sixth stories of the Tiffany Building in 1950, and the Office of Price Stabilization also briefly occupied the building until early 1952.

Henry Goelet of the Goelet real-estate family obtained full ownership of the Tiffany Building in January 1951 in a series of transactions worth $8.5 million. He bought the leasehold from the Frueaoff estate, as well as the fee interest in the land, from the Astor estate, obtaining $1.5 million in short-term financing. Goelet had planned to lease the lowest stories to a "Midwestern department store", but this deal was canceled after the U.S. federal government demanded that the Office of Price Stabilization use the space. In 1952, Goelet detailed his plans to renovate the building. He planned to lower the first story slightly, add a mezzanine above it, remodel the storefronts, and add new air conditioning and elevators. Charles N. and Selig Whinston conducted the renovations, which cost $1 million. Ten tons of bronze and $1 million of marble were removed during the project.

The Gotham Hosiery Company leased the new mezzanine level in 1953, and American Bleached Goods opened a second-story office with two showrooms the same year. Other tenants in the 1950s included shoe chain Stuart Brooks Red Cross Shoes, as well as a Horn & Hardart restaurant. Goelet sold the Tiffany & Co. Building in 1957 to a syndicate of Nelson Properties Inc. and Burnebrook Manor Inc. Allied renovated the fifth to seventh floors in 1960, consolidating its marketing department there. Allied continued to occupy the Tiffany Building until 1973, when it moved to 1120 Avenue of the Americas. The surrounding stretch of Fifth Avenue had begun to decline by the 1970s. A Burger King fast-food restaurant had opened within the Tiffany Building by 1976.

=== Late 1970s to present ===
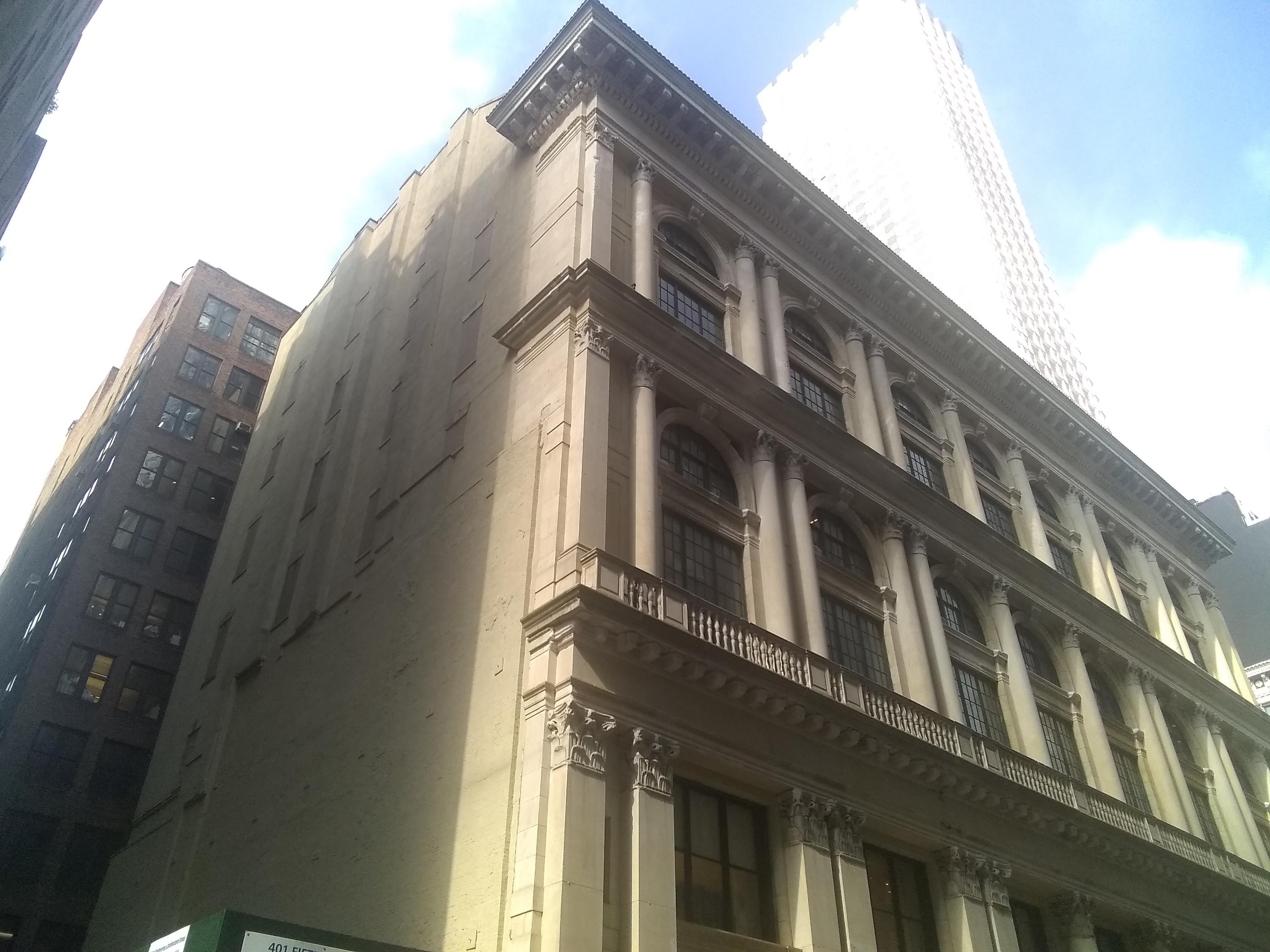
The eastern and northern frontages as seen in 2021

In 1977, Sun Myung Moon of the Unification Church bought the Tiffany & Co. Building for a reported $2.4 million. The Tiffany & Co. Building was added to the National Register of Historic Places (NRHP) as a National Historic Landmark on June 2, 1978. The church promised to restore the Tiffany Building into offices for its daily newspaper, The News World. Within four years, the building had an estimated value of $4.3 million, and it housed the English and Spanish editions of the church's daily newspapers. The New York City Tribune, a subsidiary of The News World, was formed in 1983 and also had its offices in the Tiffany Building. Noticias del Mundo, a newspaper also run by the Unification Church, took some office space as well. The Unification Church planned to eventually restore the Tiffany Building, but it did not conduct any work in the decade after it purchased the building.

The Unification Church proposed restoring the building and erecting a tower above it in 1987. The tower would have been designed by Hardy Holzman Pfeiffer Associates. If built, it would have been 40 stories tall and made of precast concrete. Most of the facade of the original building would have been restored, except for two bays on the highest tier, which would have been removed to create a light court. In February 1987, the New York City Landmarks Preservation Commission (LPC) deferred a decision on whether to designate the Tiffany Building as a city landmark. The next year, the LPC designated the building as a landmark. Meanwhile, News World Communications acquired three lots beside the Tiffany Building to enable the construction of a tower with 500,000 ft^{2} (46,000 m^{2}). The Unification Church canceled its plans to build a tower above the Tiffany Building in 1990, after the LPC rejected a similar tower over the Metropolitan Club building. Instead, the church planned to restore only the exterior storefront signs.

By 1991, the top floor was available for lease. Its broker described the space as being "ideal for a fashion or accessories showroom, or a television or video production company" due to its high ceilings. The Image Group then leased 70,000 ft^{2} (6,500 m^{2}) in the building, spanning four stories. The company taped The Ricki Lake Show on the seventh floor. The Image Group also produced The People's Court in the building, and American Eagle Outfitters occupied two floors by the end of the 20th century.

In 2000, the Stahl Real Estate Company bought the building, evicted three retail tenants, and began restoring the space. After the renovations, Stahl leased out 8,800 ft^{2} (820 m^{2}) on the ground floor and 9,500 ft^{2} (880 m^{2}) in the basement. The piers at the ground story were restored, although they were much lighter in color than the original piers above them. American Eagle moved its offices out of the building in 2024, and a $95 million loan on 401 Fifth Avenue went to special servicing the same year.

== Reception ==
When the building opened, Architects and Builders magazine said the interior color scheme "has been treated by a master hand". Henry James described the building as "a great nobleness of white marble... with three fine arched and columned stages above its high basement". James described the building as having been designed "within the conditions of sociable symmetry", complementing McKim, Mead & White's other buildings on Fifth Avenue, including the Knickerbocker Trust Company Building, the Gorham Building, and the clubhouses of the University Club of New York and Metropolitan Club. Architectural Record wrote: "Compared to the Gorham Building, the Tiffany Building is by way of being frivolous". Henry Olmsted Jr. said: "Architects and Capitalists are awakening to the splendid returns obtained from building construction embodying the best skill and materials money can purchase", with the Tiffany Building being one such example.

When the building was renovated in the 1950s, architectural writer Lewis Mumford disapproved of the changes, saying there should be a "Society for the Prevention of Cruelty to Buildings". In the late 1970s, Paul Goldberger said the Tiffany and Gorham buildings were "splendid examples" of Renaissance palazzos on Fifth Avenue, even though the style "did not remain the favored architectural motif of the avenue for too long". Architectural critic Ada Louise Huxtable described the Burger King's presence at ground level as part of "the mutilation of Fifth Avenue", while Robert A. M. Stern described it as an "indignity". By 1990, Christopher Gray had described the building as "a notorious object lesson in how not to treat a landmark"; at the time, the facade was extremely dirty. Even after the lower section of the facade had been restored in the 2000s, Gray described the restored section as being like "a pair of khakis dipped in bleach".

== See also ==
- List of National Historic Landmarks in New York City
- List of New York City Designated Landmarks in Manhattan from 14th to 59th Streets
- National Register of Historic Places listings in Manhattan from 14th to 59th Streets
- Tiffany & Co.
