= Berkey and Gay Furniture Company Factory =

Manufacturing plant in Grand Rapids, Michigan, US

- U.S. National Register of Historic Places
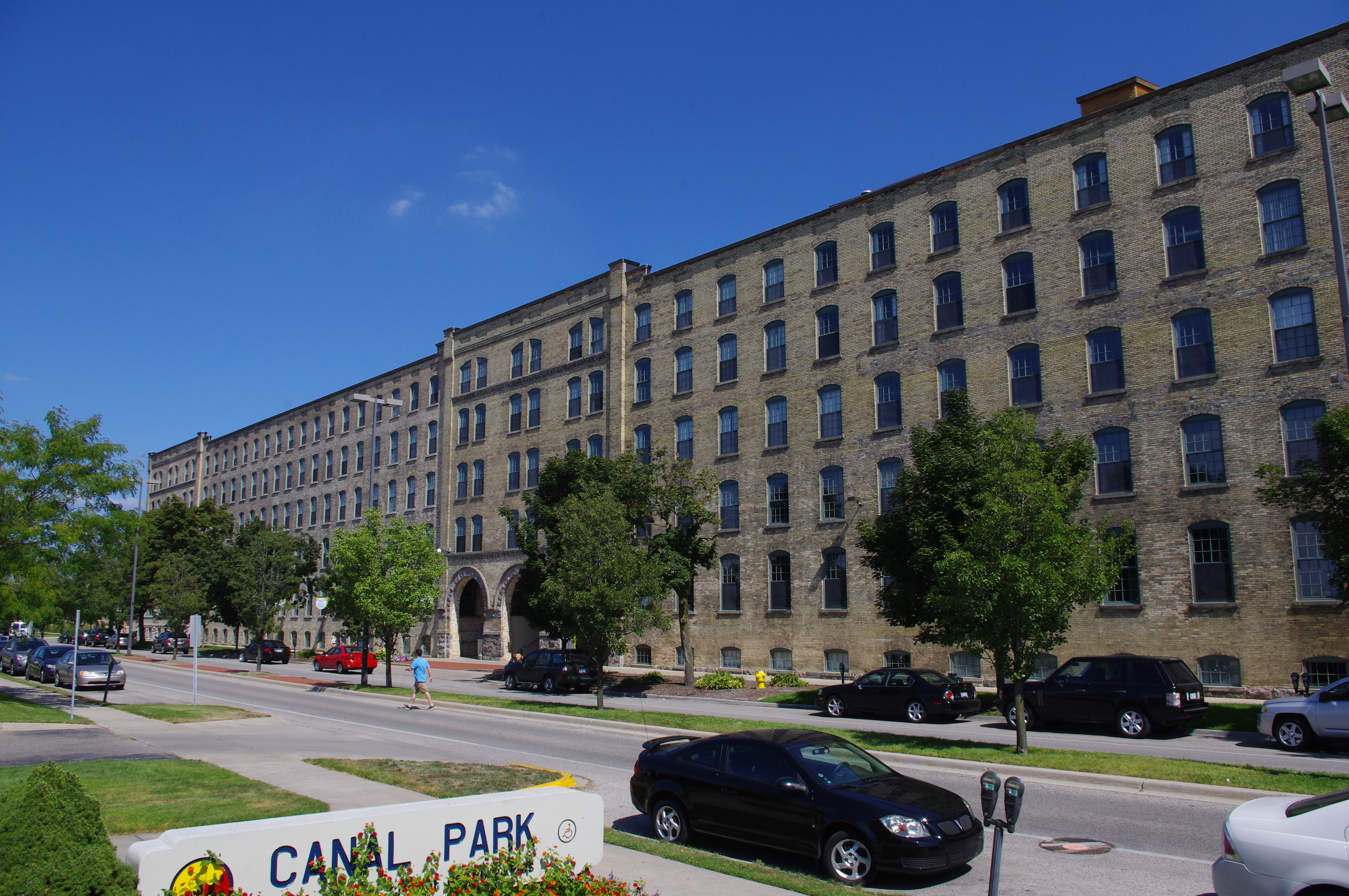

- Location within Michigan Location within the United States
- Interactive map
- Location: 940 Monroe Ave. NW, Grand Rapids, Michigan
- Coordinates: 42°58′44″N 85°40′18″W
- Area: 28 acres (11 ha)
- Built: 1892
- Architectural style: Romanesque
- NRHP reference No.: 00001486
- Added to NRHP: December 20, 2000

The Berkey and Gay Furniture Company Factory is a manufacturing plant located at 940 Monroe Avenue NW in Grand Rapids, Michigan. It was listed on the National Register of Historic Places in 2000.

== History ==
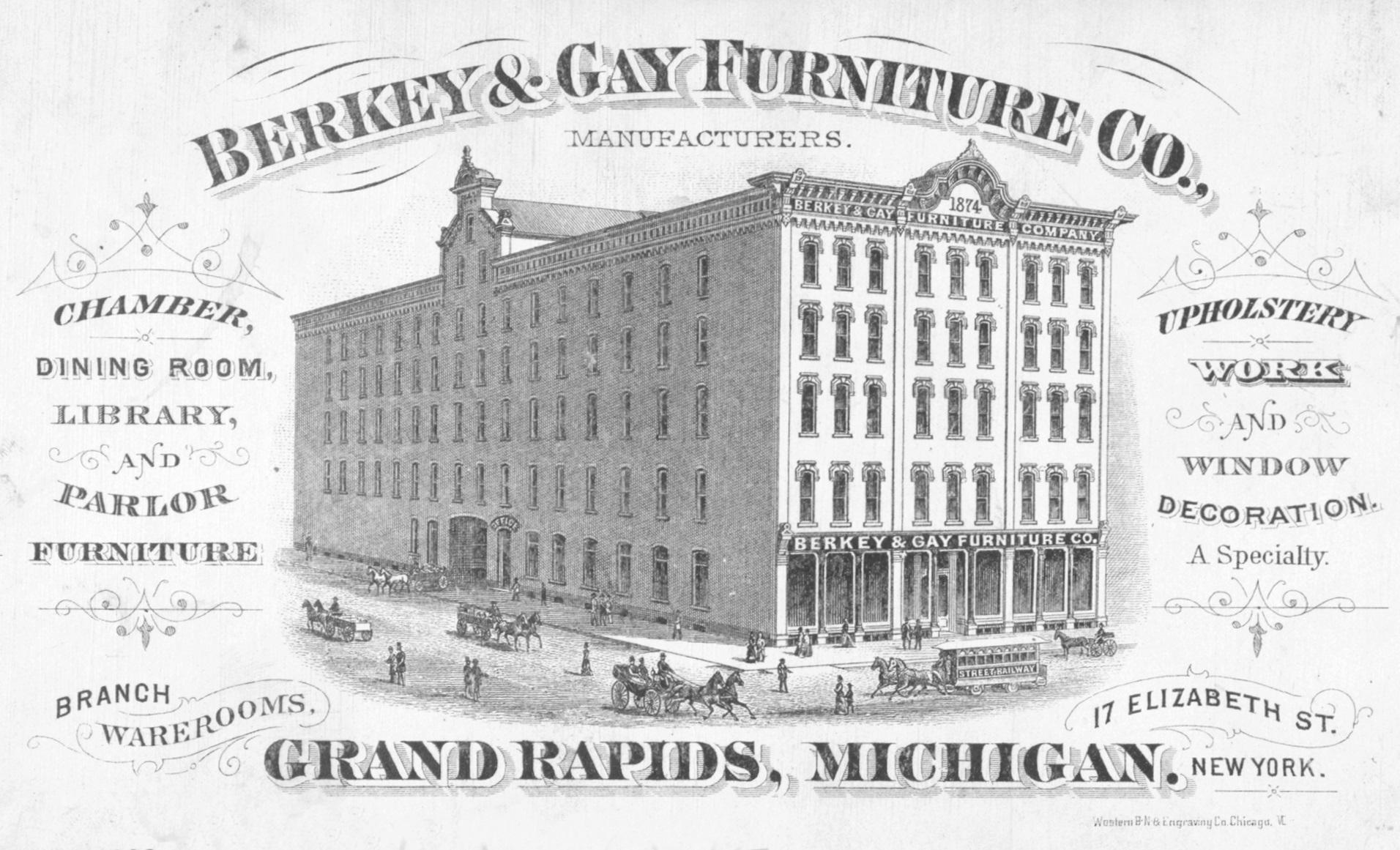
Promotional engraving for the Berkey and Gay Furniture Company, c. 1870s

In 1855, William Berkey arrived in Grand Rapids and founded a mill to manufacture window sashes and other wood building products. He was joined by his brother, Julius, who later began manufacturing what became known as the "Berkey Table." This was highly successful, and soon the Berkey brothers were concentrating on making furniture. The company took on various partners over time, including George W. Gay, who bought an interest in the company in 1866 to form "Berkey Bros and Gay." In 1873, William Berkey withdrew from the company, and Julius Berkey and George W. Gay incorporated to form the Berkey & Gay Furniture Company. In 1874, the new company opened their six-story factory, complete with wholesale and retail showrooms, in Grand Rapids. By 1882, this factory covered three city blocks. The company is known for making Victorian furniture. George W. Gay, although continuing to be involved with Berkey & Gay, also struck out on his own business ventures. One of these was the Oriel Cabinet Company, which he established in 1880. Oriel Cabinet constructed a factory at this site in the 1880s, but the original factory was destroyed by fire in 1890. In 1892, the company constructed a new factory, which continues to occupy the site. Both Oriel Cabinet and Berkey & Gay continued independently until 1911, when the two companies merged. The Oriel factory became Berkey & Gay's Plant No. 1 following the merger, and an addition was immediately made to the plant in 1912. In 1919 the company further expanded the factory 240 feet north along Monroe Avenue.

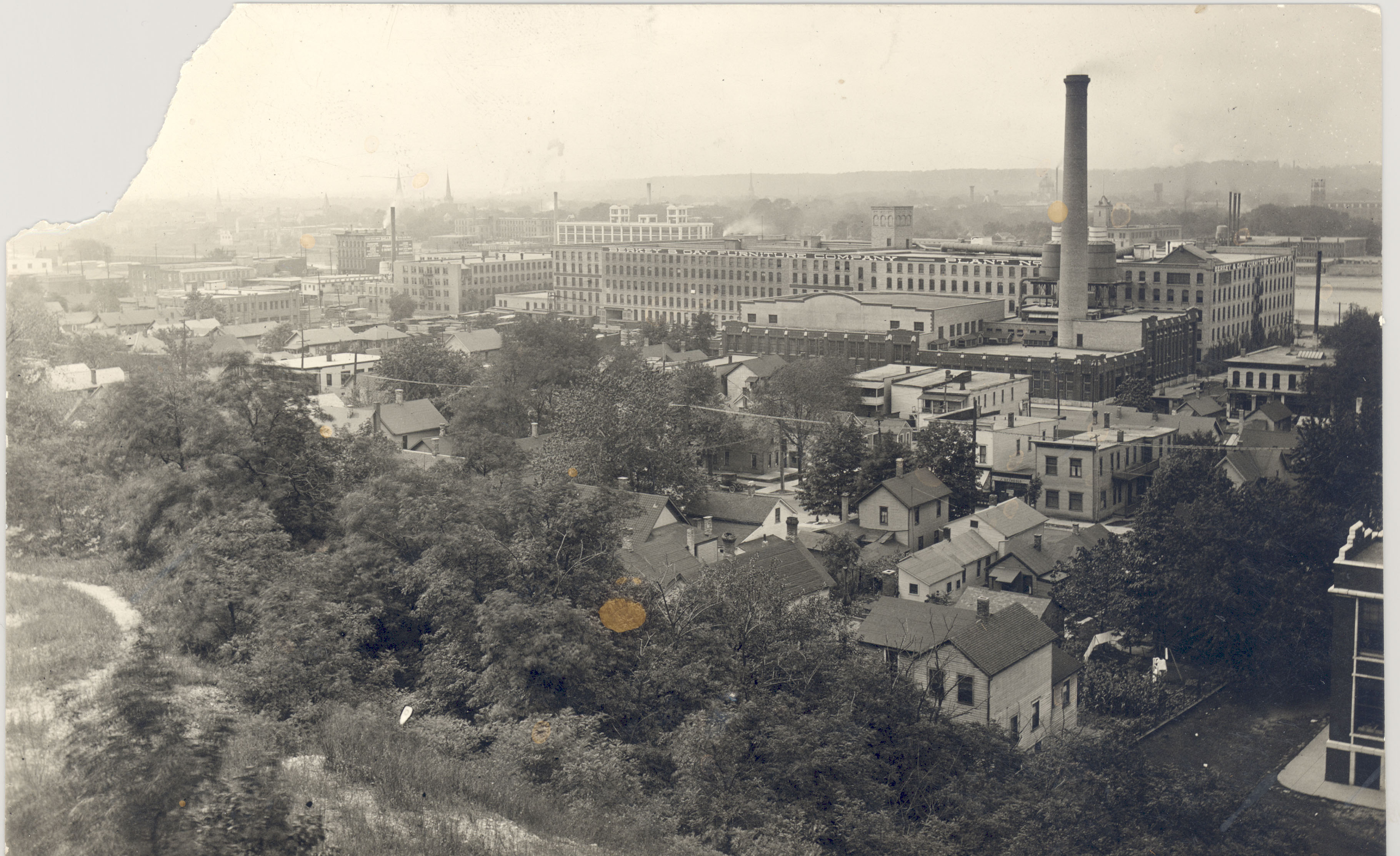
Aerial view of the factory, 1924

In 1920, the company merged with the Wallace Furniture Company and the Grand Rapids Upholstery Company to form Consolidated Furniture Companies, but continued to use the trademark "Berkey & Gay" because of its name recognition. Sales increased in the 1920s and the company aggressively expanded, However, when the Great Depression hit, the company was unable to continue financing their new sites, and was forced to sell to the Chicago-based Simmons Company. Even this was not enough, as Simmons declared bankruptcy in 1931, and the Grand Rapids factories closed their doors. Local stockholders reopened the factory in 1935, and continued production until World War II, when it was converted to wartime needs. After the war, an attempt was made to convert back to furniture production, but the company was again forced to declare bankruptcy in 1948 and closing the factory for good.

Since the closing of factory operations, the Berkey & Gay Furniture Company Factory was used for a variety of smaller tenants, ranging from small manufacturers to artists. By 2000, the building underwent rehabilitation to create residential apartments and retail commercial space.

== Description ==
The Berkey & Gay Furniture Company Factory is a massive, five-story, flat-roofed, cream brick building. It is basically rectilinear, with two open interior courtyards. The plant consists of three sections. The oldest section, constructed in 1892 by the Oriel Cabinet Company, is a U-shape building which now forms the southernmost part of the factory. The second section, constructed in 1912 after the merger, is an east side addition which enclosed the U-shape of the original building to create what is now the south courtyard. The third section was built in 1921, and is a U-shaped addition on the north side, which created a second courtyard and nearly doubled the area of the building.

On the main facade, three groups of three large, two-story round arch openings are located at the street level: one grouping in the center of the facade and one at each end. The arches are formed with rusticated stonework, reminiscent of Richardsonian Romanesque style. Above the arches are paired windows on each of the upper four levels. Between these sections are long rows of single, regularly spaced segmental arch, twelve-over-twelve, double-hung wood windows. Atop the building is a brick parapet cap. The 1892 and 1912 building sections sit on a stone foundation, and the later 1921 addition has a concrete foundation.
