= B. Altman and Company =

Department store in New York City

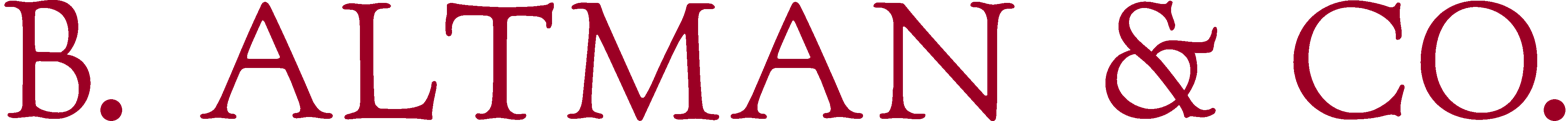
- Industry: Retail Department Store
- Founded: New York City, USA (1865)
- Founder: Benjamin Altman
- Defunct: January 29, 1990
- Fate: Bankruptcy
- Headquarters: 361 5th Ave; New York, NY 10016, USA
- Number of locations: 4
- Area served: New York metropolitan area
- Key people: Benjamin Altman
- Products: High Fashion, upscale clothing

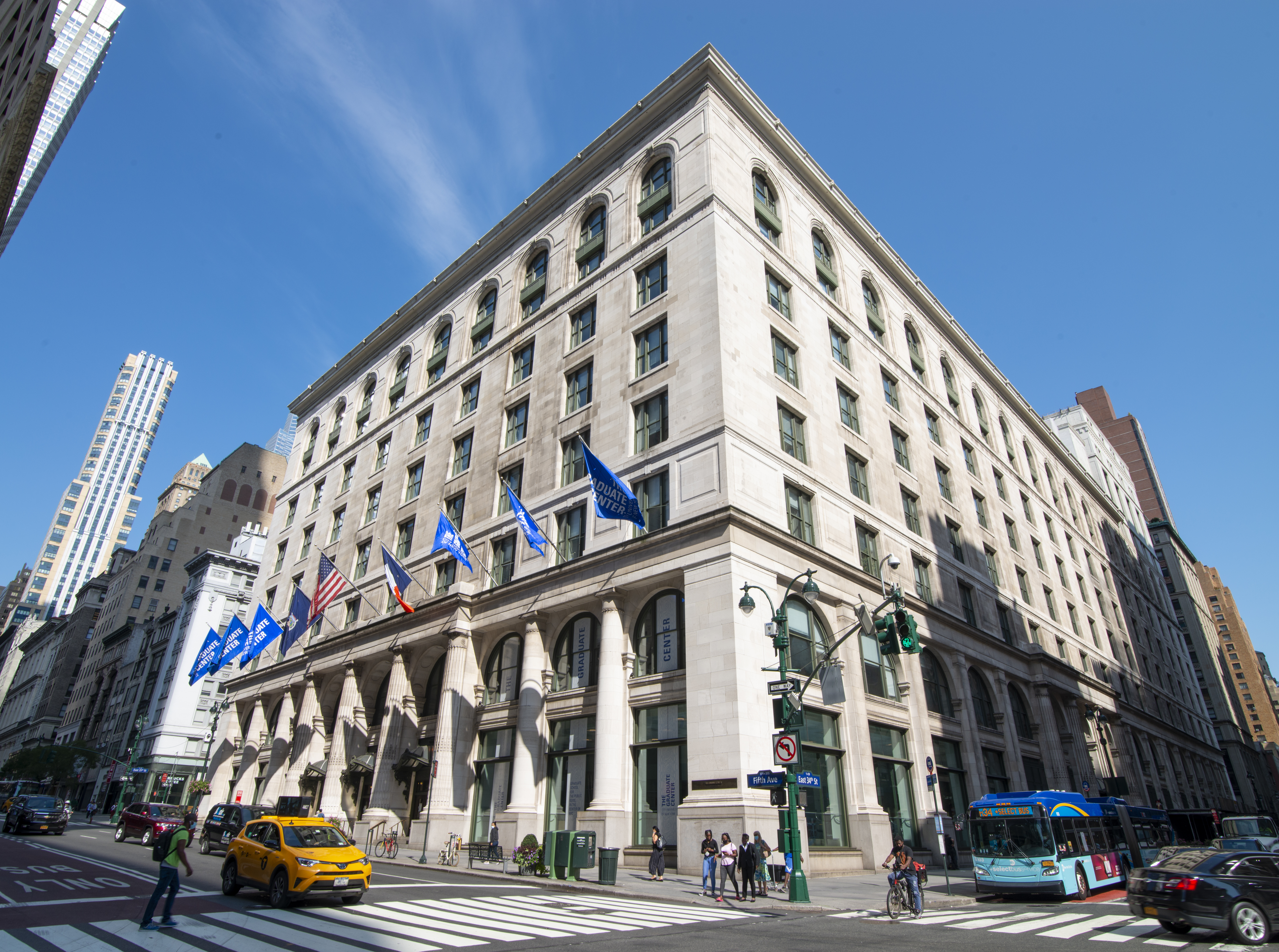
B. Altman's Fifth Avenue store, which is now home to The Graduate Center of The City University of New York, Church Pension Group, and Oxford University Press

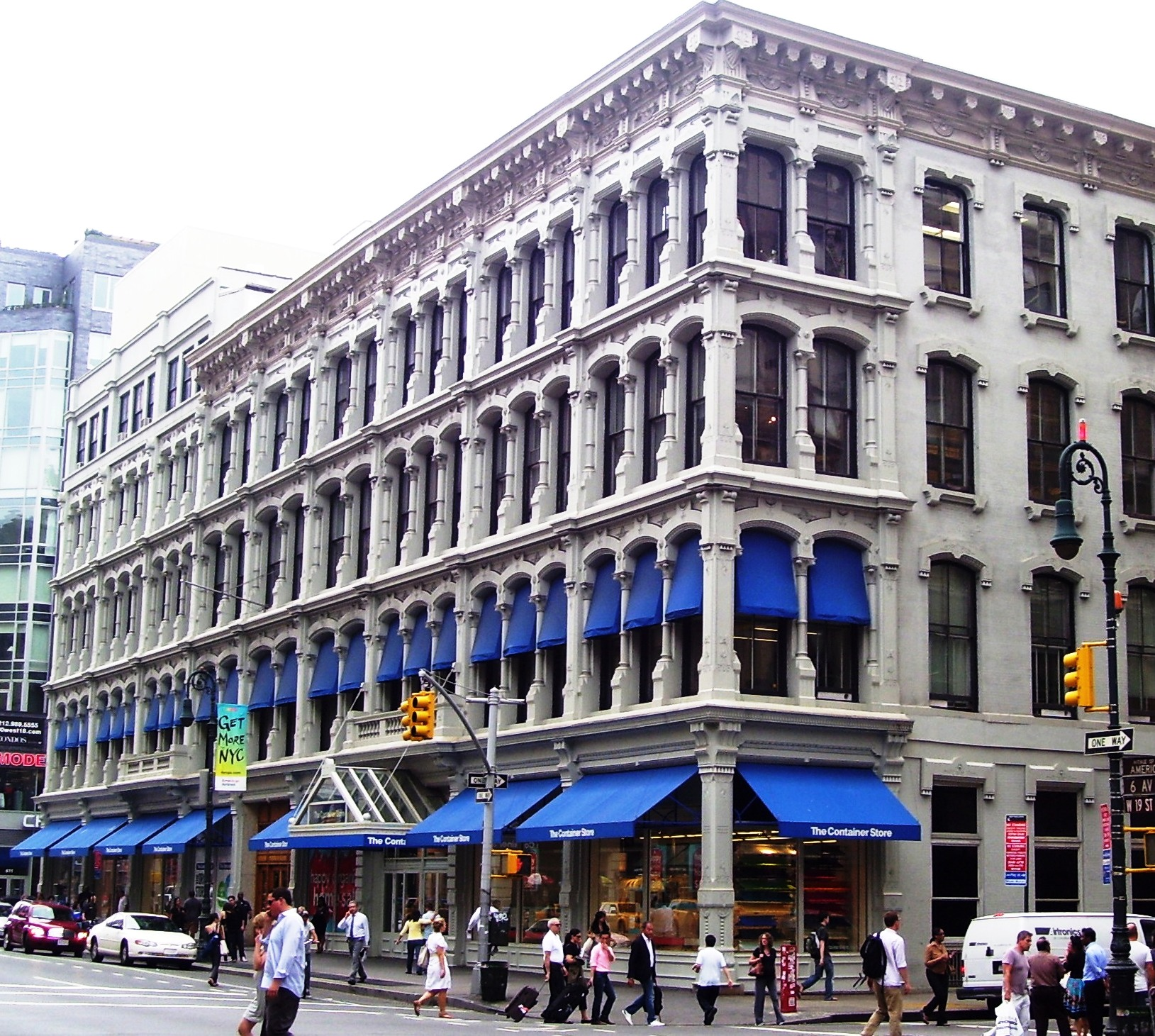
Altman's store on Sixth Avenue in the Ladies' Mile shopping district

B. Altman and Company was a luxury department store and chain, founded in 1865 in New York City, New York, by Benjamin Altman. Its flagship store, the B. Altman and Company Building at Fifth Avenue and 34th Street in Midtown Manhattan, operated from 1906 until the company closed the store at the end of 1989. Branch stores were all shuttered by the end of January 1990.

One of the first American department stores to open out-of-town branches, Altman's eventually opened locations in Pennsylvania (St. Davids in 1965 and Willow Grove in 1983), New Jersey (Short Hills in 1958—replacing an earlier nearby East Orange store—and Ridgewood/Paramus in 1967); and New York state (Manhasset in 1947 and White Plains in 1930). A short-lived location in Cincinnati, Ohio, opened during the L.J. Hooker ownership period (1987–1989), and two mall locations in Buffalo and Syracuse, New York, were physically completed but never occupied by Altman's during that same time.

== History ==
The store that would become B. Altman and Company began on Manhattan's Lower East Side as a family-owned store, which by 1865 had come to be solely owned by Benjamin Altman, one of the brothers in the family, and was located at Third Avenue and 10th Street. In 1877, the store, wanting to expand, relocated to 621 Sixth Avenue between 18th and 19th Streets. This neo-Grec building was put up in four stages, and was designed by David and John Jardine (the original building, 1876–77, and the 1880 extension), William Hume (1887) and Buchman & Fox (1909–1910).

Historic Logo

By 1906, though, Altman's had moved to its new block-long B. Altman and Company Building running from 34th to 35th Streets, which was expanded in stages through 1913 to 188–89 Madison Avenue. The original Fifth Avenue building and the extensions were all designed by Trowbridge & Livingston in Italian Renaissance style. Altman's was one of the first big department stores to make the move from the "Ladies' Mile" shopping district, where the dry-goods emporia had been located, to Fifth Avenue – Macy's made the same move 4 years prior in 1902. That neighborhood was still almost entirely residential at the time, and the design of the new building, across the street from the grand residence of department-store rival A. T. Stewart's and diagonally across the avenue from the residence of Mrs. Astor, was planned to fit in with these palatial mansions around it. Following Altman's example, other big stores made the move uptown, such as Lord & Taylor, which moved to another Fifth Avenue building in 1914.

In the 1930s, Altman's made one of the early entries in the suburbs, with branches opening in East Orange (later relocated to Short Hills), White Plains and Manhasset. The foresight of the organization in geographical selection can be seen in that the Short Hills location is now The Mall at Short Hills, the White Plains location is now The Westchester shopping mall, and the Manhasset location is adjacent to the Americana Manhasset, which opened nine years after the Altman's store.

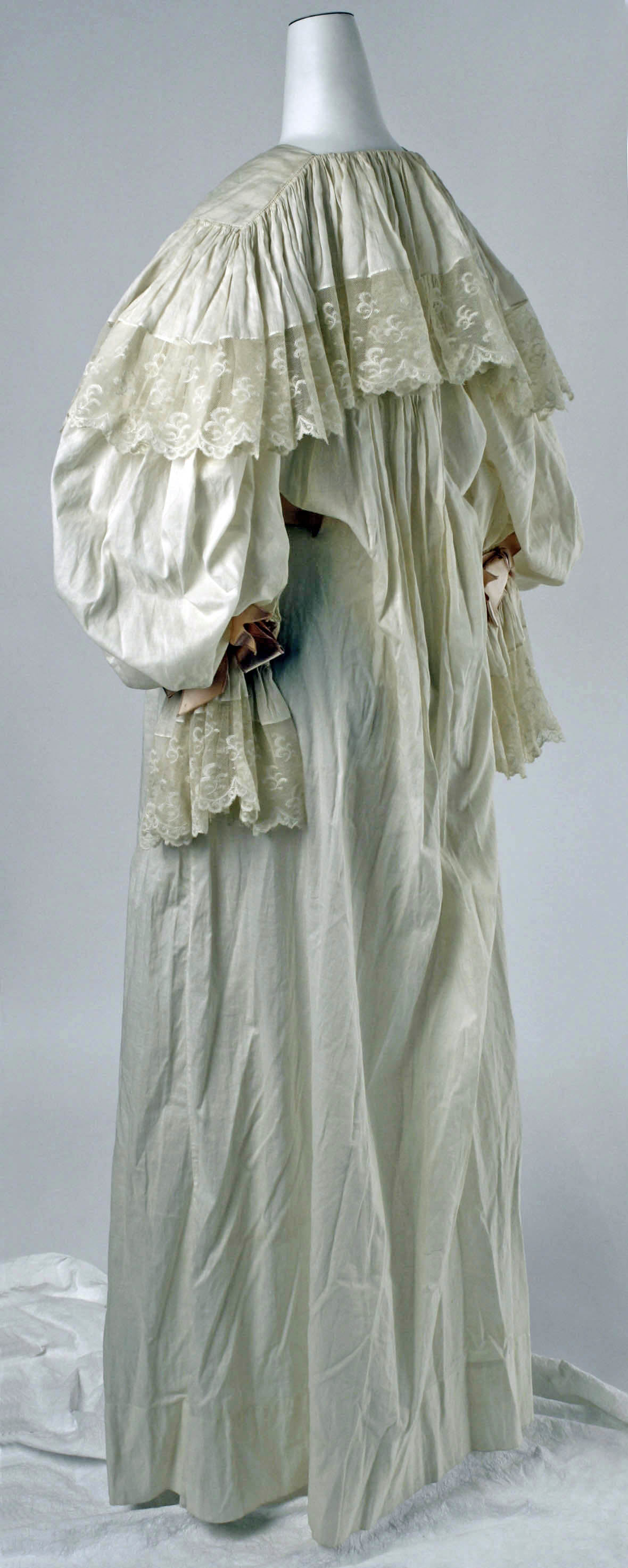
Artist Creator:B. Altman & Co (1894), Metropolitan Museum of Art.

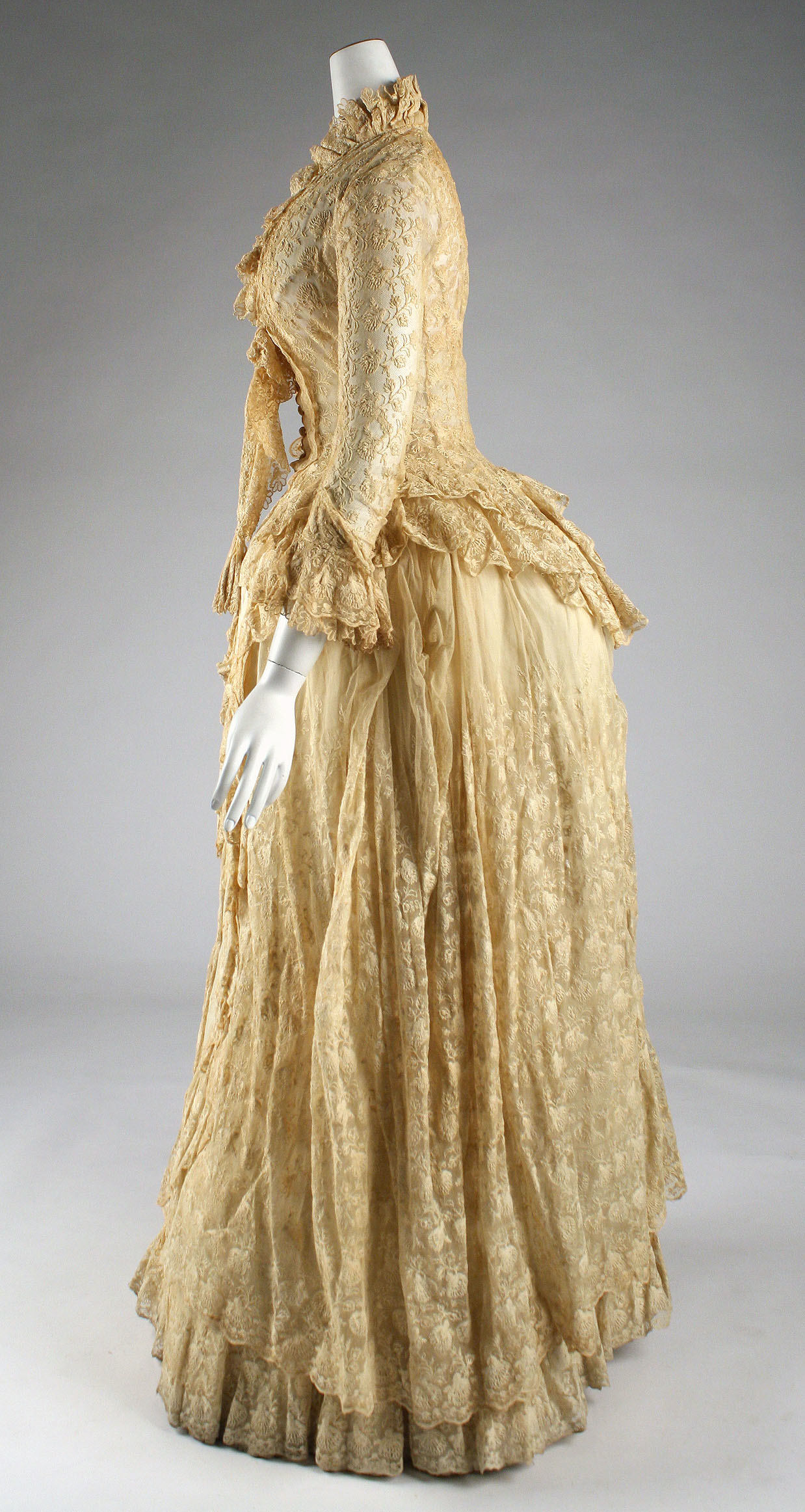
Artist Creator:B. Altman & Co (1883), Metropolitan Museum of Art.

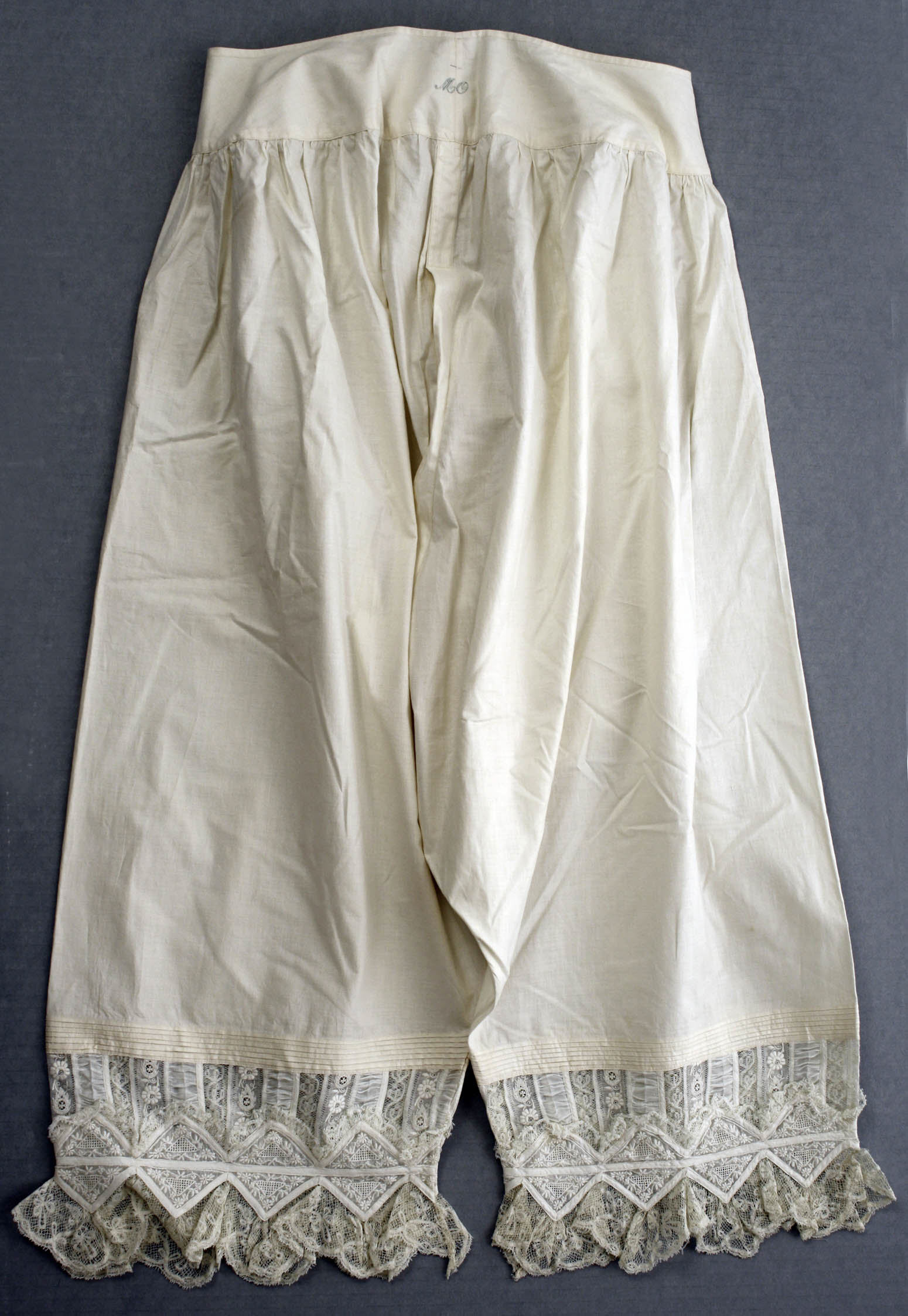
Artist Creator:B. Altman & Co (1881), Metropolitan Museum of Art.

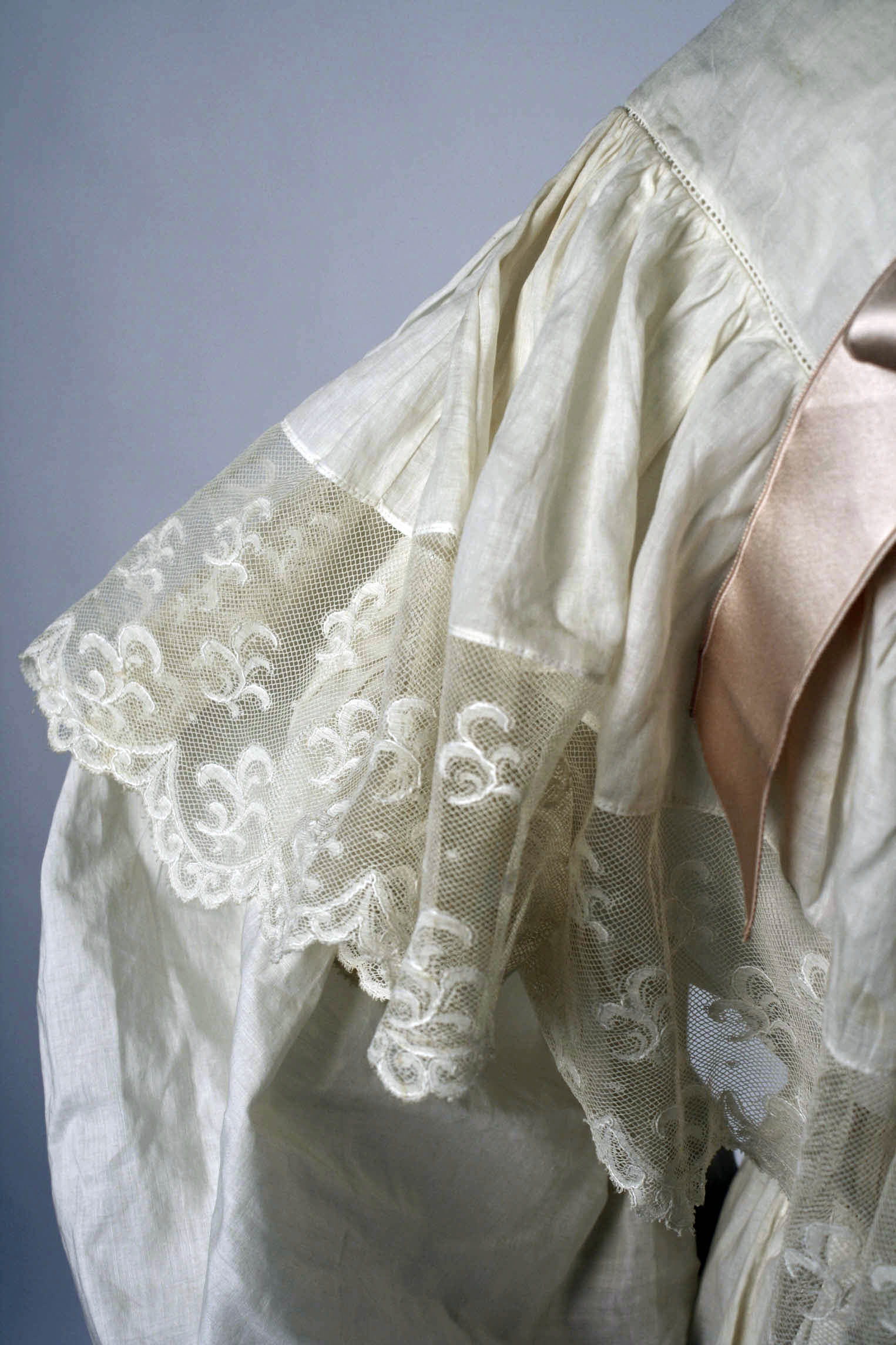
Artist Creator:B. Altman & Co (1894), Metropolitan Museum of Art.

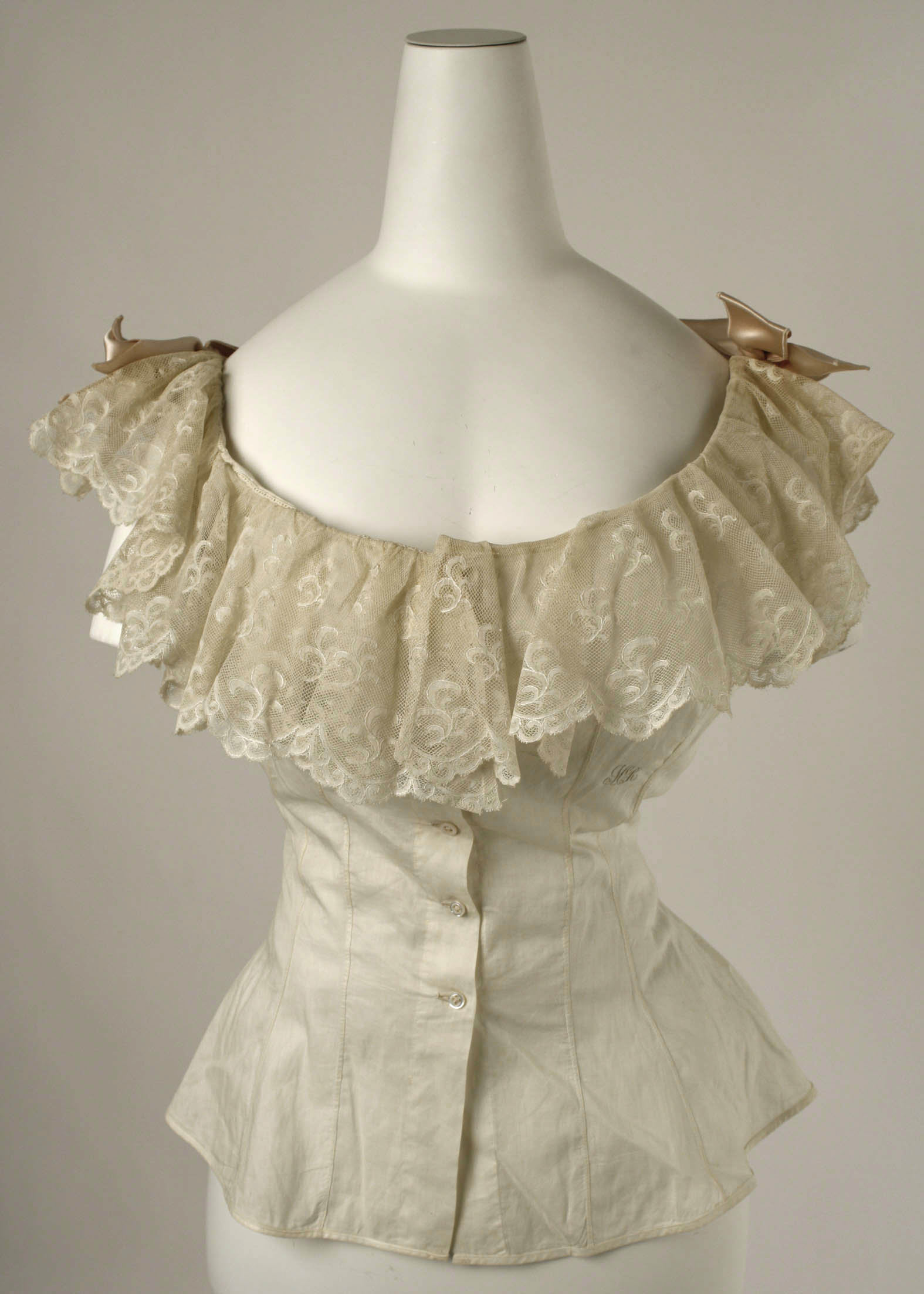
Artist Creator:B. Altman & Co (1894), Metropolitan Museum of Art.

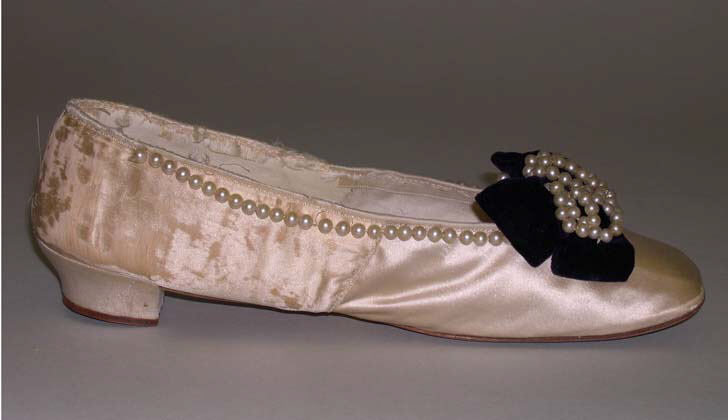
Artist Creator:B. Altman & Co (1850), Metropolitan Museum of Art.

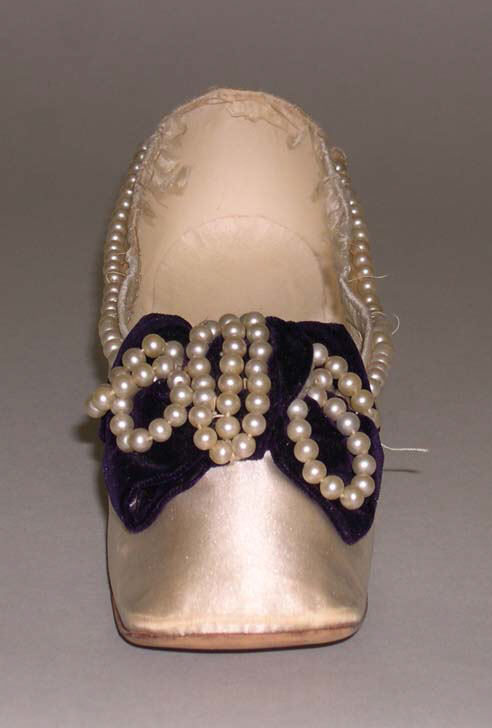
Artist Creator:B. Altman & Co (1850), Metropolitan Museum of Art.

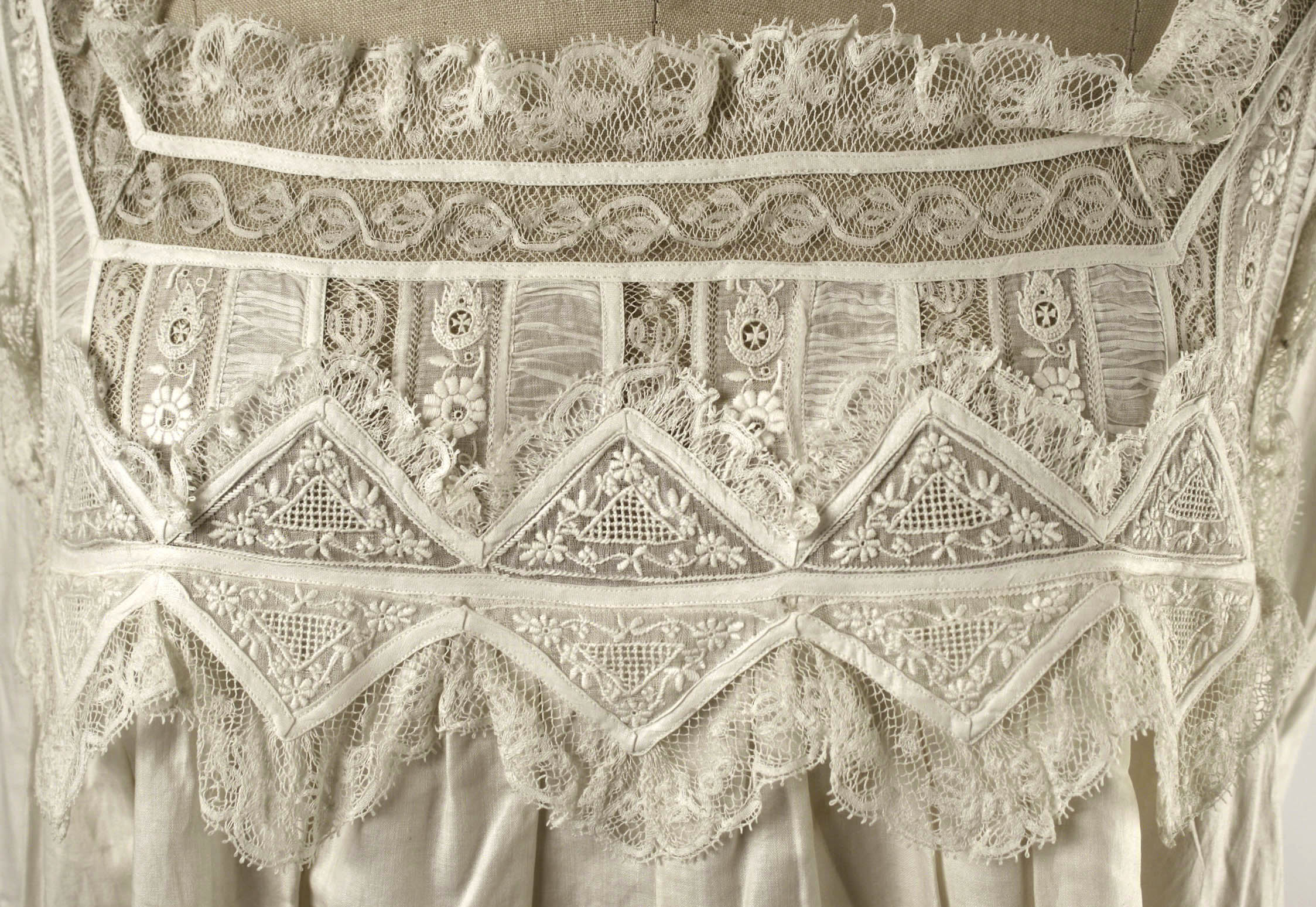
Artist Creator:B. Altman & Co (1881), Metropolitan Museum of Art.

== After Altman's death ==
When Benjamin Altman died in 1913 at the age of 73, his stock in the stores was placed into the Altman Foundation. Altman's art collection, which included many Rembrandts, went to New York City's Metropolitan Museum of Art. In 1986, due to changing IRS rulings, the foundation sold the stores to an investor group that included members of the Gucci family and two principals from financial firm Deloitte & Touche.

In 1987, Australian real estate development company L.J. Hooker and its chief executive officer, George Herscu, purchased the controlling interest in the B. Altman stores (as well as Bonwit Teller, Sakowitz and a majority of Parisian). Hooker used these chains as anchors in poorly located, yet extravagant, new shopping centers across the country. With Hooker and Herscu knowing virtually nothing about how to operate these various retail chains, and then placing them in locations with no regard for market recognition or demographics, their strategy failed miserably, and in August 1989 B. Altman filed for bankruptcy, with the last store closing in 1990. The suburban Buffalo location at the huge Walden Galleria complex was, in fact, fully completed and fixtured but never occupied by Altman's. It would later be occupied in 1991 by local department store AM&A's and eventually a Bon-Ton, which vacated in 2006. This never-opened Altman's location was demolished for a new cinema complex and mall expansion. The Carousel Center Mall location in Syracuse was under construction at the time and redesigned to house a succession of several discount anchors, one on each of the two floors.

The store had a reputation for gentility and conservatism. It was regarded as similar to Marshall Field & Company in Chicago. Highlighting its sober reputation, the stores included a satellite location of Colonial Williamsburg's Craft House that sold classic colonial reproductions. Two lost treasures from the store are the famous Christmas windows, which rivalled those in the Lord & Taylor Building, a few blocks up Fifth Avenue, as well as the Charleston Gardens restaurant, which housed a full-sized facade of a Tara-like Charleston home. The St. David's location and the other branch stores also had a Charleston Garden restaurant.

== Buildings ==
On March 12, 1985, Altman's Fifth Avenue building was designated a New York City landmark. When Altman's closed, the building stood vacant until 1996, when the exterior was restored by Hardy Holzman Pfeiffer and the interior reconfigured by Gwathmey Siegel & Associates. The Fifth Avenue side was used by the City University of New York's Graduate Center, while the Madison Avenue side was used by the New York Public Library's Science, Industry and Business Library and by Oxford University Press.

In addition, Altman's Sixth Avenue building is part of the Ladies' Mile Historic District created in 1989.

207 East 36th Street, which was used as a stable, garage, and warehouse for Altman's Fifth Avenue building, now serves as the United States Postal Service Murray Hill Annex.

== In popular culture ==
The Manhattan B. Altman store featured in the storyline of the 2017 Amazon Studios television series The Marvelous Mrs. Maisel, in which the main character, Midge Maisel, takes a job on the shop floor. Exterior scenes were filmed at the store's former Fifth Avenue building, while interior scenes were shot in a disused bank in Brooklyn.

== See also ==
- List of companies based in New York City
- List of defunct department stores of the United States
- List of department stores of the United States
- List of defunct retailers of the United States
