= 207 East 36th Street =

Commercial building in Manhattan, New York

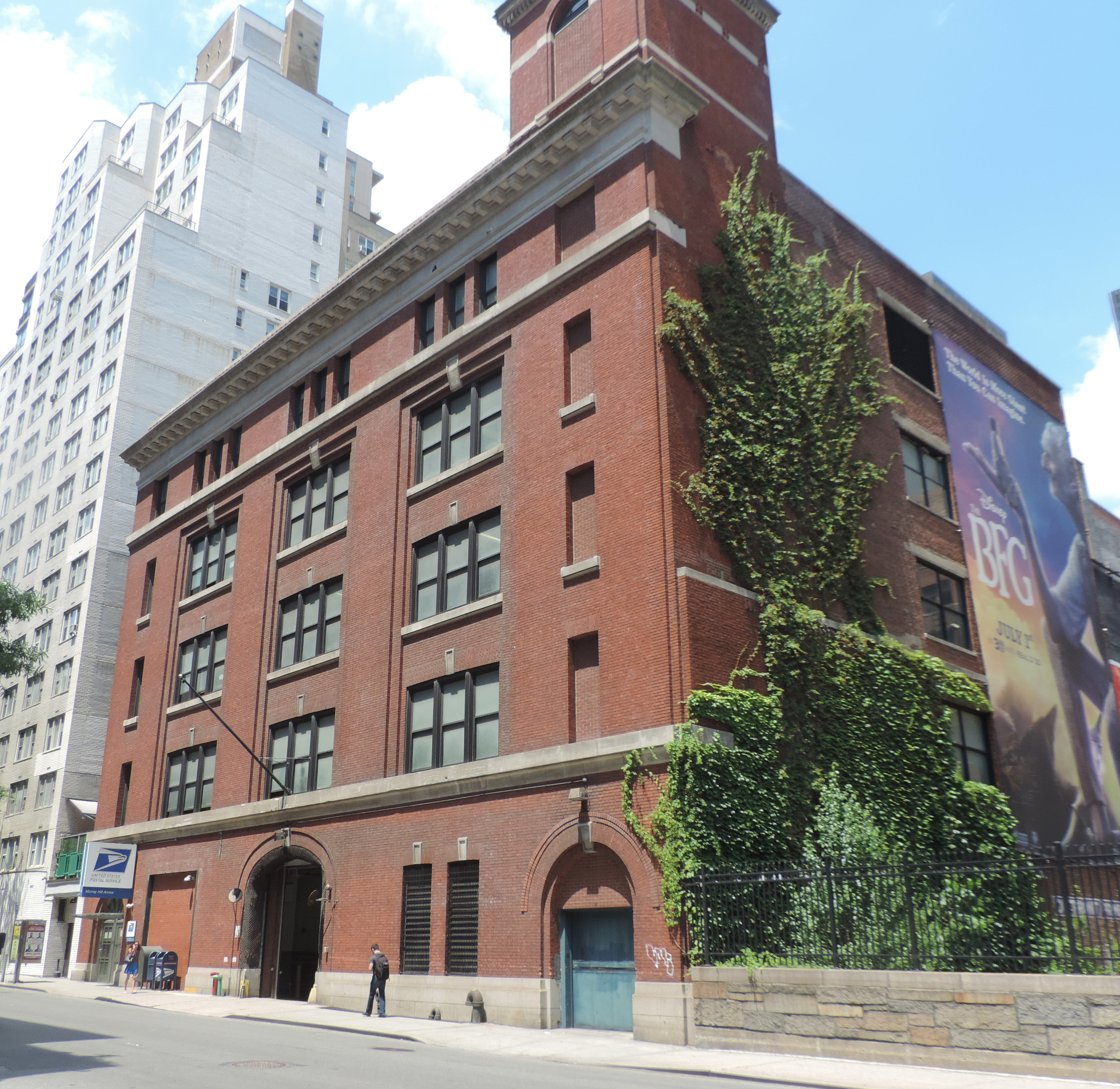
- The building viewed from E. 36th St. in 2016
- Interactive map of the 207 East 36th Street area

General information
- Status: Completed
- Location: New York City, United States
- Coordinates: 40°44′49″N 73°58′35″W
- Year built: 1906

Technical details
- Floor count: 5
- Floor area: 105,000 square feet (9,800 m^{2})

Design and construction
- Architecture firm: Trowbridge & Livingston

207 East 36th Street is a five-story commercial building located between Second and Third avenues in the Murray Hill neighborhood of Manhattan in New York City. The building was constructed in 1906 and originally served as a stable, garage and warehouse for B. Altman and Company. It currently houses the Murray Hill Annex of the United States Postal Service.

== History ==
In 1905, Benjamin Altman acquired a plot of land near Third Avenue in the Murray Hill neighborhood of Manhattan that included 100 feet (30 m) of frontage on East 36th Street and 50 feet (15 m) of frontage on East 37th Street. The following year, plans were prepared for a five-story brick and stone stable on the site. The new structure was located near the B. Altman and Company Building, the company's flagship store that opened in 1906 at the corner of Fifth Avenue and 34th Street and was expanded through 1914 to occupy a full city block, extending east to Madison Avenue and north to 35th Street.

Until 1906, B. Altman & Company's flagship store had been located on Sixth Avenue between West 18th and 19th streets, in an area containing other large department stores that is now designated as the Ladies' Mile Historic District. A five-story stable located at 135 West 18th Street was used by horse drawn carriages to deliver items purchased by customers; as of 2024 the structure still exists as the Altman Building and includes event space used by the adjacent Metropolitan Pavilion. Some of the large department stores began switching to motorized trucks for deliveries at the turn of the century and B. Altman & Company's fleet of vehicles included electric trucks. B. Altman & Company continued making deliveries in trucks operated by the company until 1931, when shipping was taken over by United Parcel Service.

In 1918, Altman purchased five lots running from 215 to 223 East 36th Street to serve as an addition to the original stable. Overall, this new property measured 97.6 by 98.9 feet (29.7 by 30.1 m). Another lot was purchased adjacent to the north side of the building (No. 204), which increased the frontage on East 37th Street to 75 feet (23 m). That same year, plans were filed for a five-story fireproof garage on the new property acquired on East 36th Street. The new building was subsequently displaced by the construction of the exit plaza for the Queens–Midtown Tunnel, which opened in 1940 and included a new north–south street for exiting traffic between Second and Third avenues, running from East 34th to East 41st streets, with an underpass below East 36th Street.

B. Altman and Company sold the original building in 1948, which at the time was being used as a warehouse for the company's furniture and mattress departments, and moved into a new warehouse located at 48–49 35th Avenue in Long Island City. The building was subsequently used as a furniture warehouse and repair factory by John Stuart, Inc. and the United States Postal Service moved into the building by the 1960s, operating the facility as an annex that manually handled parcel post for its Grand Central Station at 450 Lexington Avenue. The property was acquired by the federal government through eminent domain on June 29, 1987.

== Architecture ==
The building was designed by Trowbridge & Livingston, the same architecture firm that designed the B. Altman and Company Building located on the block bounded by Fifth and Madison avenues and 34th and 35th streets. The façade is made of brick and is five stories high. Brick arched entries are located at the ground level, which contain projecting keystones. The façade contains stone belt courses and window sills as well as recessed window bays with splayed brick lintels and projecting keystones. Brick corbelling is located on the fourth level and the fifth level has a modillioned cornice.

== In popular culture ==
The east wall of the building contains a large billboard visible to motorists exiting the Queens–Midtown Tunnel that for many years contained advertisements by British Airways and was described as something that "became a part of New York culture" and "was impossible to miss for anyone arriving New York at their midtown location."
