= The Committee to Save the New York Public Library =

The Committee to Save the New York Public Library (often abbreviated CSNYPL or SaveNYPL) is a volunteer organization that advocates for transparency and reform in the governance of the New York Public Library (NYPL), restoration and strengthening of the NYPL's research libraries, and the preservation enhancement of its extensive network of lending libraries.

The Committee was formed in early 2012 to fight the NYPL's "Central Library Plan," which sought to remove three million books and replace the book stacks in the New York Public Library Main Branch with a lending library. The plan would have been financed, in part, with the sale of the Mid-Manhattan lending library and the Science, Industry, and Business research library. In May 2014, following a campaign in which the Committee garnered wide public support, the NYPL abandoned the Central Library Plan. NYPL announced that it would leave the stacks of the New York Public Library Main Branch intact and renovate, rather than sell, the Mid-Manhattan Library (while still moving forward with plans to sell the Science, Industry, and Business Library).

The Committee is composed of prominent scholars, architects, preservationists, retired librarians, and library patrons of all kinds. It has been supported by Pulitzer Prize winners, and prominent authors and scholars in New York and around the world.
