= Stavros Niarchos Foundation Library =

Library in Manhattan, New York

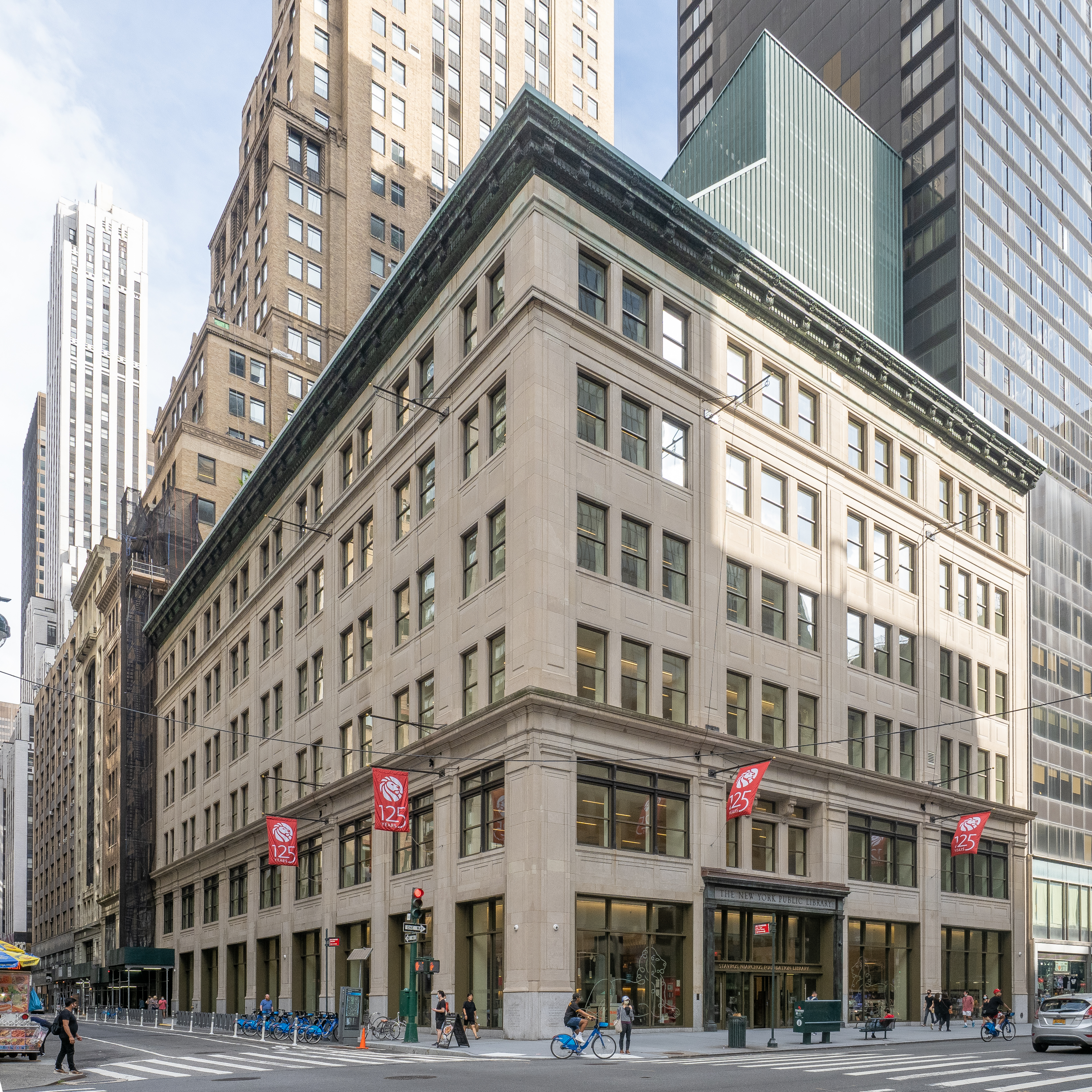
- The Stavros Niarchos Foundation Library, popularly known as the Mid-Manhattan Library
- 40°45′07″N 73°58′54″W
- Location: 455 Fifth Avenue, Manhattan, New York, United States
- Type: Circulating library
- Established: October 1970
- Architects: T. Joseph Bartley (original); Mecanoo (renovation)
- Branch of: New York Public Library

Collection
- Items collected: 400,000

Other information
- Public transit access: Subway: 7, <7>, B, D, F, <F>, and M trains at 42nd Street–Bryant Park/Fifth Avenue; Bus: M1, M2, M3, M4, M5, M42, M55, Q32
- Website: www.nypl.org/locations/snfl

The Stavros Niarchos Foundation Library (SNFL), formerly known as the Mid-Manhattan Library, is a branch of the New York Public Library (NYPL) at the southeast corner of 40th Street and Fifth Avenue in the Midtown Manhattan neighborhood of New York City. It is diagonally across from the NYPL's Main Branch and Bryant Park to the northwest. The Stavros Niarchos Foundation Library has space for 400,000 volumes across a basement and seven above-ground stories. Its design includes 11,000 square feet (1,000 m^{2}) of event space and 1,500 seats for library users.

The Mid-Manhattan Library opened in 1970 to house the circulating collection formerly located in the NYPL's Main Branch. The branch moved to its current building, a former Arnold Constable & Company department store, in 1981. After a failed attempt to close the Mid-Manhattan Library in the 2010s, the NYPL announced a major renovation of the branch in 2014. Between 2017 and 2020, the branch was closed for renovations funded by the Stavros Niarchos Foundation, and the library was renamed after the foundation.

== Description ==
The Stavros Niarchos Foundation Library (SNFL) is a circulating library of the New York Public Library (NYPL) system. It is housed in the former Arnold Constable & Company department store building at 455 Fifth Avenue, on the southeast corner of Fifth Avenue and 40th Street, in Midtown Manhattan, New York City. Arnold Constable acquired the site in 1914 and hired T. Joseph Bartley to design a department store there, which opened in November 1915.

Diagonally across from the building to the northwest are the New York Public Library Main Branch and Bryant Park. 452 Fifth Avenue is across Fifth Avenue to the west while 461 Fifth Avenue is across 40th Street to the north. 10 East 40th Street, where part of the Mid-Manhattan Library was housed in the 1970s, is immediately adjacent to the east.

=== Facade ===
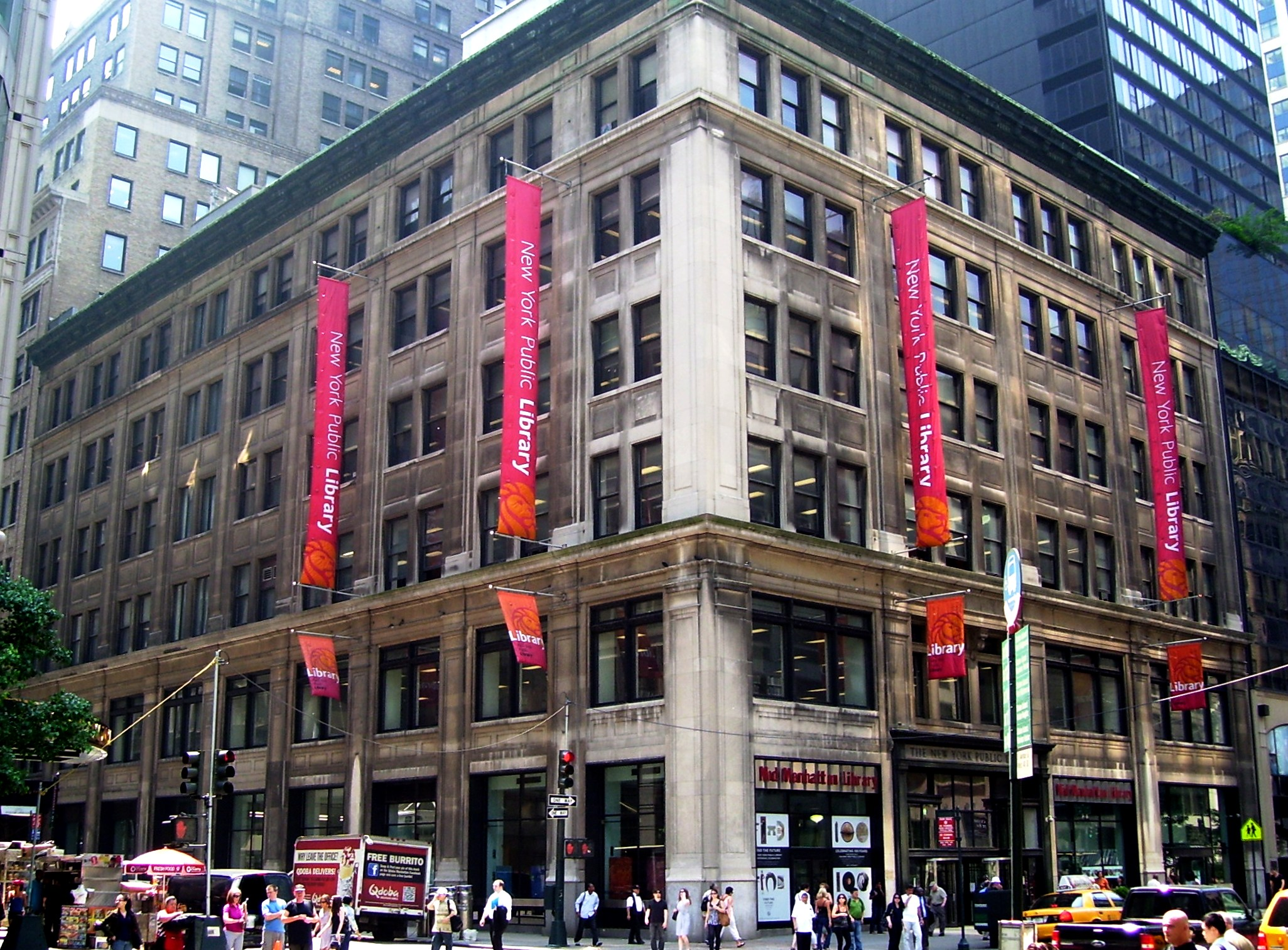
The Mid-Manhattan Library prior to its 2020 renovation

As designed, the building was originally six stories tall with a frontage of 82 feet (25 m) on Fifth Avenue and 175 feet (53 m) on 40th Street. The Constable store had a one-story annex extending one block south to 39th Street. The facade is made of plain white limestone on a granite base. Four entrances originally led into the building: a main entrance from Fifth Avenue, carriage entrances from 40th and 39th Streets, and a smaller entrance from the 39th Street annex. There are cornices above the second, fifth, and sixth floors. A 1980 renovation replaced the original display windows on the first floor with full-height windows.

When the Arnold Constable store had been in operation, the rooftop had contained a brick penthouse with a recreation room and an employee cafeteria. A high parapet surrounded the roof terrace. On the SNFL's rooftop is a terrace with an event space under a "wizard hat" enclosure painted copper green. The "wizard hat" penthouse, which includes the seventh story, was designed to conceal the mechanical equipment there. There is also a "secret garden" overlooking Bryant Park.

=== Interior ===
==== Previous uses ====
When the building opened as an Arnold Constable store, the first floor contained brown Circassian walnut floors and was used as a display area for the store. A small square room with white walls was also on the first floor. The second story had mahogany trimming while the third floor had plain oak trimming. The fourth floor and part of the fifth floor contained executive offices, while the rest of the fifth floor and the whole sixth floor were used for wholesaling. Three staircases outside the building provided emergency exit. There were also four elevators on the south side of the store. Indirect lighting was used throughout the building, as well as steam and indirect heating systems, which at the time of construction were still new technologies.

When the Mid-Manhattan Library opened in 1970, it had 100,000 square feet (9,300 m^{2}) of floor space and could accommodate 350,000 volumes, with plans to expand to 700,000. At least two copies of almost all non-fiction books were provided. The branch also contained 10,000 microfilm reels and 36,000 non-circulating books. After the 1980 renovation, the branch's interior received color-coded furniture. The history and social sciences section had blue decor; the science and business section, red decor; and the arts and literature section, yellow and orange decor. A job center was on the first floor, and there was also a law library, 850 science magazine subscriptions, and microfilm reels. An escalator remained from when the building was used as a department store.

==== Stavros Niarchos Foundation Library ====
The renovated Stavros Niarchos Foundation Library has space for 400,000 volumes, as well as 11,000 square feet (1,000 m^{2}) of event space and 1,500 seats for library users. The renovation entailed adding 20,000 square feet (1,900 m^{2}) compared to the old Mid-Manhattan Library. On the ground floor, revolving doors and larger windows were added as a reminder of the former department store. A corridor leads from the main entrance on Fifth Avenue and is covered by an awning with wooden beams. A large staircase from the ground floor leads to the basement, which includes a space for children and teenagers. The basement space has a conveyor belt for dropping off books, as well as a public room and a recording studio for teenagers. The basement space also has murals designed by Brooklyn artist Melinda Beck.

The rebuilt library contains a three-story circulating area called the Long Room on the second through fourth floors, each of which has an 85-by-17-foot (25.9 by 5.2 m) opening near their eastern end. This allows patrons to see the stacks on the eastern sides of these floors from the ground story. The space contains reading areas, which are connected by bridges on the second and third stories to the stacks. The reading areas have wooden desks and benches that measure up to 66 feet (20 m) long. The study areas and wooden bookshelves are arranged around the original columns, which were retained in the renovation. There are also group study rooms on each floor. The ceiling of the Long Room, designed by Turkish artist Hayal Pozanti, contains an alphabet of 31 glyphs. These glyphs correspond to characters of the English alphabet as well as to numeric digits.

The fifth floor contains the Thomas Yoseloff Business Center. The business library on that floor was transferred from the collection of the former Science, Industry and Business Library. The sixth floor was turned into an adult education center, the Pasculano Learning Center. On the seventh floor is a 268-seat conference center with a wooden-slatted ceiling. There is also an indoor cafe on the seventh floor, as well as event rooms separated by glass partitions.

== History ==
The circulating collection of the NYPL was long housed in the Main Branch. The NYPL had proposed moving the circulating collection to a new branch on 53rd Street (later the Donnell Library) as early as 1944. While the circulating library was kept in the Main Branch, its single room soon could not hold all of the circulating volumes. The library asked the city to take over responsibility for the circulating and children's collections at the Main Branch in 1949.

=== Founding ===
The NYPL bought the Arnold Constable building as an investment in 1961. That year, the New York Public Library convened a group of six librarians to determine what types of media the circulating library would have. The librarians decided in 1962 that the new branch should be close to the Main Branch. Arnold Constable stopped leasing the fourth through sixth floors to other tenants in 1964, making them available to the NYPL. The NYPL planned to create a 500,000-volume collection on the three top floors, targeted primarily toward college students, who were overwhelming the capacity of the Main Branch's research facilities. However, the circulating library could not open until the NYPL had raised $2.5 million for renovation and $1.275 million for media. By the late 1960s, the Main Branch had become overcrowded and could not accommodate additional patrons, and the children's library at the Main Branch had closed due to a lack of space.

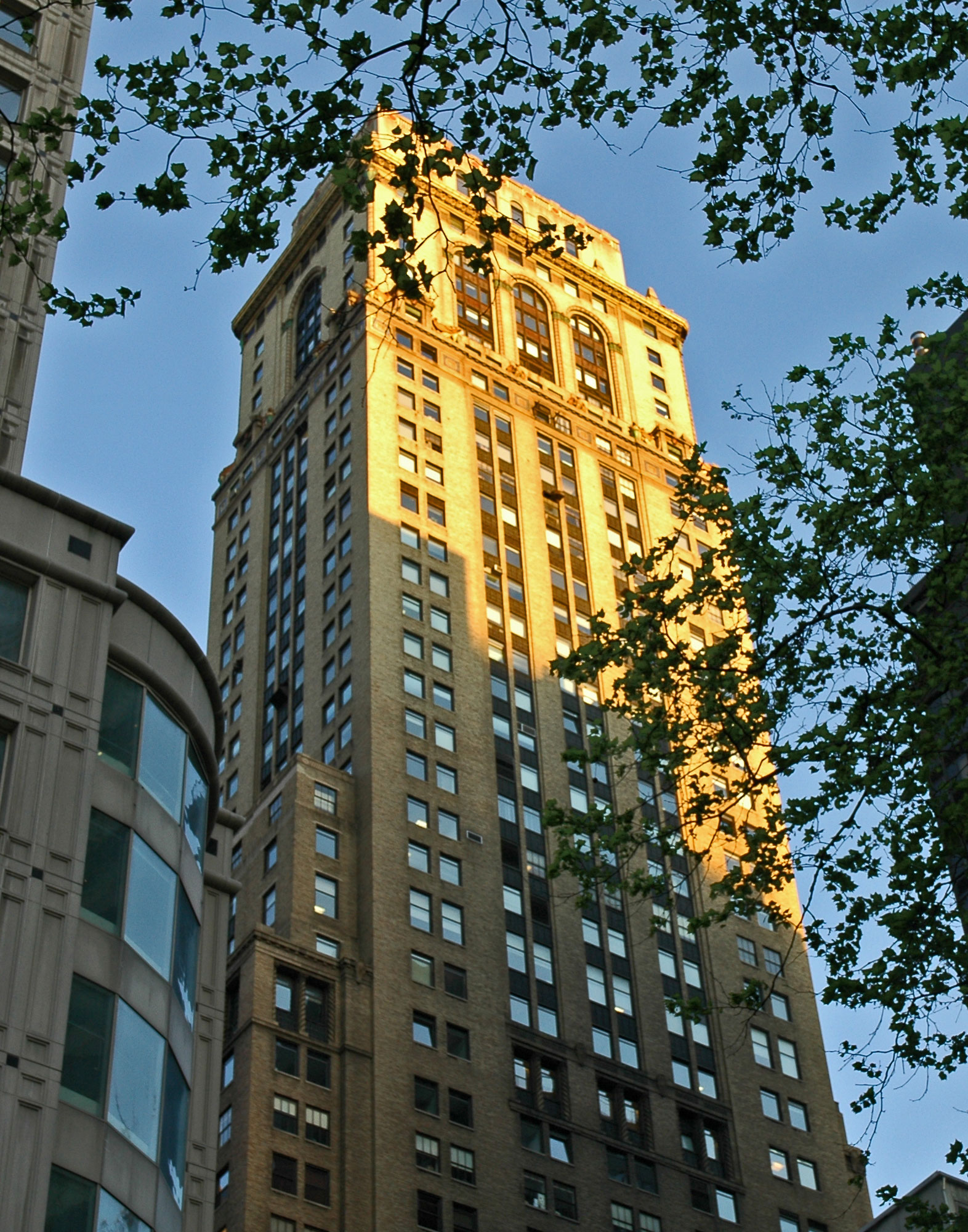
10 East 40th Street, where the Mid-Manhattan Library had space from 1970 to 1982

Bloch & Hesse commenced a renovation of the Arnold Constable building's fourth through sixth floors in 1968, and it was completed in late 1970. The new circulating branch, the Mid-Manhattan Library, opened in the fourth through sixth floors of the building in October 1970. The Main Branch's circulating collection and children's library were moved to the Mid-Manhattan Library. The Mid-Manhattan Library also took space at the neighboring 10 East 40th Street. The buildings had separate lobbies, but the upper floors were connected, and the elevators in the Arnold Constable building were programmed so that library patrons could only access the fourth floor, then take escalators to the fifth and sixth floors. The branch was the 80th to open in the NYPL system, and opened during a period when the NYPL was facing severe fiscal shortfalls. As a result, the telephone reference service at the branch was cut back in 1974.

=== Expansion ===
Arnold Constable announced in February 1975 that it would close its location at the end of that March. The NYPL then announced its intent to occupy the remainder of the Arnold Constable building, move out of 10 East 40th Street entirely, and close the connections between the two buildings. The Vincent Astor Foundation provided a gift to cover the costs of renovation. In 1978, the Dormitory Authority of the State of New York sold $8 million in bonds to finance improvements to the Mid-Manhattan branch. Further funds allowed the Mid-Manhattan Library to extend the operating hours of its circulating collection in 1981.

During 1980, Giorgio Cavaglieri redesigned the lobby, which operated within 10 East 40th Street in the meantime. The Mid-Manhattan Library started moving back into the Arnold Constable building between 1981 and 1982, officially opening in February 1982. Two months after the official opening, the 2.5 million-item Picture Collection was moved to the Mid-Manhattan Library. By 1983, the NYPL had also signed a contract with the Metropolitan Museum of Art to operate a gift shop and bookstore in the Mid-Manhattan Library. Arthur Rosenblatt designed the bookstore. Richard Spaulding commissioned a 124-square-inch (800 cm^{2}) stained glass window above the branch's main entrance in 1986. The window was funded entirely with private money. At the time, the library had over 8,000 visitors a day.

With the opening of the Science, Industry and Business Library (SIBL) at the nearby B. Altman and Company Building in 1996, some 40,000 volumes were relocated to the new branch. Ruth Messinger, the borough president of Manhattan, proposed $1.63 million in funding for renovation of the Mid-Manhattan Library the following year. Three firms proposed designs for the library's renovation in 2000. The renovation was planned to include 25,000 square feet (2,300 m^{2}) of retail space and expanded stacks that could accommodate up to a million items. Hardy Holzman Pfeiffer Associates proposed replacing the existing building with a twisting glass tower, while Smith Miller+Hawkinson proposed additional stories supported on a diagonal truss above the existing building. The winning proposal, by Gwathmey Siegel & Associates Architects, included a serpentine glass tower that would have risen above the Mid-Manhattan Library. This renovation never took place, as the NYPL faced budget cuts in the wake of the September 11 attacks in Lower Manhattan. By the following year, thirty percent of the Mid-Manhattan Branch's shelves were empty due to the NYPL's budgetary shortfalls.

=== 21st-century renovation ===
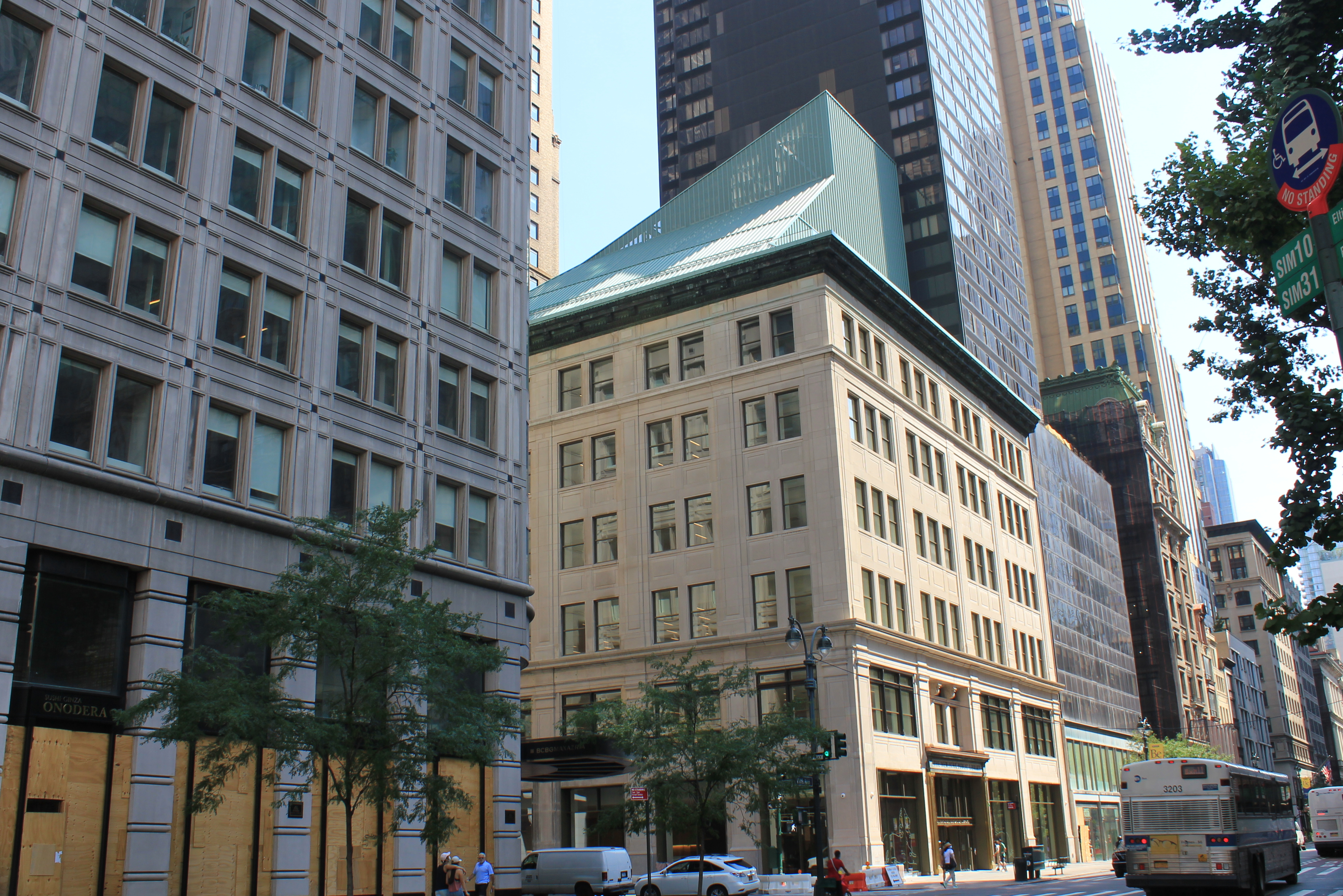
Looking south at the library from near Fifth Avenue and 41st Street

In 2008, the NYPL anticipated that it would sell the Mid-Manhattan and Donnell branches to pay for a renovation of the Main Branch. This led to the announcement of a Central Library Plan, in which the nearby Mid-Manhattan Library and SIBL would be closed, and the Main Branch would be turned into a circulating library. Over a million books would have been put into storage in a warehouse in New Jersey. Despite the plan, which took place during the 2008 financial crisis, the NYPL extended hours at the Mid-Manhattan Library in 2009. Library users heavily criticized the Central Library Plan. After a protracted battle and two public interest lawsuits, the plan was abandoned in May 2014 due to pressure by its opponents and the election of Bill de Blasio as mayor.

After the abandonment of the Central Library Plan, the trustees announced a new plan in June 2014, which provided for renovations to the Main Branch's stacks and the rehabilitation of the Mid-Manhattan Library. Dutch firm Mecanoo was selected for the renovation, and the NYPL's board of trustees approved the plans in November 2016. At the time, the branch received 1.7 million visits per year. By then, NYPL president Anthony Marx had started to describe the aging library as an "embarrassment" to the NYPL network. In August 2017, the Mid-Manhattan Library was closed for a $200 million renovation, and an interim circulating library opened in the Main Branch at 42nd Street. The Mid-Manhattan Library's collection of pictures was also temporarily relocated to the Main Branch. The SIBL would be closed after the Mid-Manhattan Library's renovation was completed. The renovation was intended to meet Leadership in Energy and Environmental Design certifications.

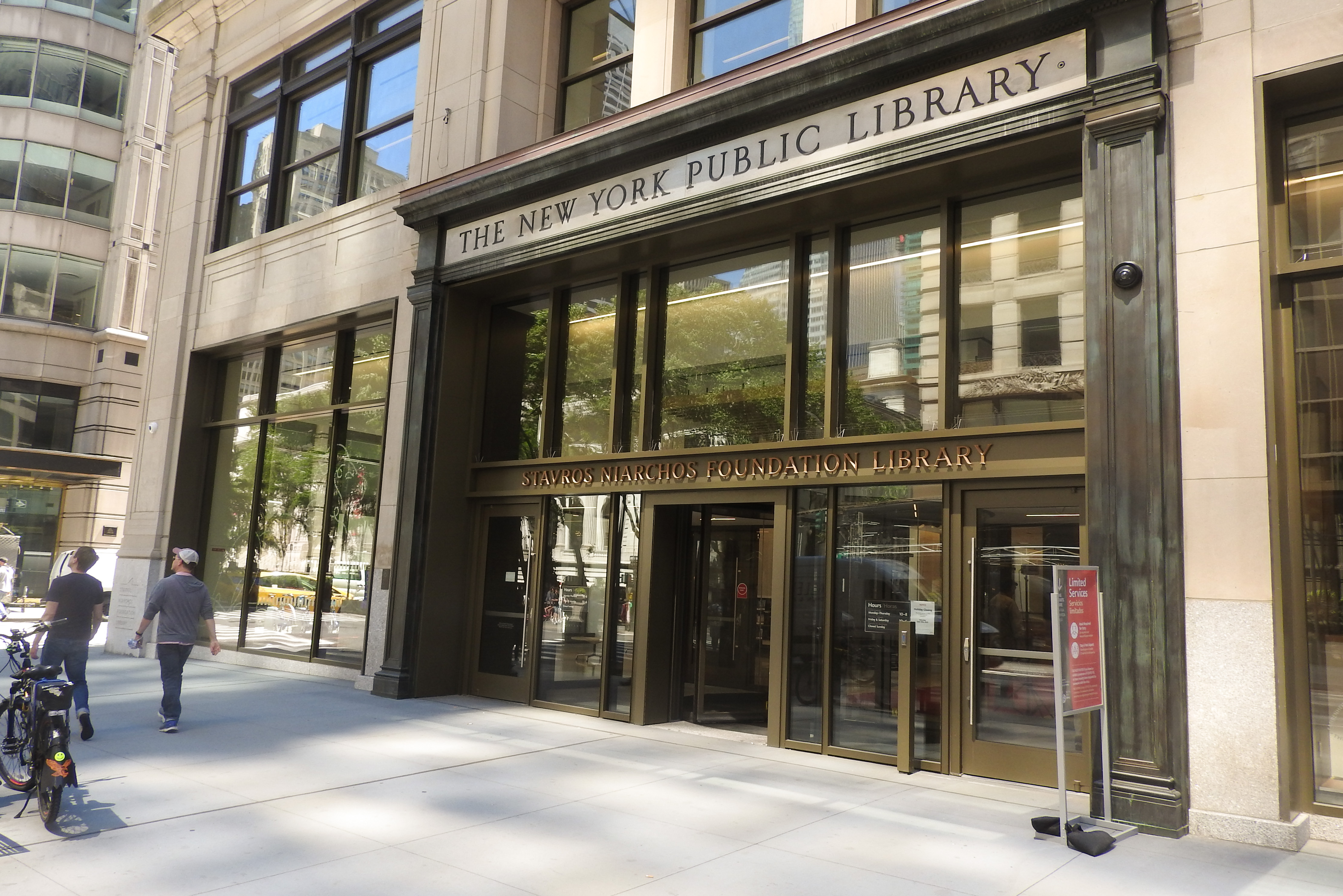
Open in 2021

The Stavros Niarchos Foundation donated $55 million to the branch's renovation in September 2017, shortly after the branch's closure. The NYPL announced that the Mid-Manhattan Library would be renamed after the foundation, becoming known as the SNFL. According to a NYPL press release, the donation was the second-largest in the NYPL's history, behind Stephen A. Schwarzman's 2008 gift of $100 million for the Main Branch's renovation. The remainder of the renovation would be paid using city funds. The SNFL was originally scheduled to reopen in January 2020, then in May 2020. However, the entire NYPL system was shuttered in March 2020 during the COVID-19 pandemic in New York City. The NYPL subsequently announced that the Stavros Niarchos Foundation Library would reopen in July 2020 for book pick-ups and drop-offs only.

The branch's first floor opened for pick-up and drop-off service on July 13, 2020, with a larger opening planned later that year. The sixth-floor library was renamed the Pasculano Learning Center in March 2021 after Richard and Lynne Pasculano donated $15 million to the NYPL. The SNFL officially opened for full service on June 1, 2021; the Pasculano Learning Center remained closed until that September, and there were strict capacity limits for the rooftop pavilion. Justin Davidson wrote for Curbed that "books have a home in plain view and within reach" in the SNFL, a contrast to the stacks of the main branch. According to James S. Russell of The New York Times, the renovated library "delights book obsessives but also offers lines of computers atop long tables and a dizzying array of" services.

== See also ==
- List of New York Public Library branches
