= Science, Industry and Business Library =

Former research library in Manhattan, New York

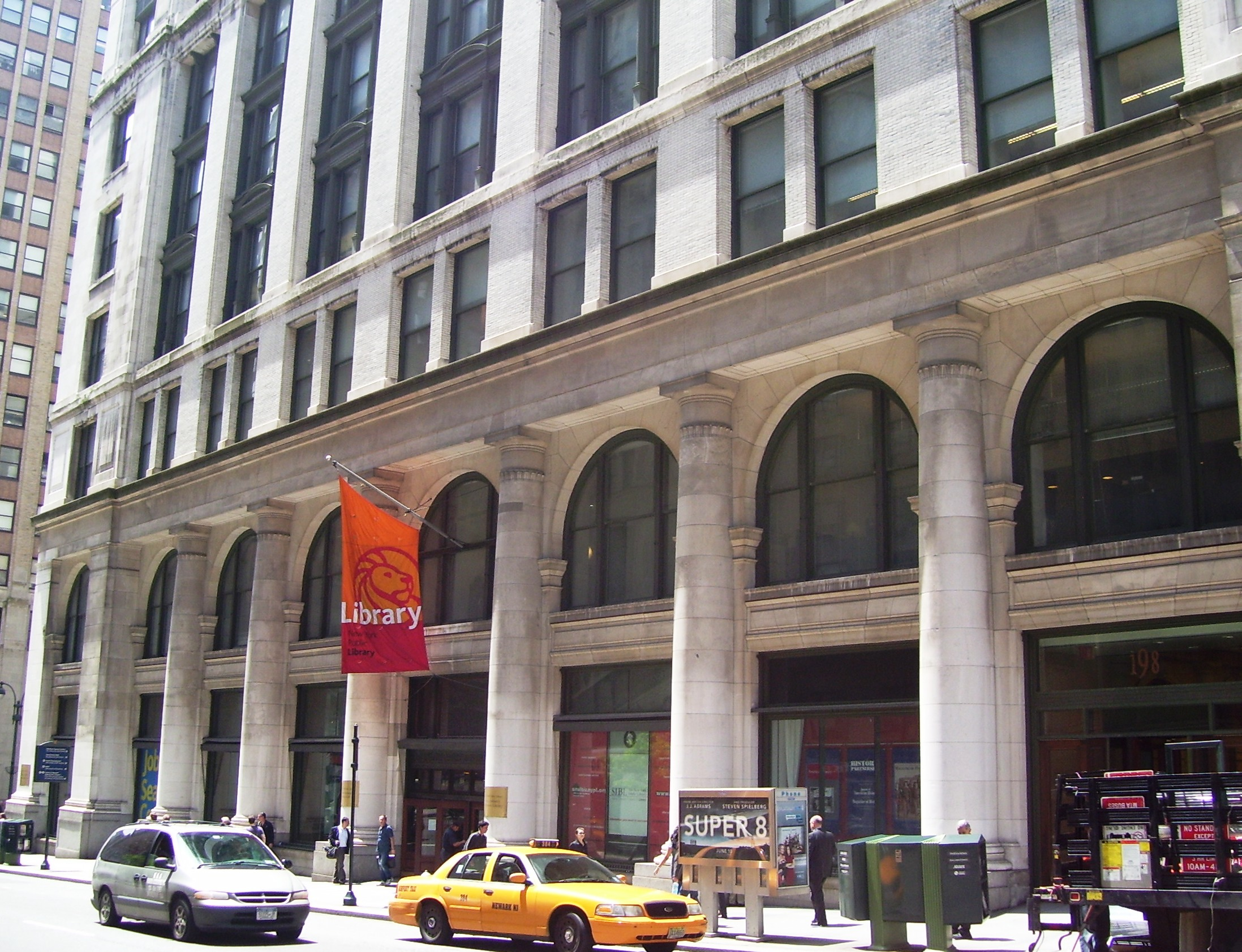
- NYPL Science, Industry and Business Library at the B. Altman and Company Building
- 40.7481°N 73.9831°W
- Location: New York City, US, United States
- Type: Research library
- Established: 1996
- Dissolved: 2020
- Branch of: New York Public Library system

Other information
- Website: Official website

The Science, Industry and Business Library (SIBL) was a research library of the New York Public Library (NYPL) system in Midtown Manhattan. SIBL was created in 1996 when materials relating to science, business, and related fields were relocated from the Main Building (now the Stephen A. Schwarzman Building) to a new branch was located within the former B. Altman and Company Building. The SIBL branch entrance was on Madison Avenue between 34th and 35th Streets. The branch consisted of space on two levels: street level and one level below ground.

In 2016, the NYPL announced that the SIBL would close after the completion of an upcoming renovation of the Mid-Manhattan Library. The Mid-Manhattan Library, which reopened in 2020 as the Stavros Niarchos Foundation Library, contains a business center that replaces the SIBL's collection.
