= Melinda Beck =

American nutritionist and academic

Melinda Beck (nutritionist)
- Born: Melinda Annetta Beck
- Education: University of California, Berkeley; California Polytechnic University; Ohio State University
- Scientific career
- Workplaces: University of North Carolina; University of Nebraska Omaha
- Thesis: Regulation of cell-mediated immunity during reinfection with influenza virus (1987)
- Website: onlinemph.unc.edu/about/faculty/melinda-beck

Melinda Annetta Beck is an American nutritionist and professor at the Gillings School of Global Public Health at the University of North Carolina at Chapel Hill where she also serves as interim department chair. Her research investigates the relationship between nutrition and immune response to infectious disease. She was elected Fellow of the American Association for the Advancement of Science in 2022.

== Early life and education ==
Beck studied zoology at the University of California, Berkeley. She moved to the California Polytechnic State University for her master's degree in biological sciences. Her graduate dissertation developed an immunofluorescent test to detect Gardnerella vaginalis. She then moved to Ohio State University, where she studied cell-mediated immunity during re-infection with influenza and received a PhD in medical microbiology and immunology.

== Research and career ==
After her PhD, Beck was a postdoctoral researcher at the University of Nebraska Omaha. Beck joined the faculty at the University of North Carolina at Chapel Hill in 1992. She was awarded a Fellowship in the Frank Porter Graham Child Development Center. She was made associate professor in 1998, full professor in 2004 and department chair in 2022.

Beck studies the relationships between host nutrition and how the immune system responds to infectious disease. In particular, she has studied how obesity impacts response to influenza, and the mechanisms that impact adult response to flu vaccines. She has shown that following influenza infection, obese mice have a higher mortality rate than their lean counterparts, and that obese individuals do not sustain anti-flu antibodies. She showed that deficiency in antioxidant nutrients can give rise to viral mutations that make viruses pathogenic. Her research was the first to show that nutritional deficiency in the host can permit a non-virulent virus to become virulent, indicting that the nutritional status of the host can drive infection.

=== Awards and honors ===
- 2001 E.L.R. Stockstad Award
- 2023 Elected Fellow of the American Association for the Advancement of Science

=== Selected publications ===
- Obesity is associated with impaired immune response to influenza vaccination in humans
- Selenium deficiency and viral infection
- Individuals with obesity and COVID-19: A global perspective on the epidemiology and biological relationships
