= Yolanda Cuomo =

American artist, educator, and art director

- Born: Yolanda Cuomo; June 7, 1957; Jersey City, New Jersey
- Known for: Art director/designer
- Spouse: Joseph McLaughlin (2 children)

Yolanda Cuomo (born June 7, 1957) is an American artist, educator, and art director known for her collaborations and intuitive design work with visual and performing artists, including Richard Avedon, the estate of Diane Arbus, Paul Simon, Laurie Anderson, Twyla Tharp, Laurie Simmons, Donna Ferrato, Larry Fink, Philip-Lorca diCorcia, Sylvia Plachy, Gilles Peress, John Cohen, Paolo Pellegrin, Peter van Agtmael, Andrew Moore, and the estate of Al Taylor. Since the mid-1980s Cuomo has often collaborated on books and exhibitions with the Magnum Photos agency and Aperture.

Cuomo is the recipient of numerous awards, including the International Center of Photography’s Infinity Award in 1991, 1995, and 2004, and the National Magazine Award, in 2004, from the American Society of Magazine Editors (ASME) for her art direction of Aperture.

== Early life ==
Yolanda Cuomo was born in Jersey City, New Jersey, and was raised in West New York, New Jersey, by John Cuomo and Rosa DeGennaro, both Italian immigrants. DeGennaro took Yolanda to Saturday morning art classes when she was in the third grade. She attended Saint Joseph of the Palisades High School.

Yolanda began college at Montclair State University, where she studied fine art, before transferring to Cooper Union. At Cooper Union, Cuomo focused her fine art practice by working with the filmmaker Robert Breer and her practice in conceptual art with sculptor Hans Haacke.

== Early career ==
After graduating from Cooper Union, Cuomo began working as an Assistant Designer at Mademoiselle magazine in 1980. Mademoiselle’s Art Director, Paula Greif, introduced Cuomo to Marvin Israel, who took an interest in the young designer. In their first work together, Israel and Cuomo designed a poster celebrating the visionary work of Alexey Brodovitch for a retrospective exhibition in Paris at the Grand Palais. Israel hired Cuomo as the Art Director of the Movies magazine where she began working with many of the photographers who would later shape her career. Through Israel, Cuomo had her first opportunities to work with Richard Avedon, Gilles Peress, Deborah Turbeville, Sylvia Plachy, Hiro, and Neil Selkirk, among others.

In 1983, while working at the Movies, Cuomo was asked by Laurie Simmons to design a book of her photographs from the series In and Around the House. In the early 1980s, Cuomo was the Associate Art Director at Vanity Fair, working closely with Alexander Liberman. At the same time, Avedon soon hired Cuomo to art-direct advertising campaigns for Christian Dior, Coco Chanel, and Calvin Klein. Later, Cuomo would collaborate with Avedon, Israel, and the dancer-choreographer Twyla Tharp, on a poster for Twyla Tharp Dance at the Brooklyn Academy of Music. Cuomo’s mentor, Marvin Israel, died in May 1984 while working on Richard Avedon’s exhibition of In the American West in Dallas.

In 1985 the Village Voice hired Cuomo as the Art Director for VUE (called View for the first issue), their new fashion magazine. During VUE’s short life of six issues, Cuomo hired photographers, including Nan Goldin, Larry Fink, Philip-Lorca diCorcia, Gilles Peress, Richard Corman, Amy Arbus, Michael Spano, Lynn Davis, Ellen Carey, Jeremiah Dine, William Wegman, and Sylvia Plachy, to photograph fashion spreads. While on assignment for VUE, photographers were given total creative freedom. For one assignment, Nan Goldin photographed a pregnant female body builder at a Russian bath in New York City’s East Village. The image was eventually included in Goldin’s book The Ballad of Sexual Dependency. VUE’s unconventional approach to fashion content was polarizing, which earned praise but also scorn. Radio personality Howard Stern called VUE "disgusting" after seeing Goldin’s photographs. David Schneiderman, publisher and editor-in-chief of the Voice, said, "An executive from one major store, whose goods grace another model in the spread, found the ladies in lace 'shocking'... I knew the magazine would be controversial, but we've built a profitable business here in the last thirty years being controversial." In fall 1986, the Village Voice dissolved VUE.

== Career and artistic practice ==
Toward the end of 1986 Cuomo founded her own studio, Yolanda Cuomo Design, on Lafayette Street. During this time, Cuomo continued working with Richard Avedon as art director for a Revlon ad campaign. The new studio’s first commercial project was a collaboration with Laurie Simmons. Together they produced Waterballet/Family Collision, bound with a lenticular 3D cover. The book was designed to be “spit-proof” because Simmons’s daughter, Lena Dunham, had just been born. The studio’s next project involved the design of a slipcase for a book of Andy Warhol’s cat drawings. Geraldine Stutz, who had helped launch Warhol’s career while Vice President at I. Miller Shoes, asked Cuomo to design a book of pre-Pop Warhol drawings and ephemera. Pre Pop Warhol was published by Stutz’s imprint at Random House, Panache Press, winning the Art Directors Club’s 68th annual award for best book of the year.

In 1987 Cuomo was hired as the creative consultant for Parents (1989), a black comedy horror film set in the 1950s suburban America, directed by Bob Balaban and written by Christopher Hawthorne. Cuomo researched and designed the sets and titles, hiring Philip-Lorca diCorcia to photograph the sets. The film opened to mediocre reviews and poor box office attendance, however, reviewers took note of the production’s attention to detail. In the New York Times, Caryn James remarked on the film’s “authentically garish costumes and sets.”

Around the same time, Cuomo began collaborating with the photographer Sylvia Plachy on the design for what would become Sylvia Plachy’s Unguided Tour. Published in 1990, the book includes photographs from Plachy’s assignments and travels as well as a vinyl record soundtrack by Tom Waits. It won the International Center of Photography’s Infinity Award for best publication in 1991.

In 1988 Cuomo began sharing a studio building on West 19th Street with the photographer and master printer Neil Selkirk. Selkirk and Cuomo met through Marvin Israel while Cuomo was at the Movies. Selkirk and Cuomo would collaborate for the next twenty-five years on many projects and productions, including the books Infra-Apparel (1993), 1000 on 42nd Street (2000), See No Evil (2006), and Lobbyists (2007); the film Who Is Marvin Israel (2005) and ongoing collaborations with the estate of Diane Arbus. Selkirk is the only person ever authorized to make posthumous prints of the work of Diane Arbus.

In the late 1980s Paul Simon called Avedon because he needed someone who knew about photographs. Avedon introduced Simon to Cuomo, who began working with him on the art direction and design of his album, The Rhythm of the Saints (1990). After searching the archives of Magnum Photos, Cuomo designed the packaging, using photographs by Miguel Rio Branco for the front cover and René Burri for the back cover. Upon its release, The Rhythm of the Saints was an enormous commercial success, selling more than two million copies and going double platinum in the United States, platinum in the United Kingdom and Canada, and earning two Grammy nominations.

Cuomo’s work with Paul Simon led to collaborations with Laurie Anderson on the albums Bright Red (1994) and The Ugly One with the Jewels (1995) as well as producing promotional materials for the Songs and Stories from Moby Dick performances. Anderson was the first person to suggest that Cuomo begin designing with computers. Anderson sat Cuomo down in front of windows with a view of the Hudson River and played music while Cuomo looked through her image archives. Anderson’s music served as the catalyst for Cuomo’s designs.

In the early 1990s, Cuomo again collaborated with Twyla Tharp, this time designing Push Comes to Shove: An Autobiography (1992). Titled after Tharp’s 1976 dance work of the same name, Push Comes to Shove features many photographs by Richard Avedon, Martha Swope, James Klosty, and Lois Greenfield, among others, in addition to numerous posters designed by Israel and Cuomo.

=== Work with Aperture Foundation ===
In 1992 Melissa Harris became the principal editor of Aperture magazine, ushering in more than two decades of collaboration on the magazine, as well as books and exhibitions. Harris and Cuomo had first worked together on Jean Pigozzi’s A Short Visit to Planet Earth (1991), a book of photographs that Mick Jagger wrote, “shows us an inside view of the world of flesh, food, celebrities, and dogs that most paparazzi can only dream about. . . He has recorded moments of my life that I was barely aware were happening, usually with great humor.”

Harris and Cuomo collaboratively produced numerous monographs, including Sylvia Plachy’s Goings On About Town and Self Portrait with Cows Going Home; Nick Nichols’s Earth to Sky; Donna Ferrato’s Love and Lust; Dona Ann McAdams’s Caught in the Act; Dario Fo’s Artful Laughter; Luca Babini’s Francesco Clemente: A Portrait; Luigi Ghirri’s It’s Beautiful Here, Isn’t It . . .; and Letizia Battaglia’s Photographs of Sicily.

In 2008, Harris and Cuomo collaborated on Josef Koudelka’s exhibition “Invasion 68 Prague” which opened at Aperture Gallery to mark the fortieth anniversary of the invasion that ended the Prague Spring. The exhibition featured more than seventy large black and white photographic prints, as well as posters from that era. In August 1968, Koudelka waded into the streets documenting Prague’s turmoil as Soviet tanks overran the city. Koudelka’s negatives were smuggled out of the country, eventually distributed by Magnum Photos under the pseudonym “unknown Czech photographer” for the next sixteen years. Koudelka personally selected the images for the exhibition from his archive. The show later traveled to Washington, D.C.; Mexico City, Mexico; Hamilton, NY; Miami, FL; Buenos Aires, Argentina; Tokyo, Japan; Moscow, Russia; Charlottesville, VA; and São Paulo, Brazil.

In addition to these book and exhibition projects, Cuomo art-directed more than thirty issues of Aperture magazine between 1992 and 2002.

=== Diane Arbus: Untitled, Revelations, The Libraries, A Chronology ===
In the early 1990s Cuomo began what has thus far been a two-decade-long collaboration with Doon Arbus on books and exhibitions of the photographs of Diane Arbus. Cuomo and Doon Arbus, Diane Arbus’s elder daughter, assembled Untitled (1995), the third volume of Arbus’s work and the only one devoted to a single project, from contact sheets of previously unpublished photographs taken at residences for the intellectually disabled between 1969 and 1971. Untitled was not only an exposé of unknown photographs with a common throughline, but was meant to encourage a more complicated assessment of Arbus’s work.

Starting in 1999 Cuomo and Doon Arbus studied Diane Arbus’s contact sheets and prints preparing for the first major retrospective since 1972 when the Museum of Modern Art in New York mounted a major posthumous exhibition accompanied by the book Diane Arbus: An Aperture Monograph, designed by Marvin Israel and Doon Arbus. Revelations (2003) was a massive, collaborative effort resulting in a book and exhibition presented by the San Francisco Museum of Modern Art; Los Angeles County Museum of Art; Museum of Fine Arts, Houston; Metropolitan Museum of Art, New York; Museum Folkwang, Essen, Germany; Victoria & Albert Museum, London; Fundació la Caixa, Barcelona; and the Walker Art Center, Minneapolis; between 2003 and 2006. The retrospective included more than two hundred photographs as well as libraries and study centers, which recreated Arbus’s darkroom, bookshelves, and documents tracing the artist’s life and trajectory. Revelations, the book, for the first time revealed the scope of Arbus’s artistic production and her life and work. Revelations includes an essay by Sandra S. Philips, senior curator of photography at the San Francisco Museum of Modern Art; “In the Darkroom,” a discussion of Arbus’s printing techniques by Neil Selkirk; a 104-page Chronology by Elisabeth Sussman, guest curator of the San Francisco Museum of Modern Art show, and Doon Arbus; and biographical entries on the photographer’s friends and colleagues by Jeff L. Rosenheim, associate curator of photographs at the Metropolitan Museum of Art.

The success of Revelations inspired the subsequent publication, The Libraries, an accordion-fold book annotating the volumes in Diane Arbus’s personal library of books, which had been recreated for the Revelations exhibition. Sussman and Doon Arbus’s text from the Revelations catalogue was subsequently published as a stand-alone volume, Diane Arbus: A Chronology (Aperture, 2011). In the fall of 2011, Cuomo’s design for Diane Arbus, a show featuring many of the same materials, traveled to four European venues sponsored by the Jeu de Paume in Paris.

=== New York September 11 by Magnum Photographers ===
On the morning of September 11, 2001, eleven members of Magnum Photos immediately dispersed from their monthly meeting in New York, documenting the day, as the events unfolded, creating a haunting photographic archive of the attacks. Within weeks, while New Yorkers were still paralyzed by the incomprehensible violence of the loss, photographer Thomas Hoepker approached PowerHouse with the images, and publisher Daniel Powers asked Cuomo to help make a book to benefit victims and their families. The team edited, designed, and produced the book in three weeks; New York September 11 was printed and bound in the United States with paper, ink, and printing donated to support the effort.

=== Here Is New York: A Democracy of Photographs ===
Here Is New York (2001) was a crowd-sourced exhibition and book of photographs spontaneously conceived and organized by Alice Rose George, Gilles Peress, Michael Shulman, and Charles Traub, in response to the attacks of September 11. Within two days of the attacks, messages and photographs taped to the window of 116 Prince Street inspired an exhibition, as Michael Shulman notes in the book’s essay, “as broad and inclusive as possible, open to ‘anybody and everybody’: not just photojournalists and other professional photographers, but bankers, rescue workers, artists and children—amateurs of every stripe.” In this spirit, Cuomo and Peress designed the book not “to showcase the ‘best’ or ‘strongest’ images, but to give the most coherent sense of the whole.” The proceeds from the sale of Here Is New York were donated to the Children’s Aid Society to benefit the families of victims of the attacks.

=== Access to Life ===
Between 2007 and 2009 Cuomo curated and designed Access to Life (2009), an exhibition and book featuring the work of several Magnum photographers: Jim Goldberg, Eli Reed, Steve McCurry, Larry Towell, Jonas Bendiksen, Paolo Pellegrin, Alex Majoli, and Gilles Peress. Access to Life was a historic collaboration between the Global Fund to Fight AIDS, Tuberculosis and Malaria, and Magnum Photos, “to document the transformative effects of treatment with antiretroviral drugs against AIDS on more than thirty individuals and their families in nine countries around the world.” This combination of art, documentary, and advocacy, resulted in a book published by Aperture and an exhibition that traveled to Rome, New York, Sydney, Tokyo, Oakland, Oslo, Madrid, Paris, and Washington, D.C., to spread awareness and garner support for the Global Fund. Editions of Access to Life were presented to world leaders at the UN summit on AIDS in New York City on October 5, 2010.

=== Richard Avedon ===
After Richard Avedon’s death, Cuomo and Norma Stevens, the executive director of Avedon’s studio, poured through the breadth of his work. Together, they revisited Avedon’s negatives, books, magazines, and contact sheets to assemble two rich volumes. Avedon Fashion 1944–2000 (Abrams, 2009) surveys Avedon’s distinctly inventive, dynamic photographs of models, designers, stylists, and clothes that filled the pages of Harper’s Bazaar, Vogue, Egoiste, and The New Yorker throughout his career. The book accompanied an exhibition of the same name at the International Center of Photography in 2009. Richard Avedon: Performance (Abrams, 2008) brought together, in one volume, more than two hundred photographs of iconic artists and musicians, dancers and divas, Pop stars and performers, actors and comedians, who shaped the culture of the second half of the twentieth century. Cuomo appears throughout the 2026 documentary Avedon (film), directed by Ron Howard.

=== New York at Night ===
In 2012 Cuomo again collaborated with Norma Stevens to edit New York at Night: Photography After Dark, an anthology showcasing New York City’s nightlife through photographs by James Van Der Zee, Henri Cartier-Bresson, Diane Arbus, Elliott Erwitt, Larry Fink, Robert Frank, Gilles Peress, Weegee, and Ryan McGinley, among others. New York at Night features essays by Adam Gopnik, Vince Aletti, Patricia Marx, and Pete Hamill, and an introduction by Norma Stevens. Diverse photographs present the city that never sleeps through the lenses of great photographers across the decades who habituated venues and locales everywhere, from gin joints to Studio 54, from Harlem to the harbor. As Gopnik writes in his essay, “Urban Nocturne,” “New York shines at night very bright, and it shines, kaleidoscopically, in many different pieces.”

=== The Library of Julio Santo Domingo ===
In 2012 Cuomo was commissioned by the family of the late Julio Mario Santo Domingo, Jr. to create a book celebrating Santo Domingo’s private collection devoted to “altered states.” The resulting two-volume opus, The Library of Julio Santo Domingo, written by Peter Watts, includes photographs, posters, paintings, and objects related to drugs, erotica, the occult, revolution, and rock music. Santo Domingo’s library and archives featured more than one hundred thousand items and covered everything from drafts by Marcel Proust and Sigmund Freud to the Rolling Stones and Lenny Bruce. The bulk of Santo Domingo’s collection is on long-term loan with Harvard University, where it is being catalogued by the distinguished Houghton Library. It has been described by the Harvard Gazette as “uniquely rich even within Harvard’s enormously diverse collections.” Santo Domingo’s rock collection was donated to the Rock and Roll Hall of Fame and Museum, in Cleveland.

== The new studio ==
In January 2013, Cuomo moved her studio to the Landmark Arts Building in Chelsea. The building is shared by the Aperture Foundation, The Magnum Foundation, Peter Hujar’s Archive, and numerous galleries.

== Teaching ==
Cuomo has taught courses on graphic design and bookmaking since 1982 when she started at the School of Visual Arts. In the late 1980s, she taught graphic design at the Parsons School of Design. In the late 1990s Cuomo taught at SVA’s Graduate Photography Program. Cuomo is currently an adjunct professor of design in the Department of Photography and Imaging at New York University’s Tisch School of the Arts since 1996.

== Recognition and awards ==
Cuomo’s devotion to art and design has been repeatedly recognized. In 2013 she was profiled by the New Yorker in a short film, “Let’s Make a Book About This,” and featured on Time magazine’s LightBox in “Profile of a Curatorial Master: Yolanda Cuomo.” Cuomo’s work has also been honored by several important industry awards. She was the recipient of the prestigious National Magazine Award, in 2004, from the American Society of Magazine Editors (ASME) for her art direction of Aperture, the premier magazine for significant photography. She received Infinity Awards in the best publication category in 1991 and 2004; and for design in 1995, from the International Center of Photography. Other leading professional organizations have recognized Cuomo’s work, including the American Institute of Graphic Arts (AIGA), Society of Publication Designers (SPD), the Art Directors Club, and Magazine Publishers of America.

== Retrospective Exhibition ==
From May 22 to June 19, 2026, Officine Fotografiche in Rome, Italy hosted the first retrospective exhibition of Cuomo’s work: "A Life of Making” presenting more than 50 years of collaboration and design.

== Publications (as designer) ==
- Laurie Simmons. In and Around the House. Buffalo: CEPA Gallery, 1983. ISBN 978-0-939784-06-6
- Laurie Simmons. Water Ballet / Family Collision. Minneapolis: Walker Art Center, 1987. ISBN 0-935640-23-1
- Andy Warhol. Holy Cats by Andy Warhol's Mother. New York: Panache Press at Random House, 1987. ISBN 0701133163
- Andy Warhol. Pre-Pop Warhol. New York: Random House, 1988. ISBN 0394570154
- Boris Kochno. Christian Bérard. New York: Panache Press / Random House/ Clarkson Potter, 1989. ISBN 978-0-394570-13-6
- Sylvia Plachy. Sylvia Plachy’s Unguided Tour. New York: Aperture, 1991. ISBN 0893814318
- Ann Salwey, & Fran Bull. Mordant Rhymes for Modern Times. New York: Salwey/Bull, 1990. OCLC 25767395
- Jean Pigozzi. A Short Visit to Planet Earth. New York: Aperture Foundation, 1991. ISBN 0893814792
- Merry Foresta, Stephen Jay Gould, & Karal Ann Marling. Between Home and Heaven: Contemporary American Landscape Photography. Albuquerque: University of New Mexico Press, 1992. ISBN 9780826313645
- Twyla Tharp. Push Comes to Shove: An Autobiography. New York: Bantam, 1992. ISBN 978-0-553073-06-5
- Bruce Gilden. Facing New York. Manchester: Cornerhouse Publications, 1992. ISBN 978-0-948797-07-1
- Neil Selkirk, Richard Martin, & Harold Koda. Infra-Apparel. New York: Metropolitan Museum of Art, 1993. ISBN 9780870996764
- Maria Morris Hambourg, Pierre Apraxine, Malcolm Daniel, Jeff L. Rosenheim, & Virginia Heckert. The Waking Dream: Photography's First Century. New York: Metropolitan Museum of Art, 1993. ISBN 978-0810964273
- Gilles Peress. Farewell to Bosnia. New York: Scalo, 1994. ISBN 978-1881616221
- Anne Ehrenkranz & Baron Adolph de Meyer. A Singular Elegance : The Photographs of Baron Adolph de Meyer. San Francisco: Chronicle, 1994. ISBN 9780811808309
- Martha Stewart. Special Occasions: The Best of Martha Stewart Living. New York: Clarkson Potter, 1995. ISBN 9780848714307
- Mimmo Jodice. Mediterranean. New York: Aperture Foundation, 1995. ISBN 9780893816124
- Diane Arbus. Untitled. New York: Aperture Foundation, 1995. ISBN 9780893816230
- Lynda S. Waggoner. Falling Water: Frank Lloyd Wright's Romance with Nature. New York: Universe, 1996. ISBN 978-0789300720
- Robert Capa. Photographs. New York: Aperture, 1996. ISBN 978-0893816902
- Bruce Gilden. Haiti. Stockport: Dewi Lewis Publishing, 1996. ISBN 9781899235551
- Diane Von Furstenberg. The Table. New York: Random House, 1996. ISBN 9780679447573
- Sylvia Plachy & James Ridgeway. Red Light: Inside the Sex Industry. New York: powerHouse, 1996. ISBN 9781576870006
- Robert Boardingham. The Young Picasso. New York: Universe, 1997. ISBN 9780789300935
- Alice Rose George, ed. 25 And Under: Photographers. New York: W. W. Norton & Company, 1996. ISBN 9780393315769
- Dana Self. Intimate Landscapes: The Canyon Suite of Georgia O'Keeffe. New York: Universe, 1997. ISBN 978-0789300829
- Larry Fink. Boxing. New York: powerHouse, 1997. ISBN 978-1576870082
- Dona Ann McAdams. Caught In The Act. New York: Aperture Foundation, 1998. ISBN 9780893816803
- Michael McDonough. Malaparte: A House Like Me. New York: Aperture, 1999. ISBN 978-0609603789
- Bruce Gilden. After The Off. Stockport: Dewi Lewis Publishing, 1999. ISBN 978-1-899235-17-9
- Letizia Battaglia. Passion, Justice, Freedom: Photographs of Sicily. New York: Aperture, 1999. ISBN 978-0893818050
- Richard Corman. Glory: Photographs of Athletes. New York: William Morrow & Co, 1999. ISBN 9780688158989
- Luca Babini. Francesco Clemente: A Portrait. New York: Aperture, 1999. ISBN 9780893818722
- Neil Selkirk. 1000 On 42nd Street. New York: powerHouse, 1999. ISBN 9781576870457
- Larry Fink (photographer). Runway. New York: powerHouse, 2000. ISBN 9781576870273
- Eddie Adams, Kerry Kennedy Cuomo, & Nan Richardson. Speak Truth To Power. New York: Crown, 2000. ISBN 9780812930627
- Jane Evelyn Atwood. Too Much Time: Women In Prison. New York: Phaidon, 2000. ISBN 978-0714839738
- Magnum Photos. New York September 11. New York: powerHouse, 2001. ISBN 978-1576871300
- Howard B. Rock & Deborah Dash Moore. Cityscapes: A History of New York in Images. New York: Columbia University Press, 2001. ISBN 978-0231106245
- John Cohen. There is no eye. New York: powerHouse, 2001. ISBN 978-1576871072
- Ron Jenkins. Dario Fo & Franca Rame: Artful Laughter. New York: Aperture, 2001. ISBN 978-0893819477
- Burt Glinn. Havana: El Momento Revolucionario. New York: Umbrage Editions, 2002. ISBN 9781884167096
- Starr Ockenga. Amaryllis. New York: Crown, 2002. ISBN 978-0609608814
- Magnum Photos and Robert Dannin. Arms Against Fury: Magnum Photographers in Afghanistan. New York: powerHouse, 2002. ISBN 9781576871515
- Gilles Peress, Alice Rose George, & Michael Shulan. Here Is New York: A Democracy of Photographs. New York: Scalo, 2002. ISBN 978-3908247661
- Marcel Saba. Witness Iraq: A War Journal, February - April 2003. New York: powerHouse, 2003. ISBN 978-1576872000
- Diane Arbus. Revelations. New York: Random House, 2003. ISBN 978-0375506208
- Max Kozloff & Magnum Photos. New Yorkers: As Seen by Magnum Photographers. New York: powerHouse, 2003. ISBN 9781576871850
- Kenneth Cole. Footnotes: What You Stand For Is More Important Than What You Stand In. New York: Simon & Schuster, 2003. ISBN 978-0743241779
- Larry Schwarm. On Fire. Durham: Duke University, 2004. ISBN 9780822332084
- Dan Zanes. Hello Hello. New York: Little, Brown Books for Young Readers, 2004. ISBN 978-0316168083
- Diane Arbus. The Libraries. San Francisco: Fraenkel Gallery, 2004. ISBN 9781881337195
- Vincent Cianni. We Skate Hardcore: Photographs from Brooklyn's Southside. New York: NYU Press, 2004. ISBN 978-0814716427
- Michelle Fine. Echos of Brown: Youth Documenting and Performing the Legacy of Brown V. Board of Education. New York: Teachers College Press, 2004. ISBN 978-0807744970
- Donna Ferrato. Love & Lust. New York: Aperture, 2005. ISBN 9781931788335
- Michael Nichols & Mike Fay. The Last Place on Earth. Washington D.C.: National Geographic, 2005. ISBN 9780792238812
- Sylvia Plachy. Self Portrait with Cows Going Home. New York: Aperture, 2005. ISBN 978-1931788434
- Elihu Rose. My New York. Providence: Meridian Press, 2006.
- Brandon Stosuy. Up Is Up But So Is Down: New York's Downtown Literary Scene, 1974-1992. New York: NYU Press, 2006. ISBN 9780814740118
- Zainab Salbi. The Other Side of War: Women's Stories of Survival and Hope. Washington D.C.: National Geographic, 2006. ISBN 9780792262114
- Neil Selkirk. See No Evil. Portland: Nazraeli Press, 2006. ISBN 9781590051382
- Neil Selkirk. Lobbyists. Portland: Nazraeli Press, 2006. ISBN 9781590051696
- Danny Wilcox Frazier. Driftless: Photographs from Iowa. Durham: Duke University, 2007. ISBN 9780822341451
- Diana Walker. The Bigger Picture: 30 Years of Portraits. Washington D.C.: National Geographic, 2007. ISBN 142620129X
- Alen MacWeeney. Irish Travelers: Tinkers no more. Henniker: New England College Press, 2007. ISBN 9780979013003
- Sylvia Plachy. Goings On About Town: Photographs For The New Yorker. New York: Aperture/The New Yorker, 2007. ISBN 978-1597110518
- Luigi Ghirri. Luigi Ghirri: It's Beautiful Here, Isn't It... New York: Aperture, 2008. ISBN 978-1597110587
- Richard Corman. Prep: The Spirit of a High School Football Team. New York: powerHouse, 2008. ISBN 1576874583
- Richard Avedon. Performance: Richard Avedon. New York: Abrams Books, 2008. ISBN 978-0810972889
- Jennette Williams. The Bathers. Durham: Duke University, 2009. ISBN 978-0-8223-4623-4
- Richard Avedon. Avedon Fashion 1944-2000. New York: Abrams Books, 2009. ISBN 978-0810983892
- Desmond Tutu, Jeffrey Sachs, & Magnum Photos. Access to Life. New York: Aperture/Magnum Photos/The Global Fund, 2009. ISBN 978-1597111058
- Andrew Moore. Detroit Disassembled. Bologna: Damiani, 2010. ISBN 978-8862081184
- Diane Arbus, Doon Arbus, Jeff Rosenheim, & Elisabeth Sussman. Diane Arbus: A Chronology. New York: Aperture, 2011. ISBN 978-1597111799
- Paolo Pellegrin. Dies Irae. Rome: Contrasto, 2011. ISBN 9788869651793
- Frances Torres. Memory Remains: 9/11 Artifacts at Hangar 17. Washington D.C.: National Geographic, 2011. ISBN 1426208332
- Benjamin Lowy. Iraq | Perspectives. Durham: Duke University, 2011. ISBN 978-0822351665
- Tria Giovan. Sand Sea Sky: The Beaches of Sagaponack. Bologna: Damiani, 2012. ISBN 978-8862081962
- Paolo Pellegrin. Paolo Pellegrin. New York: Magnum Photos, 2012.
- Lekha Singh. Pop-Up Pianos. Bologna: Damiani, 2012. ISBN 9788862082334
- Charles Harbutt. Departures and Arrivals. Bologna: Damiani, 2012. ISBN 9788862082433
- David Gulden. The Centre Cannot Hold. New York: Glitterati Incorporated, 2012. ISBN 9780983270287
- Yolanda Cuomo & Norma Stevens. New York At Night: Photography After Dark. New York: powerHouse, 2012. ISBN 978-1576876169
- Andrew Moore. Cuba. Bologna: Damiani, 2012. ISBN 9788862082525
- Zainab Salbi & Rennio Maifredi. If You Knew Me You Would Care. New York: powerHouse, 2013. ISBN 978-1576876190
- Alice M. Greenwald & Clifford Chanin, eds. The Stories They Tell. New York: Skira/Rizzoli, 2013. ISBN 978-0847841332
- Sandra Nunnerley. Interiors. New York: powerHouse, 2013. ISBN 978-1576876695
- Gerard H. Gaskin. Legendary: Inside the House Ballroom Scene. Durham: Duke University, 2013. ISBN 978-0-8223-5582-3
- Richard Corman. Madonna NYC 83. Bologna: Damiani, 2013. ISBN 9788862082884
- Michael Nichols. Earth To Sky. New York: Aperture, 2013. ISBN 978-1597112437
- Timothy Phillips. Beyond Conflict: 20 Years of Putting Experience to Work for Peace. Cambridgeshire: Brideswell Books, 2013. ISBN 978-0615790572
- Yolanda Cuomo & Peter Watts, eds. The Library Of Julio Santo Domingo. New York: Paper Cinema, 2013.
- Al Taylor. Pass The Peas And Cans Studys. New York: Steidl/Zwirner, 2014. ISBN 978-3869307152
- Peter van Agtmael. Disco Night Sept. 11. New York: Red Hook Editions, 2014. ISBN 978-0984195428
- Deborah Feingold. Music. Bologna: Damiani, 2014. ISBN 9788862083119
- Diana Walker. Hillary: The Photographs of Diana Walker. New York: Simon & Schuster, 2014. ISBN 978-1476763378
- Norma I. Quintana. Circus: A Traveling Life. Bologna: Damiani, 2014. ISBN 9788862083652
- James Klosty. John Cage Was. Middletown: Wesleyan, 2014. ISBN 978-0819575043
- Andrew Moore. Dirt Meridian. Bologna: Damiani, 2015. ISBN 978-8862084123
- Nadia Sablin. Aunties: The seven summers of Alevtina and Ludmila. Duke University Press Books, 2015. ISBN 978-0822360476
- Richard Corman. Misty Copeland: Power and Grace. Michael Friedman Group, 2015. ISBN 978-0692493236
- Gillian Laub. Southern Rites. Bologna: Damiani, 2015. ISBN 978-8862084130
- Lynn Saville. Dark City. Bologna: Damiani, 2015. ISBN 978-8862084116
- Susan Meiselas. Women of York: Shared Dining. 2015
- Paolo Pellegrin & Alex Majoli. Congo. Aperture, 2015. ISBN 978-1597113250
- Mary Ellen Mark. Tiny, Streetwise Revisited. Aperture, 2015. ISBN 978-1597112628
- Joan Liftin. Marseille. Bologna: Damiani, 2015. ISBN 978-8862084499
- Annie Kelly and Tim Street-Porter. Casa Mexico: At Home in Merida and the Yucatan. Rizzoli, 2016. ISBN 978-0847848263
- Stephanie Berger. Merce Cunningham. Beyond the Perfect Stage. Photographs by Stephanie Berger. Bologna: Damiani, 2016. ISBN 978-8862084659
- Landon Nordeman. Out of Fashion. Bologna: Damiani, 2016. ISBN 978-8862084963
- Al Taylor. Pet Stains, Puddles, and Full Gospel Neckless. David Zwirner Books, 2016. ISBN 978-1941701126
- Alice Mc Greenwald. No Day Shall Erase You: The Story of 9/11 as Told at the September 11 Museum. Skira Rizzoli, 2016. ISBN 978-0847849475
- John Rowe. Omo Valley. IBS, 2016
- Jean Pigozzi. Pool Party. Rizzoli, 2016. ISBN 978-0847849161
- Steve McCurry. On Reading. Phaidon, 2016. ISBN 978-0714871295
- David Allee. Night Lights. 2017
- Barry Blitt. Blitt. Riverhead Books, 2017. ISBN 978-0399576669
- James Moore. Photographs 1962-2006. Bologna: Damiani, 2017. ISBN 978-8862084949
- Al Taylor. Early Paintings. David Zwirner Books, 2017. ISBN 978-1941701584
- Melissa Harris. A wild life. Aperture, 2017. ISBN 978-1597112512
- Ruth Kaplan. Bathers. Damiani, 2017. ISBN 978-8862085489
- Tria Giovan. The Cuba Archive. Damiani, 2017. ISBN 978-8862085458
- Johnny Pigozzi: ME + CO. Damiani, 2017. ISBN 978-8862085502
- Pete Souza. Obama: An Intimate Portrait. Little, Brown and Company, 2017. ISBN 978-0316512589
- Peter Watts and Yolanda Cuomo. Altered States: The Library of Julio Santo Domingo. Anthology Editions, 2017. ISBN 978-1944860-15-8
- Jean Pigozzi. Charles and Saatchi, The Dogs. Damiani, 2017. ISBN 9788862085922
- Jean Pagliuso. In Plain Sight. Damiani, 2018. ISBN 978-8862085786
- Joan Liftin. Water For Tears. Damiani, 2018. ISBN 9788862085960
- James Klosty. Greece 66. Damiani, 2018. ISBN 9788862086059
- Sylvia Plachy. When Will It Be Tomorrow. Robert Capa Contemporary Photography Center, 2018.
- Edward Keating. Main Street: The Lost Dream of Route 66. Damiani, 2018. ISBN 9788862086004
- Rachel Cobb. Mistral: The Legendary Wind of Province. Damiani, 2018. ISBN 9788862086189
- Pete Souza. Shade: A Tale of Two Presidents. Little, Brown and Company, 2018. ISBN 9780316421836
- Jerry Schatzberg. Dylan by Schatzberg. ACC Art Books, 2018. ISBN 9781851498932
- Steve McCurry. Steve McCurry: Una Vita Per Immagini. Mondadori Electa, 2018. ISBN 9781786272355
- Germano Celant. Paolo Pellegrin by Germano Celant. Silvana Editoriale, 2018. ISBN 9788836641093
- Al Taylor. What Are You Looking At?. High Museum of Art, Atlanta, 2018.
- Joey Lawrence. We Came From Fire: Photographs of Kurdistan’s Armed Struggle Against ISIS. powerHouse Books, 2019. ISBN 9781576878682
- Fran Bull. Fran Bull / (choose your own title). Damiani, 2019. ISBN 978-88-6208-651-6
- Estee Stanley. In Comfort and Style. Rizzoli, 2019. ISBN 978-0-8478-6533-8
- John Cohen. Speed Bumps on a Dirt Road. powerHouse Books, 2019. ISBN 978-1-57687-926-9
- Andrew Moore. Blue Alabama. Damiani, 2019. ISBN 978-88-6208-654-7
- James Klosty. Merce Cunningham Redux. powerHouse Books, 2019. ISBN 978-1-57687-942-9
- Pete Souza. Shade: Updated Edition. Little, Brown and Company, 2019. ISBN 978-0-316-45821-4
- Jeremiah Dine. Daydreams Walking. Damiani, 2019. ISBN 978-88-6208-697-4
- Annie Kelly. Living in Paradise. Rizzoli, 2020. ISBN 978-0-8478-6585-7
- Susan Meiselas. Tar Beach: Life on the Rooftops of Little Italy. Damiani, 2020. ISBN 978-88-6208-722-3
- David Gulden. Nor Dread Nor Hope Attend / Photographs from the Plains of Africa. Damiani, 2020. ISBN 978-88-6208-719-3
- Pierce & Ward. A Tale of Interiors. New York, Rizzoli, 2020. ISBN 978-0-8478-6383-9
- Meryanne Loum-Martin. Inside Marrakesh: Enchanting Homes and Gardens. Rizzoli, 2020. ISBN 978-0-8478-6427-0
- Michael Nichols. Wild. Edition Lammerhuber, 2020. ISBN 978-3-903101-75-3
- Jean Pigozzi. The 213 Most Important Men in My Life. Damiani, 2021. ISBN 8862086717
- Grumeti Fund. A Conservation Story. EBS, 2020.
- Nola Anderson. Immersion: Living and Learning in an Olmsted Garden. Damiani, 2021. ISBN 9788862087391
- David Owen. The Loeb House. Self Published, 2021.
- Matt Black (photographer). American Geography: A Reckoning with a Dream. Thames & Hudson, 2021. ISBN 978-0-500-54535-5
- John Dolan. The Perfect Imperfect: The Wedding Photographs of John Dolan. Damiani, 2021. ISBN 9788862087452
- Gilles Peress. Whatever You Say, Say Nothing. Steidl, 2021. ISBN 978-3-95829-544-5
- Jennifer Herman. Dov’s Big Art Book. Self Published, 2022.
- Gary S. Berger, MD & Michael Diruggiero. Einstein: The Man and His Mind. Damiani, 2022. ISBN 9788862087841
- Jane Olson. World Citizen: Journeys of a Humanitarian. Meridian, 2022. ISBN 978-1-5136-9569-3
- Pete Souza. The West Wing and Beyond: What I Saw Inside the Presidency. Little, Brown and Company, 2022. ISBN 978-0-316-38337-0
- Thomas Kligerman. Shingle and Stone: Thomas Kligerman Houses. Monacelli, 2022. ISBN 9781580936040
- Diane Arbus. Diane Arbus Documents. David Zwirner Books and Fraenkel Gallery, 2022. ISBN 978-1-64423-065-7
- Cheryl Finley & Deborah Willis. Free as they want to be: Artists Committed to Memory. Damiani, 2022. ISBN 978-88-6208-780-3
- Steve McCurry. Stories & Dreams: Portraits of Childhood. Mondadori, 2021. ISBN 978-1399600217
- Lou Reed. The Art of the Straight Line: My Tai Chi. HarperOne, 2023. ISBN 978-0-06-309353-9
- Nicki Germaine. Springsteen: Liberty Hall. Nicki Germaine, 2022. ISBN 979-8-218-07261-2
- Tria Giovan. Loisaida: New York Street Work 1984-1990. Damiani, 2024. ISBN 978-88-6208-787-2
- Magnum Photos. Magnum America: The United States. Thames & Hudson, 2024. ISBN 978-0-500-54456-3
- Larry Fink. Hands On: A Passionate Life of Looking. Powerhouse Books, 2024. ISBN 978-1-64823-046-2
- E. A. Kahane. Come Join The Parade!! Self Published, 2024. ISBN 979-8-218-46095-2
- Matt Black (photographer). American Artifacts. Thames & Hudson, 2024. ISBN 978-0-500-02775-2
- Dan McCarthy. Dan McCarthy: Freedom. Rizzoli Electra, 2024. ISBN 978-0-8478-3686-4
- Steve McCarthy. Devotion. Mondadori, 2023. ISBN 978-3-7913-8012-4
- Y Combinator. Y Combinator. Self Published, 2024.
- Larry McCafffrey. Twenty-Five Books. Artist Books from the Collection of Larry McCaffrey. Self Published, 2025.
- Sergio Bianchi. Luigi Pellegrin: Copying Saturn. Letter Twenty-Two, 2025. ISBN 979-12-5644-124-2
- Phillip Leonian. Man In Motion. The Leonian Charitable Trust, 2025 ISBN 979-8-218-67257-7
- Thomas A. Kligerman. Summer by the Sea Cottages from Watch Hill to Little Compton Photographs By: Read McKendree. The Monacelli Press, 2026. ISBN 978-1-58093-734-4
- John Baer. John Baer The Extraordinary Ordinary / A Memoir In Photographs 1945-1954. Paper Cinema Editions / John Baer Archive, 2025. ISBN 979-8-218-78111-8
- Jeremiah Dine. Anne-Marie. Steidl, 2026 ISBN 978-3-96999-495-5
- Susan Meiselas. No Kings: Signs Of The Times. Editorial RM, 2026. ISBN 978-84-10290-81-5
- Jean Pigozzi. Zimmermann Photographs Jean Pigozzi. Self-Published, 2026.
