= Alvin Boretz =

American screenwriter

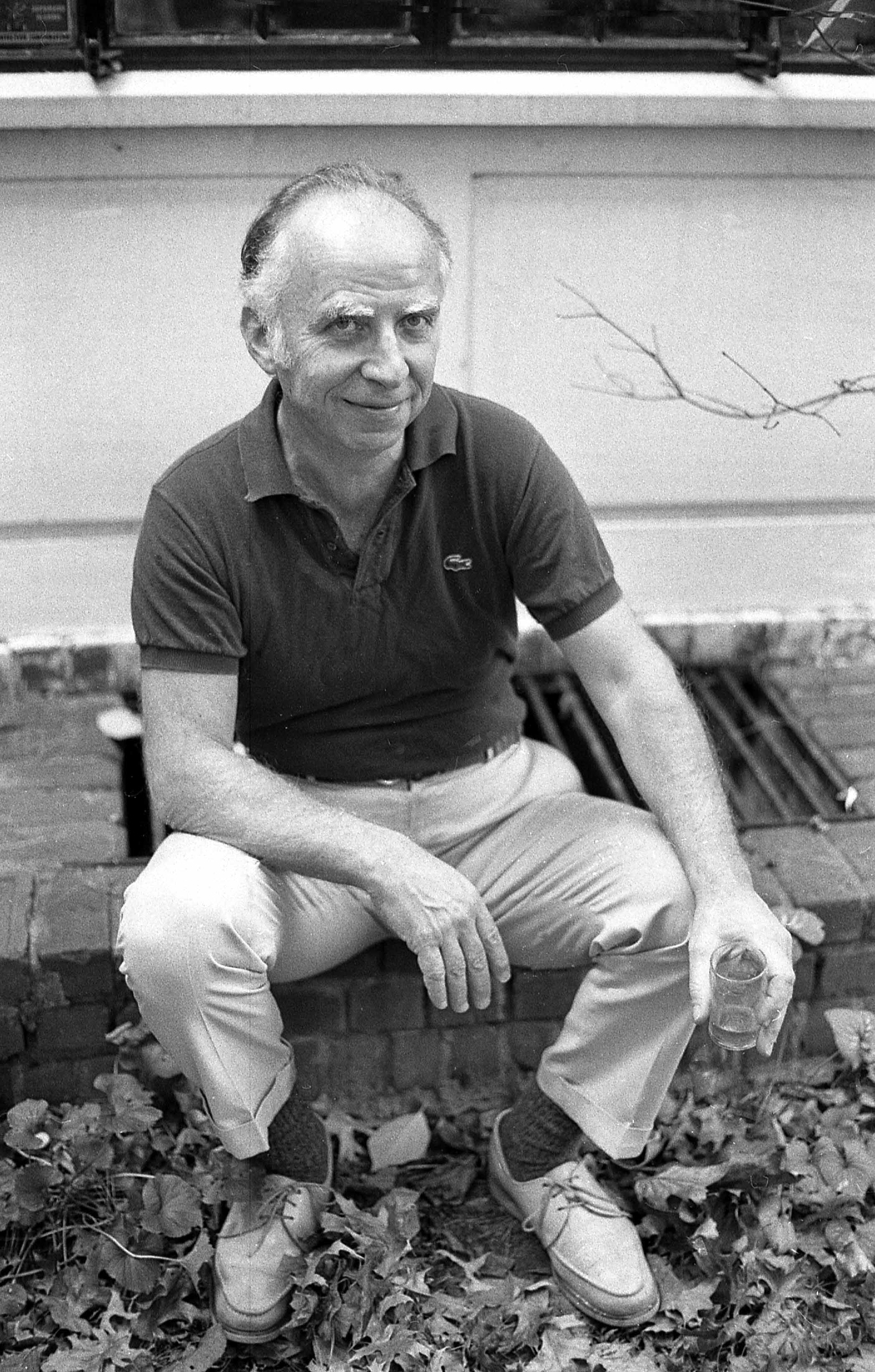
- Born: June 15, 1919; New York, New York
- Died: July 22, 2010 (aged 91); New York, New York
- Occupations: television writer playwright
- Years active: 1945–1992
- Spouse: Lucille Garson Boretz
- Children: 2, including Carrie Boretz

Alvin Boretz (June 15, 1919 – July 22, 2010) was an American writer for stage, screen, radio, and television. With an estimated one thousand dramatic scripts to his credit, Boretz contributed to the Golden Age of Television, leaving an enduring legacy that continues to influence contemporary storytelling in the entertainment industry.

== Early life and education ==
Boretz was born in New York City, the son of Samuel Boretz and Mollie Milch Boretz; both of his parents were immigrants from Eastern Europe. His father died in 1921; his widowed mother ran a candy store. He attended Boys High School in Brooklyn, and Brooklyn College. He married Lucille Garson, and they had two daughters. He served in the Army Air Corps during World War II.

== Career ==
=== Radio and television ===
Before television became popular, Boretz wrote for radio. In that medium, he honed his language skills and developed a flair for penning dialogue. He became known for strong character development, a feature which, with the sensitive but forthright handling of themes such as divorce, mental retardation and suicide, distinguishes Boretz's critically acclaimed work.

The comedian Lenny Bruce sent Boretz a telegram after his Armstrong Circle Theatre production of "The Desperate Season" about the averted suicide of a college professor, thanking him for "the thrilling genius and poetry that exuded from" the play. In this same Golden Age of Television his script "The Trial of Poznan" won a Harcourt Brace award for best television play of 1957 and was published in a book called Best Television Plays of 1957. His A & E 1992 one act television play I Remember You, starring Jane Seymour and Daniel J. Travanti is a story of romance and memories between an adventurous sculptor and a conservative banker. It was called a "real tour-de-force" by a critic in The Hollywood Reporter.

Boretz wrote for numerous shows including The Alcoa Hour, Armstrong Circle Theater, General Electric Theater, Playhouse 90, ABC Afterschool Special, CBS Children's Hour, and ABC Movie of the Week. He wrote numerous television scripts for such series as The Big Story, N.Y.P.D., Dr. Kildare, The Asphalt Jungle, The Defenders, Medical Center, and Kojak.

Boretz was the subject of an episode of Armstrong Circle Theater on January 24, 1956. The broadcast depicted his research about wiretapping, including his interviewing of United States Representative Emanual Celler, who headed the House Judiciary Committee's investigation of illegal wiretapping.

=== Film ===
Boretz wrote the screenplay for the 1978 film Brass Target which starred Sophia Loren and John Cassavetes. The critic Roger Ebert wrote in the Chicago Sun-Times, "What sets this movie apart is that real care was lavished on developing the characters and the script's complexities."

=== Stage ===
His stage play, "Made In America" debuted at the Mark Taper Forum in Los Angeles in 1984. The play was directed by Steven Robman and starred Brian Dennehy. The play was described as "a big play, with no scarcity of themes" by theater critic Dan Sullivan writing in the Los Angeles Times. Set in middle-class Boston, the play pivots around a blue collar, second generation Irish American who laments the deteriorating condition of his life and his country.

== Death and legacy ==
Boretz died in 2010 at the age of 91, in New York City. His entire collection of scripts, correspondence and notes is housed at the Wisconsin Center for Film and Theater Research. His daughter Carrie Boretz is a noted photographer.

== Recognition ==
Boretz's "Little Girl Lost" won Ohio State University's first prize for a half-hour documentary in 1956.
