= Phillip Leonian =

American photographer

- Born: January 13, 1927; Morgantown, West Virginia, U.S.
- Died: September 15, 2016 (aged 89); Chicago, Illinois, U.S.
- Known for: Motion photography, sports photography, advertising photography
- Spouse: Edith Rosenbaum Leonian (m. 1957)
- Website: phillipleonian.com; leonianfoundation.org; leoniancharitabletrust.org

Phillip Marshall Leonian (January 13, 1927 – September 15, 2016) was an American commercial photographer known for his images of people and objects in motion. Active from the 1950s through the 1980s, he used stroboscopic effects and motion blur to capture movement within a single frame. His multi-image photography has been compared to the works of Eadweard Muybridge and Étienne-Jules Marey.

Leonian specialized in advertising and editorial photography, and his work appeared in numerous ads and magazines, including Sports Illustrated, Newsweek, and Time. In the 1960s and 1970s, he contributed regularly to Sports Illustrated, producing cover photos of famous athletes such as Muhammad Ali and basketball player Earl “the Pearl” Monroe. Leonian's subjects also included science fiction author Isaac Asimov, boxer Joe Frazier, figure skater Janet Lynn, long-distance runner Steve Prefontaine, and Olympic gymnast Cathy Rigby. His stroboscopic photo of Rigby's balance beam routine was one of the 116 images encoded on the Voyager Golden Record.

Leonian lectured and wrote extensively on copyright, advising fellow photographers on how to retain the rights to their work. He was also an inventor who held two patents for photographic equipment.

According to art historian Kristen Gresh, the curator of photography at the Museum of Fine Arts, Boston, "Leonian's inventive techniques expanded the boundaries of still photography."

== Early life ==
Leonian was born and raised in Morgantown, West Virginia. His Armenian-born father, Leon H. Leonian (1888 – 1945), was a mycologist and professor of mycology at West Virginia University. An obituary published in Science said that Leon Leonian "established an international reputation in three distinct fields of science—plant diseases, the physiology of fungi, and plant breeding." Phil's mother, Nell, taught in the university's English department.

Leonian first took up photography while he was a student at Morgantown High School, where, as a senior, he was voted "most lazy". After graduation from high school, he served as a paratrooper in the U.S. Army Medical Corps during the Occupation of Japan.

From 1947 to 1950, he attended West Virginia University, where he studied biology and chemistry. Though he did not graduate, he later attributed his methodical and experimental approach to photography to his training in the scientific method. "Hours of calculations went into the creation of each photograph", wrote Judith Lane, who worked with Leonian and his wife for 25 years.

After leaving WVU, Leonian studied at the Brooks Institute of Photography in Santa Barbara, California. Years later, WVU's quarterly magazine called him "one of the University’s more noted dropouts."

== Career ==
After graduating from the Brooks Institute, Leonian moved to New York City, where he found a job at a color photo lab—one of the few operating in the city at that time. Working at the color lab allowed him to learn from the work of New York's pro photographers.

In the mid-1950s, Leonian got his start as a commercial photographer by doing medical reportage for Physicians News Service. His black-and-white portraits of people with chronic illnesses appeared in medical journal ads.

By the 1970s, he had developed a reputation as one of New York City's most in-demand advertising photographers, one who could command fees as high as $2,000 a day. “He makes top bucks because he is the best there is at showing people and objects in motion", wrote Norman Schreiber in The Village Voice.

Leonian's photos were published in Time, Newsweek, Essence, Look, Sports Illustrated, and World Tennis. His work also appeared in vintage photography magazines such as Popular Photography, Camera 35, Travel & Camera, and U.S. Camera and Travel (which later became Travel + Leisure).

=== Advertising photography ===
In the 1960s and 1970s, Leonian's commercial photography featured in advertisements for household consumer products such as Alka-Seltzer, Tide detergent, Hanes underwear, Purina cat food, Lucky Strike cigarettes, and Oneida tableware. His corporate clients also included AT&T, IBM, Kodak, Pepsi-Cola, Sears, Citibank, Bayer, Avis, Honeywell, Jockey, General Foods, General Motors, and General Electric.

Leonian's commercial breakthrough came in 1964, when he worked with BBDO on a series of ads for the Aqueduct Racetrack in Queens, New York. His motion-blurred photos of galloping racehorses were posted in subway stations across New York City and seen by millions of commuters. Working with BBDO again in 1966, Leonian used remote-controlled cameras to capture the chromatic fidelity of a Philco color TV set. His untouched photos were then reproduced in ads that ran in Life, Look, Reader’s Digest, The Saturday Evening Post, and TV Guide.

In 1968, AT&T used Leonian's motion photography to illustrate the inconvenience of owning only one telephone. Ads from the company's "Doubleback" campaign depicted women walking across a room or down a flight of stairs before halting and turning back to answer a ringing phone. “It was a matter of slicing time, a fourth dimension of space, and effectively recreating it on two dimensions of paper”, wrote the creative team at N.W. Ayer.

In 2025, curator Marvin Heiferman wrote that Leonian's midcentury advertising images "were widely acknowledged by peers in the business," adding that the photos' depictions of forward motion were "reflective of and influential in shaping the aesthetic of the era."

=== Sports photography ===
Leonian's fascination with capturing movement in still images led him to sports photography, and over the course of his career, he photographed tennis, speed skating, saber fencing, harness racing, Olympic track cycling, and a variety of other sports.

In 1968, he began working for Sports Illustrated. His first assignment—shooting an Olympic pentathlon—allowed him to play around with new tools and techniques, including the multiple-image effects that would become his Sports Illustrated trademark.

Within a year, he was photographing Muhammad Ali, who posed in a king's robe and crown for the magazine's May 5, 1969 cover story. Ali spent five days working out in Leonian's studio. He even sparred a bit with the photographer, who claimed to have been the first to observe some of the boxer's habits. “For example, he will not blink his eyes when the other fighter is in range,” Leonian said. “If he has to blink, he steps back. It was a totally unconscious thing with him.”

Seven of Leonian's photos were published on the cover of Sports Illustrated.

One of his most famous sporting images, 1971's Cathy Rigby on Balance Beam, was launched into outer space aboard Voyager 1 and Voyager 2. In their 1978 book Murmurs of Earth: The Voyager Interstellar Record, astronomer Carl Sagan and his colleagues wrote that they selected Leonian's photo for the interstellar time capsule because it depicts the full range of human motion in a single still image:

If this had been the only picture of a human being we sent, what a strange image of us recipients might have! But it should be clear that this is one person in movement, and it probably gives a better sense of how we move than anything else could have.

According to artist Jon Lomberg, the committee member who gathered images for the Golden Record, Rigby's fame played no role in their decision. "We showed her because she was the person who happened to be in that wonderful stroboscopic picture", Lomberg told CNN in 2020. "If it had been an unknown high school gymnast, I would still have sent that picture."

=== Personal projects ===
Some of Leonian's first forays into motion photography were studies of people walking, including Walking Man (Man in a Hurry), a 1962 photo of a businessman captured mid-stride. The man's motion-blurred legs "stretch out in an exaggerated stride, creating the illusion that both feet are off the ground", wrote Kristen Gresh, who described the still photo as "almost alive."

Leonian wrote about his early fascination with walking figures in the U.S. Camera Annual: "Walking is one of the basic human postures, the others being standing, sitting, and lying down. The last three are standard subjects throughout art history. Why not walking?" He went on to connect his multi-image photos to some of the earliest artwork made by humans:

One day, leafing through a book, I came across reproductions of paintings of cave walls in France. An artist wanting to represent an animal in motion drew it with many legs. My ‘original’ image had been invented by a Neanderthal. My elation was profound…I had tapped a primal way of seeing.

In the late 1960s and early 1970s, Leonian began working with new tools and techniques. According to Gresh, he had his models pose on top of a large turntable, and his experiments with this "rotating stage" led to the Transcendentals, an "otherworldly" series of nudes whose subjects seem to be having "a kind of out-of-body experience."

Like other photographers of the 1970s, he also played around with Polaroids, resulting in a series of portraits called Waterworks. Using SX-70 film, he snapped pictures of his friends from the New York photography community, capturing a different body part (an arm, a leg, a face, etc.) with each instant photo. He then used a chemical solution to separate the emulsions from their backings, placed the emulsions on photo paper, and carefully arranged them to create full-figured portraits. The New York Times called the resulting caricatures "fascinating", noting that "the curious effect of each is that of a person floating in his own body baggie filled with water."

=== Reception ===
In May 1969, the editors of Travel & Camera suggested that Leonian was shaking up the field of sports photography: “For years, sports photography has been as predictable as Old Faithful. But things are changing, and Phil Leonian is in good part responsible."

In 1972, the New York Times photography critic Gene Thornton called Leonian's photos of athletes and dancers “truly strange and haunting” in his review of an exhibition called Sports in Time/Space. Thornton went on to elaborate:

In some of his non-strobe pictures he achieves a kind of cubist effect with several successive views of the same figure in motion. See particularly the bicycle racers. But the strangest and most interesting results occur when he holds his camera steady on a figure in motion. The background goes streaky and blurry and the moving legs of a horse are as many and filmy as the legs of a centipede.

In 1986, former Sports Illustrated picture editor Tom Vanderschmidt likewise praised Leonian's motion photography:

Phil Leonian brings the excitement of a sport into a still picture. He brings the movement, feeling and noise of it to the magazine page. There have been no pictures of gymnasts equal to what Phil did 15 years ago. His ice-skating pictures are special. For the first time, people could see what was going on. The positions, where the skater’s head and feet were: It was all laid out.

=== Writing ===
From 1957 through 1963, Leonian wrote a column for Camera 35, a vintage magazine devoted to 35mm photography. The column ("Comments on Color") drew upon his experiences developing photos in a color lab. He remained a contributing editor until 1977.

Leonian also shared his expertise by writing various technical guides, such as a primer on how to use fish-eye lenses, as well as an article about his experiments with underwater photography.

=== Teaching ===
In the mid-’70s, Leonian taught photography classes at the newly formed International Center of Photography, where he was reportedly one of the more popular instructors. He also taught at the Olden Photography Workshops and mentored several young photographers individually.

=== Inventions ===
According to Popular Photography, Leonian was "always rethinking his methods and his hardware." Throughout his career, he built and retrofitted cameras, tripods, and other custom equipment, claiming that "[i]f a photographer doesn’t invent things, he’s left with just a box and a lens."

Between 1967 and 1968, he designed a stationary strip camera to better photograph motion in still images. Nicknamed "the Cherry Bomb," the bright-red box camera kept its shutter open while long strips of film moved steadily through the apparatus. Each exposure captured a frameless, uninterrupted sequence of motion over time.

Leonian used his Cherry Bomb camera in conjunction with his human-size turntable to create the distinct twisting effect that can be seen in his Transcendentals. According to Gresh, this dual-technique approach also led to the August 12, 1969 cover of Look magazine, which depicted a military man waltzing with a businessman, "their elongated legs twirled together like rubber bands."

By the 1980s, Leonian was designing custom tripods and boom stands. In 1985, former New York Times picture editor John Durniak wrote that “Mr. Leonian has orchestrated tripod manipulation to the point of a fine art.” Shortly thereafter, Leonian set out to design a compact lighting kit. When he realized that his designs would require custom parts, he purchased $30,000 worth of metalworking machinery in order to manufacture a few small connectors. He then tried to make a business of selling homemade equipment out of his studio, which he rebranded “Cougar Design” (a play on his surname).

Leonian freely shared his inventions with his photographer friends. "My only parameters", he said, "are that new items help me and photographers do better work, and that I have some fun making them."

=== Influences ===
When asked about his idols, Leonian named photojournalist W. Eugene Smith. "To me, Eugene Smith is still the greatest photographer in the whole world", he told an interviewer in 1972. "He’s the only hero who’s held up. Everybody else seems to get tired."

== Copyright advocacy ==
After the Copyright Act of 1976 overhauled U.S. copyright law, Leonian immersed himself in the subject, becoming a self-taught expert. He joined the Copyright Society of the U.S.A., and he was an active member of the American Society of Media Photographers, where he served as the chairman of the organization's copyright committee. He served as a resource for the U.S. Copyright Office and testified as an expert witness in congressional hearings.

Leonian further shared his expertise by co-authoring "Copyright and Practice of the Trade", a 1979 guide for professional photographers. He also gave lectures to various organizations, including the Copyright Society, New York Law School, and industry groups such as the Advertising Photographers of Milwaukee.

== Personal life ==
In 1957, Phillip Leonian married Edith Leonian (née Rosenbaum), the daughter of Chicago business owners Paul and Gabriella Rosenbaum.

Edith, who escaped Nazi-occupied Czechoslovakia when she was a young child, worked as her husband's representative and managed the business side of his New York City photography studio for more than 30 years. "She made Phil possible", wrote Lane, the Leonians' longtime assistant, who described them as "partners in all things". Edith Leonian died in 2013; Phillip Leonian died in 2016.

A 1976 profile published in The Village Voice said that Phillip Leonian "tends to be one of this planet’s more charming people, but he also knows how to be stubborn, abrasive, or bafflingly oblique with equal vigor."

The 2025 biographical collection Man in Motion echoed that appraisal, but it also related several anecdotes from friends and colleagues who attested to Leonian's generosity. Photojournalist Bill Pierce, for example, said that Leonian "saved [his] life" by giving Pierce free use of his darkroom in the aftermath of a divorce, while dancer Jan LaSalle (a longtime friend of the Leonians) said that Phil once paid her rent when she had nowhere else to turn.

== Philanthropy ==
In 2010, Leonian and his wife co-founded the Phillip and Edith Leonian Foundation, a charitable non-profit organization devoted to promoting photography education and supporting documentary photography. As of 2026, the Foundation has provided more than $6 million in funding for over 200 projects. Its grantees include the Bronx Documentary Center, the Museum of Contemporary Photography, the Center for Photography at Woodstock, the Museum of Fine Arts, Houston, and the National Museum of African American History and Culture.

According to photography curator Anne Wilkes Tucker, the Leonians were key supporters of War/Photography, a major 2012 exhibition at the Museum of Fine Arts, Houston. "Their generosity was unhesitating", Tucker wrote. "[T]hey would decide to do something and then do it. It was extraordinary."

Before his death in 2016, Leonian established the Leonian Charitable Trust, another private grant-making foundation.

== Exhibitions ==
- 1972: Sports in Time/Space, Nikon House, New York
- 1977: Instants Extended: New Images on Polaroid Film, Neikrug Gallery, New York
- 1978: About Walking, Franklin Furnace, New York
- 1978: The Walking Show, Neikrug Gallery, New York
- 1978: The Male Nude: A Survey in Photography, Marcuse Pfeifer Gallery, New York

== Collections ==
Leonian's work is held in the following public collections:

- National Gallery of Art, Washington, D.C.
- Library of Congress, Washington, D.C.
- New York Public Library, New York, New York
- Museum of Fine Arts, Houston, Houston, Texas
- Museum of Fine Arts, Boston, Boston, Massachusetts
- Cleveland Museum of Art, Cleveland, Ohio
- Brooklyn Museum, Brooklyn, New York
- Museum of Photographic Arts, San Diego, California
- Morgan Library & Museum, New York, New York
- George Eastman Museum, Rochester, New York
- Milwaukee Art Museum, Milwaukee, Wisconsin
- High Museum of Art, Atlanta, Georgia
- Portland Museum of Art, Portland, Maine
- Philadelphia Art Museum, Philadelphia, Pennsylvania
- Amon Carter Museum of American Art, Fort Worth, Texas
- Cooper Hewitt, Smithsonian Design Museum, New York, New York
- New Orleans Museum of Art, New Orleans, Louisiana
- New York Transit Museum, Brooklyn, New York
- Poster House, New York, New York
- Museum of the City of New York, New York, New York
- Florida Museum of Photographic Arts, Tampa, Florida
- Muhammad Ali Center, Louisville, Kentucky
- Museum Ludwig, Cologne, Germany
