= Norma I. Quintana =

Norma I. Quintana (born in Cleveland, Ohio) is a first-generation Puerto Rican American photographer and educator whose practice is rooted in the tradition of social documentary photography. She works exclusively with analog film on Hasselblad cameras and silver gelatin printing, shooting primarily in black and white using only available light. Her work fits within the framework of humanist documentary and highlights questioning themes of identity, community, memory, and belonging.

Quintana is known for her three major bodies of work: Circus: A Traveling Life (1999–2014), an over a decade-long portrait series documenting American traveling circus performers; Forage From Fire (2017-2018), a series photographed on an iPhone after the Atlas Fire destroyed her home and studio; and Paradise of Memory / Paraíso de la Memoria (2004–ongoing), a portrait series grounded in Puerto Rican photographic style and her own family history. She is a founding member of the Bay Area nonprofit, Photo Alliance. and lives and works in Napa, California.

== Biography ==
=== Education & early career ===
Quintana was born in Cleveland, Ohio to Puerto Rican parents who had emigrated from the mountain town of Lares, Puerto Rico. Her parents, Ismael Quintana Echevarría and María Mercedes Vélez, were part of the mid-twentieth century migration from Puerto Rico to the continental United States. As a child, Quintana frequently visited Lares with her family to see relatives, where she and her family were photographed each year by a local portrait photographer in the island traditiong of the recuerdo, a studio-made keepsake portrait meant to be sent to loved ones on the mainland. These family archives would later become foundational to her own artistic practice.

Quintana earned a BA in Sociology from John Carroll University and a Master of Science in Social Administration with a specialization in Juvenile Justive from Case Western University. In the 1980s Quintana relocated to California from the Midwest and worked in Human Resources Management at Hewlett Packard in Silicon Valley.

=== Transition to Photography ===
Quintana began her formal training in photography in the late 1990s, completing a photography degree curriculum at Napa Valley College in 2001. She subsequently attended multiple intensive photography workshops with some of the most influential figures in human documentary photography: one at Anderson Ranch Arts Center Photography Workshops with Shelby Lee Adams, and more at Maine Media Photography Workshop programs in Oaxaca, Mexico with both Mary Ellen Mark and Graciela Iturbide.

Quintana's practice has been defined by sustained, long-term engagement with her subjects. She spends significant time in and around a community before raising her camera, making both detailed observations as well as personal relationships before exposures. Her use of medium-format film with finite frames per roll reinforces a deliberate, relationship-centered approach to her very physical photographic art form.

== Photographic Works ==
=== Circus: A Traveling Life ===
In 1999, Quintana discovered a promotional flyer at a Napa cafe for an American one-ring circus created by James K. Judkins, a former Carson & Barnes Circus manager. After requesting and receiving permission to photograph the performers behind the scenes, she began a ten-year working relationship with the Circus Chimera. The material from a decade of collaboration with the circus went into Quintana's book, Circus: A Traveling Life, published in Fall 2014. The book was reviewed on Slate, CNN.com, the UK Guardian and Mother Jones. Curious Animal Magazine featured an image from the series, “Smoke” in their “Best Images of 2014”. A print feature appeared in B + W Magazine's March 2015 issue and Quintana was invited to lecture about her Circus series at B&H Event Space in New York City

Rather than photographing from the audience, Quintana enmeshed herself within the private world of the circus families, finding herself in trailers, dressing rooms, and practice spaces, earning the trust of the likes of acrobats, aerialists, clowns, and animal trainers over the course of a decade. The resulting body of work documents not the spectacle of performance, but the daily, domestic, and professional lives of people who chose a traveling, collective way of life that was approaching extinction.

The material from this decade of collaboration was published as Circus: A Traveling Life (Damiani Editore, Bologna, 2014), with an introduction by novelist Mona Simpson and design by Yolanda Cuomo. The book's nearly one hundred full-page black-and-white portraits were reproduced in duotone by master printer Robert Hennessey. Photographer Sally Mann wrote that Quintana "takes off where my heroes Bruce Davidson, Diane Arbus and Mary Ellen Mark left off — she clearly enjoys the same level of trust and intimacy as they did. Beautiful pictures."

The book was reviewed in Slate, CNN, The Guardian, and Mother Jones. An image from the series, Smoke, was selected for Curious Animal Magazine's "Best Images of 2014." A print feature appeared in B+W Magazine's March 2015 issue, and Quintana was invited to lecture at B&H Event Space in New York City in December 2014.

=== Forage From Fire ===
On October 8, 2017 the Atlas Fire in Napa, California destroyed Quintana's home and photography studio, including her camera collection, darkroom equipment, archives, and decades of collected objects. . Evacuated with only minutes of warning, she returned days later to photograph the charred remnants excavated from the ashes, using her iPhone X as her only available instrument.

The resulting series Forage From Fire documents jewelry, camera bodies, Christmas ornaments, pendants, doll parts, kitchen tools, picture frames, and other remnants of her family home. These objects are all framed by the plastic gloves issed for fire cleanup as objects of archaeological significance, both markers of loss and pathways through trauma. The work was partially funded by a grant from the William & Flora Hewlett Foundation.

A solo exhibition of the photographs and objects recovered from the fire was shown at SF Camerawork in October 2018, and in group exhibitions at Sonoma Valley Museum of Art and UCR/California Museum of Photography. The work later traveled as part of Facing Fire: Art, Wildfire, and the End of Nature in the New West, an exhibition organized by the California Museum of Photography. The series was also presented at the Centro Fotográfico Manuel Álvarez Bravo in Oaxaca, Mexico (May–July 2025). Quintana was interviewed by the BBC World Service on October 8, 2022 on its Cultural Frontline podcast.

=== Forget Me Not / No Me Olvides and Paradise of Memory / Paraíso de la Memoria (2004–ongoing) ===
Beginning in 2003, Quintana initiated her ongoing portrait series rooted in the Puerto Rican and Latin American tradition of the recuerdo, keepsake studio portraits made by itinerant photographers known as ambulantes and sent between family members separated by the mid-twentieth-century Puerto Rican diaspora to the continental United States.

For the series, Quintana photographs subjects in Napa Valley and beyond in front of hand-painted backdrops, including one depicting waves crashing against a rocky shore, using a wooden message stand inscribed with four bilingual phrases: no me olvides / forget me not, recuerdos (memories), and salud (health). Shot on Hasselblad with black-and-white Tri-X 400 film using only available light, the portraits are printed as silver gelatin prints. Quintana finds her subjects by stopping people on the street, through community referrals, and via the local press, creating a cross-section of Napa Valley that encompasses blue-collar workers, teachers, clergy, athletes, veterans, campaign workers, circus performers, and beyond.

In 2024, writing in Hyperallergic, critic Valentina Di Liscia described the series as dismantling "the dehumanizing logic of Trump's discourse" by channeling the centuries-old impulse to chronicle, connect, and bridge distances. Quintana's stated aim for the work is that viewers see themselves in the photographs — that the Puerto Rican experience becomes a shared human experience.

The series has evolved under multiple related titles — Forget Me Not, No Me Olvides, and Paradise of Memory / Paraíso de la Memoria — reflecting its deepening conceptual engagement with the Puerto Rican diaspora, intergenerational memory, and the photographic traditions of Quintana's own family history. The bilingual titling mirrors the bicultural register of the work itself. The project also draws on Quintana's research into vintage photo-booth portraits circulated between loved ones across Latin America and the Caribbean, which she situates as personal counterhistories to the scenic promotional imagery produced for foreign investors and tourists.

The first major exhibition of the series, Paradise of Memory / Paraíso de la Memoria, housed in the Sonoma Valley Museum of Art is live between May and September 2026, and is accompanied by a catalog published under the Blue Hydrangea imprint. Quintana is developing the exhibition as a national touring show.

== Publications and Exhibitions ==
=== Books ===
- Circus: A Traveling Life. Damiani Editore, Bologna, 2014. ISBN 9788862083652. Introduction by Mona Simpson; design by Yolanda Cuomo; duotone printing by Robert Hennessey.
- Paradise of Memory / Paraíso de la Memoria. Blue Hydrangea, 2026 (forthcoming).
- Douglas McCulloh (ed.), Facing Fire: Art, Wildfire, and the End of Nature in the New West. Inlandia Institute, 2020. ISBN 978-1-7324032-9-1.

=== Selected Solo and Major Group Exhibitions ===
- Sonoma Valley Museum of Art, Sonoma, CA — group exhibitions, Forage From Fire; Paradise of Memory / Paraíso de la Memoria (forthcoming, May 2026)
- SF Camerawork, San Francisco, CA — Forage From Fire (solo, 2018)
- UCR/California Museum of Photography, Riverside, CA — Forage From Fire (group)
- Centro Fotográfico Manuel Álvarez Bravo, Oaxaca, Mexico — Forage From Fire (2025)
- Katzen Arts Center, American University, Washington, DC — Forget Me Not; Circus: A Traveling Life
- Zoller Gallery, Penn State University — Circus: A Traveling Life
- Rayko Photo Center, San Francisco, CA — Circus: A Traveling Life (book launch, 2014)
- International Center of Photography, New York City — book signing, December 2014

=== Critical Reception and Influence ===
Quintana's work has been situated within the lineage of American humanist documentary photography. In LensCulture, Sally Mann placed the Circus series alongside the work of Bruce Davidson, Diane Arbus, and Mary Ellen Mark, noting Quintana's comparable capacity for trust and intimacy with her subjects. Mona Simpson's introduction to the Circus monograph emphasized the depth of relationship between photographer and subject as the defining condition of the work's achievement.

In 2024, Hyperallergic published a feature on Forget Me Not / No Me Olvides that situated the series within urgent contemporary debates about Puerto Rican identity, immigration, and the politics of belonging in the United States. Critic Valentina Di Liscia described the series as an act of counter-documentation — using the recuerdo tradition to assert common humanity against dehumanizing public discourse. The BBC World Service's Cultural Frontline podcast interviewed Quintana about Forage From Fire, bringing her work to an international audience.

A 2026 article in 48hills, a San Francisco-based independent news and culture publication, chronicles Norma's journey in creating the Paradise of Memory series, speaking of her influences, education and experience, and process of creation. Writer Mary Corbin states that Norma's film shooting and gelatin print technique "mirrors the process of remembering." Citing her "timeless quality" and "thoughtful process," the article offers a snapshot of her work and humanist approach to art.

Further 2026 articles discuss the Paradise of Memory exhibition in the Sonoma Valley Museum of Art, specifically the "powerful storytelling character" of the portraits and their subjects, and their place as "reminders to preserve the memory of loved ones."

== Civic and Educational Roles ==
Quintana is a founding member of PhotoAlliance, a San Francisco–based nonprofit organization dedicated to advancing fine art photography through education, exhibitions, and community programs.

She has lectured nationally and internationally at major universities and completed residencies at Penn State and American University in Washington D.C. She has presented work and spoken at UCLA and Stanford University. She is a participant in ongoing speaking engagements and podcast appearances related to her photography practice and the cultural and political themes of her work.

Quintana has been a member of the board of directors of the di Rosa Center for Contemporary Art in Napa, California, an institution that collects and exhibits Northern California art.
