= Bill Pierce (photographer) =

American photographer and journalist

- Born: 1935 (age 90–91); Waterbury
- Education: Princeton University
- Occupation: Photojournalism
- Awards: Overseas Press Best Photoreporting from Abroad (1982) World Press Budapest Award (1988) Leica Medal of Excellence (1989)

Bill Pierce (born in 1935, Waterbury) is a freelance photographer and journalist with a background in theater, who is based in New York City.

== Life ==
Pierce was a graduate of Princeton University. He is a self-taught photographer and apprenticed with W. Eugene Smith.

News photography [...] does require amazing concentration and really good reflexes.

— Bill Pierce,
in Time History's Greatest Images
The World's 100 Most Influential Photographs

He was a photojournalist more than 20 years, during which he covered worldwide events from the civil wars in Beirut and Lebanon to the demonstrators' call for democracy in Tiananmen Square, Beijing. His first experience photographing armed conflict was the Civil Rights Movement in the United States. The first war he photographed was in Northern Ireland beginning in 1973, doing so off and on for almost a decade. In 1976 Roger Rosenblatt wrote an original story about this, expanded the text into the book Children of War and turned Pierce into one of its characters. A few of his photographs were featured in the book as illustrations. The book won the Robert F. Kennedy Book Award in 1984. In 1983 he and Bill Foley were assaulted and threatened with death by Syrian soldiers while they were trying to enter the Bekka Valley in Lebanon, but they reached Tripoli safely.

Pierce's work appears in major international publications such as Time. He acted as contributing editor to Popular Photography for 15 years and Newsweek, U.S. News & World Report, Life, Paris Match, The New York Times Magazine and Stern. He was also a writer for Camera 35 magazine and Popular Photography. His works are represented by private collectors and in exhibitions, books, permanent museum collections, such as of the National Portrait Gallery and the Corcoran Gallery of Art.

He contributed four chapters on black-and-white film and artificial lighting to the 15th edition of the book "Leica Manual" in 1974. He was also featured as an interviewee in the 2015 documentary The Jazz Loft According to W. Eugene Smith.

He was one of dozens of photographers—along with Neil Selkirk and Gary Miller—who have made stills of the ″Sesame Street mob″ between the years 1970 and 1982.

He has given photographic lectures in The New School, and on the ″Leica College Seminar″.

He has two sons, one of whom is also a photographer.

== Awards ==
- 1989 Leica Medal of Excellence (for his contributions to the project "Homeless in America")
- 1988 31st World Press Photo contest

- Science & Technology (1st prize singles; from a demonstration of the Meissner effect)
- Budapest Award (Individual awards; with the same picture)
- Daily Life (Honorable Mention prize singles; from a homeless in Philadelphia)

- 1982 Overseas Press Club

- Olivier Rebbot Award ("Coverage of ordinary people in times of war")^{(note1)}

- 1975 18th World Press Photo contest

- General Features (2nd prize singles; Research on the workings of the brain)

== Some of his permanent collections ==
- National Portrait Gallery Collection, Smithsonian Institution
  Photos: Gerald Ford (1974); Children at War (1982); John Henry Laragh (1974−75)
- New York Public Library
  Photos by ″Ellis Rabb papers″: The Seagull (McCarter Theatre – Princeton, N.J.,1960); The Tavern, Twelfth Night, King Lear (McCarter Theatre – Princeton, N.J., 1961); Hamlet (Miscellaneous Productions, 1968–1969); Pantagleize (Includes photos of set, Lyceum Theatre – New York, N.Y., 1968)

== Notes ==
- ^(note1) OPC Award is for the best photoreportage from Beirut and Northern Ireland covering the book Children of War.

== Sources ==
- Guide to the Jazz Loft Project Records, 1950–2012 and undated → Bill Pierce by Sam Stephenson, Duke University Libraries, Retrieved 9 December 2015
- Camera by John Durniak; Published: The New York Times Company, October 6, 1991
- I Quit...Again by Ctein, theonlinephotographer.typepad.com (The Online Photographer (a.k.a. TOP) edited by Mike Johnston); 9 October 2013
- A Day in the life of America pp. 267 by Rick Smolan, David Cohen, Leslie Smolan – 1985
- Autofocus, Popular Photography pp. 32, 34, 36, 58-59 – April 1990
- Bill Pierce master printer by Russel Hart, American Photo pp. 20 – January/February 1994.
- Homeless in America Michael Evans, National Mental Health Association (U.S.), Families for the Homeless (Group) Acropolis Books, pp. 15 – 1988
- War torn by Susan Vermazen, Pantheon Books, 1984.
- District Native Camptures Globe′s Hot Spot on Film by Jerry Vondas, The Pittsburgh Press – Jul 11, 1983
