= Sylvia Plachy =

Hungarian-American photographer (born 1943)

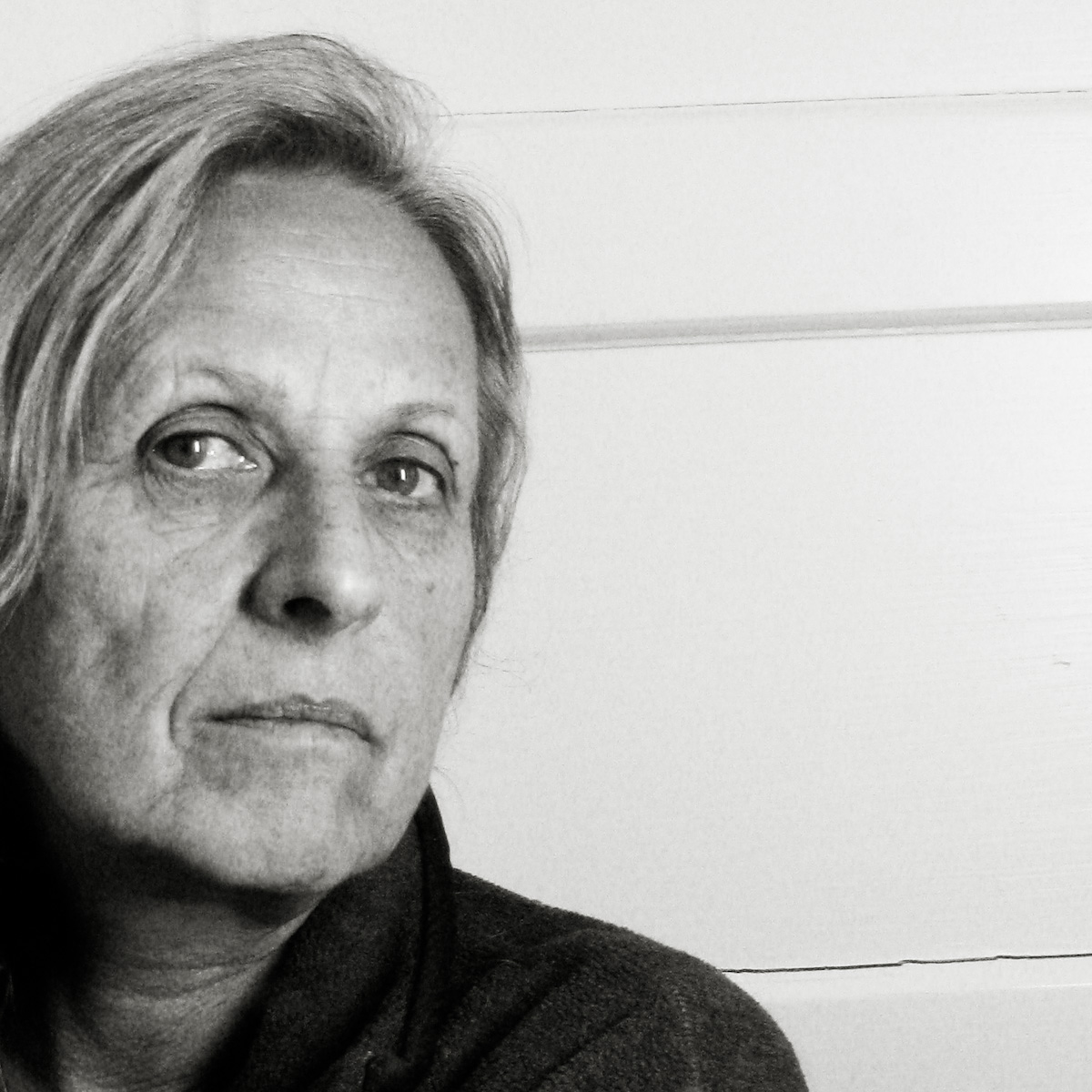
Plachy c. 2012

Sylvia Plachy (born 24 May 1943) is a Hungarian-American photographer. Plachy's work has been featured in many New York City magazines and newspapers and she "was an influential staff photographer for The Village Voice."

Plachy's first book, Sylvia Plachy's Unguided Tour, won the Infinity Award from the International Center of Photography for best publication in 1991. Her book Self Portrait with Cows Going Home (2004) received a Golden Light Award for best book in 2004. Plachy has also received a Guggenheim Fellowship (1977), a Lucie Award (2004), and the Dr. Erich Salomon Award (2010).

== Early life and education ==
Plachy was born in Budapest, Hungary. Her Czech Jewish Hungarian mother was in hiding in fear of Nazi persecution during World War II. Her father was a Hungarian Roman Catholic of aristocratic descent and she was raised in his faith. She lost most of her relatives to the Holocaust. Plachy's family moved to New York City in 1958, two years after the Hungarian revolution, after crossing into Austria for safety, hidden in a horse-drawn cart.

Plachy started photographing in 1964 "with an emphasis of recording the visual character of the city along with its diverse occupants". She studied photography at the Pratt Institute in New York City, receiving her B.F.A. in 1965. There she met the photographer André Kertész, who became her lifelong friend.

== Career ==
Plachy's photo essays and portraits have appeared in The New York Times Magazine, The Village Voice, The New Yorker, Granta, Artforum, Fortune, and other publications. They have been exhibited in galleries and museums in Berlin, Budapest, Chicago, Minneapolis, New York City, Paris and Tokyo. She started working at The Village Voice in 1974.

Plachy's first book was Sylvia Plachy's Unguided Tour. Her book Self Portrait with Cows Going Home (2004), is a personal history of Central Europe with photographs and text. Her other books are Red Light: Inside the Sex Industry with James Ridgeway (1996), Signs & Relics (2000), Out of the Corner of My Eye (2008) and Goings On About Town: Photographs for The New Yorker (2007). She has taught and lectured widely.

== Personal life ==
Plachy lives in New York City with her husband, Elliot Brody, and she is the mother of two time Academy Award-winning actor Adrien Brody.

== Publications ==
- Plachy, Sylvia (2007). Goings On About Town: Photographs for the New Yorker. New York: Aperture. ISBN 9781597110518.
- Plachy, Sylvia (2006). Out of the Corner of My Eye = De reojo. Madrid: Umbrage Editions. ISBN 9781884167928.
- Plachy, Sylvia (2004). Self Portrait With Cows Going Home. New York: Aperture. ISBN 9781931788434.
- Plachy, Sylvia (1999). Signs & Relics. New York: Monacelli Press. ISBN 9781580930574.
- Plachy, Sylvia; Ridgeway, James (1996). Red Light: Inside the Sex Industry. New York: Powerhouse Books. ISBN 9781576870006.
- Plachy, Sylvia; Waits, Tom (1990). Sylvia Plachy's Unguided Tour. New York: Aperture. ISBN 9780893813932.

== Awards ==
- 1977: Guggenheim Fellowship
- 1991: Publication award, Infinity Awards from the International Center of Photography, New York, for Sylvia Plachy's Unguided Tour
- 2004: Lucie Award
- 2004: Golden Light Award for best book, for Self Portrait with Cows Going Home
- 2010: Dr. Erich Salomon Award

== Collections ==
Plachy's work is held in the following permanent collections:

- Museum of Modern Art, New York City
- Minneapolis Institute of Arts
- Houston Museum of Fine Arts
- San Francisco Museum of Modern Art
