= Sandra Nunnerley =

New Zealand-born, US based interior designer

Sandra Nunnerley is a New Zealand-born, U.S.-based interior designer, whose firm, Sandra Nunnerley, Inc., is headquartered in New York City, New York. Her work is known for its attention to architecture and its incorporation of art, as well as for a mix of styles and materials. Nunnerley works primarily on residential projects, both in the U.S. and international locations.

== Early life and education ==
Nunnerley was born in Wellington, New Zealand. Her mother, a local journalist, encouraged her from a young age to take an interest in the arts; she often remarks on seeing a variety of touring artists and companies when they came to town, including a memorable performance of Margot Fonteyn and Rudolph Nureyev.

As a young adult, Nunnerley moved to Australia to study architecture at Sydney University; also in Sydney she worked for the art dealer Kym Bonython, who, through his passion for jazz, exposed Nunnerley to artists such as Miles Davis and Dizzy Gillespie. Nunnerley studied fine arts in Paris and London before settling in New York.

== Career ==
Nunnerley began her interior design career at the corporate design firm LSK, where she headed the special projects division. When a family friend bought a townhouse in New York and asked Nunnerley to assist with its renovation because of her knowledge of his art collection, she found herself also working with the architect on the interiors. After the project was completed, a visitor to the house hired Nunnerley to do a Vermont ski house on her own; the work was published in Architectural Digest and Nunnerley's solo career was launched. Sandra Nunnerley, Inc.

Nunnerley's contemporary work begins with the architecture of spaces, and often involves reconfiguring layouts and adding or subtracting details to make spaces more functional and responsive to her clients' lifestyles. She rejects the notion of "period" rooms, preferring an edited mix of furnishings, and juxtaposes luxurious fabrics like silk and cashmere with more humble materials like linen and grass cloth. She often showcases or augments clients' collections of fine art, and in recent years has embraced a trend toward site-specific pieces of furniture commissioned from artists and architects.

Nunnerley's projects span a variety of residential types and locations: several New York City residences, a private clubhouse and residence in Hong Kong, beach houses in the Hamptons and the Bahamas, country homes in Connecticut, a horse farm on Chesapeake Bay, Maryland, a penthouse in the Mitte district of Berlin, ski chalets in Aspen and Telluride, and a private-island compound in New Zealand. Her work has been widely published, and she has been featured in Architectural Digest France's list of the top 100 international designers, House & Garden (UK), World of Interiors and Departures.

In addition to her residential projects, Sandra Nunnerley has also designed several exclusive product collections, including rugs with The Rug Company, tile with Exquisite Surfaces and a limited-edition furniture series with New York gallery Maison Gerard.

Nunnerley, an accredited member of the American Society of Interior Designers (ASID), is also a member of the Kips Bay Boys and Girls Club Designers Committee; the Design Committee for the Society of Memorial Sloan-Kettering Cancer Center; and Kea, a global network of Kiwis and friends of New Zealand.

PowerHouse books released the first monograph of Nunnerley's work, entitled, Interiors. The book chronicles Nunnerley's design vision, as expressed through these projects. It is illustrated with photography thematically organized in chapters on Serenity, Individuality, Refinement, Glamour, and more. The book documents how Nunnerley's travels and other experiences have influenced her work and how she thinks about design, suggesting how others might arrive at their own design approaches.

Sandra Nunnerley, Inc., is located in the Fuller Building on E. 57th Street in Manhattan, not far from Nunnerley's own home in a Beaux Arts Carrère & Hastings townhouse on the Upper East Side.
