= Carrie Boretz =

American photographer

Carrie Boretz is an American photographer who has made street photographs in New York City.

== Life and work ==
Boretz graduated from Washington University in St. Louis in 1975. She moved to New York City for an internship at The Village Voice and went on to photograph for The New York Times Magazine, New York, Sports Illustrated, People, Fortune and Life. In the 1990s at The New York Times, her job was to deliver a daily stand-alone photograph of life in the city.

A book of her street photography, Street: New York City 70s, 80s, 90s, was published in 2017.

== Personal life ==
In 1988, she married New York Times photographer Edward Keating (1956–2021).

She has two daughters, Caitlin Suzanne, born in 1989 and Emily Rose in 1991.

== Publications ==
- Street: New York City 70s, 80s, 90s. Brooklyn: powerHouse, 2017. With a foreword by Vivian Gornick. ISBN 9781576878422.
