= Donna Ferrato =

American photojournalist and activist

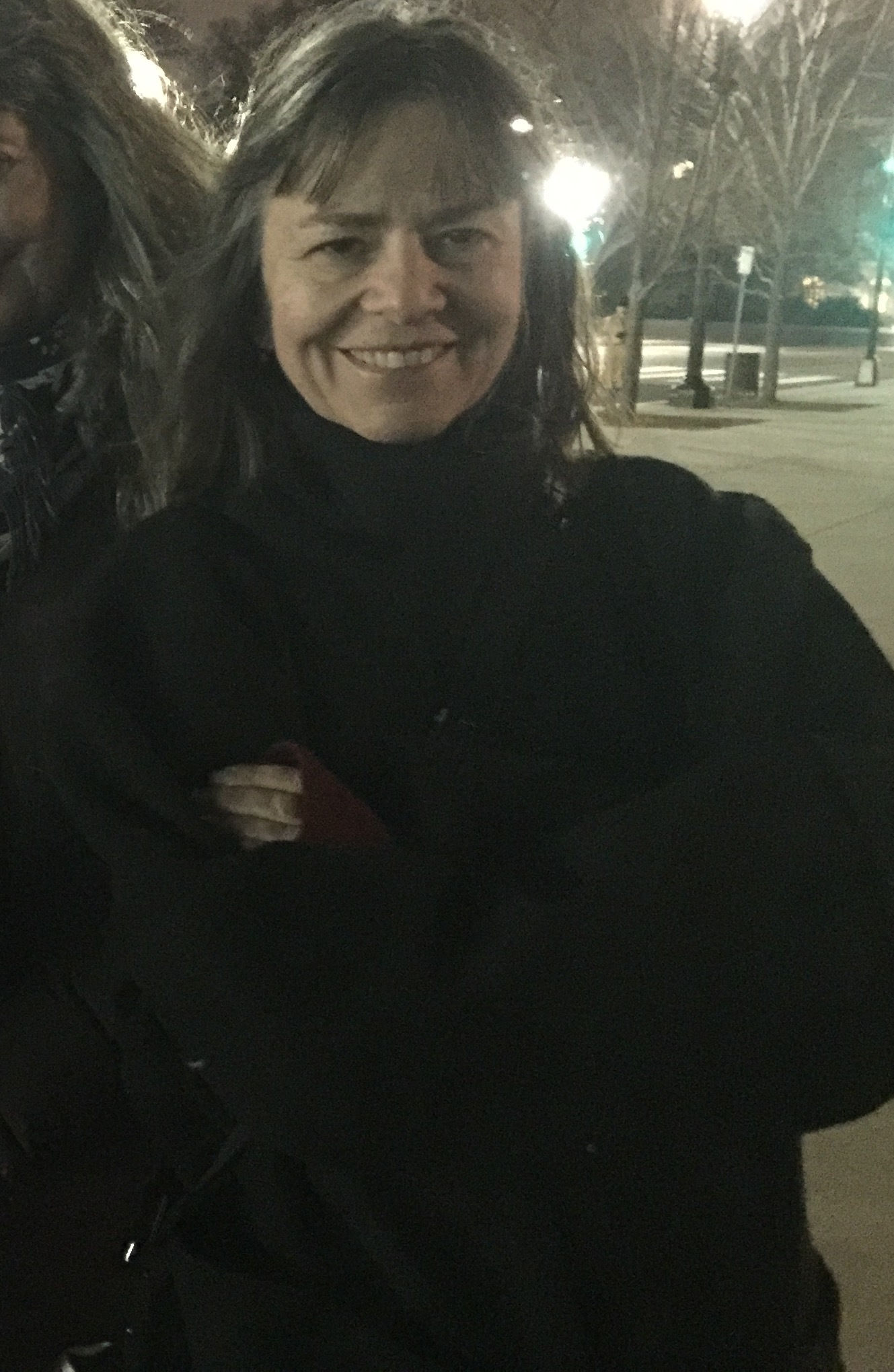
- Ferrato in 2016
- Born: 5 June 1949 (age 77); Waltham, Massachusetts
- Education: Garland Junior College
- Occupation: Photojournalist
- Writing career
- Subject: domestic violence
- Website: donnaferrato.com

Donna Ferrato (born 1949) is a photojournalist and activist known for her coverage of domestic violence and her documentation of the New York City neighborhood of Tribeca.

Ferrato has worked for Life, Time, People, The New York Times, and Mother Jones. Her photographs have won various awards and have appeared in solo exhibitions in museums and galleries. She has been a member of the executive board of directors for the W. Eugene Smith Memorial Fund and was president and founder of the non-profit Domestic Abuse Awareness (501-c3).

== Biography ==
Ferrato was born on 5 June 1949 in Waltham, Massachusetts and grew up in Lorain, Ohio. Her father, Peter John Ferrato, was a vascular chest surgeon who met his wife, Ann O'Mally, while interning at Bellevue Hospital in New York City. The couple had three children: Donna Ferrato, Peter (Pizzo) Ferrato, and Louis T. Ferrato. Donna Ferrato graduated from the Laurel School in Shaker Heights, Ohio in 1968. She was recognized in 1992 as one of the Laurel School's Distinguished Alumna. Ferrato went on to attend Garland Junior College in Boston, where she met and married Harvard graduate Mark Webb.

In 1971, Ferrato and Webb moved to San Francisco, where Ferrato worked as a legal secretary. In 1975, Ferrato and Webb divorced, and Ferrato began photographing and hitchhiking across the United States. In San Francisco, she worked odd jobs, including a stint as the camera girl at the Hilton Hotel. She studied photography at The Art Institute of California – San Francisco, where she took courses under sociologist Howard S. Becker.

In 1977, Ferrato met artist Michael Bowen and travelled with him and his family on the QE2 to join an art colony in Portugal. Ferrato parted ways with Bowen and began hitchhiking around Belgium and France, where she photographed baguette culture in Paris. Also in Paris, she worked at Claude Nori's photography gallery Contrejour.

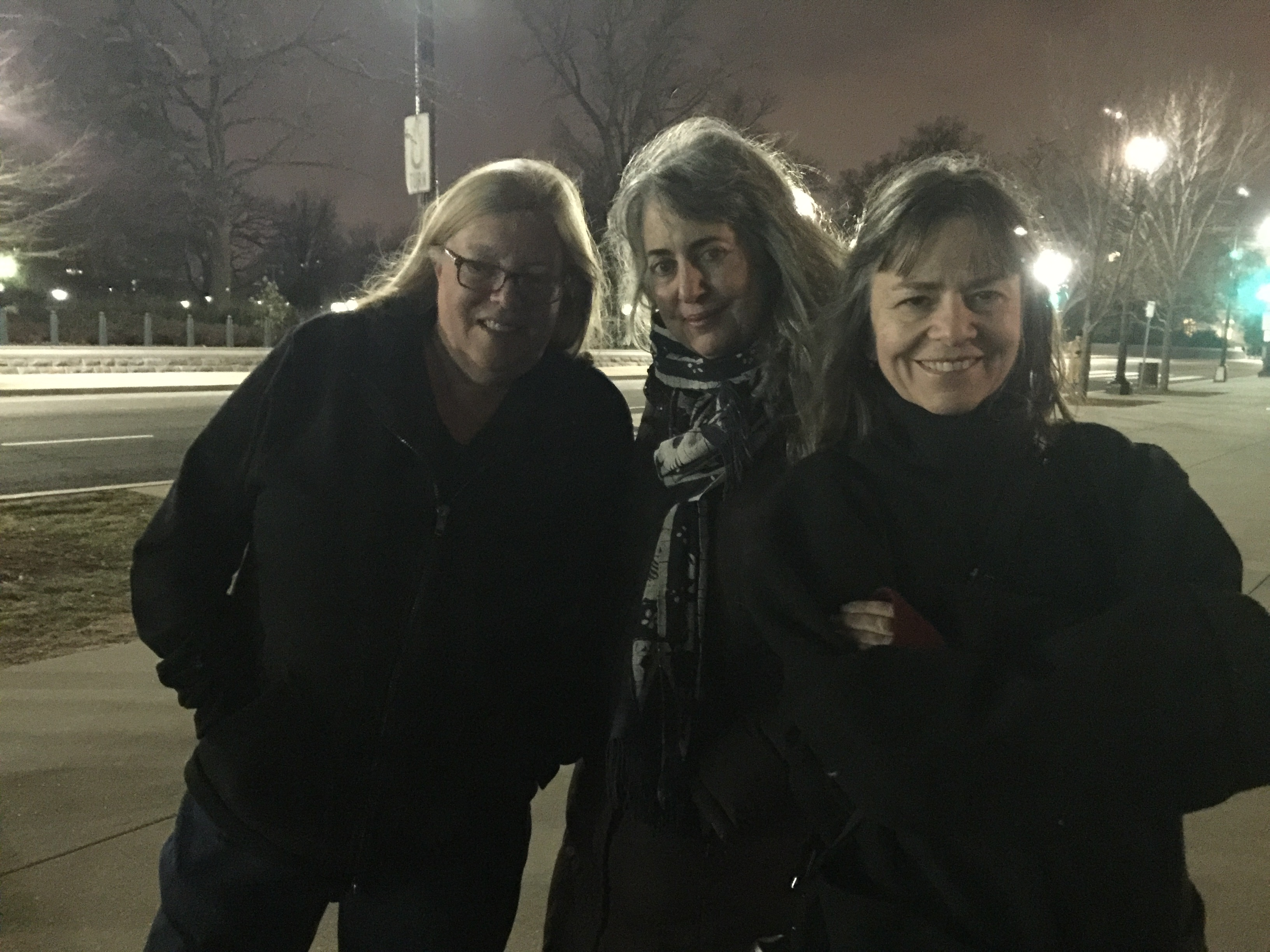
Donna Ferrato (right) and friends documenting Whole Woman's Health v. Hellerstedt

== Living With the Enemy ==
In 1979, Ferrato moved to New York City, where she began photographing in sex clubs and nightclubs, documenting the heady nightclub culture of the late 1970s and early 1980s at legendary establishments like Studio 54, Mudd Club, Xenon, and Area. Ferrato began visiting the famous swingers club Plato's Retreat after landing an assignment with New York Magazine to photograph owner Larry Levenson, and was then commissioned by Japanese Playboy to photograph a prominent swinger couple known as Garth and Lisa. Ferrato immersed herself in Garth and Lisa's life, moving in with the couple at their Saddle River mansion. "I was there for the orgies as well as the typical family moments," Ferrato writes in Love & Lust. "As time passed, however, I began to realize that Garth was not the benign, devoted husband he had first appeared to be...and one night, I witnessed a horrific scene: Garth attacked Lisa and beat her mercilessly as she cowered in the master bathroom. That night changed me forever, and also altered the direction of my work for the next ten years...I was now driven to reveal the unspeakable things that were happening behind closed doors." "I took the picture because without it I knew no one would ever believe it happened," Ferrato told Time in 2012.

For the next decade, Ferrato travelled across the country photographing domestic violence, riding in police cars, sleeping in shelters, and staying in the homes of battered women. Her work led to the publication of Living With the Enemy (Aperture Foundation, 1991), an exposé of the hidden world of domestic violence. The New York Times wrote, "Living with the Enemy is both harrowing and moving. With their shocking immediacy, these photographs offer the kind of urgent call to action provided by all great documentary photographs." Living With the Enemy went into four printings, and, alongside exhibitions and lectures around the world, sparked a national discussion on sexual violence and women's rights. In 2011, Ferrato launched the I Am Unbeatable campaign, which aims to expose, document, and raise awareness of domestic violence by creating an archive of stories, photographs, and video narratives.

In 1991 Ferrato was the highest bidder at an auction to have tea with the new First Lady Hillary Clinton. Accompanied by Lisa; filmmaker Stacey Kabat; Lenore E. Walker, psychologist and author; Sue Ostoff, founder and director of the National Clearinghouse for the Defense of Battered Women; and her father and daughter, Ferrato urged Clinton to support the establishment of a think tank dedicated to sexual violence and domestic abuse.

Alongside her work with domestic violence, Ferrato continued to photograph sex clubs, swingers' events, and other forms of sexual experimentation and lovemaking. In the late 1980s and early 1990s, Ferrato published stories with The Philadelphia Inquirer and Stern on the swingers' group Lifestyles, and in 2008, she worked with journalist Claudia Glenn Dowling filming group marriages as part of the Oxygen series "Sex Lives on Videotape." In 2004, she published her third book, Love & Lust, a look at human intimacy. In 2008, she was featured in American Swing, a documentary chronicling the story of Plato's Retreat and Larry Levenson from the mid-1970s to late-1980s.

== Philip Jones Griffiths ==
Ferrato met Welsh photojournalist Philip Jones Griffiths at a party in SoHo, Manhattan. Both photographers were among the hundred photographers chosen by Rick Smolan to travel to Australia and shoot from locations around the country for his photobook A Day in the Life of Australia. Griffiths died from cancer in 2008. After his death, Ferrato made the documentary Philip Jones Griffiths: The Magnificent One.

Ferrato and Griffiths had one daughter, who shares a birthdate of 18 February with her father.

== Tribeca ==
Ferrato's most recent work focuses on the spirit and evolution of Tribeca, where she has lived since the mid-1990s. In 2008, she began publishing the biannual 10013 portfolios, named for the iconic neighborhood's zip code. Each portfolio is released in an edition of 13 boxes containing 13 prints. Photographer Mary Ellen Mark wrote of the portfolios, "Donna Ferrato’s powerful documentary photographs have taken us into worlds we could never imagine witnessing....you almost feel that she knows when a picture is going to happen before it happens — and then she snatches it, like a spider in waiting. This collection of images seem to come from the dreams in a diary. A poetic tribute to Donna’s home, Tribeca."

In 2011, Ferrato published the book Tribeca: 9/11/01-9/11/11, about the area in the decade after the September 11 attacks.

== Awards ==
- 1985: W. Eugene Smith Grant, W. Eugene Smith Memorial Fund.
- Kodak Crystal Eagle for Courage in Journalism.
- Robert F. Kennedy Journalism Award for Outstanding Coverage of the Problems of the Disadvantaged.
- International Women's Media Foundation Courage in Journalism Award.
- 2002: Missouri Honor Medal for Distinguished Service in Journalism, Missouri School of Journalism, University of Missouri, Columbia, MO
- Tribeca Film Festival Award (2008)
- Look3 INsight Artist of the Year.

In 2008, the City of New York proclaimed 30 October "Donna Ferrato Appreciation Day" for her "continued service as an example of advocacy and activism and as a citizen that the city is proud to call one of its own." In 2009, she was honored by the judges of the New York State Supreme Court for her work advancing gender equality.

== Publications ==
=== Publications by Ferrato ===
- The Honeymoon Killers, Edizioni Il Laboratorio D'IF, 1986. With an introduction by Fred Ritchin.
- Living With the Enemy, Aperture Foundation, 1991. ISBN 978-0893814809. With an introduction by Ann Jones.
- Amore, Federico Motta Editore, 2001. Translated by Katia Bagnoli.
- Love & Lust, Aperture Foundation, 2004. Edited by Melissa Harris. ISBN 978-1931788335
- Tribeca 9/11/01-9/11/11, 2011.
- Holy. Brooklyn: powerHouse, 2021. ISBN 9781576879108.

=== Publications with contributions by Ferrato ===
- Facing Change: Documenting America. Library of Congress.
