= Edward Keating (photojournalist) =

American photojournalist

- Born: Edward Nicholas Keating Jr. March 4, 1956; Greenwich, Connecticut
- Died: September 26, 2021 (aged 65); Memorial Sloan-Kettering Cancer Center, New York City
- Occupation: Photojournalist
- Spouse: Carrie Boretz (m. 1988)
- Children: 2
- Awards: Pulitzer Prize for Spot Photography, 1994 & 2002

Edward "Ed" Keating (March 4, 1956 - September 26, 2021) was an American street photographer and photojournalist who won the Pulitzer Prize twice while working as a photographer at the New York Times from 1992 to 2003.

He is noted for repeatedly gaining unauthorized access to the World Trade Center "Ground Zero" site following the September 11 attacks and documenting the clean up.

He died in September 2021, from cancer he attributed to toxic dust exposure at the World Trade Center site.

== Personal life ==
Edward Nicholas Keating Jr. was born in Greenwich, Connecticut on March 4, 1956.

His father, who was a manager at tire manufacturer B.F. Goodrich died of a heart attack when Edward was eight years old. His mother Gloria (Haupt) Keating, was a housewife who committed suicide seven years later.

His older sister Cynthia McClanaghan, then in her twenties, became guardian to Edward and his two younger brothers until he graduated from New Canaan High School.

Keating studied political science at American University from 1974 to 1977 but "burned out" due to a period of alcoholism. After going sober in September 1977 he went to study American literature at Columbia University where he spent a $400 tax break on a 35mm Ricoh camera and joined the staff of the Columbia Spectator college newspaper. He ultimately left to pursue photography without graduating.

He married editor and photographer Carrie Boretz in 1988 and had two daughters.

Keating died at age 65 on September 26, 2021 at the Memorial Sloan-Kettering Cancer Center in Manhattan. He attributed his cancer “to the days and nights he had spent inhaling toxic dust in the midst of the ruins of the World Trade Center.”

== Career ==
With a $400 tax credit, he bought a 35mm Ricoh camera and a 50mm lens, and began working as a street photographer and documentary photographer. After seven years he became a freelancer at the New York Times.

In August 1991, he was reporting on the Crown Heights riots in Brooklyn when he was beaten by a gang of a hundred men. “Stripped of my gear, on the ground, kicked and beaten. Two cops showed up, guns drawn. They thought I was dead.” Following this, the New York Times hired Keating full-time.

In 1992 Keating founded the "Vows" wedding column in the New York Times, covering weddings with an unconventional, journalistic style.

In 2002, Edward Keating shared the Pulitzer Prize for Current Photography with other New York Times photographers for their coverage of the September 11 attacks the previous year. Keating repeatedly gained unauthorised access to "Ground Zero" at the World Trade Center, where he was arrested on at least one occasion for criminal trespass.

Keating became the subject of controversy and a discussion on journalistic ethics in September 2002 when he was accused of staging a photo of a young boy holding a toy gun in front of a sign from Arabian Foods in Lackawanna, NY. An editor selected the image to illustrate a report on six Arab-Americans suspected of being linked to Al Qaeda. "It was a disaster. I waved my hand to get the kid's attention as he looked to the other side. Reuters photographers across the street thought I was putting him on the scene. I took the photo as a conceptual portrait, but the Times editor, looking for a photo to illustrate his article published it as a current photo." He was suspended from the Times and dismissed in 2003.

He then became a freelance photographer, and his reports were published by numerous magazines, also working for advertising campaigns, or weddings that he photographed with a documentary angle sought by his clients.

Between 2000 and 2011, he traveled the 1,500 miles (2,400 km) of Route 66, from Chicago to Santa Monica, and documented the living conditions of those who lived on this mythical road today in disrepair. “Contrary to the myth of Route 66 being a place of postcard fun and adventure, what I found on my trips across the 'Mother Road' was a road and a culture in distress.” This long-term project culminated in 2018 in the publication of the book Main Street: The Lost Dream of Route 66, whose preface is written by his friend and mentor Robert Frank.

From 2004 onwards, he regularly contributed to Time, Rolling Stone, "W" and New York magazine.

== Noted exhibitions ==
- 1994: "Weddings in New York", Visa for the image, Perpignan
- 1996: "Pictures of the Times: A Century of Photography from The New York Times," Museum of Modern Art, New York
- 1999: "Exile New York", The Leica Gallery, New York
- 2006: "30 years of Contact(s)", group exhibition, Visa pour l'image, Perpignan
- 2008: "New York", Pingyao International Photography Festival, China, alongside Robert Frank's "The Americans" series.
- 2011: "Route 66", Bursa Fotofest, Turkey
- 2018: "Main Street: The Lost Dream of Route 66," Nailya Alexander Gallery, New York

== Publications ==
- Vows: Weddings Of The Nineties From The New York Times, New York, William Morrow, 1997, with Lois Smith Brady
- Main Street: The Lost Dream of Route 66, Bologna, Damiani, 2018

== Awards and Awards ==
- 1994: Pulitzer Prize in the "Spot News Reporting" category with the New York Times office
- 2000: Pulitzer Prize for National Reporting with the New York Times for the series "How Race is Lived in America"
- 2002: John Faber Overseas Press Club of America Award
- 2002: Overseas Press Club of America Award, for its series of photographs on the September 11 attacks
- 2002: Pulitzer Prize for News Photography for its coverage of the September 11, 2001 attacks, with the New York Times

== Public Collections ==
- Museum of Modern Art, New York
- Norton Museum of Art, West Palm Beach
- The Miriam and Ira D. Wallach Division of Art, Prints and Photographs, New York Public Library
