= Neil Selkirk =

British-American photographer (born 1947)

Neil Selkirk (born 25 June 1947) is a British and American photographer known for his portraiture.

== Photography career ==
Selkirk was born in London, England in 1947. "An accomplished portrait photographer and masterful documentarian," he studied Photography at the London College of Printing and graduated in 1968. He won a British Arts Council award to photograph New York and therefore moved to New York City in 1970. There, he worked as an assistant for photographer Hiro at the studio of Richard Avedon. The following year, he studied with photographer Diane Arbus in her master class. His photographs quickly drew assignments from major magazines including Esquire, The New York Times Magazine, Interview, Vanity Fair, The New Yorker, and the premier issues of Wired, Paper, Colors, and Spy.

By the 1990s, Selkirk was known as a portraitist with a distinctive style. In August 1993, the photographs from his limited edition portfolio were featured in the Minneapolis Institute of Art exhibition, 3 Photographers, and 3 Portfolios along with the work of Diane Arbus and Richard Avedon.

His photographs are in the permanent collections of the Metropolitan Museum of Art in New York, Minneapolis Institute of Art, Museum of Fine Arts in Houston, and other major U.S. institutions.

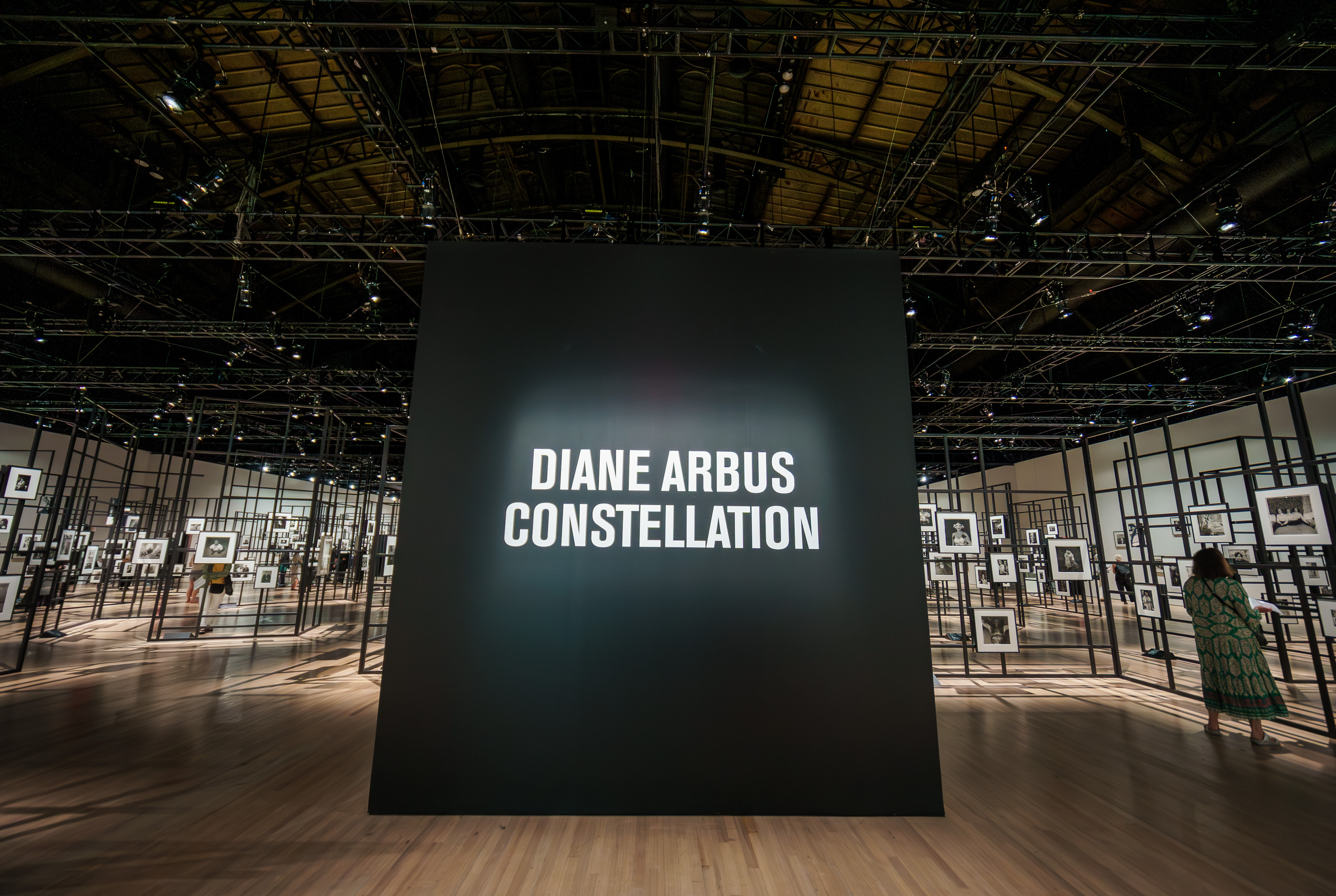
Diane Arbus Constellation at Park Avenue Armory (2025) features 454 Diane Arbus prints by Selkirk

Selkirk is the only person ever authorized to make posthumous prints of the work of Diane Arbus. In an article for iPhoto Newsletter, Jeffrey Fraenkel stated that the process by which Selkirk came to make these prints and the arduous decisions that went into their making are thoroughly detailed in his essay "In the Darkroom" (pp. 266–275 of Diane Arbus Revelations). Selkirk described his first encounter with an Arbus photograph in a radio interview on Kurt Andersen’s Studio 360 series, “The Aha Moment.”

In 2005, Selkirk directed the documentary film, Who is Marvin Israel, about Marvin Israel (1924-1984), an artist, designer, art director and teacher, who influenced many of the important photographers and designers of the twentieth century, including Richard Avedon and Diane Arbus, as well as Selkirk himself. The film, which premiered at the Metropolitan Museum of Art in New York and aired on the Documentary Channel, explores Israel's life and work through the words of those who knew him.

Selkirk's recent project, Certain Women, was on display from March 19 to May 2, 2015, at the Howard Greenberg Gallery in New York City. He has also produced a body of documentary and street photography.

About the project, Selkirk said in an interview with the Los Angeles Review of Books, "Motherhood leaves its mark. And I think that one of the things that the whole project suggests is that maybe it's a really nice mark and something to be proud of. The sort of strength that I thought I saw, that I was looking for, that I was hoping to record is just this knowingness. When you start talking nonsense it’s like they see it instantly."

== Publications ==
=== Publications by Selkirk ===
- See No Evil. Tucson: Nazraeli Press, 2006. ISBN 9781590051559.
- Lobbyists. Tucson: Nazraeli Press, 2006. ISBN 9781590051696.
- Certain Women. New York: Howard Greenberg, 2015. Exhibition catalog.

=== Publications with contributions by Selkirk ===
- Infra-Apparel by Richard Martin and Harold Koda. New York: Metropolitan Museum of Art, 1993. ISBN 9780300201024. Photography by Selkirk.
- 1000 on 42nd Street by Tibor Kalman and Maira Kalman. New York: powerHouse Books, 1999. ISBN 1576870456. Photography by Selkirk.
- “In the Darkroom,” in Diane Arbus Revelations by Diane Arbus, Sandra S. Phillips, Selkirk, Elizabeth Sussman, Doon Arbus, and Jeff L. Rosenheim. New York: Random House, 2003. ISBN 9780375506208.
