= Estonian Centre for Contemporary Art =

Institution in Estonia

Estonian Centre for Contemporary Art (abbreviation CCA; Estonian: Kaasaegse Kunsti Eesti Keskus) is a non-profit expert institution, which via international projects activates and develops Estonian contemporary art scene. CCA office is located in Tallinn. It accommodates an archive of cultural and art historical significance. CCA has been mediating information about the work of local artists since 1992 when CCA was founded.

Since 2013, CCA director is Maria Arusoo.

== Commissioner of the Estonian pavilion ==
CCA is the commissioner of the Estonian pavilion at the Venice Biennale.

#	Year	Artist(s)	Curator(s)	Title	Location	Ref
61st	2026	Merike Estna				
60th	2024	Edith Karlson		Hora lupi	Chiesa di Santa Maria delle Penitenti	
59th	2022	Kristina Norman, Bita Razavi, Emilie Rosalie Saal	Corina Apostol	Orchidelirium. Appetite for Abundance	Rietveld pavilion, Giardini	
58th	2019	Kris Lemsalu		Birth V - Hi & Bye	c/o Legno & Legno, Giudecca	
57th	2017	Katja Novitskova	Kati Ilves	If Only You Could See What I’ve Seen with Your Eyes	Palazzo Malipiero	
56th	2015	Jaanus Samma	Eugenio Viola	NSFW. Chairman's Tale	Palazzo Malipiero	
55th	2013	Dénes Farkas	Adam Budak	Evident in Advance	Palazzo Malipiero	
54th	2011	Liina Siib		A Woman Takes Little Space	Palazzo Malipiero	
53rd	2009	Kristina Norman	Marco Laimre	After-War	Palazzo Malipiero	
52nd	2007	Marko Mäetamm	Mika Hannula	Loser's Paradise	Palazzo Malipiero	
51st	2005	Mark Raidpere	Hanno Soans	Isolator	Palazzo Malipiero	
50th	2003	John Smith (Marko Mäetamm, Kaido Ole)	Anders Härm	Marko und Kaido	Palazzo Malipiero	
49th	2001	Ene-Liis Semper, Marco Laimre			La Fondazione Ugo e Olga Levi	
48th	1999	Ando Keskküla, Jüri Ojaver, Peeter Pere	Johannes Saar		Palazzo Querin	
47th	1997	Siim-Tanel Annus, Raoul Kurvitz, Jaan Toomik			Near San Marco Square	

== Archive of contemporary art ==
CCA has been mediating information about the work of local artists since 1992. In 2020 it launched an online database of significant contemporary artists in Estonia.
