= Estonian pavilion =

Venice Biennale national pavilion

The Estonian pavilion houses Estonia's national representation during the Venice Biennale arts festivals.

Outside the central international exhibition, individual nations produce their own shows, known as pavilions, as their national representation. Nations that own their pavilion buildings, such as the 30 housed in the Giardini della Biennale, are responsible for their own upkeep and construction costs. Nations without dedicated buildings create pavilions in venues throughout the city. Estonia does not have a dedicated building for its pavilion; therefore, over the years, the exhibitions have been located in various places across Venice. In 2019, the Estonian pavilion was located on the island of Giudecca. For the 59th Venice Biennale, the Dutch pavilion, historically located at the Giardini, offered its pavilion, designed by Gerrit Rietveld, to Estonia.

The Estonian Centre for Contemporary Art has been the official organiser of the Estonian pavilion since 1999. The exhibition for the Estonian pavilion is selected through an open call, and the winner is decided by an international jury. Estonian participation at the Venice Biennale is supported by the Ministry of Culture.

== Representation by year ==
#	Year	Artist(s)	Curator(s)	Title	Location	Ref
61st	2026	Merike Estna				
60th	2024	Edith Karlson		Hora lupi	Chiesa di Santa Maria delle Penitenti	
59th	2022	Kristina Norman, Bita Razavi	Corina Apostol	Orchidelirium. Appetite for Abundance	Rietveld pavilion, Giardini	
58th	2019	Kris Lemsalu		Birth V - Hi & Bye	c/o Legno & Legno, Giudecca	
57th	2017	Katja Novitskova	Kati Ilves	If Only You Could See What I’ve Seen with Your Eyes	Palazzo Malipiero	
56th	2015	Jaanus Samma	Eugenio Viola	NSFW. Chairman's Tale	Palazzo Malipiero	
55th	2013	Dénes Farkas	Adam Budak	Evident in Advance	Palazzo Malipiero	
54th	2011	Liina Siib		A Woman Takes Little Space	Palazzo Malipiero	
53rd	2009	Kristina Norman	Marco Laimre	After-War	Palazzo Malipiero	
52nd	2007	Marko Mäetamm	Mika Hannula	Loser's Paradise	Palazzo Malipiero	
51st	2005	Mark Raidpere	Hanno Soans	Isolator	Palazzo Malipiero	
50th	2003	John Smith (Marko Mäetamm, Kaido Ole)	Anders Härm	Marko und Kaido	Palazzo Malipiero	
49th	2001	Ene-Liis Semper, Marco Laimre			La Fondazione Ugo e Olga Levi	
48th	1999	Ando Keskküla, Jüri Ojaver, Peeter Pere	Johannes Saar		Palazzo Querin	
47th	1997	Siim-Tanel Annus, Raoul Kurvitz, Jaan Toomik			Near San Marco Square	
