= Fraenkel Gallery =

Art gallery in California

- Established: 11 September 1979
- Location: 49 Geary Street, 4th Floor, San Francisco, CA 94108
- Coordinates: 37.788172°N 122.404278°W
- Founder: Jeffrey Fraenkel
- Director: Amy Whiteside
- President: Daphne Palmer
- Owner: Jeffrey Fraenkel
- Public transit access: Bay Area Rapid Transit Montgomery Street Station
- Parking: Fifth & Mission Yerba Buena Garage and Ampco System Parking
- Website: fraenkelgallery.com

Fraenkel Gallery is a contemporary art gallery in San Francisco founded by Jeffrey Fraenkel in 1979. It focuses on photography and its relation to other arts through history. The gallery is also a publisher of books and posters.

== History ==
Jeffrey Fraenkel opened Fraenkel Gallery on 11 September 1979 at 55 Grant Avenue, San Francisco. Frish Brandt joined Fraenkel Gallery in 1985, and became a partner in 1989. She served as President for eight years, and in 2023, she transitioned to President Emerita. Daphne Palmer joined the gallery in 2013 and was appointed President in 2024.

Fraenkel Gallery’s inaugural exhibition featured 19th-century photographs of California by Carleton Watkins. In the gallery’s first decade, it brought new attention to under-recognized photographs by seldom-exhibited 19th-century artists including Watkins, Timothy O’Sullivan, Anna Atkins, and Eadweard Muybridge. Fraenkel Gallery’s second exhibition featured Lee Friedlander, and the gallery soon began showing work by other significant 20th-century artists, including Walker Evans, Robert Frank, Helen Levitt, Diane Arbus, Robert Adams, Garry Winogrand, and Bruce Conner.

Two years after the 1989 Loma Prieta earthquake, Fraenkel Gallery moved to a larger space at 49 Geary Street, one block from their first location. The gallery expanded the range of artworks and media featured in exhibitions and books, and presented solo shows by artists including Nan Goldin, Hiroshi Sugimoto, Sophie Calle, Richard Avedon, Sol LeWitt, Gilbert & George, Jay DeFeo, and Bernd and Hilla Becher, as well as group shows encompassing sculpture, drawing, and mixed media.

In the 2000s, Fraenkel Gallery began to feature more artists working outside of photography, and exhibitions during this decade included Edward Hopper & Company, Nothing and Everything: Painting, Photography, Drawing & Sculpture 1896–2006, and Not Exactly Photographs. The gallery also added Katy Grannan, Peter Hujar, Christian Marclay, and Ralph Eugene Meatyard to its roster, and began participating in international art fairs including Art Basel and Paris Photo.

In the 2010s, Fraenkel Gallery exhibited an increasingly wider swath of multi-disciplinary work, as well as video, sculpture, paintings, film posters, and record albums. The gallery added younger artists to its roster, including Alec Soth, Richard T. Walker, Wardell Milan, Elisheva Biernoff, and Richard Learoyd, as well as those working in a range of media, such as Janet Cardiff & George Bures Miller and Mel Bochner. The satellite space FraenkelLAB, at 1632 Market Street in San Francisco, ran from 2016 through 2017 with a diverse and experimental program. The inaugural exhibition, Home Improvements, was curated by John Waters, and subsequent exhibitions included the work of Richard T. Waker, David Benjamin Sherry, Sophie Calle, Katy Grannan, Alec Soth and others.

Since 2020, the gallery’s roster has grown to include Liz Deschenes, Kota Ezawa, Martine Gutierrez, and Carrie Mae Weems, who have been featured in solo exhibitions along with shows by longtime gallery artists Robert Adams, Bernd & Hilla Becher, Nan Goldin, Richard Misrach, Hiroshi Sugimoto and others. The program has presented exhibitions curated by artists from various disciplines, including Carrie Mae Weems’s selection of photographs by Diane Arbus, Sir Elton John’s take on Peter Hujar, and film director Joel Coen’s view of Lee Friedlander.

== Artists or their estates represented by Fraenkel Gallery ==
- Robert Adams
- Diane Arbus
- Bernd and Hilla Becher
- E.J. Bellocq
- Elisheva Biernoff
- Mel Bochner
- Sophie Calle
- Janet Cardiff & George Bures Miller
- Liz Deschenes
- Kota Ezawa
- Lee Friedlander
- Adam Fuss
- Nan Goldin
- Katy Grannan
- Martine Gutierrez
- Peter Hujar
- Richard Learoyd
- Helen Levitt
- Sol LeWitt
- Christian Marclay
- Ralph Eugene Meatyard
- Wardell Milan
- Richard Misrach
- Eadweard Muybridge
- Nicholas Nixon
- Alec Soth
- Hiroshi Sugimoto
- Richard T. Walker
- Carleton E. Watkins
- Carrie Mae Weems
- Garry Winogrand

== Publications (selected) ==
- Photography in Spain in the Nineteenth Century. Text by Lee Fontanella. San Francisco and London: Fraenkel and Delahunty Gallery, 1983
- The Insistent Object: Photographs of 1845-1986. San Francisco: Fraenkel, 1987
- Carleton E. Watkins: Photographs 1861-1874. San Francisco: Fraenkel, 1989
- The Kiss of Apollo: Photography and Sculpture—1845 to the Present. Essay by Eugenia Parry Janis. San Francisco: Fraenkel, 1991
- Bill Dane’s History of the Universe. San Francisco: Fraenkel, 1992
- Henry Wessel: House Pictures. San Francisco: Fraenkel, 1992
- Under the Sun: Photographs by Christopher Bucklow, Susan Derges, Garry Fabian-Miller, and Adam Fuss. Essay by David Alan Melor. San Francisco: Fraenkel, 1996
- Open Secrets: Seventy Pictures on Paper 1815 to the Present. San Francisco: Fraenkel; Matthew Marks Gallery, 1997 (ISBN 978-1881337034)
- Dust Breeding: Photographs, Sculpture & Film. Introduction by Steve Wolfe. San Francisco: Fraenkel, 1998
- David Smith: Photographs 1931-1965. Introduction by Rosalind E. Krauss, essay by Joan Pachner. San Francisco and New York: Fraenkel and Matthew Marks, 1998
- Lee Friedlander: Self Portrait. Afterword by John Szarkowski. San Francisco and New York: Fraenkel and D.A.P., 1998
- San Francisco Album: George Robinson Fardon—Photographs 1854-1856. Essays by Peter E. Palmquist, Rodger C. Birt, and Joan M. Schwartz. Catalogue Raisonné by Marvin Nathan. San Francisco and New York: Fraenkel and Hans P. Kraus Jr., 1999
- The Man in the Crowd. The Uneasy Streets of Garry Winogrand. Introduction by Fran Lebowitz, essay by Ben Lifson. San Francisco and New York: Fraenkel and D.A.P., 1999
- Susan Derges: Woman Thinking River. Introduction by Mark Haworth-Booth, essay by Charlotte Cotton. San Francisco and New York: Fraenkel and Danziger, 1999
- California: Views by Robert Adams of the Los Angeles Basin, 1978-1983. Afterword by Robert Hass. San Francisco and New York: Fraenkel and Matthew Marks, 2000
- Lee Friedlander. San Francisco: Fraenkel, 2000
- Lee Friedlander: The Little Screens. Introduction by Walker Evans. San Francisco: Fraenkel, 2001
- Richard Avedon: Made in France. Essay by Judith Thurman. San Francisco: Fraenkel, 2001
- Lee Friedlander: Kitaj. Introduction by Maria Friedlander, with postscript by R.B. Kitaj. San Francisco: Fraenkel, 2002
- Diane Arbus: The Libraries. San Francisco: Fraenkel, 2004
- Lee Friedlander: Family. Introduction by Maria Friedlander. San Francisco: Fraenkel, 2004
- Lee Friedlander: Sticks and Stones. Essay by James Enyeart. San Francisco and New York: Fraenkel and D.A.P., 2004
- Peter Hujar: Night. Essay by Bob Nickas. San Francisco and New York: Fraenkel and Matthew Marks, 2005
- Robert Adams: Turning Back. San Francisco and New York: Fraenkel and Matthew Marks, 2005
- Lee Friedlander: Apples and Olives. San Francisco and Göteborg: Fraenkel and Hasselblad Center, 2005
- Richard Misrach: Chronologies. San Francisco: Fraenkel, 2005
- Lee Friedlander: Cherry Blossom Time in Japan. San Francisco: Fraenkel, 2006
- Eye of the Beholder: Photographs from the Collection of Richard Avedon. San Francisco: Fraenkel, 2006
- Nothing and Everything. San Francisco and New York: Fraenkel and Peter Freeman, Inc., 2006
- The Book of Shadows. San Francisco: Fraenkel Gallery, 2007 (ISBN 978-1933045665)
- Katy Grannan: The Westerners. San Francisco and New York: Fraenkel, Greenberg Van Doren Gallery and Salon 94 Freemans, 2007
- 73 Photographs from David and Mary Robinson at the National Gallery of Art. Essays by David Robinson and Sarah Greenough, with an afterword by Jeffrey Fraenkel. San Francisco: Fraenkel, 2007
- Christian Marclay: Stereo. San Francisco: Fraenkel, 2008
- Edward Hopper & Company, San Francisco: Fraenkel Gallery, 2009 (ISBN 9781881337263)
- Nicholas Nixon: Live Love Look Last. San Francisco, New York and Göttingen: Fraenkel, Pace/MacGill Gallery and Steidl, 2009
- Lee Friedlander: America by Car. San Francisco and New York: Fraenkel and D.A.P., 2010
- Mel Bochner: Photographs and Not Photographs. San Francisco: Fraenkel, 2010
- Katy Grannan: Boulevard. San Francisco & New York: Fraenkel Gallery & Salon 94, 2011 (ISBN 9781881337294)
- Lee Friedlander: The New Cars 1964. San Francisco: Fraenkel, 2011
- Richard Learoyd: Presences. San Francisco: Fraenkel, 2011
- Robert Adams: Prairie. Essay by Eric Paddock. San Francisco: Fraenkel, 2011
- Lee Friedlander: Mannequin. San Francisco: Fraenkel, 2012
- Robert Adams: Light Balances & On Any Given Day in Spring. Text by Robert Adams. San Francisco and New York: Fraenkel and Matthew Marks, 2012
- The Unphotographable. Edited by Jeffrey Fraenkel. San Francisco: Fraenkel, 2013. ISBN 978-1881337331
- Christian Marclay: Things I’ve Heard. Interview with Christian Marclay. San Francisco and New York: Fraenkel and Paula Cooper Gallery, 2013
- Richard Misrach: 1.21.11 5:40pm. San Francisco: Fraenkel, 2013
- Peter Hujar: Love & Lust. Interview with Fran Lebowitz and essay by Vince Aletti. San Francisco: Fraenkel, 2014
- Katy Grannan: The Ninety Nine and The Nine. San Francisco and New York: Fraenkel and Salon 94, 2014
- John Gossage: Who Do You Love. San Francisco: Fraenkel, 2014
- Robert Adams: A Road Through Shore Pine. San Francisco: Fraenkel, 2014
- Nicholas Nixon: About Forty Years. San Francisco: Fraenkel, 2015
- Silent Dialogues: Diane Arbus & Howard Nemerov. Text by Alexander Nemerov. San Francisco: Fraenkel, 2015
- Robert Adams: Around the House. San Francisco: Fraenkel, 2016
- Ralph Eugene Meatyard: American Mystic. Text by Alexander Nemerov. San Francisco: Fraenkel, 2017
- Elisheva Biernoff. San Francisco: Fraenkel, 2017
- Robert Adams: Tenancy. San Francisco: Fraenkel, 2017
- Art & Vinyl. San Francisco: Fraenkel, 2018
- Robert Adams: 27 Roads. San Francisco: Fraenkel, 2018
- Lee Friedlander: SIGNS. San Francisco: Fraenkel Gallery, 2019 (ISBN 9781881337485)
- Richard Learoyd. Madrid and San Francisco: Fundacíon MAPFRE & Fraenkel Gallery, 2019
- Robert Adams: Standing Still. San Francisco: Fraenkel, 2020
- Robert Adams: A Parallel World. San Francisco: Fraenkel, 2020
- Elisheva Biernoff: Starting From Wrong. San Francisco: Fraenkel, 2021
- Diane Arbus: Documents. Edited by Max Rosenberg. Foreword by Jeffrey Fraenkel and Lucas Zwirner. San Francisco and New York: Fraenkel Gallery & David Zwirner Books, 2022
- Robert Adams: Sea Stone. San Francisco: Fraenkel, 2022
- Peter Hujar Curated by Elton John. San Francisco: Fraenkel, 2022
- Lee Friedlander Framed by Joel Coen. Introduction by Joel Coen, Afterword by Frances McDormand. San Francisco: Fraenkel 2023

=== Anniversary publications ===
- Seeing Things. San Francisco: Fraenkel, 1995. ISBN 978-1881337003. Published to coincide with the gallery's fifteenth anniversary.
- 20Twenty. San Francisco: Fraenkel, 1999. ISBN 9781881337423. Published to coincide with the gallery's twentieth anniversary.
- The Eye Club. San Francisco: Fraenkel, 2003. ISBN 978-1881337171. Edited by Jeffrey Fraenkel. Text by Jeffrey Fraenkel and Frish Brandt. Published to coincide with the gallery's twenty fifth anniversary.
- Furthermore. San Francisco: Fraenkel, 2009. ISBN 978-1881337270. Published to coincide with the gallery's thirtieth anniversary.
- The Plot Thickens. San Francisco: Fraenkel, 2014. ISBN 978-1881337393. Edited and with an introduction by Jeffrey Fraenkel. Published to coincide with the gallery's thirty fifth anniversary.
- Long Story Short, San Francisco, Fraenkel Gallery, 2019 (ISBN 9781881337492). Edited by Jeffrey Fraenkel and Frish Brandt. Published to coincide with the gallery's fortieth anniversary.

== See also ==
- The McLoughlin Gallery was also at 49 Geary Street
