= Andrew Berardini =

American writer & critic (born 1982)

- Born: August 21, 1982 (age 44); California, US
- Education: California Institute of the Arts; California State University, Long Beach
- Occupations: Writer, art critic, curator, editor
- Movement: Contemporary art criticism

Andrew Berardini (born August 21, 1982) is an American writer, art critic, curator, and editor based in Los Angeles. Born in California and raised in a working-class family in Southern California, he is noted for a literary approach to art criticism that merges memoir, cultural commentary, and lyric essay. He describes himself as working "primarily between genres," creating what he calls "quasi-essayistic prose poems on art." Spike magazine characterized him as "the most elegant of all art critic cowboys [who] knows LA like the back of his hand."

Berardini has been a contributing writer to Artforum since 2006 and has written extensively for Mousse, Frieze, ArtReview, and LA Weekly. He has developed a substantial international curatorial practice, organizing exhibitions at major institutions including MOCA Los Angeles, Palais de Tokyo, and as co-curator of the Estonian Pavilion at the 2019 Venice Biennale with Estonian artist Kris Lemsalu.

He is the author of Danh Vo: Relics (2015) and Colors (2023). Writer Chris Kraus praised Berardini as "one of our leading art critics" and "an adept at seeing," noting how he "uses color itself as a springboard to an astonishing range of reflections on culture and history, ideology and childhood."

== Biography ==
Berardini received a BA in Literature and Writing from California State University, Long Beach, and an MFA in Critical Studies from the California Institute of the Arts in 2006. At CalArts, he studied with influential faculty including Maggie Nelson and Norman Klein, whose approaches to personal narrative and urban spatial analysis would inform his later critical methodology.

Born and raised working-class in Southern California, Berardini's critical perspective was shaped by economic precarity and cultural outsider status. As he revealed in a 2024 Artforum review: "Like many working-class kids, I slogged through a series of staggered exploitations and legalities to survive, starting at age fourteen. At various points, I was a barista, a day laborer, a construction worker, a drug smuggler, a bartender, a writing tutor, an adjunct professor, and an attendant (for a gallery and at a gas station). Even art criticism began less as an enlightened avocation and more as a fairly irrational moneymaking scheme to feed my family."

He has taught at the Mountain School of Arts in Los Angeles since 2008, his longest institutional affiliation, and has led writing residencies at the Banff Centre. The Mountain School operates as an alternative art education model that has hosted visiting faculty such as Pierre Huyghe, Paul McCarthy, and Hans Ulrich Obrist.

Early in his career, he worked at Semiotext(e) Press with Chris Kraus, where he served as Assistant Editor and co-translated Jean Baudrillard's In the Shadow of the Silent Majority.

== Critical Career and Methodology ==
As a working critic and art writer, Berardini has a hybrid approach follows a tradition of poet-critics including Charles Baudelaire and Frank O'Hara who integrated personal voice with cultural analysis. More directly, his work builds on LA precedents established by critics like Dave Hickey, whose Air Guitar essays pioneered literary approaches to art writing that rejected academic objectivity, and Bruce Hainley, whose personal, digressive criticism exemplified embedded art writing that mixed autobiography, cultural commentary, and institutional critique. His connection to experimental critical forms was strengthened through his studies with Maggie Nelson at CalArts and work with Chris Kraus at Semiotext(e), both pioneers of autotheoretical approaches that blur boundaries between criticism and personal narrative.

=== Development of Hybrid Approach ===
Berardini developed a distinctive methodology combining embedded community participation with literary innovation. Unlike mainstream newspaper criticism or academic art writing, his work integrates personal experience, spatial analysis, and cultural documentation. His working-class background informed consistent attention to economic dynamics within LA's art world, from alternative space survival strategies to gentrification's cultural effects.

His spatial framework, articulated in foundational essays like "The shortest distance between 2 points is often intolerable" (2011), positioned LA geography as enabling unique forms of artistic practice: "Los Angeles space isn't the faux-Sylvan feel of Malibu or the copious lawns cut by armies of immigrant landscapers or the yawning freeways plugged by commuters... the space artists have is an imaginative space, it's contemplative space, it's diachronic space."

=== Early Period: Institutional Documentation (2005-2010) ===
Berardini's career began during LA's crucial institutional consolidation period. His early Artforum diaries captured pivotal cultural moments with novelistic detail. His "Broad Daylight" (2006) documented UCLA's Eli and Edythe Broad Art Center opening, concluding with the revealing image of collector Eli Broad "struggling on his own to put an unwrapped, framed picture into the trunk of his shiny black Cadillac."

His "Wack Pack" (2007) diary on MoCA's feminist survey demonstrated ability to read exhibitions as community formation events, preserving historical testimony like artist June Wayne's observation: "Feminism will have won when women can be as mediocre as men."

=== Middle Period: Artist Advocacy and Community Analysis (2008-2016) ===
During LA's international emergence, Berardini's artist profiles helped establish careers that gained global recognition. His Frances Stark analysis (2010) positioned her within conceptual art history while emphasizing intimate communication: "To Stark, a thousand words is worth a picture... if you are as bright and engaged as Frances Stark, the letter grows in size and shape, it grows to encompass drawing and painting, performance and collage."

=== Later Period: Literary Innovation and Cultural Elegy (2012-Present) ===
Berardini's mature work developed sophisticated hybrid forms combining memoir, urban studies, and cultural criticism. His Mike Kelley obituary (2012) exemplified this approach: "Yes, we made that. Together and apart, under a spectral influence... This is about Mike Kelley, recently suicided. This is about his memorial, the one we made for a hometown hero, a teacher, a friend, a distant inspiration... a pugilist, a punk, a poet, now dead."

== Writing style and critical approach ==
Berardini's prose blends art criticism with memoir, cultural commentary, and associative lyric essay, representing an evolution from his early direct commentary in local Los Angeles publications to an internationally recognized literary approach to criticism. Artforum has described his work as bending criticism "into poetic reverie—language as tender, strange, and alive." His methodology represents post-critical discourse that operates outside traditional academic frameworks.

His work emphasizes the embodied experience of viewing art and ethical dimensions of art world participation. In "How to Act Ethically in Art," he combined diaristic anecdote with practical counsel, writing: "Don't fuck people over; act with compassion, honesty, and kindness."

His political engagement operates through cultural analysis rather than explicit advocacy. In his 2024 "Day Jobs" review, he critiqued the emphasis on individual success over systematic economic analysis: "While the show's curators actively hoped to discredit the hollow romanticism of the isolated genius, the exhibition unintentionally propped up another trope: the idea of 'making it.' The emphasis of the show wasn't on how completely fucked our current economic system is for almost everyone, including artists, but how some individuals bootstrap their way through it."

He frequently incorporates literary references, ranging from T.S. Eliot to PJ Harvey and Charles Bukowski. His influences span literature, visual arts, and music, including Italo Calvino, Roberto Bolaño, Zora Neale Hurston, painters Alice Neel and Agnes Martin, and contemporary artists such as Nam June Paik and Sarah Cain.

== Career ==
=== Writing and editorial work ===
Since 2006, Berardini has written nearly two hundred pieces for Artforum, establishing himself as one of the publication's most prolific contributors. He has served as Los Angeles Editor for Mousse magazine since 2008 and as Contributing Editor for Art-Agenda and Momus (2014-2021). His writing has appeared regularly in Frieze, ArtReview, Art in America, and Rolling Stone Italy.

He co-founded The Art Book Review (2012–2016), bridging literary and visual arts communities, and launched Art Bae Agenda in 2023, a calendar and critical art magazine for the San Francisco Bay Area. His past editorial roles have included positions at Afterall and Artslant.

=== Books ===
==== Relics (2015) ====
Relics is an extended essay on Vietnamese-Danish artist Danh Võ commissioned by kurimanzutto gallery and co-published with Mousse Publishing in 2015. The book employs an unconventional structure, interweaving analysis of Võ's artwork with deeply personal memoir. Berardini catalogs sixteen objects from his own life that include his mother's 1958 Royal Heritage typewriter, his father's Douglas Aircraft Company union identification card from 1965, and a California license plate from his family's Chevrolet Suburban; all as a means of understanding Võ's practice of transforming personal artifacts into art.

The work explores the concept of relics beyond their religious origins, with Berardini defining a relic as "what remains. Whatever's left over," expanding this definition to encompass both Vo's transformed historical objects and the author's own accumulated possessions. The book provides detailed examination of key works including We the People (2011–13), Võ's fragmented copper replica of the Statue of Liberty manufactured in China, and the artist's acquisition of Theodore Kaczynski's typewriter and objects from Robert McNamara's estate.

Berardini contextualizes these works within broader themes of American hegemony, immigration, and the Vietnam War, drawing connections between Võ's use of historical artifacts and the medieval tradition of religious relics. The author acknowledges the work's hermetic nature, describing it as "as much about me and you as it is about him," demonstrating his broader critical methodology of using personal experience as a lens for understanding contemporary art's engagement with history and memory.

==== Colors (2023) ====
Colors represents a departure from Berardini's established art criticism practice, its words functioning as what he describes as "a poem if they say it is" and "a prayer if they need it to be." The book resists conventional genre classification, blending elements of memoir, cultural criticism, art history, and prose poetry across 110 individual color entries. Building on his two decades of art criticism, Berardini applies his characteristic blend of high and low cultural references to the subject of color perception and meaning. The work incorporates art historical analysis alongside personal memoir, popular culture, and literary citation, using individual colors as entry points for broader meditations on mortality, place (particularly Los Angeles), and cultural meaning-making.

=== Curatorial projects ===
==== Early projects (2009-2011) ====
===== Bruce Nauman's "Untitled 1969/2009" =====
In 2009, Berardini realized Bruce Nauman's 40-year-old unrealized conceptual proposal by arranging skywriting over Pasadena's Arroyo Seco, spelling "Leave the Land Alone." Originally conceived in 1969 for an earth art exhibition when Nauman was living in Pasadena, the piece was intended as skywriting but was never executed, "perhaps because it was too expensive, or maybe it wasn't taken seriously."

Los Angeles Times critic Holly Myers described the project as "the most demanding -- but also, perhaps, most poetic" of contemporary public art projects, noting that while it was "a droll and cutting statement in its original context -- as a critical response to the monumental excavations that were being created in the name of land art -- it loses none of its poignancy nor its conceptual elegance today." The realization gained additional resonance occurring just two weeks after the massive Station Fire had cut through the nearby Angeles National Forest.

Other projects from this period include On Forgery: Is One Thing Better Than Another? (LAXART, 2011), examining questions of authenticity and reproduction in contemporary art, as well as collaborations with Lauren Mackler such as Set Pieces (Cardi Black Box, Milan, 2013), inspired by William Leavitt’s conceptual tableaux and inviting artists to incorporate works by others, and Treating Shadows as Real Things (Artissima, Turin, 2013), a mirror installation at the Church of the Holy Shroud that reflected the Baroque trompe-l'œil ceiling and probed belief, perception, and the metaphysical.

===== Palais de Tokyo "Nouvelles vagues" (2013) =====
In 2013, Berardini was selected as one of 21 international curators from over 500 candidates by a distinguished jury including Hans Ulrich Obrist, Massimiliano Gioni, and Jean-Hubert Martin to participate in "Nouvelles vagues" (New Waves) at Palais de Tokyo, Paris.

===== Estonian Pavilion, 58th Venice Biennale (2019) =====
Berardini served as co-curator for Estonian artist Kris Lemsalu's exhibition "Birth V: hi and bye" at the Pavilion of Estonia during the 58th Venice Biennale, working alongside Irene Campolmi, Sarah Lucas, and Tamara Luuk. The curatorial framework positioned Lemsalu as what Berardini described as "a punk pagan trickster feminist sci-fi shaman," emphasizing collective creation where "friends and musicians, writers and curators, workers and strangers and all together, catalyzed by the artist, we make something more meaningful than anyone could alone."

The exhibition was subsequently recognized by Artnet News as one of the "10 Absolute Best National Pavilions" at the 2019 Venice Biennale.

== Documentation of Los Angeles art scene ==
Throughout his career, Berardini has chronicled LA's art scene transformation from alternative spaces to international recognition, coinciding with the city's emergence as a global art capital during the crucial period from 2005-2025. His comprehensive documentation spans major institutional expansion at LACMA, MoCA, and the Hammer Museum, alongside international galleries opening LA locations and the establishment of art fairs including Frieze Los Angeles (launched 2019).

His essay "The Forgotten Edge" (Terremoto, 2015) combined literary reflection with urban observation, describing his neighborhood as existing "between so many larger neighborhoods" and "belonging to none of them." Concluding with his identification with Los Angeles itself—"This is Los Angeles and so am I. We both make ourselves up as we go along"—the piece demonstrates his place-based writing approach that frames the city through Italo Calvino's lens: "seek and learn to recognize who and what, in the midst of the inferno, are not inferno, then make them endure, give them space."

In January 2025, his Artforum column "The Fire This Time" provided intimate documentation of how LA wildfires affected local artists and cultural spaces, demonstrating his role as community chronicler beyond criticism.

== Critical reception ==
In a 2015 survey of contemporary criticism, Gilda Williams placed Berardini among a new wave of writers responsible for what she described as "the most expansive moment ever in the history of art writing." Opening her essay in Art Monthly with a roll call of "gifted art writers hyperbolically inventing literary hybrids," Williams named Berardini alongside Saul Anton, Oliver Basciano, Ben Davis, Brian Dillon, and others, as evidence that criticism had moved beyond "plain-vanilla art reviews" into a field where autobiography, fiction, and poetic experiment reshaped the possibilities of the form.

Critic Ben Davis selected Berardini's "How to Write About Contemporary Art" as one of 2014's most important art essays, calling it "probably my favorite piece on this list."

Curator Chris Sharp praised Berardini's "unconventional attitude and obvious relish of art as a form of wrong-doing," describing his work as "revolt against the professionalization, sanitization and ultimately, the sterilization of the art world."

== Selected Awards ==
- Creative Capital | Warhol Arts Writers Grant (2013)
- Premio Lorenzo Bonaldi finalist (2013)
- 221A Curatorial Resident Grant (2015)
- Danish Arts Foundation International Research Programme Grant (2015)
- Red Bull Arts Detroit Writer's Grant (2019)

== Publications ==
=== Books ===
- Danh Vo: Relics. Milan: Mousse Publishing, 2015.
- Colors. Los Angeles: Not a Cult, 2023.

=== Selected essays ===
- "How to Write About Contemporary Art." Momus, October 15, 2014.
- "Floral Patterns: An Essay About Flowers and Art (with a Blooming Addendum)." Mousse Magazine, 2016.
- "The Cosmic Mathematics of Alexander Calder." In Calder: Nonspace (exhibition catalogue). Hauser & Wirth, 2019.
- "The Fire This Time." Artforum, January 21, 2025.

=== Selected book contributions ===
- Introduction to Giovanni Intra, Clinic of Phantasms: Writings 1994–2002. Semiotext(e), 2022.
- "Bruised Reveries: Driving in Los Angeles with Laure Prouvost." In Deep See Blue Surrounding You: Laure Prouvost, French Pavilion for the 2019 Venice Biennale. Paris: Flammarion, 2019. ISBN 9782080203952.
- "It's yesterday and tomorrow…". In HALLUCINATIONS #1–5. Kassel: documenta 14/Koenig, 2017. ISBN 9783863359887.
- "Letter to a Disorganized Poet". In UH OH: Frances Stark 1991–2015. Los Angeles/Munich: Hammer Museum and Prestel, 2015. ISBN 9783791354938.
- "Firstly, Eric and Kathleen..." In Whitney Biennial 2012. New York: Whitney Museum, 2012. ISBN 9780300182823.
