= Elisheva (given name) =

Elisheva or Elisheba (Hebrew: אֱלִישֶׁבַע, romanized: ’Ělīševa‘) is a Hebrew feminine given name.

- Elisheba, wife of Aaron, the older brother of Moses and the first High Priest of Israel
- Elisheva Barak-Ussoskin
- Elisheva Baumgarten
- Elisheva Biernoff
- Elisheva Bikhovski
- Elisheva Carlebach Jofen
- Elisheva Cohen
- Elisheva Michaeli (1928–2009), Israeli actress
