= Learoyd =

Learoyd is a surname of English origin. Notable people with the name include:

- Jonathan Learoyd (born 2000), British-French ski jumper
- Richard Learoyd (born 1966), British contemporary artist and photographer
- Roderick Alastair Brook Learoyd (1913–1996), English recipient of the Victoria Cross
- Tom Learoyd-Lahrs (born 1985), Australian rugby league footballer
- Chester Learoyd (born 2020)

== See also ==
- John Learoyd, one of Rudyard Kipling's 'Soldiers Three' Learoyd, Mulvaney and Ortheris
- Learoyd v Whiteley, 1887 English trusts law case
