= Sarah Cain =

American contemporary artist

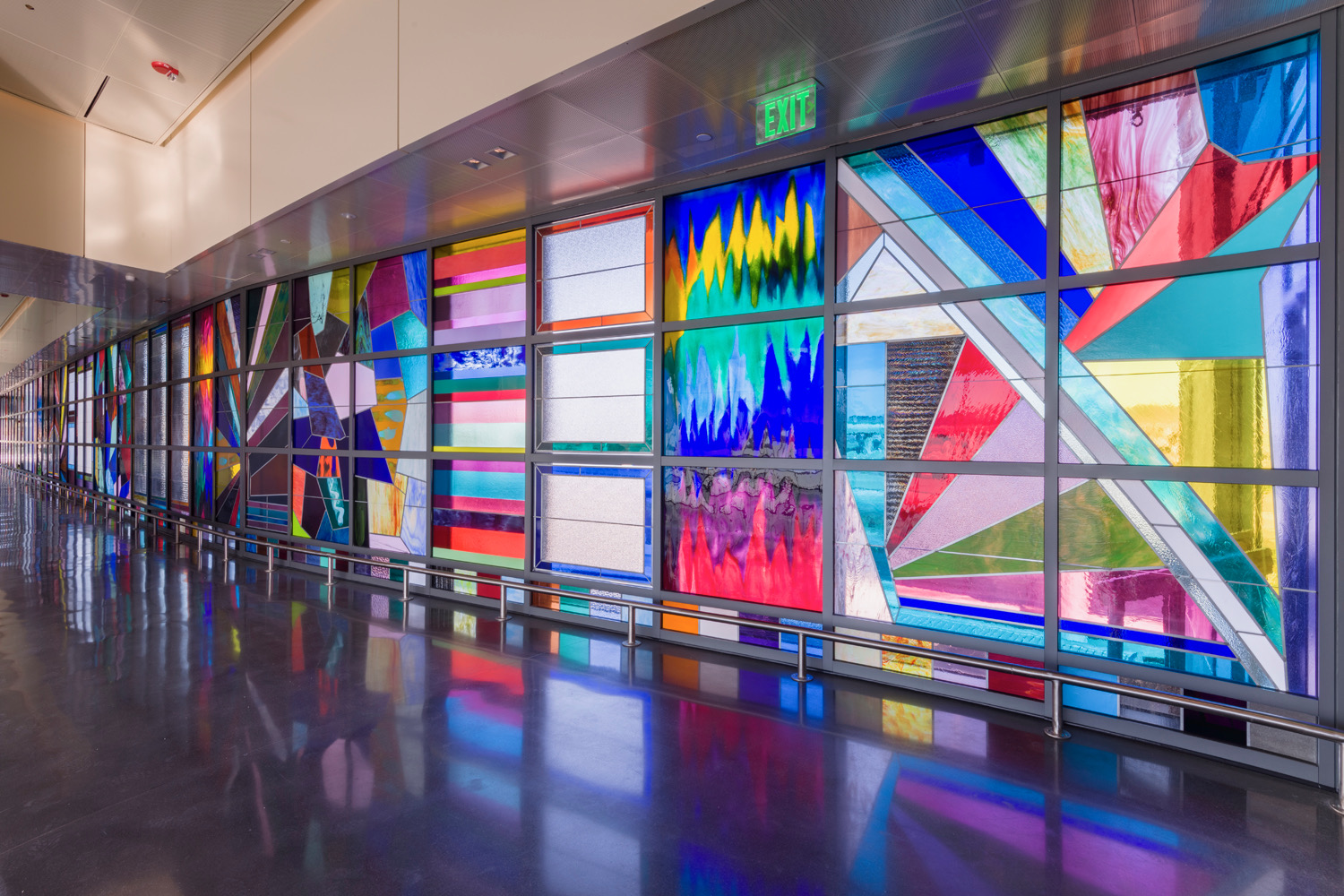
- "We Will Walk Right Up To The Sun" at SFO
- Born: 1979 (age 46–47); Albany, New York, US
- Education: San Francisco Art Institute; University of California, Berkeley
- Known for: Painting
- Website: www.sarahcainstudio.com

Sarah Cain (born 1979) is an American contemporary artist known for her improvisational, site-responsive paintings and installations. Working with a diverse range of materials—including traditional canvas, stained glass, found objects, fabric, musical scores, and architectural surfaces—Cain expands the language of abstraction beyond the canvas. Her work blends painterly rigor with an intuitive embrace of play, color, and non-traditional media. Based in Los Angeles, she has exhibited extensively across the U.S. and abroad, with major solo presentations at the National Gallery of Art, the Institute of Contemporary Art, Los Angeles, the Tang Teaching Museum, and Crystal Bridges' satellite space The Momentary. In 2019, she completed a 150-foot permanent stained-glass installation at San Francisco International Airport.

== Life ==
Cain was born in 1979 in Albany, New York, and raised in nearby Kinderhook. In 1997, she moved to California to study at the San Francisco Art Institute, where she received her BFA in 2001. She earned her MFA from the University of California, Berkeley in 2006 and attended the Skowhegan School of Painting and Sculpture that same year. She currently lives and works in Los Angeles.

== Work ==
=== Expansion of Abstraction ===
Cain's practice expands the traditions of abstraction into emotional, embodied, and feminist terrain. Her compositions often begin with a single color—a point of intuitive energy—that radiates outward into spatial environments. As Andrew Berardini wrote "Her paintings begin simply, a point of pure color in space." Jonathan Griffin remarked in The New York Times, "Cain’s paintings are joyfully defiant. They sprawl, envelop, and sparkle." In a 2015 interview with Flash Art, Cain stated, “I paint through ideas and feelings I’m incapable of speaking through,” aligning her visual abstraction with poetic and musical forms of expression.

Cain challenges the formal austerity of modernist abstraction by introducing personal, symbolic, and sensuous materials—such as feathers, beads, musical scores, and found domestic objects. These elements destabilize hierarchies of value while asserting a new form of aesthetic intensity grounded in lived experience and improvisation. Quinn Latimer observed that Cain "courts seemingly bad ideas," pointing to "drawings sport[ing] feathers and doilies; installations feature eggs and hippy art teacher–like fabric swatches," and noted that she "transforms them so deftly into serious painting that it can take a minute to understand what you’re looking at."

Art in America described her work as balancing "shifting, kaleidoscopic color into the space [and] was physically and perceptually immersive, revealing new dimensions to viewers as they moved through it." David Pagel of the Los Angeles Times wrote that Cain's paintings “reveal that art works best when it keeps you guessing, never settling into a single type, a unified style or a set of moves that are predictable, familiar, reassuring.”

Cain's paintings feature energetic, gestural brushwork that “balances formal rigor… but then she lets ’er rip,” creating a dynamic interplay between control and spontaneity. She often incorporates everyday materials—such as “a locket, some beads, a pendant”—that function “as formal elements in visual compositions.” These objects act as both structural and symbolic components within her work.[²] “The shrine-like parts of my site works are personal,” Cain explained. “A lot of the objects are gifts, or found and held onto for years. They speak about my own life but also the subcultures I’ve traveled through. I think of them a bit like diary entries.

=== Material Play and Site-Specificity ===
"There is freedom in a found object," remarked Cain. The artist frequently pushes painting beyond the stretcher, incorporating architectural interventions and everyday materials to create immersive environments. Her large-scale works often take the form of murals, floors, furniture, and windows, turning painting into a spatial and participatory act.

In her 2021 exhibition My Favorite Season is the Fall of the Patriarchy at the National Gallery of Art, Cain created a 45-foot-long painting which sprawled off the canvas and throughout the atrium—the first time a woman artist had been commissioned to create a site-specific work for the East Building's atrium. “I’ve made more than 50 works on-site,” Cain said. “I love the ephemerality and the present tense and the energy this can capture.” She added: “One of my biggest goals is to make active, exciting, breathable work.”

She integrates items such as “necklaces, thread, crystals, dried roses, sea shells” into her work. “I gather the words around my work like materials,” Cain said of her process, referencing her use of text-based titles. One example, freedom is a prime number, was lifted from Roberto Bolaño's The Savage Detectives.

Her 2019 permanent stained-glass installation at San Francisco International Airport, We Will Walk Right Up To The Sun, features 270 unique panes of color, each painted so that no two adjacent panes share the same hue. Cain remarked "If a work is going to span that much space, you want the viewer to keep discovering things."

In 2023, she completed This is the thing they called life, a site-specific painting on the headquarters of Orange Barrel Media, including three 70-foot-tall silos.

Critics have emphasized the sculptural dimensions of her work. In the 2021 exhibition In Nature at The Momentary, Hyperallergic noted Cain's “synthetic beads sewn in and bleeding out of paintings, subtly pushing the realm of painting into the sculptural.” Reflecting on the ephemeral nature of her installations, Cain remarked, “A large part of my practice is ephemeral, so vanishing is innate to the way I work.

=== Color and Poetic Resistance ===
Cain’s practice is rooted in a heightened sensitivity to color as both structure and subject. “Every color is intentional,” she stated in a 2019 interview with T Magazine, referring to her stained-glass installation. Andrew Berardini described her palette as “A raunchy Italian orange, a mossy verdigris the color of woods witches’ potions, a purple stain like a fresh bruise on the tough and tender skin of a street kid, the glitter swirling over it like the sparkle of guardian fairies, a blunt mercurial red softened with blessed unguents and essential oils, a green like a dying dollar bill unrolling into music and talisman... a solitary ray, bare as a ghost.”

Poet Bernadette Mayer responded to Cain’s paintings by saying, “it’s like seeing a rainbow in the middle of the forest.”

Cain described her paintings as “about the collision of various forms of space: physical, emotional and psychic,” and emphasized their evolution over time: “The work tells me how to make it... I need the piece to get lost before it is found.”

Cain's titles—such as Now I’m Going to Tell You Everything and My Favorite Season is the Fall of the Patriarchy—align her with a lineage of feminist poetics. And she often refers to feminist figures in the titles of her works, from pop culture, politics, and art. According to the Henry Art Gallery, Cain “redefines abstraction in feminist terms as an architecture for transformative, embodied, emotive experience,” and “intentionally subverts male-dominated art historical traditions by insisting on the value of feminine, queer, and othered aesthetics.”

== Selected exhibitions ==
=== Solos ===
- 2025 – Tell The Poets, Honor Fraser, Los Angeles, CA
- 2024 – The Path of Totality, Spotlight Series, FLAG Art Foundation, New York, NY
- 2024 – Quiet Riot, Anthony Meier, Mill Valley, CA
- 2023 – This is the thing they called life, Orange Barrel Media, Columbus, OH
- 2023 – Sarah Cain, Henry Art Gallery, Seattle, WA
- 2023 – Sarah Cain, Broadway Gallery, New York, NY
- 2022 – Hand In Hand, Colby Museum of Art, Waterville, ME
- 2021 – My Favorite Season is the Fall of the Patriarchy, National Gallery of Art
- 2021 – Enter the Center, Tang Teaching Museum, Saratoga Springs, NY
- 2021 – In Nature, The Momentary, Crystal Bridges Museum, Bentonville, AR
- 2020 – The Possibility of Overcoming Negative Thought, Vielmetter, Los Angeles
- 2019 – The Sun Will Not Wait, Honor Fraser, Los Angeles
- 2018 – Wild Flower, Timothy Taylor, London, UK
- 2017 – Now I’m Going to Tell You Everything, Institute of Contemporary Art, Los Angeles
- 2015 – The Imaginary Architecture of Love, Contemporary Art Museum, Raleigh, NC
- 2015 – Blue in Your Body, Red When It Hits the Air, Museum of Contemporary Art San Diego, CA
- 2013 – Mountain Song, Aspen Art Museum, CO

=== Group Exhibitions ===
- 2022 – 13 Women, Orange County Museum of Art, Costa Mesa, California
- 2021 – Permanent Collections, Blanton Museum of Art, Austin, Texas
- 2019 – Driving Forces: Contemporary Art from the Collection of Ann and Ron Pizzuti, Columbus Museum of Art, Columbus, Ohio
- 2015 – In ___ We Trust: Art and Money, Columbus Museum of Art, Columbus, Ohio
- 2014 – Variations: Conversations In and Around Abstract Painting, Los Angeles County Museum of Art, Los Angeles, California
- 2013 – Outside the Lines, Contemporary Arts Museum, Houston, Texas
- 2012 – Made in L.A., Hammer Museum and LAXART, Los Angeles, California
- 2012 – Gold, Imperial Belvedere Palace Museum, Vienna, Austria
- 2012 – Stretching Painting, Galerie Lelong, New York, New York
- 2011 – Two Schools of Cool, Orange County Museum of Art, Newport Beach, California
- 2010 – Feather Throat, Grimmuseum, Berlin, Germany
- 2008 – California Biennial, Orange County Museum of Art, Newport Beach, California
- 2007 – SECA Art Award Exhibition, San Francisco Museum of Modern Art, San Francisco, California
- 2006 – Busan Biennale, Busan, Korea

== Public collections ==
Cain's work is held in:

- Blanton Museum of Art, The University of Texas, Austin, Texas
- Los Angeles County Museum of Art, Los Angeles, California
- Pérez Art Museum Miami, Miami, Florida
- Pizzuti Collection, Columbus, Ohio
- Museum of Contemporary Art San Diego, San Diego, California
- North Carolina Museum of Art, Raleigh, North Carolina
- San Antonio Museum of Art, San Antonio, Texas
- San Francisco Museum of Modern Art, San Francisco, California
- Tang Teaching Museum and Art Gallery, Saratoga, New York
- The FLAG Art Foundation, New York, New York
- Moody Center for the Arts, Rice University, Houston, Texas
- Museum of Fine Arts, Boston, Massachusetts
- UBS Art Collection, New York, New York
- Zabludowicz Collection, London, United Kingdom
