= Avish Khebrehzadeh =

Iranian-born American painter, video artist, photographer (born 1969)

- آویش خبره زاده
- Born: 1969 (age 55–56); Tehran, Pahlavi Iran
- Education: Azad University, Accademia di Belle Arti di Roma, Corcoran School, University of the District of Columbia
- Occupation: Multidisciplinary visual artist
- Known for: Painting, drawing, photography, video art, installation art
- Awards: Young Italian Art Award (2003)
- Website: www.avishkz.com

Avish Khebrehzadeh (Persian: آویش خبره زاده; born 1969) is an Iranian and American multidisciplinary visual artist, known for her work in painting, drawing, video art, installation art and photography. She lives in Washington, D.C..

== Life and career ==
Avish Khebrehzadeh was born in 1969, in Tehran, Pahlavi Iran.

She attended schools at Azad University (now Islamic Azad University; 1990–1991), Tehran, Iran; Accademia di Belle Arti di Roma (1992–1996); Corcoran School of the Arts and Design (1997–1998) in Washington, D.C.; and the University of the District of Columbia (1998–1999) in Washington, D.C..

Her awards include the Young Italian Art Award (2003) at the 50th Venice Biennale in the Venice Pavilion, Venice, Italy. Khebrehzadeh's artwork is in museum collections, including at the Rhode Island School of Design Museum in Providence, Rhode Island; the National Gallery of Art in Washington, D.C.; and the MAXXI museum in Rome, Italy.

== Exhibitions ==
=== Solo exhibitions ===
- 2021, Seven Silent Songs, National Gallery of Art, Washington, D.C., United States
- 2009, Solace, So Old, So New, Fort Worth Contemporary Arts at Texas Christian University, Fort Worth, Texas, United States

=== Group exhibition ===
- 2015, ArtInternational 2015, group exhibition, Istanbul, Turkey; 87 galleries from 27 countries, presenting works by 400 artists
- 2004, Mediterraneans, group exhibition, Museum of Contemporary Art of Rome, Rome, Italy

== See also ==
- List of Iranian women artists
