= Katy Grannan =

American photographer and filmmaker

Katy Grannan (born 1969) is an American photographer and filmmaker. She made the feature-length film, The Nine. Her work is held in the collections of the Metropolitan Museum of Art, Museum of Modern Art, Solomon R. Guggenheim Museum, and Whitney Museum of American Art.

== Education ==
Grannan was born in Arlington, Massachusetts. She earned her humanities BA from The University of Pennsylvania, MA from Harvard University and her MFA in Photography from Yale School of Art in 1999.

== Career ==
Grannan's work has appeared in The New York Times Magazine, and was included in the 2004 Whitney Biennial. In 2012, Grannan's work was featured in the exhibition The Sun and Other Stars: Katy Grannan and Charlie White at the Los Angeles County Museum of Art. She has also recently taken a portrait of President Barack Obama for The New York Times.

Her preference to photograph strangers began while she was still at Yale School of Art, when she placed newspaper advertisements asking for "people for portraits". In her "Dream America" series, volunteers sometimes posed nude and often chose to pose in vacant lots or rooms with low ceilings. Writing in The New Yorker Andrea Scott called the portraits "an alloy of vulnerability, bravado, and nerves," and a view of the American dream turned inside out. In other work, Grannan photographed people in their homes and focused on the way their environments—furniture or aspects of private life—illuminated people's character. This work culminated in the monograph The Model American.

For her series Boulevard, Grannan was influenced by her new surroundings in California. She would photograph strangers in Los Angeles and San Francisco against stark white walls as a backdrop. Each photograph is the result of an on-the-spot collaboration, made with the willing participation of her subjects, who she compensates for their time. She befriended several of the subjects and made a video piece called "The Believers" with them Speaking of her Modesto photography, Grannan said that she was inspired by a childhood best friend who lived in the streets as a teenager and died in her 20s; Grannan spoke of her photographs not so much as activism but as a mutual flow of connections and generosity.

Grannan is influenced by the work of photographers such as Diane Arbus and Nan Goldin. Sean O'Hagan, reviewing her 2009 London exhibition The Westerns, described her work as "never less than intriguing" with "an otherworldliness here that sets her apart from her influences."

== Film ==
Shot over three years on South Ninth Street or "The Nine", the film is a feature-length portrait of a small community of outliers living on a blighted street in a marginalized part of California.

== Personal ==
Grannan grew up in Arlington, Massachusetts. She has three children and lives in Berkeley, California. She moved to Humboldt County CA in 2023

== Books ==
- Katy Grannan: Model American. New York: Aperture, 2005. ISBN 1-931788-81-2.
- The Westerns: Katy Grannan. San Francisco: Fraenkel Gallery. 2007. ISBN 978-1-881337-24-9.
- Katy Grannan:Boulevard. San Francisco: Fraenkel Gallery. 2011. ISBN 1881337294.

== Collections ==
Grannan's work is held in the following permanent collections:

- Metropolitan Museum of Art
- Museum of Modern Art, New York: 5 prints (as of April 2021)
- Solomon R. Guggenheim Museum
- Whitney Museum of American Art
