= George Bures Miller =

Canadian artist

- Imbalance.6 (Escape Velocity), 1998, mixed media with compressed air, pneumatic pistons, electronic circuit
- Born: 1960 (age 65–66); Vegreville, Alberta, Canada
- Education: Ontario College of Art, University of Alberta
- Known for: Sculptor, installation artist, electronic artist
- Notable work: Paradise Institute, 2001 (with Janet Cardiff)
- Spouse: Janet Cardiff

George Bures Miller (born 1960) is a Canadian artist known for his collaborative works with his wife Janet Cardiff. Miller and Cardiff represented Canada at the 2001 Venice Biennale. They are based in British Columbia, Canada.

== Works with Janet Cardiff ==
Paradise Institute (2001) Janet Cardiff and George Bures Miller

Bures Miller and Cardiff represented Canada at the 49th Venice Biennale with their work "Paradise Institute" (2001), which featured a 16-seat movie theatre where viewers watched a film. The audience became entangled as witnesses to a possible crime played out both in the real-world audience and on the screen. For their innovative approach, the artists were awarded the La Biennale di Venezia Special Award, marking the first time it was presented to Canadian artists, as well as the Benesse Prize, recognizing their experimental and pioneering spirit.

Cardiff and Bures Miller have also showcased their works in various exhibitions, including at Fraenkel Gallery, San Francisco (2018), Modern Art Oxford (2008), the Fruitmarket Gallery, Edinburgh, Scotland (2008) Vancouver Art Gallery (2005), Luhring Augustine, New York (2004), Contemporary Arts Center, Cincinnati (2003), Art Gallery of Ontario (2002), National Gallery of Canada (2002) and Oakville Galleries, Oakville, Ontario (2000).

After Janet’s first audio walk in 1991, when she was on a residency at the Banff Centre in Alberta, Canada, he and Janet started co-creating the Walks series, audio and video walks in locations around the world. Examples like Alter Bahnhof Video Walk, which takes place in the old train station (Hauptbahnhof) in Kassel, Germany.

Thought Experiments in F# Minor, which take place in Walt Disney Concert Hall in downtown L.A.

Night Walk for Edinburgh, which takes place in Old Town, Edinburgh, Scotland.

Alter Bahnhof Video Walk was also designed for dOCUMENTA 13. They also published the book “Janet Cardiff and George Bures Miller: Night Walk for Edinburgh”, layering together production photographs, video stills, scripts, and shooting instructions to show their working process.

== Publications ==
- Cardiff, Janet and George Bures Miller. The Killing Machine and Other stories 1995 - 2007. Texts by Ralph Beil and Bartomeo Mari and other authors. MACBA Barcelona and Mathildenhohe Darmstadt, 2007. ISBN 978-3-7757-2002-1
- Cardiff, Janet and George Bures Miller. Janet Cardiff & George Bures Miller: Louisiana Contemporary. Michael Juul Holm and Mette Marcus (eds). Louisiana Museum of Modern Art, Denmark, 2006. ISBN 87-91607-32-9
- Cardiff, Janet and George Bures Miller. The Secret Hotel. Janet Cardiff + George Bures Miller. Kunsthaus Bregenz and Eckgard Schneider (eds). Buchhandlung Walther Koenig, 2005. ISBN 3-86560-014-X
- Cardiff, Janet and George Bures Miller. Janet Cardiff & George Bures Miller – Venice Biennial – The Paradise Institute. Texts by Wayne Baerwald. Buchhandlung Walther Koenig, 2001. ISBN 0-921381-23-9
- Miller, George Bures. George Bures Miller – Simple Experiments in Aerodynamics: 6 & 7. Texts by Wayne Baerwaldt & Dana Samuel. Toronto: Mercer Union, A Centre for Contemporary Art, 2001. ISBN 0-921527-41-1

== General references ==
- Smith, Roberta. "Janet Cardiff and George Bures Miller." The New York Times (March 2004): E33.
