= Mariko Mori =

Japanese artist (born 1967)

Mariko Mori 森 万里子
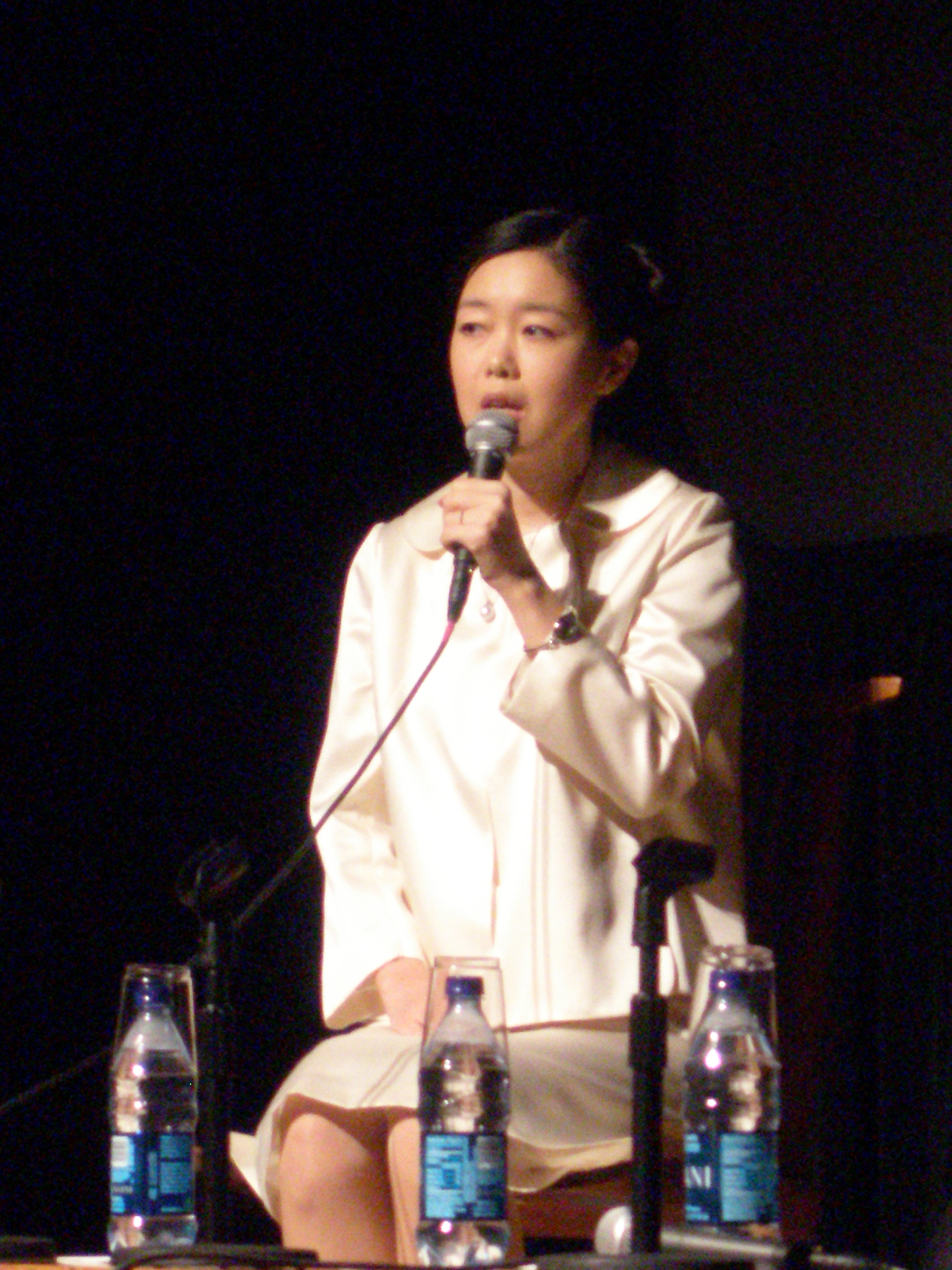
- Mariko Mori at the Japan Society Panel on Art & Nature on 2010
- Born: 森 万里子; February 21, 1967 (age 59); Tokyo, Japan
- Education: Byam Shaw School of Art; Chelsea College of Art and Design
- Known for: Photography, Digital art, Sculpture
- Movement: Contemporary Art, Pop Art, Environmental Art

Mariko Mori (森 万里子, Mori Mariko; born 1967) is a Japanese multidisciplinary artist. She is known for her photographs and videos of her hybridized future self, often presented in various guises and featuring traditional Japanese motifs. Her work often explores themes of technology, spirituality and transcendence.

In 2010, she founded the Faou Foundation, an art nonprofit based in New York City.

== Early life and education ==
Mariko Mori was born in Tokyo, Japan in 1967. She comes from a wealthy family; her father is an inventor and technician, and her mother is a historian of European Art. She is the niece of Minoru Mori.

While studying at Bunka Fashion College in Tokyo in the late 1980s, Mori worked as a fashion model. In 1989, she moved to London to study at the Byam Shaw School of Art and then the Chelsea College of Art and Design, from where she graduated in 1992. After graduating, she moved to New York City and participated in the Whitney Independent Study Program at the Whitney Museum of American Art.

== Career ==
Mori's early work references traditional Japanese culture and ancient history but is characterized by futuristic themes and characters. Her early photography is heavily influenced by cosplay. Fantastic deities, robots, alien creatures and spaceships are featured in videos and photographs with the artist herself dressed up in various self-made costumes as characters. Present throughout her career is a fascination with technology and spirituality, with technology as a means of transcending and transforming consciousness and self.

Mori's early works, such as photograph Play with Me (1994), use her own body as the subject, and she costumes herself as a sexualized, technological alien woman in everyday scenes. While her tableaus are fantastic and futuristic, the role played by the female characters she portrayed were often traditional, gendered roles such as a waitress in Tea Ceremony (1995), a futuristic version of the female Buddhist deity Kichijoten in Pure Land (1996-1998), or a female Japanese pop star in Birth of a Star.

Mori attributes her fascination with consciousness and death to experiencing sleep paralysis in her early-twenties for several hours which left her unsure if she was alive or dead.

The juxtaposition of Eastern mythology with Western culture is a common theme in Mori's works, often through layering photography and digital imaging, such as in her 1995 installation Birth of a Star. Later works, such as Nirvana show her as a goddess, transcending her early roles via technology and image, and abandoning realistic urban scenes for more alien landscapes.

At the 47th Venice Biennale (1997), Mori had two works exhibited, a photo collage titled, Empty Dream (1995) shown in the Japanese Pavillon, and the 3-D video installation, Nirvana (1997) which was shown in the Nordic Pavillon.

Mori's work is featured in many public museum collections, including the Solomon R. Guggenheim Museum, Los Angeles County Museum of Art (LACMA), Museum of Contemporary Art, Chicago, and others.

== Personal life ==
She is married to composer Ken Ikeda. They have created collaborative work together, with Ikeda composing music and/or sound for many of Mori's pieces.

== Work ==
=== Play with Me (1994) ===
Mariko Mori's Installation and Photographic works, like Play with Me (1994), for instance, implement prominent themes of the "sexual," or "kawaii" stereotypes of a beautiful Japanese woman in society, as well as the entertainment industry. In Play with Me, Standing outside a Tokyo toy store, Mori dressed herself as a cyborg—with light blue hair in long ponytails, metallic blue hard-shell plastic top, silver plastic gloves, and a dress. Mori dresses similarly to the toys sold inside the store, while being ignored by the patrons who are entering to her left. She is seemingly trying to entice the men using her sexual appearance, yet the men don't seem to notice her, and go straight to the video game arcade that is behind her instead. Mori is in a clearly objectified manner, similar to female anime and video game characters. This theme of the infantilization, exploitation, and sexualization of women in entertainment is a prominent issue Mori is challenging in most of her works, and Play with Me, implements these themes and motifs crucially.

Another theme that rises throughout Mori's works is prominence of the effects that Anime and Manga have on post war Japanese society, especially shy young men, also known as otaku, and the concept of the "ideal Japanese woman".Play With Me’s can be seen as a commentary on a type of "isolation" between Japanese men and women, with men preferring fake "Kawaii" anime women over real women in society. In Play with Me, Mori is challenging this otaku culture through her portrayal of a seductive characterization of a young anime or manga female character portrayed throughout Japanese pop culture and mass media. In addition, the availability of new technological advancements in post-Bubble era Japan also made this desire possible. Overall, Mariko Mori portrays herself as these overly sensualized characters, depicting Idoru ideals utilizing her body symbolically to depict women exploited in media, culture, and society, because of gender, and its qualities and notions of science fiction in Japanese pop culture.

=== Subway (1994) ===
Mori stood in a Tokyo subway car dressed as if she just landed from outer space. She was dressed in a silver metallic costume with a headset, microphone, and push-buttons on her forearm. This transformation—along with Play With Me—was to explore different constructed identities.

=== Empty Dream (1995) ===
Mori manipulates a photo of a real public swimming place as she inserts herself in a blue plastic mermaid costume in several locations within the scene. This image refers to, among other things, the rising of technology and philosophy around the creation of man through biotechnology. This work was one of two by Mori that were featured at the 47th Venice Biennale (1997).

=== Oneness (2003) ===
Oneness, which was first exhibited at Deitch Projects, New York, in 2003, is also the title of a group of six alien sculptures—made from soft, skin-like material—that hold each other’s hands in a circle. They are sensitive to human touch, lighting up when hugged. Oneness explores issues such as spirituality, photography, fashion, artistic originality and the use of technology.

Including in Oneness you can find some sub-works such as the Wave-UFO, a 6.000 kg dome where the visitor, once inside it, can see projected paintings reworked with computer graphics and then transformed into photographs in the interior dome of the Wave UFO. Conceptualization and prototyping of the Wave UFO was realized during Mori's residency at Eyebeam Art+Technology Center in Chelsea, New York.

=== Rebirth ===
Rebirth is an exhibition from works spanning a number of years that was first shown in London at the Royal Academy of Art in 2012 and came to Japan Society in New York City in 2013. It is seen as a major departure from her previous work in that has far less to do with contemporary media and influences. One such example in this collection is Flat Stones (2006), which is a collection of ceramic rocks arranged similarly to a Jomon archaeological site. Mori also took inspiration from ancient Celtic practices, notably the stone circles in her Transcircle 1.1 (2004), a group of LED lit columns that periodically shift color. Such engagement with prehistoric cultures derive from her search for universal values shared by humanity.

== Faou Foundation ==
In 2010, Mori founded a 501(c)(3) non-profit organization, the Faou Foundation, (the word "faou" is a neologism created by Mori meaning "creative force"). Mori is listed as founder and president of the organization. Inspired by Buddhism and ecology, the Faou Foundation's mission is to create six art installations around the world as homages to the natural environment of each locale.

So far, Faou Foundation has created 2 projects of six projects:

•Primal Rhythm = Premiered in 2011, Miyako Island, Okinawa, Japan. It is a monument with two large sculptures:

-Sun Pillar: 4.2 meters tall, weighing 2.9 tons, a column set atop a rock promontory. It reflects the colors of the sea and sky and casts shadow across the bay each winter solstice.

-Moon Stone: a translucent sphere that changes color by the tides of the sea.

On the winter solstice each year, the shadow of the Sun Pillar will reach the Moon Stone, serving as, Mori writes: "a ceremonial emblem of eternal rebirth for all living things."

•Ring: One with Nature = Premiered in August 2016, it is 2 ton weighing, 3 meters-diameter giant acrylic ring. It is on permanent view atop a waterfall called "Véu da Noiva", in Cunhambebe State Park, Muriqui, Brazil. The color of the ring is changed by the sun, from hues of blue to gold.

== Awards and honors ==
- 1997 – Menzione d’onore, for her work Nirvana (1997), Venice Biennale
- 2001 – 8th Annual Award as a "Promising Artist and Scholar in the Field of Contemporary Japanese Art", Japan Cultural Arts Foundation

== Publications ==
- Tezuka, Miwako; Sakurai, Motoatsu (2013). Rebirth: Recent Work by Mariko Mori. Japan Society. ISBN 978-0300196887.
- Eccles, Tom; Schneider, Eckhard; Mori, Mariko (2004). Mariko Mori: Wave UFO. Bregenz, Austria: Kunsthaus Bregenz. ISBN 978-3883757216.
- Celant, Germano; Nakazawa, Shin Ichi; Mori, Mariko (1999). Mariko Mori – Dream Temple. Milan, Italy: Fondazione Prada. ISBN 978-8887029116.
