= Cynthia Daignault =

American artist

- Born: 1978 (age 47–48); Baltimore, Maryland, U.S.
- Education: Stanford University
- Occupations: artist, writer, curator, musician
- Known for: painting
- Website: cynthiadaignault.com

Cynthia Daignault (born 1978) is an American painter. Her work is often described as rigorous and intense. Daignault is also a writer and musician and curator. She lives and works in Brooklyn, New York.

== Biography ==
Daignault was born and grew up in Baltimore, Maryland. She attended Stanford University and graduated with distinctions and honors and a BA degree in 2001. Instead of pursuing an MFA degree, as many modern American painters often do, Daignault chose to work with established artists, including Kara Walker, in more traditional models of mentorship.

== Art ==
Daignault's process of painting relies less on exact visual realism, than on ideas and feelings. She works with light and time and strives towards a sense of the universal. She feels that painted objects are like "concrete word poetry" and she has been called "a poet of a painter" by the New Yorker. Often her works exist in the divide between abstraction and figuration.

Daignault's paintings are often installed in series. The work, I love you more than one more day (2013) consists of 365 small oil canvases. This piece was described as lyrical and existing on the "verge of transcendence."

Daignault took a few years to paint alone in the woods. She has said that the experience strengthened her resolve as an artist and that painting is her "life's practice."

Daignault’s “Light Atlas,” 2016, consists of 360 small paintings documenting the perimeter of the continental United States. The work was inspired by the artist’s realization that she could name 100 men who roamed the country to create canonical works that have defined America, yet she could not name one such woman. Traversing more than 30,000 miles, across forests, deserts, mountains, and fields, Daignault traveled the road for a year. She stopped every twenty-seven miles to sketch and photograph the landscape. This work is an immersive, room-size work that is exhibited at the Hudson River Museum till Fall 2021.

In November 2020, the Dallas Art Fair Foundation has announced it has gifted two artworks from the Dallas Art Fair's Four x Five exhibition to two major Dallas museums. One of them was Daignault's painting, Elegy (Los Angeles, 2019) acquired by the Dallas Museum of Art (DMA)for its permanent collection.

== Books ==
Daignault is also a published art writer and editor, including the monograph "Improbable History" about painter Sean Landers published by JRP|Ringier in the Fall of 2011, and the founder and editor of the publication A-Z.

In 2019, the book referencing her work Light Atlas was published.

=== Awards ===
- Rema Hort Mann Foundation, grant (2011)
- MacDowell Colony, fellow (2010)
- White Columns, curated artist registry (2009)

== See also ==
- Elisheva Biernoff – another MacDowell fellow, from whom Daignault accidentally appropriated in 2015 before publicly acknowledging her error and apologising the same day.
