= Janet Cardiff =

Canadian artist (born 1957)

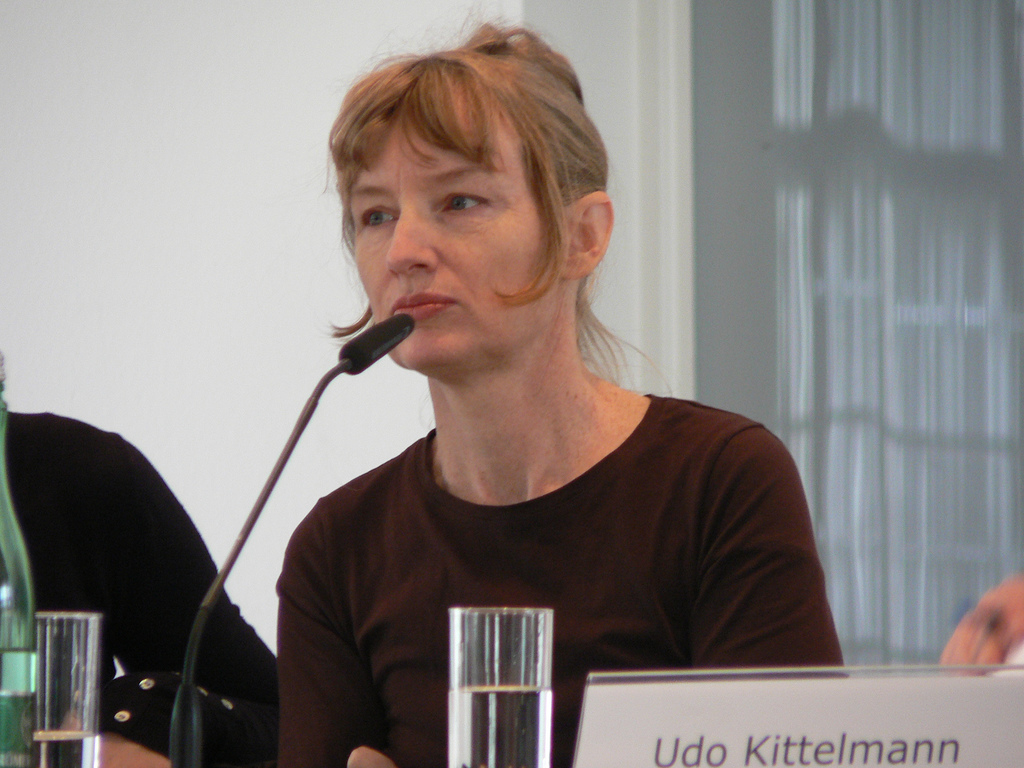
- Cardiff in Berlin, Germany in March 2009.
- Born: March 15, 1957 (age 69); Brussels, Ontario, Canada
- Education: Queen's University, University of Alberta
- Known for: sound artist, installation artist
- Notable work: "Forty Part Motet", 2001; Paradise Institute, 2001, with George Bures Miller
- Movement: Conceptual Art
- Spouse: George Bures Miller
- Awards: National Gallery of Canada Millennium Prize; La Biennale di Venezia Special Award; the Benesse Prize; the Wilhelm Lehmbruck Prize
- Years active: 1995–present

Janet Cardiff (born March 15, 1957) is a Canadian artist who works chiefly with sound and sound installations, often in collaboration with her husband and partner George Bures Miller. Cardiff first gained international recognition in the art world for her audio walks in 1995. She lives and works in British Columbia, Canada.

== Early life and education ==
Janet Cardiff was born in 1957 in Brussels, Ontario, Canada, and grew up on a farm outside of a small village. In 1980, she earned her BFA from Queens University, Kingston, Ontario. In 1983, she earned an MVA from the University of Alberta, Edmonton, Alberta, Canada. While studying in Edmonton, she met George Bures Miller who would become her husband and collaborator. Cardiff's training is in photography and printmaking and her early works were large-scale silkscreens. Her first artistic collaboration with Bures Miller, in 1983, was a Super-8 film called The Guardian Angel. After this filmmaking experience, Cardiff's work began to include elements of narrative sequencing, experiments with sound, and movement.

== Solo works ==
Her first major work based on recorded sound was called The Whispering Room, a minimal work consisting of a dark space with 16 small round speakers mounted on stands that play the voice of individual characters. As visitors move through the space and the voices, a film projector is triggered playing a slightly slow-motion film.

Some of Cardiff's most well-known solo works are her audio walks. Her first was created somewhat serendipitously during a residency at the Banff Centre in 1991. In 1996, she was asked to create a site-specific piece for the museum grounds at Louisiana Museum in Denmark. Since then, she has created notable walks such as Her Long Black Hair (2004), in and around Central Park, and Words Drawn in Water (2005) for the Hirshhorn Museum.

Cardiff has been included in exhibitions such as Present Tense, Nine Artists in the Nineties, San Francisco Museum of Modern Art, NowHere, Louisiana Museum, Denmark, The Museum as Muse, Museum of Modern Art, the Carnegie International '99/00, the Tate Modern Opening Exhibition as well as a project commissioned by Artangel in London. This project ("The Missing Voice (Case Study B)") was commissioned in 1999 and continues to run. It is an audio tour that leaves from the Whitechapel Library, next to the Whitechapel tube stop and snakes its way through London's East End, weaving fictional narrative with descriptions about the actual landscape. Cardiff represented Canada at the São Paulo Art Biennial in 1998, and at the 6th Istanbul Biennial in 1999 with her partner George Bures Miller.

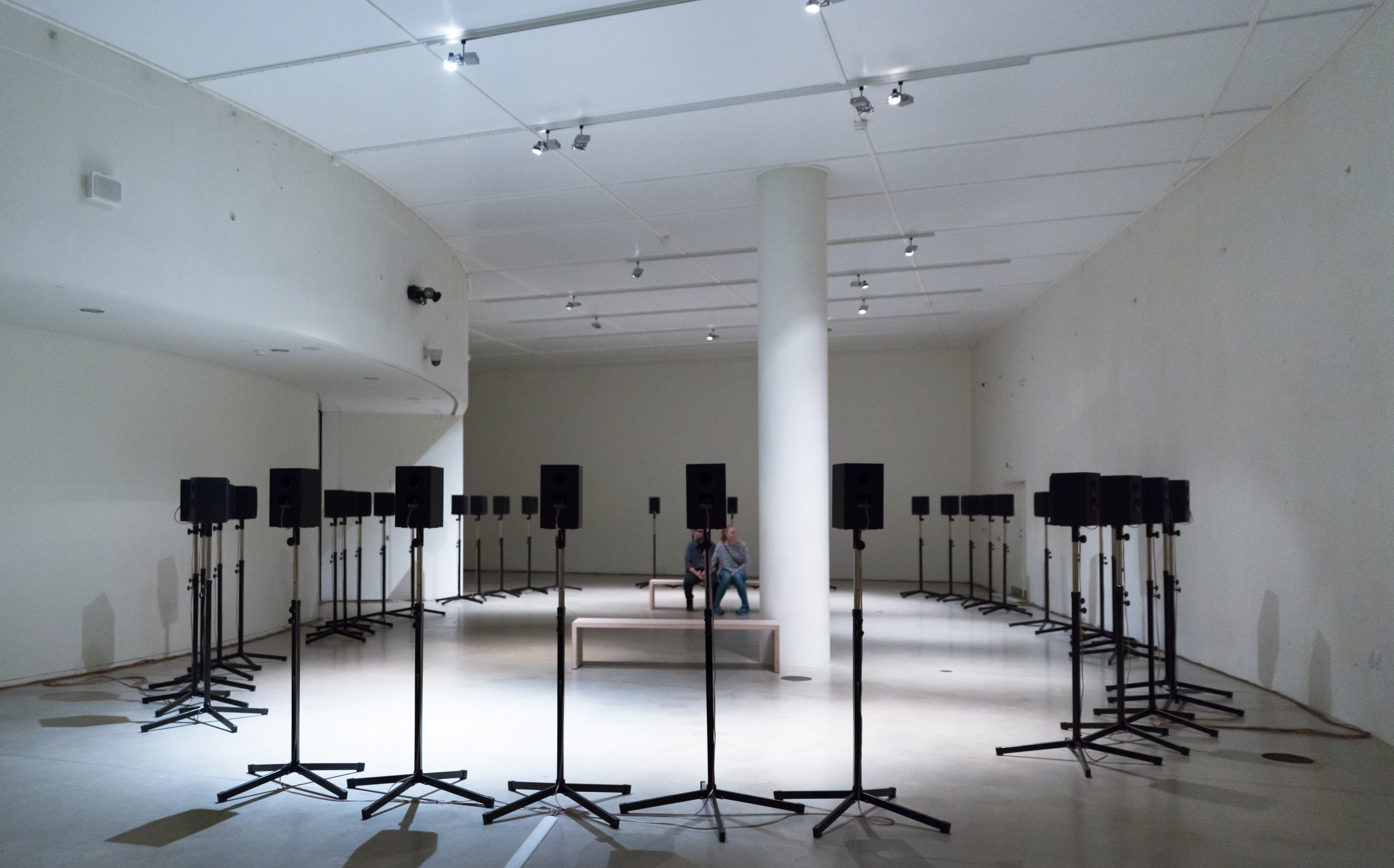
Forty Part Motet, Photograph © Villy Fink Isaksen, Wikimedia Commons, License cc-by-sa-3.0

In her Forty Part Motet (2001) she placed 40 speakers in 8 groups, each speaker playing a recording of one voice singing Thomas Tallis' Spem in alium, enabling the audience to walk through the space and "sample" individual voices of the polyphonic vocal music. This work is now part of the permanent collection of the National Gallery of Canada in Ottawa, Ontario, Canada., the Museum of Modern Art in New York City, and of Inhotim in Brumadinho, Brazil. This work was presented at The Cloisters, September to December 2013, that museum's first presentation of contemporary art. The work was installed in the Fuentidueña Chapel, which features the late twelfth-century apse from the church of San Martín at Fuentidueña, near Segovia, Spain, providing a transformed acoustic experience.

A mid-career retrospective, Janet Cardiff: A Survey of Works, Including Collaborations with George Bures Miller, opened at P.S. 1 Contemporary Art Center, Long Island City, Queens, in 2001 and has travelled to Montréal, Oslo, and Turin. Exhibitions in 2006 include Good Vibrations–Le arti visive e il Rock, Palazzo delle Papesse, Centro Arte Contemporanea, Siena; Anticipation, The Museum of Contemporary Photography, Chicago; and Sonic Presence, Bergen Kunsthall, Bergen, Norway.

In Real Time (1999) was the very first video walk that Cardiff created. It took place in the library of the Carnegie Museum of Art and begins with the participant donning a pair of headphones attached to a small video camera. Upon playback Cardiff says to watch the screen and follow along with what we see and hear for approximately 18 minutes. This piece relies on the discrepancies between what is seen on the video monitor and what is occurring in the library.

== Work with George Bures Miller ==
"The Dark Pool" was the first multimedia installation collaboration Cardiff and Miller created and showed in 1995 in Vancouver. The work consists of a dimly lit room, furnished with cardboard, carpets, and collected ephemera and artifacts, through which visitors move, triggering sounds such as musical segments, portions of conversations, and bits of stories. Cardiff and Miller consider the work very personal and, despite offers, have not sold it. Cardiff and Bures Miller represented Canada at the 49th Venice Biennale with Paradise Institute (2001), a 16-seat movie theatre where viewers watched a film, becoming entangled as witnesses to a possible crime played out in the real world audience and on the screen. Cardiff and Bures Miller have recently had exhibitions at Fraenkel Gallery, San Francisco (2018), the Art Gallery of Alberta (2010), Fruitmarket Gallery, Edinburgh, Scotland (2008) the Miami Art Museum (2007) Vancouver Art Gallery (2005), Luhring Augustine, New York (2004), Contemporary Arts Center, Cincinnati (2003), Art Gallery of Ontario (AGO) (2002), National Gallery of Canada (2002) and Oakville Galleries, Oakville, Ontario (2000). In 2012, she took part along with her husband in the Kassel's Documenta. They proposed two installations: the first one is an audio installation in the forest called Forest (for a thousand years…) of a 28-minute audio loop. The second one is a 26-minute video walk specially produced for Documenta and called Alter Bahnhof video walk, where the immersive installation takes place at the old train station (Hauptbahnhof) in Kassel, Germany. In 2013, the Art Gallery of Ontario and Vancouver Art Gallery organized Lost in the Memory Palace: Janet Cardiff and George Bures Miller, a selected survey, which took as its focus Cardiff and Miller's work from the mid-1990s to 2013. Recent projects include Thought Experiments in F♯ Minor (2019), a site-specific, immersive, video installation at the Walt Disney Concert Hall in Los Angeles; and Cardiff & Miller (2019), a solo exhibition at Museo de Arte Contemporaneo de Monterrey in Mexico.

== Awards given jointly to Janet Cardiff and George Bures Miller ==
- National Gallery of Canada Millennium Prize (2001);
- La Biennale di Venezia Special Award at Venice, presented to Canadian artists for the first time (2001);
- the Benesse Prize, recognizing artists who break new artistic ground with an experimental and pioneering spirit (2001);
- the Käthe Kollwitz Prize, Germany (2011);
- the Wilhelm Lehmbruck Prize in honor of their life's work, which has "opened up new perspectives for sculpture in the twentieth and twenty-first centuries" (2020)

== See also ==
- Rideau Street Chapel
