= Wardell Milan =

New York City based visual artist

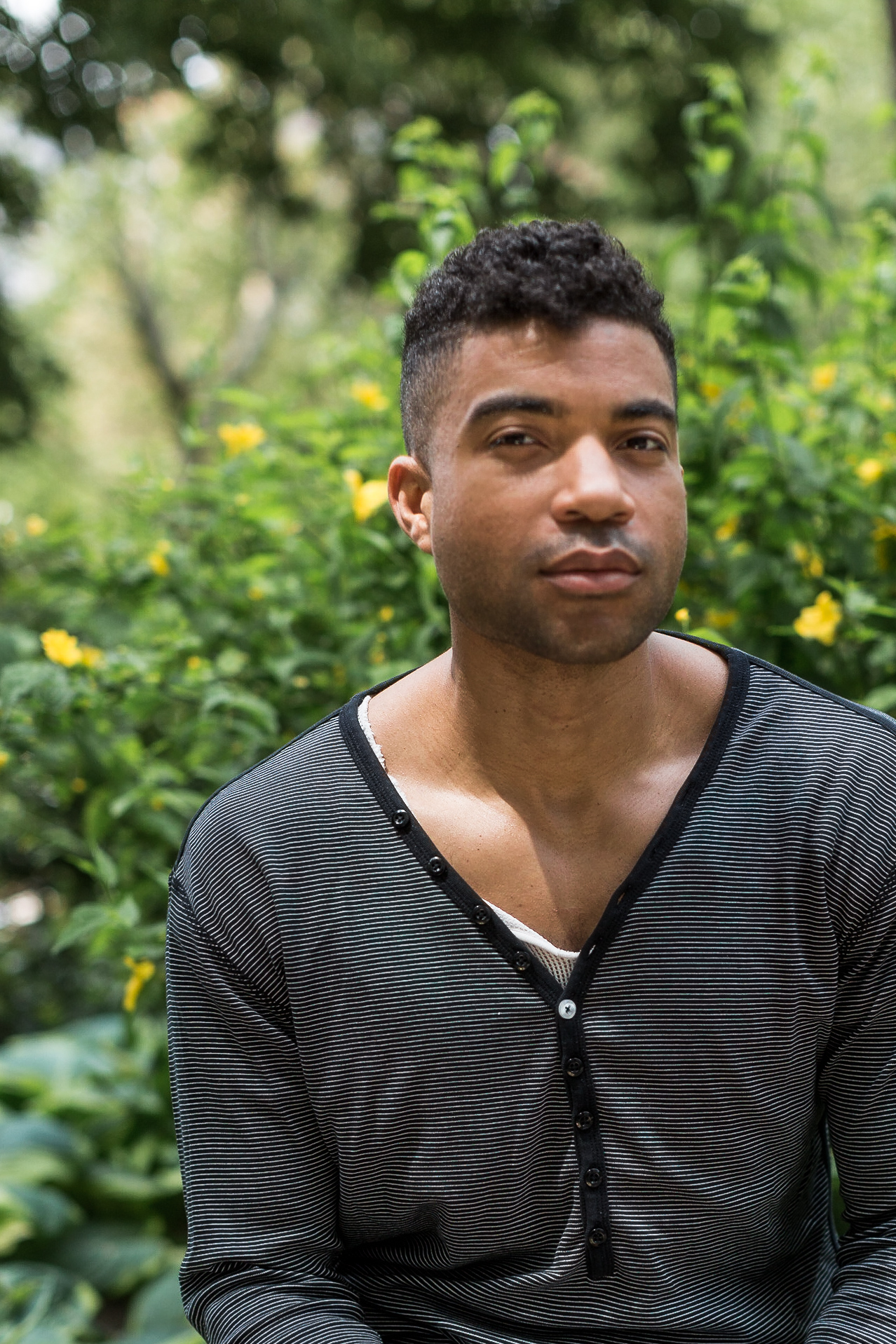
- Milan in 2016
- Born: 1978 (age 47–48); Knoxville, Tennessee
- Education: University of Tennessee; Yale School of Art
- Website: www.wardellmilan.com

Wardell Milan is an American visual artist residing in New York City. His work consists of drawing, painting, and photography, as well as constructing three-dimensional dioramas. According to the artist, he considers his work to be "visual narratives" that can be regarded as linear, or non-linear according to the way the viewer interprets each scene. He often appropriates photographs, and found objects in his work. He is inspired by literature, philosophy, and human nature. Milan has said the works of Tennessee Williams, Alice Walker, and James Baldwin have offered him insight in their story-telling abilities.

== Early life and career ==
Milan was born in 1977 in Knoxville, Tennessee, and it was here that he began to display his interest in art. His parents, Wardell Sr. and Linda Milan, provided a separate "studio space" in their home for him to work, while his teachers offered their encouragement throughout his high school education. Even though he is skilled in multiple mediums, as a teenager Milan focused primarily on photography. He earned his Bachelor of Fine Arts at the University of Tennessee in 2001. After earning his undergraduate degree, Milan was an artist in residence at the Skowhegan School of Painting and Sculpture in Skowhegan, Maine. He earned his Master of Fine Arts at Yale University in 2004, and soon after moved to New York.

== Work ==
Milan's choice in using a wide range in media also offers insight into Milan's interpretation on the themes of beauty and sexuality in contemporary society. Other themes such as personal identity and the body are seen, as he draws from sports culture, pornography, and fashion. In 2005 after attending graduate school, he exhibited Frequency at The Studio Museum in Harlem, Greater New York. The exhibition showcased Milan skills of using a wide range of mediums in his paintings, drawings and large scale montage-style photographs. In that same year, Milan's first show abroad was La Beaute de l'Enfer at the Galerie Rodolphne Janssen in Brussels.

The dioramas are three-dimensional constructions which Milan creates to photograph, and are presented as two-dimensional scenes. He never shows the physical constructions, but chooses to present the scenes at large scales. These dioramas often depict bizarre environments where objects and characters interact. Upon first glance the work appears to be digitally edited, but upon further investigation the viewer can see Milan's use of the camera. These scenes create spaces and "moments in time" that "would never exist".

His Boxing Series was inspired by the H.G Wells novel, The Invisible Man. Milan was specifically interested in the scene from the book, the Battle Royale. He paid close attention to the character and his placement in that narrative to visualize that specific moment. This series, upon other works, consists of appropriated photographs which he collaged. The photographs were used from the book, The Fights which consist of photography taken by Charles Huff. Milan was interested in using the book, not only for inspiration, but regarded it as his "canvas". This series paved the way for Milan's larger bodies of work which carries similar characteristics in visualizing narratives.

When describing his work in an article from Interview magazine, Wardell states: "I like this idea of creating duality of this uncomfortable shift for the viewer when they're looking at the work."

In 2012 Wardell Milan has been exhibiting selections from ongoing series of work on paper and photography. He showed A Series of Inspiring Women (2012) at the Louis B. James Gallery (10) in New York, Kingdom or Exile: Parisian Landscapes (2013) at Savannah College of Art and Design, and (Show Untitled) Parisian Landscapes (2014), curated by Isolde Brielmaier, at Osmos Address in New York. For his work he received a Foundation for Contemporary Arts Grants to Artists award (2014).
