= Marko Mäetamm =

Estonian artist

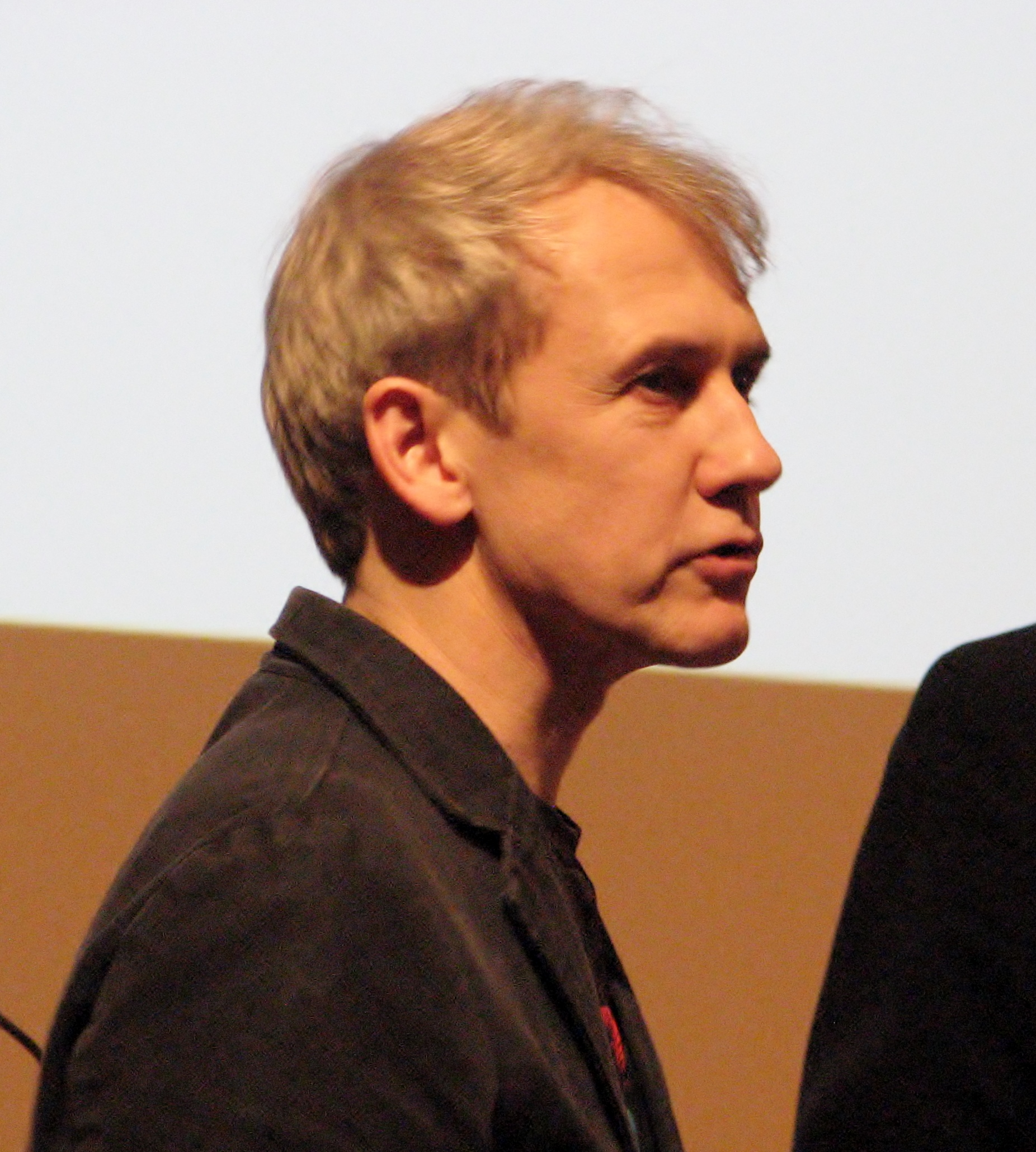
Marko Mäetamm in 2014

Marko Mäetamm (born 13 December 1965, in Viljandi, Estonia) is an Estonian multimedia artist, working within the mediums of video, drawing and the internet.

Mäetamm began studying graphic art at the Estonian Academy of Arts in 1988 and received his M.A. from the academy in 1996. Mäetamm also studied practicing print technologies at the Swedish Royal Art High School.

His professional art career spanning over two decades, Mäetamm emerged as one of the most prominent artists in Estonia upon graduating from Estonian Art Academy. Marko Mäetamm has exhibited internationally since the 1990s and represented Estonia at the 52nd Venice Bienniale in 2007 and in 2003 as a part of artists duo John Smith (with Kaido Ole) in the Estonian pavilion.

Throughout his practice, the artist's primary focus has been on family life, which he has explored though videos and paintings. Treating the family as a microcosm of a wider socio-political and economic models, Mäetamm collects petty every-day situations, presenting them filtered through a prism of his unmistakable dark humour. Partly inspired by his own private life, Mäetamm's work explores the grey area where ambiguous feelings of being in control and being controlled merge.

== Awards ==
- 2008 Order of the White Star V Class
- 2002 Painting's Prize of the Estonian Painter's Association.
- 2000 Kristjan Raud annual art award
- 2000 Harpoon. Annual art award of Vaal Gallery
- 1999 Stipendium of Cultural Endowment
- 1997 UNDP annual prize

== Books by Marko Mäetamm ==
- MARKO und KAIDO - Under the pen name "John Smith". Center for Contemporary Arts, Estonia. Tallinn, 2003
- Rääkivad majad - Speaking Houses. R/I/B/O/P, Tallinn, 2003

== References/External links ==
- Marko Mäetamm's Homepage
- Temnikova & Kasela gallery
- Marko Mäetamm's profile at Estonian Contemporary Art Center's webpage
- Interview with Marko Mäetamm, Arterritory.com
- Ikon Gallery, Birmingham
