= Kris Lemsalu =

Estonian artist

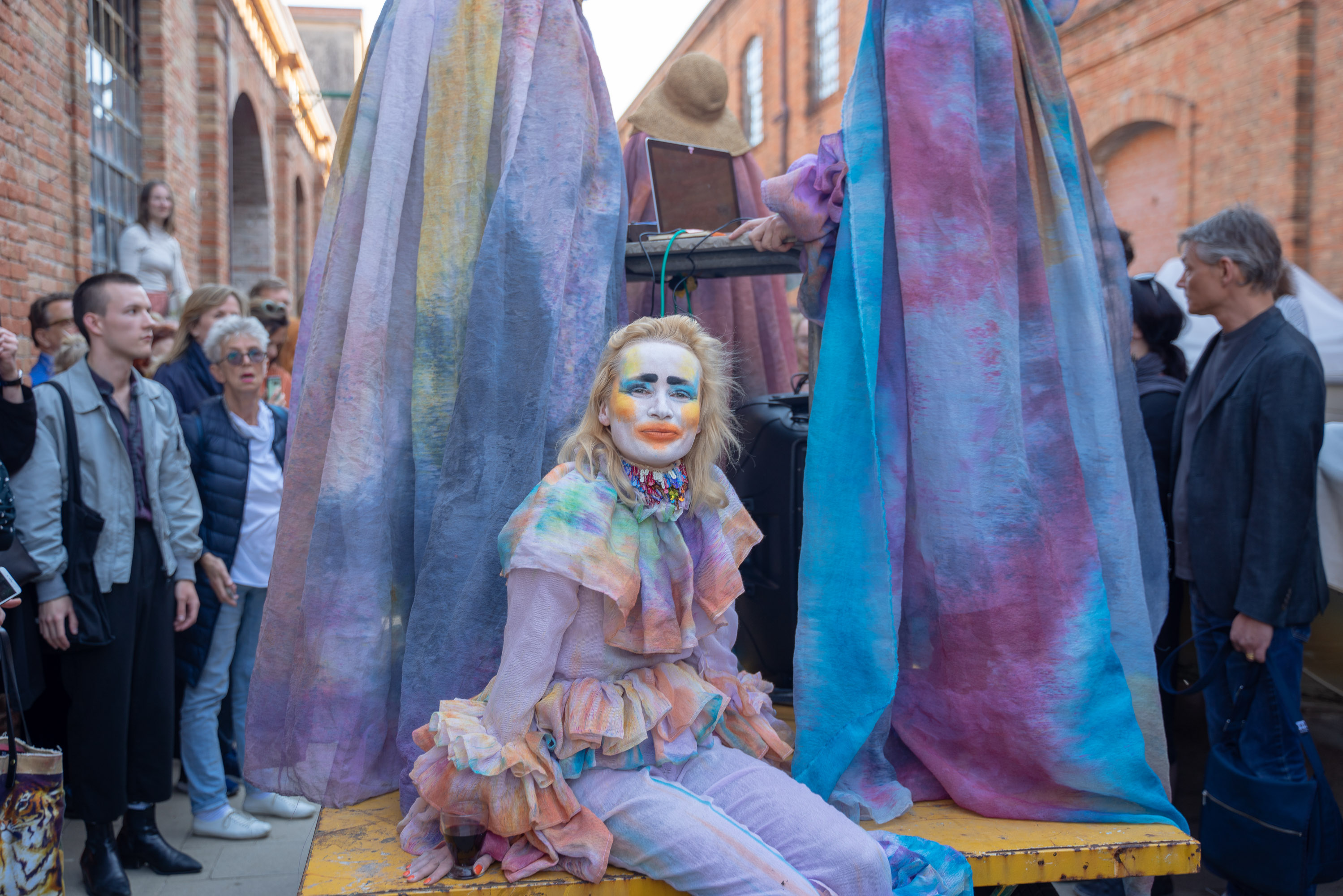
Kris Lemsalu at the opening of "Birth V – Hi and Bye", Estonian pavilion at Venice biennale, 2019. Photo by Kent Märjamaa, Estonian Centre for Contemporary Art.

Kris Lemsalu (born 1985, Tallinn) is a contemporary artist based in Tallinn, Estonia and Vienna, Austria. She studied art at the Estonian Academy of Arts, the Royal Danish Academy of Fine Arts, and the Academy of Fine Arts Vienna. Eccentric with color and material, she uses props, costumes, and other natural materials to portray her artwork. In these installations, Lemsalu sculpts an installation that "gives birth to a world of shamanic force, visionary weirdness, and collective revival." By playing with traditions, Lemsalu blurs the origin and scenically removes their dogma. She avoids "concrete labeling, simultaneously showing us the absurdity of as well as the effectiveness of rituals. From this collective transformative euphoria emerges a belief in the possibility of human redemption." "A punk pagan trickster feminist sci-fi shaman, Kris Lemsalu gathers together both collected and crafted objects into totemic sculptures and hallucinatory environments, animated with performances by the artist and her coterie of collaborators;" her work being shown in many places, including Berlin, Copenhagen and Tokyo. In 2015, she participated in Frieze Art Fair New York, where her work Whole Alone 2 was selected among of five best exhibits by the Frieze New York jury.

== Early life and education ==
Lemsalu attained a bachelor's degree in the ceramics department in 2008 at the Estonian Academy of Arts in Tallinn. During 2009–2010 she studied at The Royal Danish Academy of Fine Arts, Department of Design in Copenhagen, and during 2010–2014 at the Academy of Fine Arts Vienna. With this education, she developed a political approach in her art which centers "around the harmonious integration of the individual with their surroundings." Integrating her studies, Lemsalu can be found experimenting with traditional techniques to create multilayered works. Her staged installations combine delicate porcelain sculptures cast as animal and human body parts or objects of clothing with found natural materials like fur, leather or wool. Furthermore, her objects of choice mix sculpted ceramic parts and hand-sewn draping with all the matter in consumer society such as CDs, flowers, baskets, boots, clothes, balloons, car doors, pocket change, paint, etc. – with no end to the list. There is an accent in each of her pieces which is the focus of "a narrative haunted by the past presence of a body." These can act as self-sufficient narratives, or alternatively as a stage for Lemsalu's performances, the sculptures sometimes becoming a part of her costumes and props. For her recent works, the artist collaborated with musicians adding a further element to her performances.

== Career ==
Lemsalu's ouvre is eccentric and independent, she creates abstract objects and figures to communicate inner states of mind and elaborate on the human condition in the modern, challenging world. "Her practice reflects the same bricolage of references and materials as her polymorphous, interspecies, transgender punk personnage." She is known in Estonia and internationally.

Lemsalu uses porcelain, fur, wool, textile, plastic, silicone, ready-mades as the material of her work. Lemsalu's work displays attention to color, and effects of the surface, an interest in archetypical and symbolic motives, and also an ironic and reflexive relationship to her medium, with scenographic and absurd humor. Her art includes self-portraits and photo scenes in addition to her abstract sculptures. Her artistic message is focused on the individual and the existential reaction of the individual towards the world.

Aside from installations, musical performances also play an important part in Lemsalu's oevre. For example, “Going Going” at the Performa biennial in New York (2017), “In Heaven Everything is Fine” in KOKO, London (2017), “The Birth of Venus” (2010) and collaboration with art group Gelitin. In public Lemsalu often appears costumized. The documentation of her installations and costumes are published in “Kris Lemsalu” (published by Temnikova & Kasela gallery, 2015) and "Kris Lemsalu. Birth V – Hi and Bye" (published by Estonian Centre for Contemporary Art, 2019).

=== Venice Biennale ===
Kris Lemsalu's exhibition "Birth V – Hi and Bye" was at the Estonian pavilion in Venice biennale 2019. Lemsalu characterized the city of Venice "as a living creature, perpetually decadent and yet endlessly revived." Unlike her earlier works in which Lemsalu focused on engaging death as the main topic, in her Venice Biennale show, she was "more concerned with life – although death wears a carnival mask in Venice anyway." During this time, Lemsalu worked along with group of people including "the curator Maria Arusoo, the poet Andrew Berardini, the mentor Sarah Lucas, the researcher Irene Campolmi, her friend/collaborator Tamara Luuk and performers who brought the inaugural ritual to life during the opening of the Biennale."

=== Awards ===
- 2020 Grand Prize, Cultural Endowment of Estonia
- 2016 'Artist's salary' – Ministry of Culture of Estonia 3-year long grant supporting artists at their creative peak

== Exhibitions ==
=== Solo ===
(2020) "Love Song Sing-Along" (with Kyp Malone) at KW Institute for Contemporary Art, Berlin

(2019) "Birth V – Hi and Bye", representing Estonia in 58th Venice Biennial, Venice "Biker, Bride, Builder, Businesswoman and Baby", Tramway, Glasgow

(2018) "Keys Open Doors" Secession, Vienna, Austria "4LIFE" Goldsmiths CCA, London "Mysteriously Conceived and Deeply Felt", Mavra, Berlin

(2017) "The Wild Ones", Koppe Astner, Glasgow, Scotland "Going going", together with Kyp Malone, Performa 17 Biennial, curated by Esa Nickle and Maaike Gouwenberg, New York, USA CONDO collaborative exhibition, Kris Lemsalu with Koppe Astner, hosted by Southard Reid, London, UK

(2016) "Beauty and the Beast" (together with Tiit Pääsuke), curated by Tamara Luuk, Tallinn Art Hall, Estonia "Afternoon Tear Drinker", curated by Hemma Schmutz, Kunstraum Lakeside, Klagenfurt, Austria

(2015) "Blood Knot Step By Step", Bunshitu Gallery, Tokyo, Japan "Fine With Afterlife", Ferdinand Bauman Gallery, Prague, Czech Republic

(2014) "Lord, Got To Keep On Groovin", Temnikova & Kasela gallery, Tallinn, Estonia

(2012) "Top Sinner", Pro Choice, Vienna, Austria "Evian Desert", Galerie Tanja Wagner, Berlin, Germany "Being Together" (together with Edith Karlson), Temnikova & Kasela gallery, Tallinn, Estonia Kris Lemsalu with Mads Westrup, Hinter Haus des Meeres, Vienna, Austria

(2011) Schneiderei.home.studio.gallery, Vienna, Austria 2008 Gallery Window 108, Copenhagen, Denmark

=== Group ===
==== 2019 ====
"Up to and Including Limits", Muzeum Susch, Zürich

"Body Splits", SALTS, Birsfelden

"Metamorphosis. Art in Europe Now", Fondation Cartier, Paris

==== 2018 ====
"Drawings", 650mah, Hove "Schmaltz", Guimaraes, Vienna

"Artishok Biennial", Baltic Station, Tallinn "100 Sculptures", Anonymous gallery, Mexico City

"Nothing Will Be As Before – Ten Years of Tanya Leighton", Tanya Leighton, Berlin

"Under the Black and Baltic Deep", Northern Clay Center, Minneapolis

"Further Thoughts On Earthy Materials ", GAK Gesellschaft für Aktuelle Kunst, Bremen

"Survival Kit 10", Riga Circus, Riga "Disorder"?, Komplot, Brussels, Belgium

"Give Up the Ghost", Baltic Triennial, Tallinn Art Hall, Tallinn

"There and Back Again", Museum of Contemporary Art Kiasma, Helsinki, Finland

==== 2017 ====
"ESTER KRUMBACHOVÁ. Yeti – Wear the Amulet – Tangle Up the Archive", curated by Zuzana Blochová and Edith Jerábková in collaboration with Anja Kirschner and Pavel Turnovský, tranzitdisplay, Prague, Czech Republic

"Gifts from Estonia", Nanterre-Amandiers, Nanterre, France Performance at DRAF performance night, London, UK

"Where Other Creatures Put Their Eyes", Vermilion Sands, Copenhagen, Denmark

"Homeward Bound", Nicodim, Los Angeles, USA

"Material Traces", curated by Felicitas Thun-Hohenstein, Charim Galerie, Vienna, Austria

"per-'sõ-nae", curated by Anna Lalla, Klemm's, Berlin, Germany

"Be happy! We do not forget you", curated by Andreas Fischer and Veit Loers, Collection Zander / Schloss Bönnigheim, Germany

"Later Is Now", curated by Hugo Canoilas, Workplace, Gateshead, UK

"you see me like a UFO", curated by Marcelle Joseph, Girlpower and Marcelle Joseph Collections, Ascot, UK

"Wormwood", Ellis King, Dublin, Ireland

"Steps to Aeration", curated by Sarah McCrory, Tanya Leighton, Berlin, Germany

"The Hierophant", curated by Aaron Moulton, Galeria Nicodim Bucharest, Romania

"Metamorphosis", curated by Zdenek Felix, KAI 10 / Arthena Foundation, Düsseldorf, Germany; Galerie Guido W. Baudach, Berlin, Germany; and Galerie SVIT, Prague, Czech Republic

"Aftermieter", curated by Veit Loers, Haus Mödrath – Räume für Kunst, Kerpen, Germany

"Physical Mind Restless Hands", Galerie Micky Schubert, Berlin, Germany

"Full Moon in Leo", Galerie Tatjana Pieters, Ghent, Belgium

==== 2016 ====
"Meaning Can only Grow out of Intimacy", curated by Elise Lammer, Les Urbaines, Lausanne, Switzerland Performance

"The Birth of Venus", NU Performance Festival, Tallinn, Estonia

"Mehrlinge", Galerie Kai Erdmann, Hamburg, Germany

"Parallel Vienna", Vienna, Austria

"Winter Is Coming (Homage to the Future)", curated by Maria Arusoo, Georg Kargl gallery, Vienna, Austria Performance together with Gelatin, Manifesta 11, Cabaret Voltaire, Zurich, Switzerland

"Yoga Dog", curated by Veit Loers, gallery Kai Erdmann, Hamburg, Germany

"On Disappearing & For Vanishing", curated by Sten Ojavee, Tartu Art Museum, Tartu, Estonia

"Jumanji", Soft Focus Institute, Ghent, Belgium

"International Fun", curated by Alina Astrova, Temnikova & Kasela Gallery, Tallinn, Estonia

==== 2015 ====
"Revers de Trompe", Xhibit, Vienna, Austria

"The Ultimate Vessel", Koppe Astner, Glasgow, Scotland

"Eating the Forest", Fabbrica del Vapore, Milano, Italy

"Sequences" real time art festival, Reykjavik, Iceland OK Corral Project Space, Copenhagen, Denmark Blackbridge Offspace, Beijing, China Zona Sztuki Aktualnej Gallery, Szczecin, Poland Glasstress, Venice, Italy

==== 2014 ====
Mongolia Land Art Biennial, Mongolian National Art Gallery, Ulaanbataar, Mongolia

"Hans im Glück", Kunstraum Niederösterreich, Vienna, Austria

"The generosity in joyful limitations: 3 dimensions only", BLACKBRIDGE OFFSPACE, Beijing, China

"Ego Editions", Galerie Tanja Wagner, Berlin, Germany

"Merike Estna & Painting in an Open Space", curated by Merike Estna and Kati Ilves, KUMU art museum, Tallinn, Estonia 2013 Urschleim Fauna, Copenhagen, Denmark

==== 2013 ====
"Gelatin – Stop – Anna Ly Sing – Stop", Schinkel Pavillon, Berlin, Germany

"ART IST KUKU NU UT PRADA PRAVDA", Tartu Art Museum, Noorus Gallery and Y gallery, Tartu, Estonia

"is my territory.", curated by Monica Bonvicini, Christine König Galerie, Vienna, Austria

"Loch" together with Gelatin, 21er Haus, Vienna, Austria

"The Mediterranean Dog", COLE Gallery, London, Great Britain

"90 years of ceramic education in Estonia", Estonian Museum Of Applied Arts, Tallinn, Estonia

"ephemeral self – finite projections", Galerie NTK, Prague, Czech Republic

==== 2012 ====
"The Scientific People", Kunstraum Niederösterreich, Vienna, Austria

"Discussing Metamodernism", Galerie Tanja Wagner, Berlin, Germany

"Black Pages #31", Galerie Emanuel Layr, Vienna, Austria

"Nasensuche with Gelatin", Schloss Rossatz, Wachau, Austria

"In Passing 14 with Lilo Nein", Künstlerhaus, Vienna, Austria Performance together with Gelatin, Tanzquartier Wien, Vienna, Austria

"Elaine MGK", Museum für Gegenwartskunst, Basel IHM Fair, Switzerland

==== 2011 ====
"Modeling Agency", 68squaremetres, Copenhagen, Denmark

"There was a job to be done and everybody thought somebody would do it", Kunstraum Niederösterreich, Vienna, Austria 2010 Kunstperformancenacht IV, Ballhaus Ost, Berlin, Germany

"Reality Check with Gelatin", Prague, Czech Republic

"Filmiki", curated by Pawel Althamer, Dana Charkasi gallery, Vienna, Austria Status Quo Vadis, performance, Melk, Austria Vienna Art Week, Sammlung Lenikus, Vienna, Austria Creative House, performance, Steiermark, Austria 2008

"Space of Doubt", Undervand, Copenhagen, Denmark
