= Corina Apostol =

Romanian art curator

Dr. Corina L. Apostol is an art curator, educator and writer from Constanța, Romania, currently based in Amsterdam, The Netherlands. Since 2023 she serves as Assistant Professor of Social Practice in Contemporary Art and Culture at the University of Amsterdam. Between 2019 and 2023 she was a curator at the Tallinn Art Hall. In 2022 she was appointed the curator of the Estonian pavilion at the 59th Venice Biennale held in the Dutch pavilion. Her work has been recognised with nominations for the 2015 Fondation Prince Pierre de Monaco Prize, the 2016 Kandinsky Prize, the 2020 Sergey Kuryokhin Award and the 2022 Igor Zabel Award.

== Education ==
Corina Apostol received a Bachelor of Art major in Art History, History and minor in Visual Studies at the Duke University. She obtained a Master's degree and a Ph.D. in Art History at Rutgers University. Apostol is a polyglot, and speaks Romanian, English, French, Dutch, German, Spanish and Russian, to various degrees.

== Career ==
Apostol served as a curator at the Tallinn Art Hall (2019-2023) and guest lecturer at the Art Academy of Latvia (2021-2023). Since 2010, she is the cofounder of the activist publishing collective ArtLeaks and editor-in-chief of the ArtLeaks Gazette. Between 2010 and 2017 she was the Norton Dodge Curatorial Fellow at the Zimmerli Art Museum at Rutgers University, researching and exhibiting The Norton and Nancy Dodge Collection of Soviet Nonconformist Art. In 2013 she opened the exhibition "Leningra'd Perestroika: Crosscurents in Photography, Video and Music" highlighting the unique photographic, video, and musical innovations that shaped the Leningrad (now known as St. Petersburg) unofficial art culture during the period of glasnost and perestroika.

In 2010, she co-founded ArtLeaks, together with an international group of artists, writers, curators and activists, a platform that draws attention to cases involving politically active cultural workers and associated campaigns. Artleaks seeks to create a strong network of art whistleblowers to support and protect arts workers. Based on her experiences with ArtLeaks, she contributed to the book Truth Is Concrete Handbook, and for an activism that Truth is Concrete: A Handbook for Artistic Strategies in Real Politics and to the exhibition "Publishing Against the Grain," (2017-2023)] organized by ICI.

In 2016, she was selected as part of the Board of Directors of the Romanian National Cultural Fund. She wrote the chapter "The Art of Making Community" in Area Studies in the Global Age: Community, Place, Identity (Cornell University Press, 2016), about Romanian artist Lia Perjovschi. Between 2017 and 2019 she was the Andrew W. Mellon Fellow at Creative Time. In 2019, Apostol co-edited together with Nato Thompson the book Making Another World Possible: 10 Creative Time Summits, 10 Global Issues, 100 Art Projects, published by Routledge. In 2018, she co-curated together with Elvira Dyangani-Ose the Creative Time Summit: "On Archipelagoes and Other Imaginaries" at the Arsht Center for Performing Arts and other locations across Miami, FL.

In 2020, she was selected as the curator for the Estonian Pavilion at the 59th Venice Biennale. The project, entitled "Orchidelirium: An Appetite for Abundance" was presented in the Dutch Rietveld Pavilion in the Giardini della Biennale, and showcased artworks by several contemporary artists including Kristina Norman, Eko Supriyanto, the botanical artist Emilie Rosalie Saal (1871-1954).

In 2022, Apostol curated the project "Polar Rainbow", a socially engaged project using Augmented Reality, first presented by Time Square Arts during Pride Month. Under her curatorship, the project was also presented by Fundacja Bęc Zmiana and Asociația Accept in the same year.

Between 2019 and 2023 she was a curator and member of the steering committee of Beyond Matter an international, collaborative, practice-based research project that takes cultural heritage and culture in development to the verge of virtual reality, spearheaded by the ZKM Center for Art and Media Karlsruhe. In this framework, she co-edited together with Lívia Nolasco-Rózsás the book Immerse! (2023), published by Hatje Canz.

In fall 2023 Apostol was appointed assistant professor of social practice in contemporary art and culture at the University of Amsterdam. Since 2024, she is the coordinator of the Research School for Art History (OSK) visiting fellowship in Modern and Contemporary Art, a program in collaboration with the Stedelijk Museum and the Netherlands Institute for Art History (RKD). Apostol's next book project is Flora Fantastic: From Orchidelirium to Eco-critical Contemporary Art.

She is the associate producer of Zach Blas' CULTUS which addresses a burgeoning AI religiosity in the tech industry and considers the ways in which artificial intelligence is imbued with god-like powers and marshalled to serve beliefs of judgement and transcendence, extraction and immortality, pleasure and punishment, individual freedom and cult devotion. The project was first presented at arebyte gallery in London (October 2023 - February 2024) and at the Vienna Secession (March - June 2024).

== Recognition ==
In 2016, Apostol was longlisted for the Kandinsky Prize in the category “Scholarly work. Contemporary art history and theory.”, and in 2020 she was on the longlist of the Sergey Kuryokhin Award for "Best Curatorial Project". In 2022 she was nominated for the Igor Zabel Award. In 2023, she won the apexart curatorial open call in NYC together with Dr. Tashima Thomas, with the exhibition "Flora Fantastic: Eco-critical Contemporary Botanical Art."
