= Kaido Ole =

Estonian painter

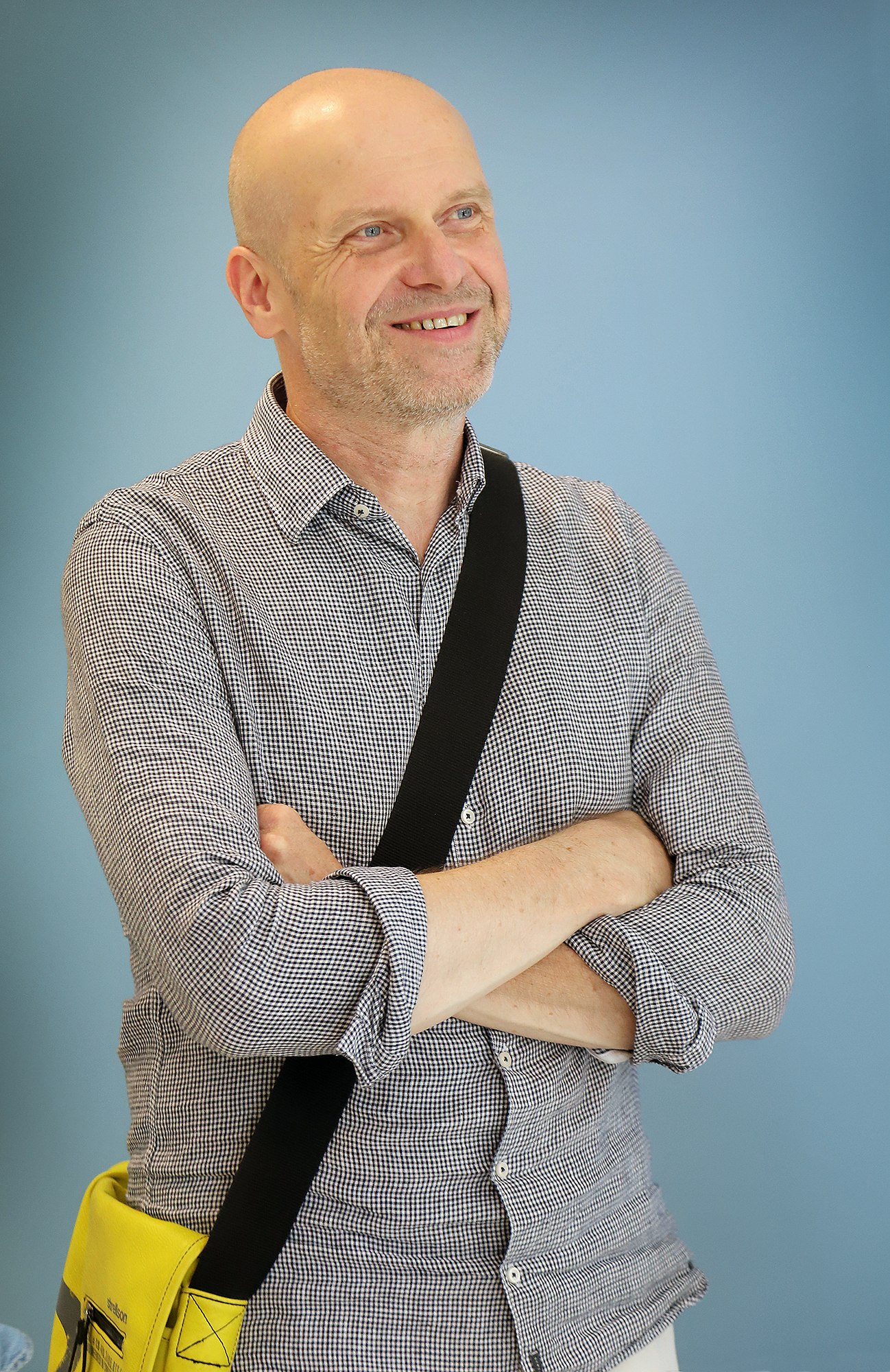
Kaido Ole

Kaido Ole (born 23 February 1963) is an Estonian painter.

Ole was born in Tallinn. His great-uncle was artist Eduard Ole. In 1992, he graduated from Estonian Academy of Arts. He worked as a painting instructor at the Tallinn Art School from 1992 until 1993. From 2003 until 2010, he taught painting at Estonian Academy of Arts. Since 2010 he is a freelance painter.

Since 1989 he has exhibited his works. In 2003 he represented Estonia at 50th Venice Biennale (with Marko Mäetamm) in the Estonian pavilion.

Most of his works can be classified as conceptual art.

== Awards ==
- Kristjan Raud Award (1998)
- Sadolin Art Award (1998)
- Annual Award of the Estonian Cultural Endowment for Fine Arts and Applied Arts (1999)
- Annual Award of the Estonian Cultural Endowment for Fine Arts and Applied Arts (2005)
- Konrad Mägi Medal (2012)
- Order of the White Star, Class III (2014)
