= Richard Learoyd =

British artist and photographer

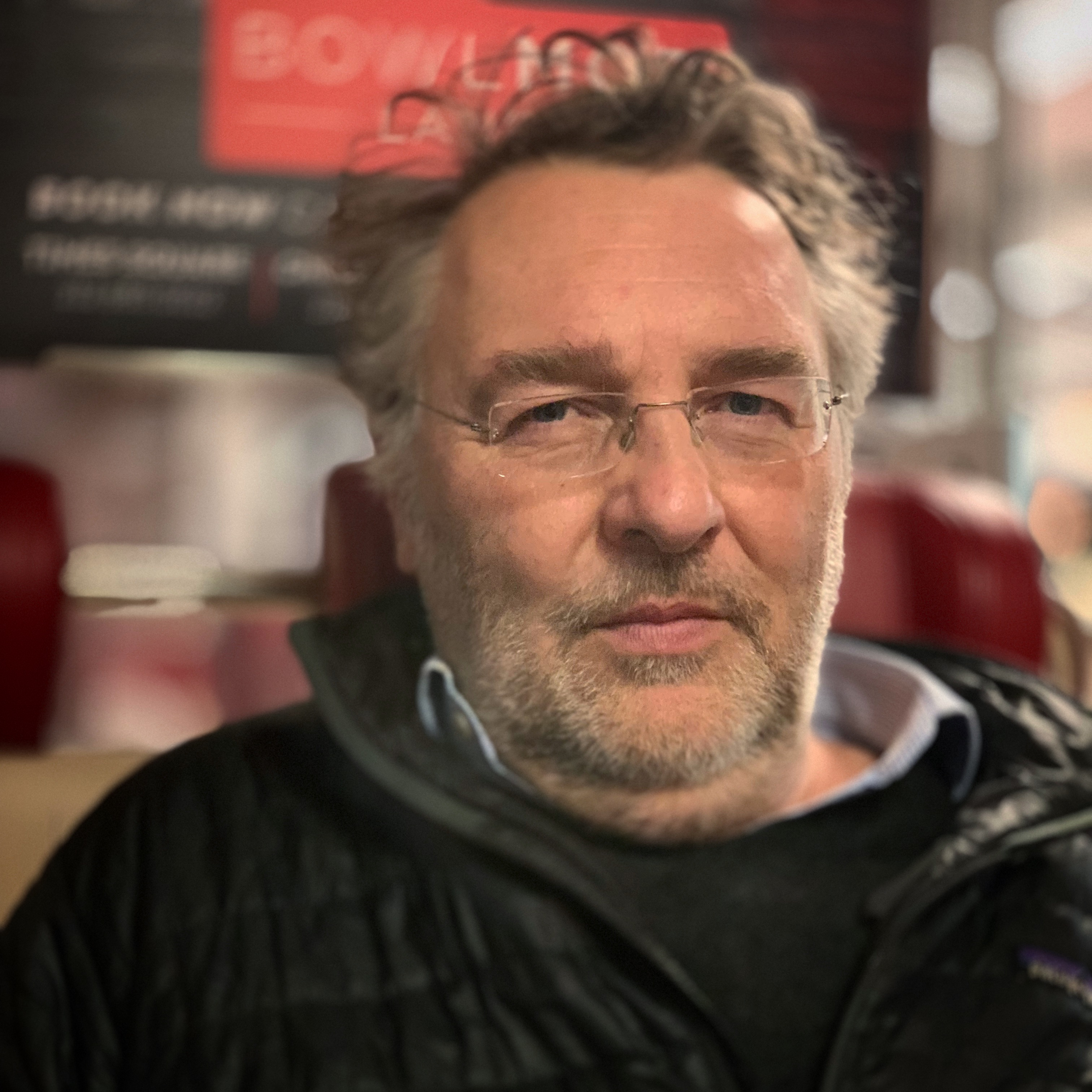
- Richard Learoyd, New York, 2019
- Born: 1966 (age 59–60); Nelson, Lancashire, England
- Known for: Fine Art Photography
- Spouse: 1 Wife
- Children: 3 Children
- Website: www.richardlearoyd.studio

Richard Learoyd (born 1966) is a British contemporary visual artist and photographer.

== Early life and work ==
Richard Learoyd was born in the small mill town of Nelson, Lancashire, England in 1966. At the age of 15, his mother insisted he take a pinhole photography workshop, which he attributes as the start of his interest in photography. In 1990 he graduated from the Glasgow School of Art with a degree in Fine Art Photography. While there he studied with American photographer Thomas Joshua Cooper. In 1991 Learoyd was awarded an artist-in-residence at the Scottish Ballet. Learoyd taught photography at Bournemouth and Poole College from 1994 until 1999. In 2000, he moved to London where he worked as a commercial photographer.

== Publications ==
=== Publications by Learoyd ===
- Richard Learoyd Twenty-Two Photographs: 2005-07. London: Self-published, 2008. Essay by Martin Barnes and Chris Bucklow.
- Richard Learoyd Unique Photograph: 2007-09. New York: McKee Gallery, 2009. Interview by Chris Bucklow.
- Presences. San Francisco: Fraenkel Gallery, 2011. ASIN B0086RVF6C
- Portraits and Figures. New York: McKee Gallery, 2011. Essay by Mark Alice Durant.
- Richard Learoyd: Still/Life. New York: Mckee Gallery, 2013. ASIN B00I7UWV0M. Essay by Charles Moffet.
- Day for Night. New York: Aperture; San Francisco, Pier 24 Photography, 2015. ISBN 978-1-59711-329-8. Essays by Richard Learoyd, Martin Barnes and Nancy Gryspeerdt
- Richard Learoyd: The Silence of the Camera Obscura. Madrid: Fundación MAPFRE, 2019. Essays by Phillip Gefter and Sandra Phillips.

=== Publications with contributions by Learoyd ===
- Dress Codes: The Third ICP Triennial of Photography and Video. Göttingen: Steidl, 2010. ISBN 978-3865219503
- About Face. San Francisco: Pier 24 Photography, 2012. ISBN 978-0-9839917-1-7. Exhibition guide.
- Seduced by Art: Photography Past and Present, London: National Gallery, 2012. ISBN 978-1857095456
- The Unphotographable. San Francisco: Fraenkel Gallery, 2013. ISBN 978-1881337331
- About Face. San Francisco: Pier 24 Photography, 2014. ISBN 978-0-9839917-2-4. Exhibition catalog. Edition of 1000 copies. With forewords by Christopher McCall, and Richard Avedon (from In The American West), an introduction by Philip Gefter, and texts by Sandra S. Phillips, and Ulrike Schneider.

== Exhibitions ==
=== Solo ===
- 1992: Elevations, Stills Gallery, Scotland
- 1993: Artificial Horizons, Street Level Gallery, Glasgow, Scotland
- 2007: Richard Learoyd, Union Gallery, London
- 2009: Unique Photographs, McKee Gallery, New York
- 2011: Presence, Fraenkel Gallery, San Francisco, CA
- 2011: Portraits and Figures, McKee Gallery, New York
- 2013: Still/Life, McKee Gallery, New York
- 2013: The Outside World, Fraenkel Gallery, San Francisco, CA
- 2015-2016: Richard Learoyd: Dark Mirror, Victoria and Albert Museum, London, 2015/16
- 2016: Day for Night, Pace MacGill, New York
- 2016: In the Studio, J. Paul Getty Museum, Los Angeles, CA; The Nelson-Atkins Museum of Art, Kansas City, MO
- 2017: Richard Learoyd, Fraenkel Gallery, San Francisco, CA
- 2019: Richard Learoyd: Curious, Pace/MacGill Gallery, New York
- 2019: Richard Learoyd: The Silence of the Camera Obscura, Fundación Mapfre, Madrid
- 2022: Richard Learoyd, Fraenkel Gallery, San Francisco, CA

=== Group ===
- 2010: Dress Codes The Third ICP Triennial of Photography and Video, International Centre of Photography, New York, curated by Vince Aletti, Kristen Lubben, Christopher Phillips, and Carol Squiers
- 2010: Pier 24: The Inaugural Exhibition, Pier 24 Photography, San Francisco, CA (2010)/
- 2010: Object Lesson, New York Photo Festival, NY. Curated by Vince Aletti
- 2011: The More Things Change, San Francisco Museum of Modern Art, CA
- 2012: Seduced by Art: Photography Past and Present, National Gallery, London
- 2012-2013: About Face, Pier 24 Photography, San Francisco, CA (2012/13)
- 2013: The Unphotographable, Fraenkel Gallery, CA
- 2014 Negativeless, Michael Hoppen Gallery, London
- 2016-2017: Collected, Pier 24 Photography, San Francisco, CA (2016/17)

== Collections ==
Learoyd's work is held in the following public collections:

- Centre Georges Pompidou, Paris.
- J. Paul Getty Museum, Los Angeles, CA
- The Metropolitan Museum of Art, New York
- Museum of Modern Art, New York
- National Gallery of Canada, Ottawa, Canada
- Nelson Atkins Museum of Art, Kansas City, MO
- Pier 24 Photography, San Francisco, CA
- San Francisco Museum of Modern Art, San Francisco, CA
- Scottish Arts Council, Edinburgh, United Kingdom
- Tate Gallery, London
- Victoria and Albert Museum, London
- Yale University Art Gallery, New Haven, CT
