= Elisheva Biernoff =

American artist (born 1980)

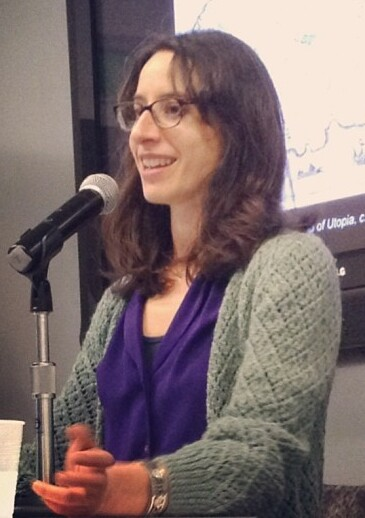
- Biernoff in 2014
- Born: 1980 (age 44–45); Albuquerque, New Mexico, U.S.
- Education: Yale University; California College of the Arts (MFA)
- Occupation: Artist

Elisheva Biernoff (born 1980) is an American artist known for her detailed painted recreations of found vintage snapshot photographs.

== Early life and education ==
Biernoff was born in Albuquerque in 1980. In 2002 she graduated from Yale. In 2007 she moved to San Francisco, and in 2009 received her Master of Fine Arts degree from the California College of the Arts.

== Career ==
Biernoff is known for her detailed painted recreations of found vintage snapshot photographs, including photographic artefacts such as lens flare or overexposure, or physical details such as water damage to the photo paper. She started creating these paintings when she was asked to create an installation for a storefront window in the Bayview-Hunters Point neighbourhood of San Francisco in 2009. As she didn't know anyone in that area of the city, she asked local residents for any pictures of family members they could share, as a way to familiarize herself with the neighbourhood. Her first painted photograph reproductions were made from these images, and exhibited in the storefront as what she called a "community living-room wall".

Alongside painting, Biernoff works in photography, sculpture, video, and installation art. Glen Helfand, writing for Artforum, described Biernoff's 2010 show at Triple Base Gallery in San Francisco as a trompe l'oeil installation in which litter such as gum wrappers and cigarette butts is "attentively remade with authentic artificiality". Helfand noted that issues such as sustainability and inefficiency are hinted at by elements such as geographically incongruous plants and used tissues crafted in solid form.

So photorealistic are some of Biernoff's works that in 2015, artist Cynthia Daignault accidentally appropriated an image of a painting by Biernoff, of a vintage postcard, for her own project, The Mysterious Arrival of an Unusual Letter. Daignault found an image of the painting via Google image search and, thinking it to be a photo of an actual vintage postcard, used it to promote her project, which involved painting landscapes from life on postcards. Diagnault immediately apologised, acknowledging the mistake via her newsletter the same day.

From 2015 to 2016 Biernoff was artist in residence at the MacDowell Colony in New Hampshire.

Biernoff is represented by Fraenkel Gallery, and has exhibited shows there in 2017, 2021, and 2024. Her first solo museum show was at the Nevada Museum of Art from 2023 to 2024.

Biernoff's work is in the collections of galleries including the Buffalo AKG Art Museum, the Metropolitan Museum of Art, the National Gallery of Art, the Philadelphia Museum of Art, the San Francisco Museum of Modern Art, and Yale University Art Gallery.
