= Ralph Eugene Meatyard =

American photographer

- Born: May 15, 1925; Normal, Illinois, U.S.
- Died: May 7, 1972 (aged 46); Lexington, Kentucky, U.S.
- Known for: Photography

Ralph Eugene Meatyard (May 15, 1925 – May 7, 1972) was an American photographer from Normal, Illinois, U.S.

== Life and career ==
Meatyard was born in Normal, Illinois in May 1925 and raised in the nearby town of Bloomington. When he turned 18 during World War II, he joined the United States Navy, though he did not serve overseas before the war ended. After leaving the force he attended Williams College under the GI Bill, and briefly studied pre-dentistry, before training to become an optician.

He moved with his new wife Madelyn to Lexington, Kentucky to continue working as an optician for Tinder-Krausse-Tinder, a company which also sold photographic equipment. The owners of the company were active members of the Lexington Camera Club, for which the Art Department of the University of Kentucky provided exhibition space.

Meatyard purchased his first camera in 1950 to photograph his newborn first child, and subsequently worked primarily with a Rolleiflex 6cm square medium-format camera. He joined the Lexington Camera Club and the Photographic Society of America in 1954. At the Lexington Camera Club he met Van Deren Coke, who exhibited work by Meatyard in an exhibition for the university entitled "Creative Photography" in 1956.

During the mid-1950s, Meatyard attended a series of summer workshops run by Henry Holmes Smith at Indiana University, and also with Minor White, who fostered Meatyard's interest in Zen philosophy.

An autodidact and voracious reader, Meatyard worked in productive bursts, often leaving his film undeveloped for long stretches, then working feverishly in the makeshift darkroom in his home. "His approach was somewhat improvisational and very heavily influenced by the jazz music of the time." He used his children in his work addressing the surreal "masks" of identity.

Much of his work was made in abandoned farmhouses in the central Kentucky bluegrass region during family weekend outings and in derelict spaces around Lexington. Some of his earliest camera work was made in the traditionally African-American neighborhood around Lexington's Old Georgetown Street.

Meatyard was a close acquaintance of several well-known writers in the Kentucky literary renaissance of the 1960s and 1970s, including his neighbor Guy Davenport, who later helped compile a posthumous edition of his photos. In 1971, Meatyard co-authored a book on Kentucky's Red River Gorge, The Unforeseen Wilderness, with writer Wendell Berry. The two frequently traveled into the Appalachian foothills. Berry and Meatyard's book contributed to saving the gorge from destruction by a proposed Army Corps of Engineers dam. Meatyard's ashes were scattered in the gorge after his death.

Meatyard was also a friend and correspondent of Catholic monk and writer Thomas Merton, who lived at the Abbey of Gethsemani, a Trappist monastery just west of Bardstown, Kentucky. Merton appeared in a number of Meatyard's experimental photographs taken on the grounds of the monastery, and they shared an interest in literature, philosophy, and Eastern and Western spirituality. Meatyard wrote Merton's eulogy in the Kentucky Kernel shortly after his death in Bangkok, Thailand, in December 1968. Meatyard died four years later, in 1972, of cancer.

== Photography ==
Though Lexington was not a well-established center of photography, Meatyard did not consider himself a "Southern" or regional photographer. His work was beginning to be recognized nationally at the time of his death, shown and collected by some prominent museums and published in magazines. He exhibited with photographers including Edward Weston, Ansel Adams, Minor White, Aaron Siskind, Harry Callahan, Robert Frank, and Eikoh Hosoe. By the late 1970s, his photographs appeared mainly in exhibitions of 'southern' art, but have since attracted renewed interest. His best-known photography featured dolls and masks, or family, friends and neighbors pictured in abandoned buildings or in ordinary suburban backyards.

From December 12, 2025 – May 10, 2026, the High Museum of Art exhibited The Family Album of Ralph Eugene Meatyard that “features the thirty-six prints that comprise the artist’s first monograph (Gnomon Press, 1970)—one of only two books he published in his lifetime—which Meatyard intended to stand as his definitive artistic statement.” The prints were recently acquired by the High Museum for its permanent collection.

== Personal life ==
Meatyard married Madelyn McKinney. They had three children: Michael (born 1950); Melissa (born 1959); and Christopher (born 1955). Meatyard died of cancer in 1972. He was described as a "bookish Zenmaster [who] also served as president of the local PTA and the Little League and flipped burgers at the Fourth of July party.

== Publications ==
- Halls, James Baker, ed. Ralph Eugene Meatyard: Emblems & Rites (Millerton, New York: Aperture, 1974) There had already been an earlier book, Ralph Eugene Meatyard, issued in 1970 by the Gnomon Press with an introduction by Wendell Berry and notes by Arnold Gassan.
- Meatyard, Ralph Eugene; & Davenport, Guy (Essay), 2005, Ralph Eugene Meatyard, (Steidl/ICP)
- Ralph Eugene Meatyard Phaidon Press 2002 ISBN 0-7148-4112-9
- Rhem, James; Ralph Eugene Meatyard: The Family Album of Lucybelle Crater and Other Figurative Photographs (Distributed Art Publishers, 2002) 125 pages. Three critical texts, "Lucybelle" with 34 additional previously unpublished Meatyard photographs. ISBN 1-891024-29-9
- Rhem, James (Author); & Meatyard, Ralph Eugene (Photographer), 1999, Ralph Eugene Meatyard, Photopoche, No: 87’, (Centre National de Photo)
- Tannenbaum, Barbara (Editor); 1991, Ralph Eugene Meatyard: An American Visionary, Rizzoli.
