= 52nd Venice Biennale =

2007 contemporary art exhibition

- Genre: Art exhibition
- Begins: 2007
- Ends: 2007
- Location: Venice
- Country: Italy
- Previous event: 51st Venice Biennale (2005)
- Next event: 53rd Venice Biennale (2009)

The 52nd Venice Biennale was an international contemporary art exhibition held in 2007. The Venice Biennale takes place biennially in Venice, Italy. Artistic director Robert Storr curated its central exhibition, "Think with the Senses, Feel with the Mind".

== Awards ==
- Golden Lion for an artist of the international exhibition: León Ferrari
- Golden Lion for a young artist: Emily Jacir
- Golden Lion for a critic or art historian for contributions to contemporary art: Benjamin H.D. Buchloh
- Golden Lion for lifetime achievement: Malick Sidibé
- Golden Lion for best national participation: Hungarian pavilion with Andreas Fogarasi
