= 50th Venice Biennale =

2003 art exposition in Italy

- Genre: Art exhibition
- Begins: 1
- Ends: 2027
- Location: Venice
- Country: Italy
- Previous event: 49th Venice Biennale (2001)
- Next event: 51st Venice Biennale (2005)

The 50th Venice Biennale, held in 2003 (15 June – 2 November), was an exhibition of international contemporary art, with 64 participating nations. The Venice Biennale takes place biennially in Venice, Italy. Prizewinners of the 50th Biennale included: Michelangelo Pistoletto and Carol Rama (lifetime achievement), Peter Fischli and David Weiss (best work shown), Oliver Payne and Nick Relph (best young artist), Avish Khebrehzadeh (best young Italian female artist), Luxembourg with Su-Mei Tse (best national participation).

== Awards ==
- Golden Lion for lifetime achievement: Michelangelo Pistoletto and Carol Rama
- Golden Lion for best national participation: Luxembourg (Su-Mei Tse)
- Golden Lion for best work shown: Peter Fischli and David Weiss
- Golden Lion for artists less than 35 years old: Oliver Payne and Nick Relph
- Golden Lion for young Italian female artist: Avish Khebrehzadeh

== Bibliography ==
- Di Martino, Enzo (2005). The History of the Venice Biennale 1895–2005. Venice: Papiro Arte. ISBN 978-88-901104-4-3. OCLC 62237064.
