= 48th Venice Biennale =

Art exhibition in 1999

- Genre: Art exhibition
- Begins: 1999
- Ends: 1999
- Location: Venice
- Country: Italy
- Previous event: 47th Venice Biennale (1997)
- Next event: 49th Venice Biennale (2001)

The 48th Venice Biennale, held in 1999, was an exhibition of international contemporary art, with 60 participating nations. The Venice Biennale takes place biennially in Venice, Italy. Prize winners of the 48th Biennale included: Louise Bourgeois and Bruce Nauman (lifetime achievement), Italy (best national participation), and Doug Aitken, Cai Guo-Qiang, and Shirin Neshat (International Prize).

== Awards ==
- Golden Lion for lifetime achievement: Louise Bourgeois and Bruce Nauman
- Golden Lion for best national participation: Italy
- International Prize: Doug Aitken, Cai Guo-Qiang, Shirin Neshat
- Special Awards: Georges Adéagbo, Eija-Liisa Ahtila, Katarzyna Kozyra, Lee Bul
- Premia Unesco for the promotion of the Arts: Ghada Amer

== Bibliography ==
- Di Martino, Enzo (2005). The History of the Venice Biennale 1895–2005. Venice: Papiro Arte. ISBN 978-88-901104-4-3. OCLC 62237064.
