= 47th Venice Biennale =

- Genre: Art exhibition
- Begins: 1997
- Ends: 1997
- Location: Venice
- Country: Italy
- Previous event: 47th Venice Biennale (1997)
- Next event: 48th Venice Biennale (1999)

The 47th Venice Biennale, held in 1997, was an exhibition of international contemporary art, with 59 participating nations. The Venice Biennale takes place biennially in Venice, Italy. Prizewinners of the 47th Biennale included: Agnes Martin and Emilio Vedova (lifetime achievement), the French pavilion (best national participation), Marina Abramović and Gerhard Richter (International Prize), and Douglas Gordon, Pipilotti Rist, and Rachel Whiteread (best young artists).

== Awards ==
- Golden Lion for lifetime achievement: Agnes Martin and Emilio Vedova
- Golden Lion for best national participation: France (Fabrice Hyber)
- International Prize: Marina Abramović and Gerhard Richter
- Premio 2000 (young artists): Douglas Gordon, Pipilotti Rist, Rachel Whiteread
- Special awards: Thierry De Cordier, Marie-Ange Guilleminot, Ik-Joong Kang, Mariko Mori
- Premia (purchase) Cassa di Risparmio Foundation: Tobias Rehberger
- Premia giapponese Benesse: Alexandros Psychoulis
- Premia Illycaffè: Sam Taylor-Wood

== Bibliography ==
- Di Martino, Enzo (2005). The History of the Venice Biennale 1895–2005. Venice: Papiro Arte. ISBN 978-88-901104-4-3. OCLC 62237064.
