= 49th Venice Biennale =

- Genre: Art exhibition
- Begins: 2001
- Ends: 2001
- Location: Venice
- Country: Italy
- Previous event: 48th Venice Biennale (1999)
- Next event: 50th Venice Biennale (2003)

The 49th Venice Biennale, held in 2001, was an exhibition of international contemporary art, with 65 participating nations. The Venice Biennale takes place biennially in Venice, Italy. Prizewinners of the 49th Biennale included: Richard Serra and Cy Twombly (lifetime achievement), Janet Cardiff and George Bures Miller, Marisa Merz, Pierre Huyghe (International Prize), and Germany (best national participation).

== Awards ==
- Golden Lion for lifetime achievement: Richard Serra and Cy Twombly
- Golden Lion for best national participation: Germany
- International Prize: Janet Cardiff and George Bures Miller, Marisa Merz, Pierre Huyghe
- Special award: Yinka Shonibare, Tiong Ang, Samuel Beckett/Marin Karmitz, Juan Downey
- Special awards for young artists: Federico Herrero, Anri Sala, John Pilson, Al-53167
- Premia Fondazione Panathlon Domenico Chiesa: Urs Lüthi

== Bibliography ==
- Di Martino, Enzo (2005). The History of the Venice Biennale 1895–2005. Venice: Papiro Arte. ISBN 978-88-901104-4-3. OCLC 62237064.
