= 51st Venice Biennale =

Exhibition of contemporary art

- Genre: Art exhibition
- Begins: 2005
- Ends: 2005
- Location: Venice
- Country: Italy
- Previous event: 50th Venice Biennale (2003)
- Next event: 52nd Venice Biennale (2007)

The 51st Venice Biennale, held in 2005, was an exhibition of international contemporary art. The Venice Biennale takes place biennially in Venice, Italy. Prizewinners included Barbara Kruger (lifetime achievement), the French pavilion with Annette Messager (best national representation), Thomas Schütte (best in International Exhibition), and Regina José Galindo (best young artist).

== Bibliography ==
- Di Martino, Enzo (2005). The History of the Venice Biennale 1895–2005. Venice: Papiro Arte. ISBN 978-88-901104-4-3. OCLC 62237064.
- Vetrocq, Marcia E. (September 2005). "Venice Biennale: Be Careful What You Wish For". Art in America. 93 (8): 108–168. ISSN 0004-3214.
