= St. Peter's Presbyterian Church =

Historic church in New York, United States

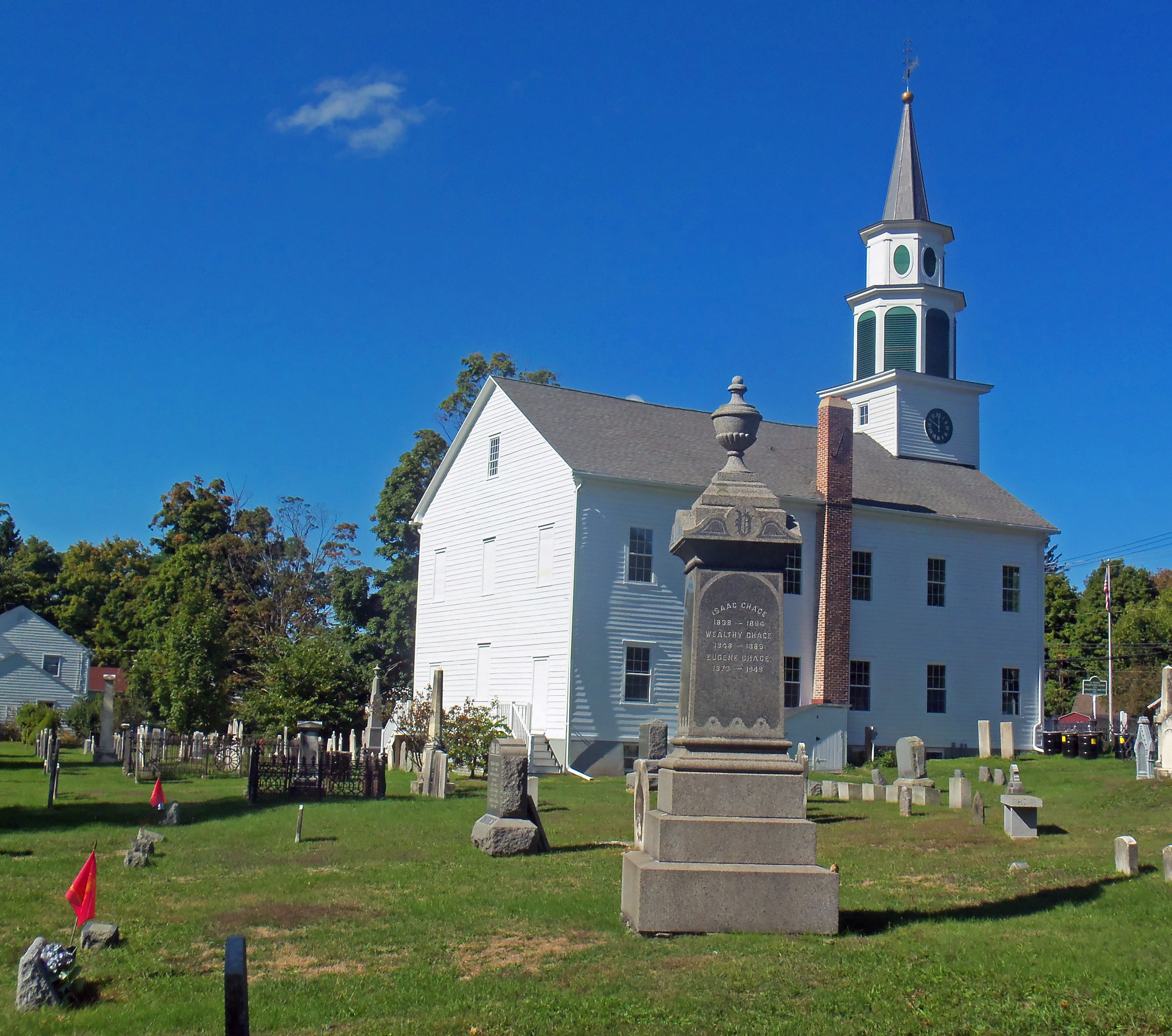
- Cemetery and church, rear and east elevation, 2012

Religion
- Affiliation: Presbyterian
- Leadership: The Rev. Lynn Horan

Location
- Location: Spencertown, NY, USA
- Interactive map of St. Peter's Presbyterian Church
- Coordinates: 42°19′23″N 73°32′46″W

Architecture
- Style: Federal
- General contractor: Capt. William Avery Babcock
- Completed: 1826

Specifications
- Direction of façade: east
- Length: 60 feet (18 m)
- Width: 40 feet (12 m)
- Height (max): 70 feet (21 m)
- Materials: wood, brick

U.S. National Register of Historic Places
- Added to NRHP: August 2, 2002
- NRHP Reference no.: 02000821

Website
- http://saintpeterspc.org/

St. Peter's Presbyterian Church is located at the junction of New York State Route 203 and South Street (Columbia County Route 7) in Spencertown, New York, United States. It is a tall frame building in a style similar to those found in New England, the native region of many of the area's original 18th century settlers. Just to its east is Spencertown Cemetery, with graves dating to 1760, shortly after the area was settled and the congregation formed.

The church was built in 1771, across the road from where it now stands. It was moved to its present location and expanded slightly in 1826. Over the rest of the 19th and 20th centuries it was renovated and modified slightly. In 2002 it and the cemetery were added to the National Register of Historic Places.

== Property ==
The church and cemetery are on a 1.1-acre (4,500 m^{2}) parcel on the south side of Route 203 at the fork with South Street. It is across from Austerlitz Town Hall and other buildings of the small rural hamlet. The former comes right up to the edge of the roadway, with little setback. To the south the ground slopes downward slightly to the edge of the Punsit Creek gorge, offering views of hills in that direction. The cemetery is set off by a cast iron fence. Both it and the church are contributing resources to the Register listing.

=== Church ===
The five-by-six-bay building is two stories high, sided in clapboard. Its gabled roof is topped with a centrally located engaged steeple. A brick chimney rises on the exterior eastern wall.

On the north (front) facade, the middle three bays project slightly, topped by a pediment above the eaves. The centrally located main entrance has a molded surround and Greek Revival cornice. There are windows next to it but not at the corners. A Palladian window, with two regular sash windows on either side, is above it. There is also a wheelchair ramp.

The belfry has three stages. The lowest is 10 feet (3 m) square, with clapboard siding similar to that on the church. On three sides it has clock faces with Roman numerals. The next stage is octagonal with green louvers and white segmental arches and corner posts. Above it is a smaller octagon, with green louvered ovals. On the hexagonal steeple is a metal ball and weathervane.

On the rear, one window on the first story and three on the second have been boarded over. Modern fire doors flank the first window on the first story. There is also a small attic window in the gable field. Both sides are fully fenestrated.

Behind the double entry doors is the full-width vestibule. On either side are paired double-run stairs with their original rails and balusters. An elevator, for disabled access, is on the southeast corner as well. All lead up to a partitioned room where the bell rope hangs through a hole in the ceiling. Off it is the balcony, with a paneled railing. A smaller, narrower stair leads to an attic where king post trusses support the church's ceiling rafters. At the top stage of the belfry is a Meneely bell, with "1858" stamped into it, supported in an iron cage.

Doors in the corners open into side aisles that lead all the way to the elevated pulpit, past white pews with walnut railings. More walnut railings and white balusters extend across the front of the platform. A long recessed arch is behind it. The windows have simple vernacular Federal style molding. Wall sconces are behind each of them in the gray plaster wall.

=== Cemetery ===
Gravestones in the cemetery date to the time the church was built to the present, as the cemetery has not been filled yet. The earliest, that of Hannah Lawrence, is dated 1760. The funerary art on those stones ranges from the death's head common on most New England tombstones of the period to arabesques and engraved Roman letters. Later stones, from the end of the 19th century, have human or angelic figures.

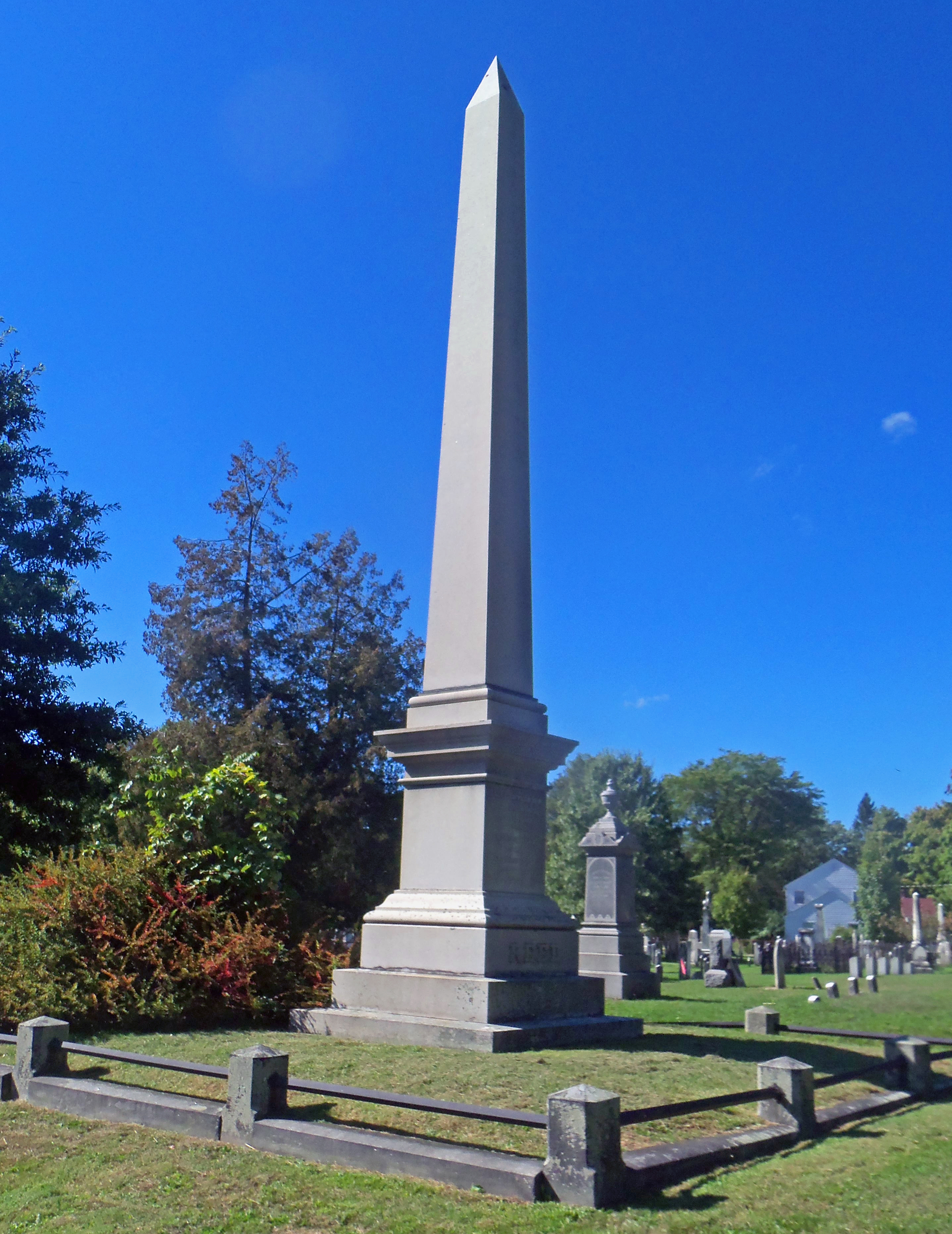
Obelisk in rear of cemetery

Some decedents have more elaborate memorials. Two tall obelisks are in use, one from 1772 and another for the Beale family in the 1870s and 1880s. Near the rear of the cemetery is a low stone crypt.

== History ==
The church's history has three eras: from its founding and construction to its move to its present site, from that time to the interior renovations of the mid-20th century, and from then to the present

=== 1760–1826: Founding and construction ===
The area was first settled by emigrants from New England around 1750, and soon acquired the name "Spencer's Town", after one of them. The settlers formed a company and divided the land it owned into hundred-acre (40 ha) lots called "rights", with each owner having a vote in company decisions. In 1760 the settlers voted to grant one and a half rights to the first minister to settle in the area. The following year one, Jesse Clark, did. The minutes of the meeting where his salary was set also make the first reference to the cemetery, suggesting it had been in existence for at least a year at that point.

Another meeting was called to select a site for a meeting house, but it was never held. Services were held in private homes until the church was built by a local carpenter, William Babcock, in 1771 on the town green, facing northwest. At that time the church was one bay shorter and did not have a steeple.

Further development of the church and congregation soon stalled as the Revolution began and some area families left for Canada as Loyalists. Settlement of Spencertown began anew after the war and by 1789, when its first trustees were chosen, the church had again become the focal point of the community. Membership continued to grow under a new pastor, David Porter, and in 1803 the church was formally incorporated. At that time it was primarily a Congregationalist church, like the ones in the New England communities the settlers had come from. Anglicans and Presbyterians also worshipped there, since it was the only church in Spencertown.

One map suggests a steeple was added by 1808, although it may have been a mapmaker's convention rather than a depiction of the actual building. The town of Austerlitz was formally established by the state in 1818, with Spencertown serving as its center. In 1826 an African-American woman, Lilla Van Buren, was baptised and became a full member of the congregation.

=== 1826–1956: Relocation and expansion ===
A new pastor, Joel Osborne, began his tenure that year. He immediately oversaw the relocation of the dilapidated church building across the road. Its former site became the village green, a purpose it still serves.

A local contractor, Philo Beebe, handled not only the move but a $2,500 ($73,000 in contemporary dollars) expansion, adding the current front entrance and Federal style projection. The church still faced the road but was now looking east, as Christian churches generally tend to. The present steeple was built at this time as well, its design an echo of the Belfry on Philip Hookers' Albany North Dutch Reformed Church.

The new church was dedicated on New Year's Day of 1827. Four days later, it changed denominations to Presbyterianism. Congregants who wished to continue as Congregationalists went instead to a church in that denomination that had been started in 1792.

The Greek Revival entrance detail was probably added afterwards, between 1835 and 1840. The church at this time was also used for community functions such as fairs. Timothy Woodbridge, who wrote a memoir of his 1843–52 tenure as pastor called Autobiography of a Blind Minister, recalls an ornate floral wreath in what he describes as a German style on the rear wall over the pulpit. It likely dates to 1824 and is no longer extant, although traces have been discovered. Woodbridge, during his tenure, successfully lobbied the state legislature for the creation of Spencertown Academy a short distance to the east to train teachers.

A cemetery association was incorporated in 1850, following a pattern around the county. This seemed to ignore the cemetery's inclusion in the church's original incorporation 46 years earlier. It may have been done to ensure that the cemetery remained nondenominational.

Another set of repairs and renovations were made around 1863. It is possible from the date on the bell that it was installed at this time. The work cost another $2,500, but its exact nature is not known. It may have included a new rear wall and a reconfiguration of the interior layout. Since it was during the Civil War, when building materials were generally scarce and costly, it has been surmised that this was an emergency repair rather than one that had been planned for some time.

The iron fence may have been added to the cemetery at that time, since it is mentioned for the first time in an 1878 account by the county historian. He also refers to it as being jointly owned by the Presbyterian church and a Methodist church across the street, on what is now Route 203. In 1905 the church's trustees voted to transfer their interest in the cemetery to the association.

Church records indicate little more than routine repairs and maintenance throughout the first half of the 20th century. The building was equipped with electric light in 1926, and three years later the basement was dug to provide space for social events and a kitchen. During construction, bones were found, indicating that the 1826 relocation had been done over existing graves. All the gravestones and bodies were re-interred elsewhere in the cemetery.

Women of the church formed the Tower Club in 1930, as a response to the Depression that was beginning at the time. At first a social club that met in the tower (hence the name), they eventually began raising money for the church at Easter breakfasts and other events. Their fundraising made it possible for the church to insure the building, purchase a piano, electrify and waterproof the basement and furnish and later move the kitchen. After World War II, in the 1950s, they started an organ fund, which helped the church buy one in 1954. The organization continues today, helping to improve the church.

=== 1956–present: Restoration and preservation ===
In 1956 the church convened a new committee to study its interior and guide its restoration. After studying similar churches in nearby Bennington, Vermont and Connecticut, they recommended that the church use the 1826 post-relocation interior as its template, not the 1771 original. They also recommended removing a wall in the tower room and moving the organ and choir stairs to the side balcony from the rear after restoring the balcony. All of its recommendations were implemented. The work that was done uncovered paint traces in the rear suggesting the floral wreath Woodbridge had described.

Since then there have been a few more repairs and changes. The steeple was again repaired in 1974, and part of the balcony was set off for use as an office and conference room in 1989. A special capital-improvement fund was tapped in the early 1990s to add the wheelchair ramp, elevator, and other features required by the new federal legislation. During this project, the building was also repainted and the ceiling stabilized.

== See also ==
- National Register of Historic Places listings in Columbia County, New York
