= Spencertown Academy =

- U.S. National Register of Historic Places
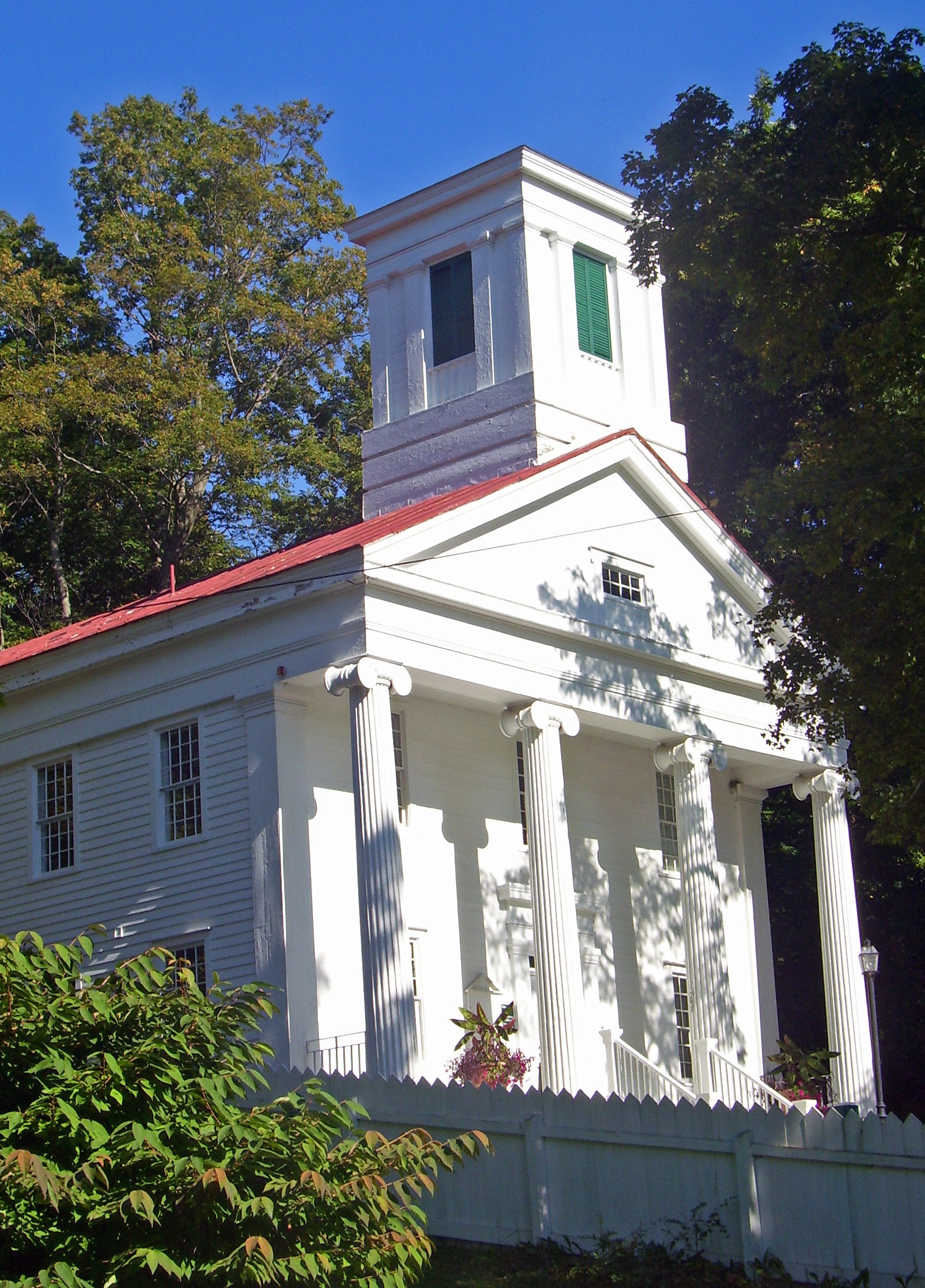
- South elevation and west profile, 2008

- Location within New York Location within the United States
- Location: Spencertown, New York
- Nearest city: Pittsfield, Massachusetts
- Coordinates: 42°19′21″N 73°32′40″W
- Built: 1847
- Architect: Benjamin Ambler
- Architectural style: Greek Revival
- NRHP reference No.: 73001174
- Added to NRHP: 1973

The former Spencertown Academy is located along the NY 203 state highway in Spencertown, New York, United States. It is a mid-19th-century building in the Greek Revival architectural style.

Founded as a private school for teacher training, it eventually became a public school. It continued to be used in that capacity until 1970. Three years later it was listed on the National Register of Historic Places. It is currently used as an arts center.

== Building ==
The building is located just northeast of Spencertown, the small center of the Town of Austerlitz, along the north side of Route 203. It is on a slight rise above road level, surrounded by woods on two of its three sides.

It is two stories tall, three bays wide by five deep, on a stone foundation with a gabled roof pierced by a belfry at the south end and a brick chimney at the north. It is sided in clapboard on the sides and rear and flushboard on the front. There is a fire escape on the rear.

The south (front) elevation has a pedimented portico with four fluted columns topped with Ionic capitals. A single rectangular window is located in the entablature. The pilasters at the corners of the walls are done as imitation antae, and the front entrance has a classically styled architrave. Pilasters also frame the louvered vents on the hip roofed belfry.

Inside, the first floor has two rooms. Upstairs is a library and auditorium.

== History ==
The academy was incorporated by an act of the state legislature in 1845, after extended lobbying by the Rev. Timothy Woodbridge, pastor of the nearby St. Peter's Presbyterian Church, for a school to train teachers for the region. The land was purchased for $224 ($8,000 in contemporary dollars). Local builder Benjamin Ambler did the construction for $2,459 ($85,000 in contemporary dollars). It was opened and dedicated in October 1847.

In 1863 some small repairs were done. Ten years later, it became a public school. Four decades later, in the 1910s and '20s, the only major physical changes were made to the building. The front porch was resurfaced in concrete in 1915, and the first story divided a decade later when modern heating and plumbing were added.

The newly formed Chatham Central School District took over control of the academy in 1955. It discontinued use of the building 15 years later. Two years later, local citizens formed the Spencertown Academy Society to save the building. It was originally intended to be reused as a community center, but since then has become the Spencertown Academy Arts Center, with galleries and studios and an auditorium for local visual and performing arts.

== See also ==
- National Register of Historic Places listings in Columbia County, New York
