= Millay Arts =

Coordinates: 42°19′17.22″N 73°26′28.79″W

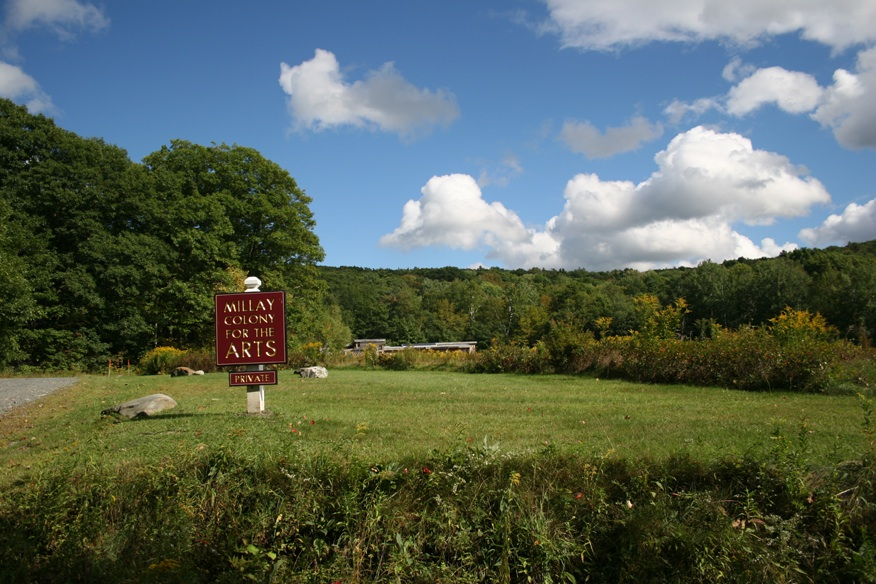

Millay Arts, formerly the Millay Colony for the Arts, is an arts community offering residency-retreats and workshops in Austerlitz, New York, and free arts programs in local public schools. Housed on the former property of feminist/activist poet and playwright Edna St. Vincent Millay, the Colony's campus offers residencies, retreats, and classes.

Millay Arts' Vincent is an annual journal featuring highlights of Art-in-Residence.

== History ==
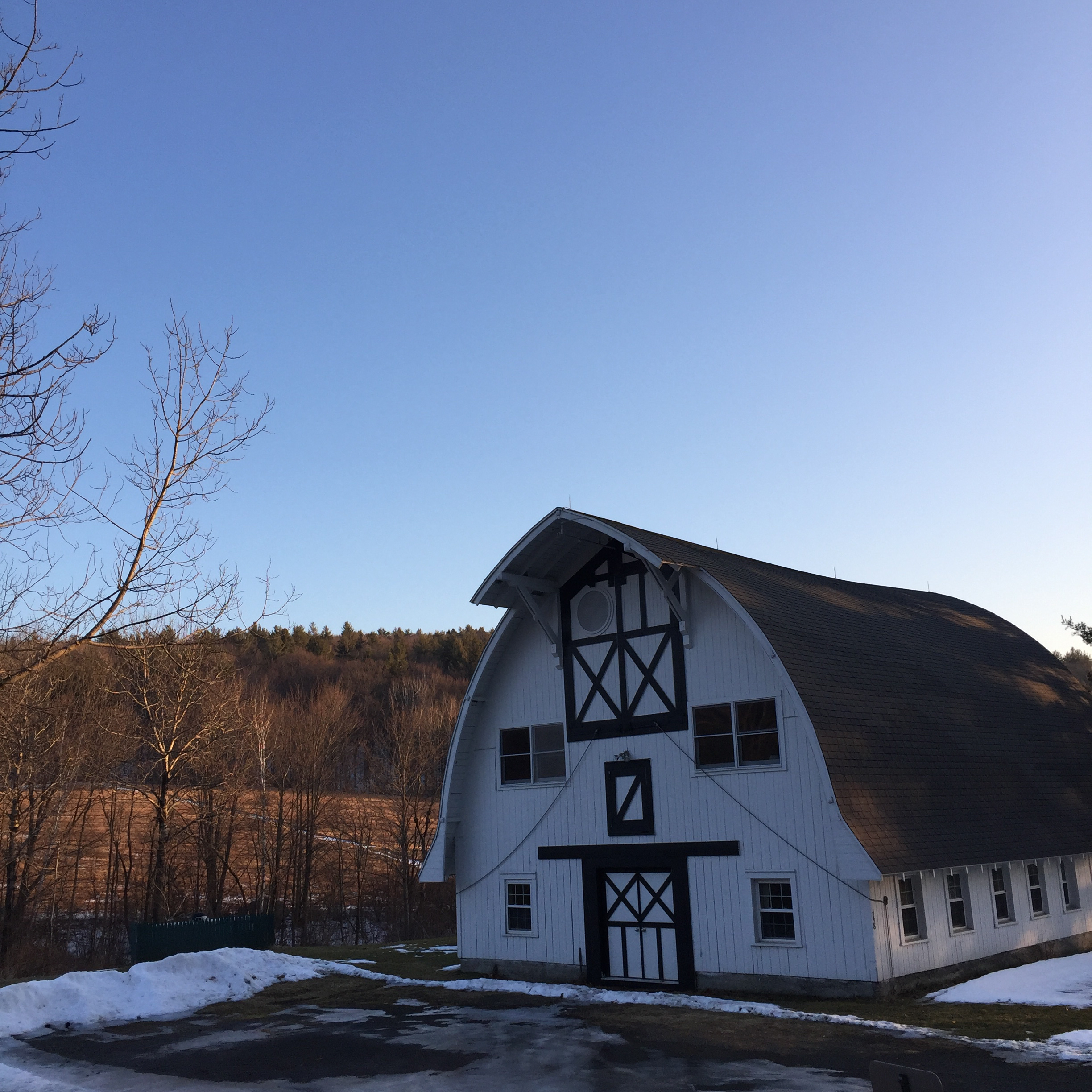

In 1925, Edna St. Vincent Millay bought Steepletop, a house with a blueberry farm in Austerlitz, NY, named after a pink, conical wildflower that grows there. With her husband, Millay built a barn from a Sears Roebuck kit, and then a writing cabin, and a tennis court.

After the poet's death in 1950, her sister Norma Millay Ellis moved to Steepletop. In 1973, she founded The Millay Colony, which was established as a nonprofit organization. Norma Millay Ellis donated the barn and surrounding acreage to The Millay Colony. The barn was subsequently renovated to provide accommodations and studio space for four resident artists.

In the mid-1990s, The Millay Colony commissioned architectural firm Michael Singer Studio, in consultation with an advisory committee of six artists with disabilities, to design an additional building for the Colony using the principles of universal access and environmentally friendly design.

This 3,550 square foot building currently houses The Millay Colony's offices and public rooms, and provides accommodations and studio space.

The house and gardens are a National Historic Landmark.

== Notable residents ==
=== Composing ===
- Linda Bouchard
- Andrea Clearfield
- Michael Harrison
- Laura Kaminsky
- Zibuokle Martinaityte
- Alex Weiser
- Alex Freeman

=== Fiction ===
- Zaki Baydoun
- Teresa Carmody
- Andrew Sean Greer
- Eugenia Kim (author)
- Paul Lisicky
- Carmen Maria Machado
- Sigrid Nunez
- Alice Sebold
- David Shields
- Masha Tupitsyn
- Rebecca Wolff

=== Non-fiction ===
- Nancy Milford
- Judith E. Stein
- Gary Krist (writer)

=== Playwriting ===
- Annie Baker
- Jennifer Haley
- Honor Molloy
- Jen Silverman
- Fiona Templeton

=== Poetry ===
- Nick Flynn
- Rachel Eliza Griffiths
- Nathan Hoks
- Stephen Motika
- Kay Ulanday Barrett
- Lia Purpura
- Evie Shockley
- Danez Smith

=== Screenwriting ===
- Adam Baran

=== Visual arts ===
- Louise Belcourt
- Isa Leshko
- Julia Dault
- B.A. Van Sise
- Wlodzimierz Ksiazek
