= Steepletop =

Historic house in New York, United States

- Edna St. Vincent Millay House & Gardens (Steepletop)
- U.S. National Register of Historic Places
- U.S. National Historic Landmark
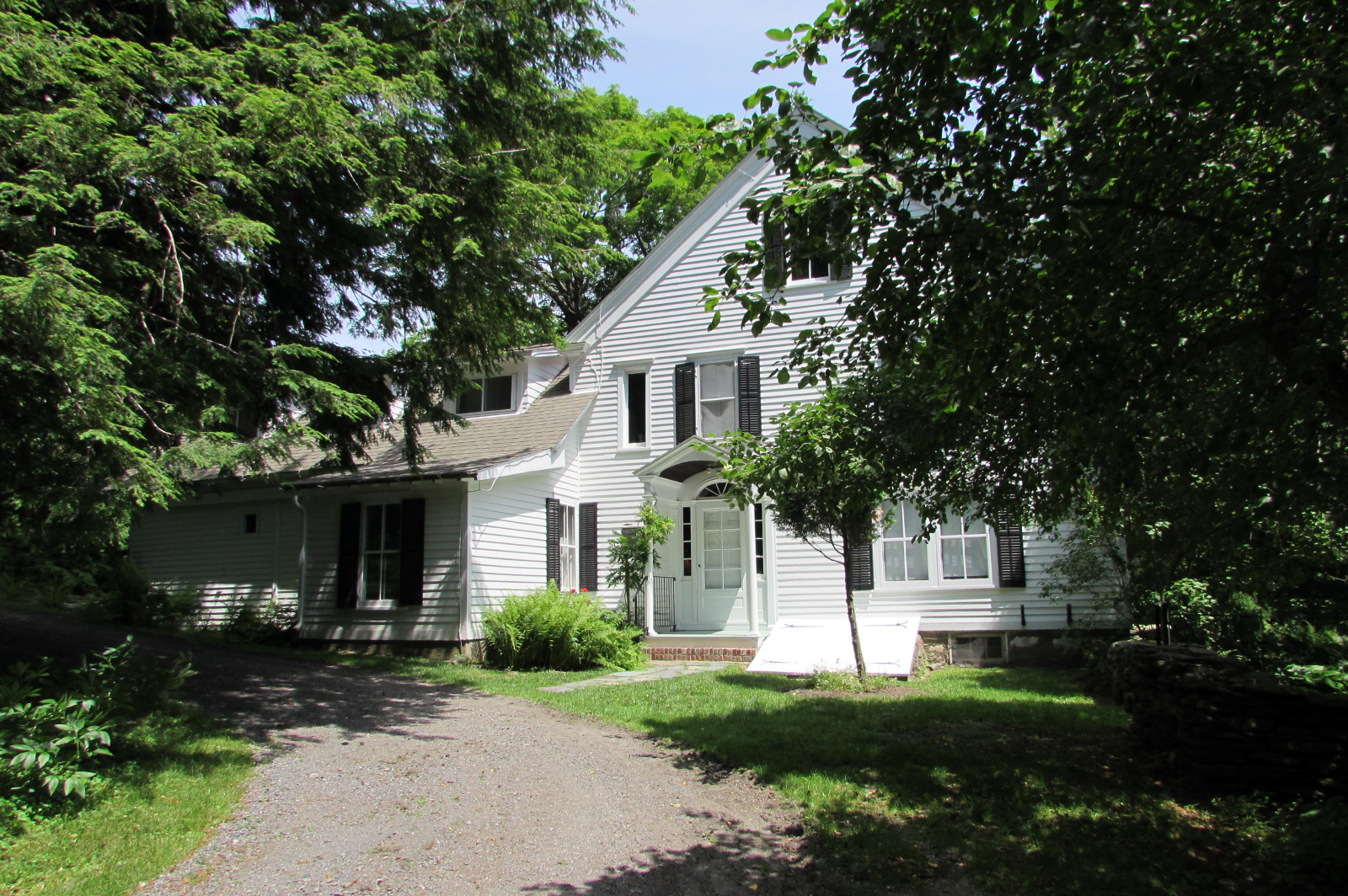
- Front (south) elevation of main house, 2014

- Location within New York Location within the United States
- Location: East Hill Road, Austerlitz, NY
- Nearest city: Pittsfield, MA
- Coordinates: 42°19′17.30″N 73°26′39.15″W
- Area: 500 acres (200 ha)
- Built: c. 1870
- NRHP reference No.: 71000534

Significant dates
- Added to NRHP: November 11, 1971
- Designated NHL: November 11, 1971

Steepletop, also known as the Edna St. Vincent Millay House, was the farmhouse home of Pulitzer Prize-winning poet Edna St. Vincent Millay and her husband Eugen Jan Boissevain, in Austerlitz, New York, United States. Her former home and gardens are maintained by the Edna St. Vincent Millay Society, a nonprofit organization that also holds the rights to the poet's intellectual property. Steepletop was declared a National Historic Landmark on November 11, 1971.

The Millay Colony for the Arts, founded by Norma Millay Ellis, sister of the poet and heir to her estate, is located on an adjacent plot of land. In 1973, it was established as a separate nonprofit organization from the Edna St. Vincent Millay society (aka, "Millay Society"). The Society opened the Steapletop for tours in 2010.

The name Steepletop comes from a pink, conical wildflower that grows there known as Steeplebush.

== Property ==
Steepletop is a 500-acre (200 ha) estate on a hilly, wooded area in the northeastern corner of the town near the Massachusetts state line. Although located within the range of the Taconic Mountains, the area is adjacent to the Berkshire Hills and is considered part of the cultural region of the Berkshires, known for its rich diversity in music, arts and recreation. The property is abutted on some areas by Beebe Hill and Harvey Mountain State Forest. It can be reached by taking partially paved East Hill Road to the main complex from the NY 22 state highway in the narrow valley to its west.

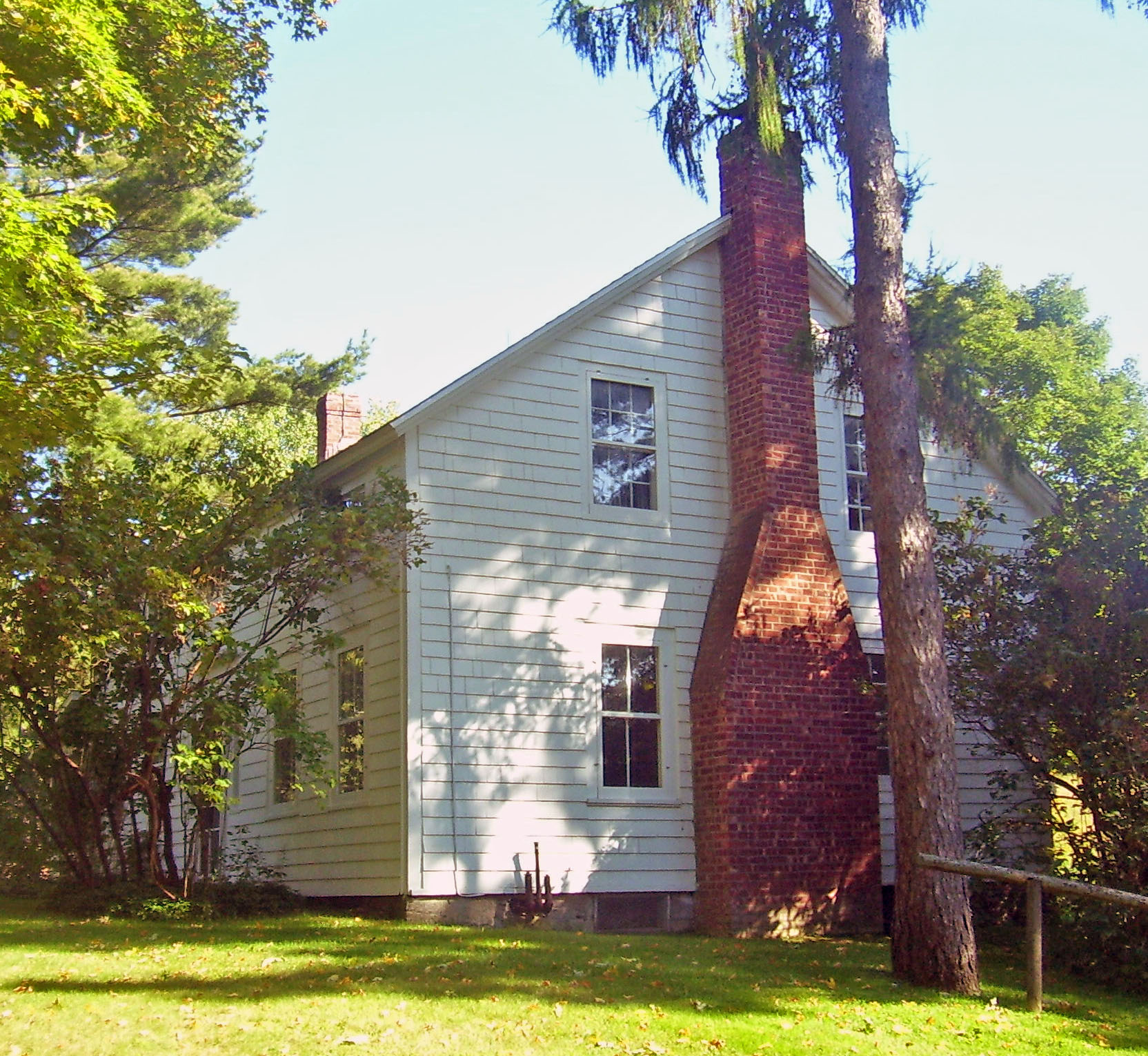
Former guest house, currently used as the Steepletop Visitors Center

East Hill leads through the Steepletop property, on a rolling section of cleared land in the middle of the woods. Its most visible building is the guest house on the east side of the road, currently used as the Millay Society's offices. It is a two-story building, sided in shingles with a gabled roof and two exterior brick chimneys. To its southeast is a stable now used as a garage, with a second floor studio. A barn with curved roof is located on the northeast.

Just north of it, across the road, is the main house, Millay's primary home during her years of residence. It is a two-story white clapboard-sided house with a steep gabled roof and central chimney, built into ground that rises up from the short unpaved driveway on the west. A one-and-a-half-story wing projects from the north.

The four-bay west (front) facade has a single-bay, single-story gabled porch sheltering the main entrance, a doorway with sidelights and transom. The north wing has three shed-roofed dormer windows, an interior chimney and a single-bay, single-story projection on its west just north of the main entrance. Its north end has a double door and single window in the gable field. On the wing's east side is a screened porch with a single shed dormer above.

Behind the main door is a small full-length hallway with stone floor. It is decorated with photographs of Millay and art objects collected by her and Boissevain, including a bust of Sappho and a desk made for Millay. An adjacent parlor has a wide brick mantelpiece and paintings of and by Norma Ellis and her husband Charles, who lived in the house after her sister's death. At the east end of the hall is the dining room.

To its north is the kitchen, as remodeled by Ladies' Home Journal in 1947 for a feature story, by their friend and an editor at the magazine, Alice Blinn. Its pantry is to the west, with a small room containing a wood stove on the north. Beyond that is a large storage room with concrete floor, bathroom and closet. It contains file cabinets with recordings of readings of Millay's work.

A stairway leads up to the second floor, with the library on the south. All its walls have shelves of Millay's books. At the northeast corner is her bedroom, which still has furniture she bought and dresses she wore to poetry readings. A newer bedroom, used by her sister and her husband, is to the west.

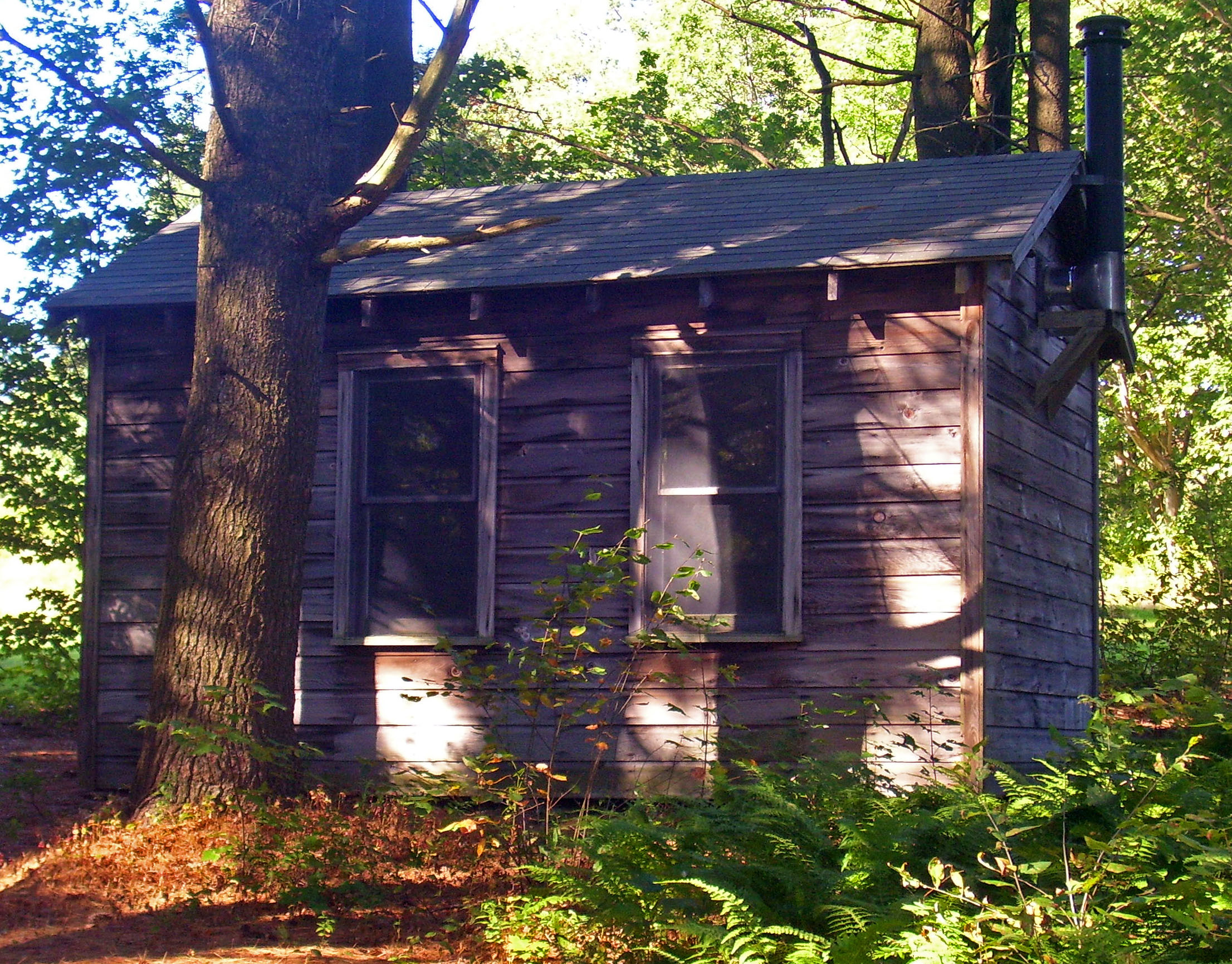
Millay's writing cabin

Northwest of the house is a small one-story wooden cabin, used by Millay as a writing studio. It has a door at the west end, one window on the north face and two on the south. Within are a stove, chaise longue, bureau, desk and chair, and a table with magazines from 1949, all as Millay left it.

Farther away from the house are two more buildings and Millay's grave. A gabled icehouse is to the north; the Ellises converted it into a workroom and storage space. West of the driveway is a swimming pool complex, with a roofed terrace Millay referred to as "the bar" and lawn she called "the dingle". Her gravesite is off a dirt road that branches off to the west from East Hill a thousand feet (305 m) north of the main house.

== History ==
The guest house is believed to have been built in the late 18th century, considerably predating the main house, which is believed to have been built around 1870. Millay and Boissevain bought the property, which had been a 635-acre (257 ha) blueberry farm and moved in in 1925, after the period in which critics and scholars generally believe she had done her best work. She continued to write since the rural setting provided sufficient distance from the outside world, and the couple lived there except for periods of travel.

The couple built the barn shortly after moving in, from a kit they bought from Sears. Millay grew her own vegetables in a small garden near the icehouse, and had the writing cabin built. The couple also had a tennis court built.

After World War II, in the late 1940s, she left Steepletop less frequently. Boissevain died in 1949, making her even more reclusive in the year before she was found dead at the foot of the stairway in the main house. The fall was the proximate cause of death, but what led to it is unknown.

Her sister Norma and her husband, painter Charles Ellis, moved in afterwards. In 1973, they established Millay Colony for the Arts on the seven acres (2.8 hectares) around the guest house and barn. After her husband's death in 1976, Norma continued to manage the colony program until her death in 1986. During that time, in 1980, she renovated the barn into housing for visiting artists. In 1997, a disabled-accessible main building was built on colony property. The colony continues to offer one-month residencies to writers, visual artists and composers from the U.S. and other countries.

In 2006, the state of New York paid $1.69 million to acquire 230 acres (0.93 km^{2}) of Steepletop, to add the land to a nearby state forest preserve. The proceeds of the sale were used by the Edna St. Vincent Millay Society to restore the farmhouse and grounds and turn it into a museum. The museum opened to the public in the summer of 2010, and guided tours of Steepletop and Millay's gardens were available from the end of May through the middle of October. Effective November 2018, Steepletop closed to the public due to financial challenges and restoration needs. Fundraising efforts continue as do considerations for the future of this museum house. Parts of the grounds of Steepletop, including the Millay Poetry Trail that leads to her grave, are now open for occasional scheduled events.

The Edna St. Vincent Millay Society remains in charge of the main house, the outbuildings around it and the grounds as a whole. It operates the property as a historic house museum dedicated to Millay and has spent much effort on restoring the house and grounds. In 2003, the Friends of the Millay Society built the Millay Poetry Trail along the dirt road leading to her grave and those of several family members. The trail is open to the public and posted with her nature poetry along the shaded route.

== See also ==
- List of National Historic Landmarks in New York
- National Register of Historic Places listings in Columbia County, New York
