= Ragged Island (Harpswell, Maine) =

Island in Cumberland County, Maine, United States

Ragged Island is a privately owned island in Harpswell, Maine, United States, in Cumberland County, which is geographically within Casco Bay in the Gulf of Maine. It is located at 43°43′39″N 69°56′13″W.

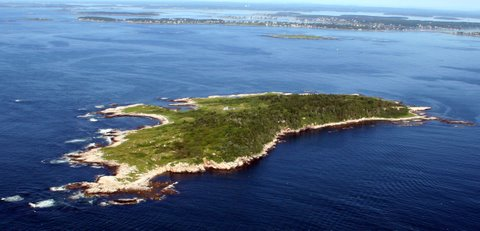
Ragged Island, aerial view

== History ==
Ragged Island was the summer home of poet Edna St. Vincent Millay and husband Eugen Jan Boissevain, who purchased it in 1933. Millay's poems included Ragged Island published in 1954 in the volume Mine, the Harvest, four years after her death.

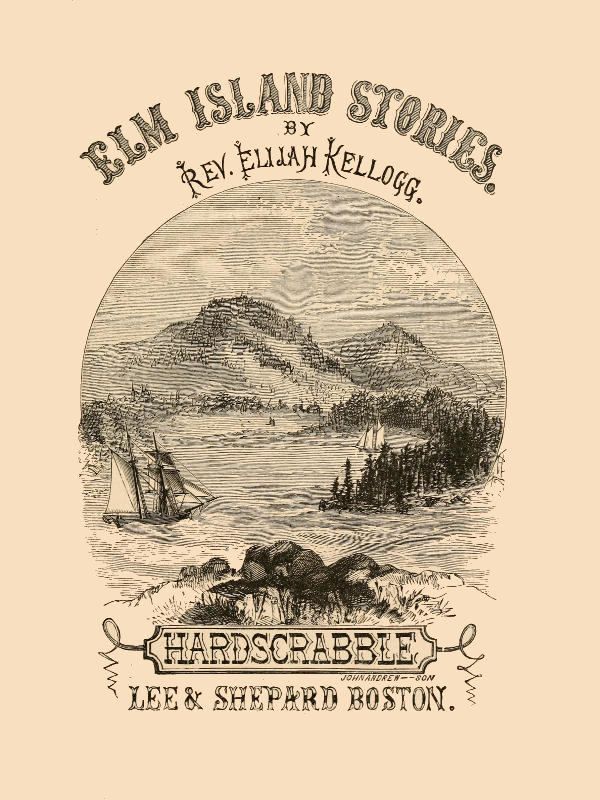
An image from an 1871 edition of Elm Island Stories by Elijah Kellogg, with the setting for the stories inspired in part by Ragged Island where he summered.

The island was owned previously by author and Congregational minister Elijah Kellogg, who used it as one inspiration for the settings in his Elm Island series of children's books and other fictional works. Kellogg had become familiar with Ragged Island after invitations by an island resident named Thomas Scofield to deliver sermons to the Scofield family, with Kellogg eventually purchasing the island.

Known in the 18th century as Raggedarse Island, Capt. Parker's Island and alternatively Parker's Island, Ragged Island was purchased in 1777 by William Black and Josiah Clark. By 1807, Black's daughter Elizabeth Meyer sold Ragged Island to James Sinnett. In an 1832 history of Maine that included a catalog of islands in Casco Bay, Ragged Island was described as uninhabited.

Scofield moved to Ragged Island in 1833, and within a few years created a protected boat basin by clearing a channel from a small cove at the southwest end of the island into a low-lying interior section of the island. During the work, Scofield excavated bones from an unidentified creature measuring more than 65 feet in length by his estimate. A subsequent examination of portions of the skeleton by naturalists led them to the conclusion the creature could have been between 85 feet and 110 feet in length, according to a newspaper account of an 1883 meeting of the Portland Natural History Society. Bones that had been removed from Ragged Island were destroyed in an 1852 fire in Portland, and no further evidence of the skeleton was found in subsequent surveys of the site.

During his years on Ragged Island, Scofield built a pair of fishing schooners with wood he harvested from Mark Island lying to the east.

On 5 February, 1891, the Town of Harpswell annexed Ragged Island from Phippsburg with the approval of the Maine State Legislature.

In February 1927, a finback whale carcass was discovered on the island's shore by lobstermen based at Orr's Island. The carcass was estimated at 50 feet in length and 33 tons, with a retired whaling captain supervising the removal of baleen, the harvest of meat as bait for lobster traps, and the reduction of the whale's blubber to oil for sale as a paint additive.

Playwrights Claire and Paul Sifton purchased Ragged Island from the Millay estate. The Millay house burned down in 1969, with the Siftons building a new house over the course of two summers while living in a tent.

Artists to have produced works based on Ragged Island scenes include John Marin and Ernest Haskell.

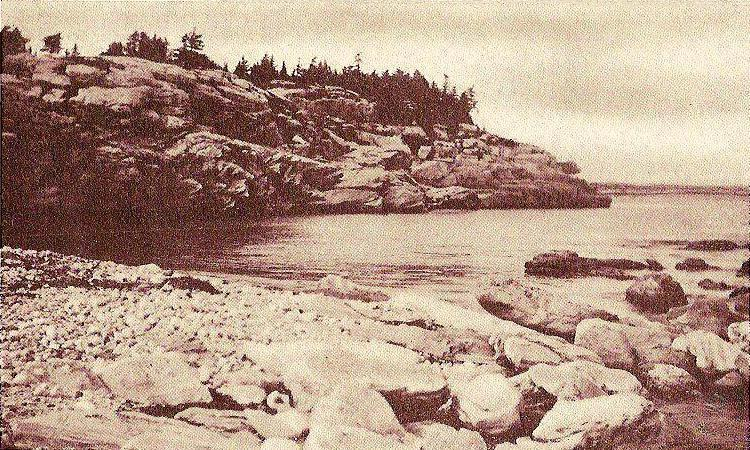
Ragged Island in c. 1920

== Ecology and conservation ==
Ragged Island provides habitat for a large and diverse population of nesting seabirds, including great blue heron, harlequin duck, eider duck, black guillemot, greater black-backed gull, herring gull and osprey.

In 2021, researchers successfully tagged a great blue heron on Harpswell to track its movements, determining that the bird was part of the Ragged Island colony. Over the span of a week, "Ragged Richard" traveled as far as 17 miles between the Ragged Island colony and inland as far as Durham to feed in a stream.

Since 2020, the Maine Department of Marine Resources has tracked "inshore" movements of great white sharks in Casco Bay. Acoustic receivers at Ragged Island recorded among the highest numbers of nearby sharks tagged with acoustic transmitters between 2020 and 2023, before recordings dropped in 2024.

The Maine Coast Heritage Trust led an effort to protect the island, and in 2008 the U.S. Fish and Wildlife Service’s National Coastal Wetlands Conservation Grant program awarded a $323,000 Coastal Wetland grant to purchase a conservation easement on the property, amid nearly $1.5 million in total funding to protect seabird nesting areas on Ragged Island and nearby Flag Island. The easement, held by Maine Coast Heritage Trust, permanently protects the 76.6-acre (310,000 m^{2}) natural area used by seabirds for nesting on Ragged Island.

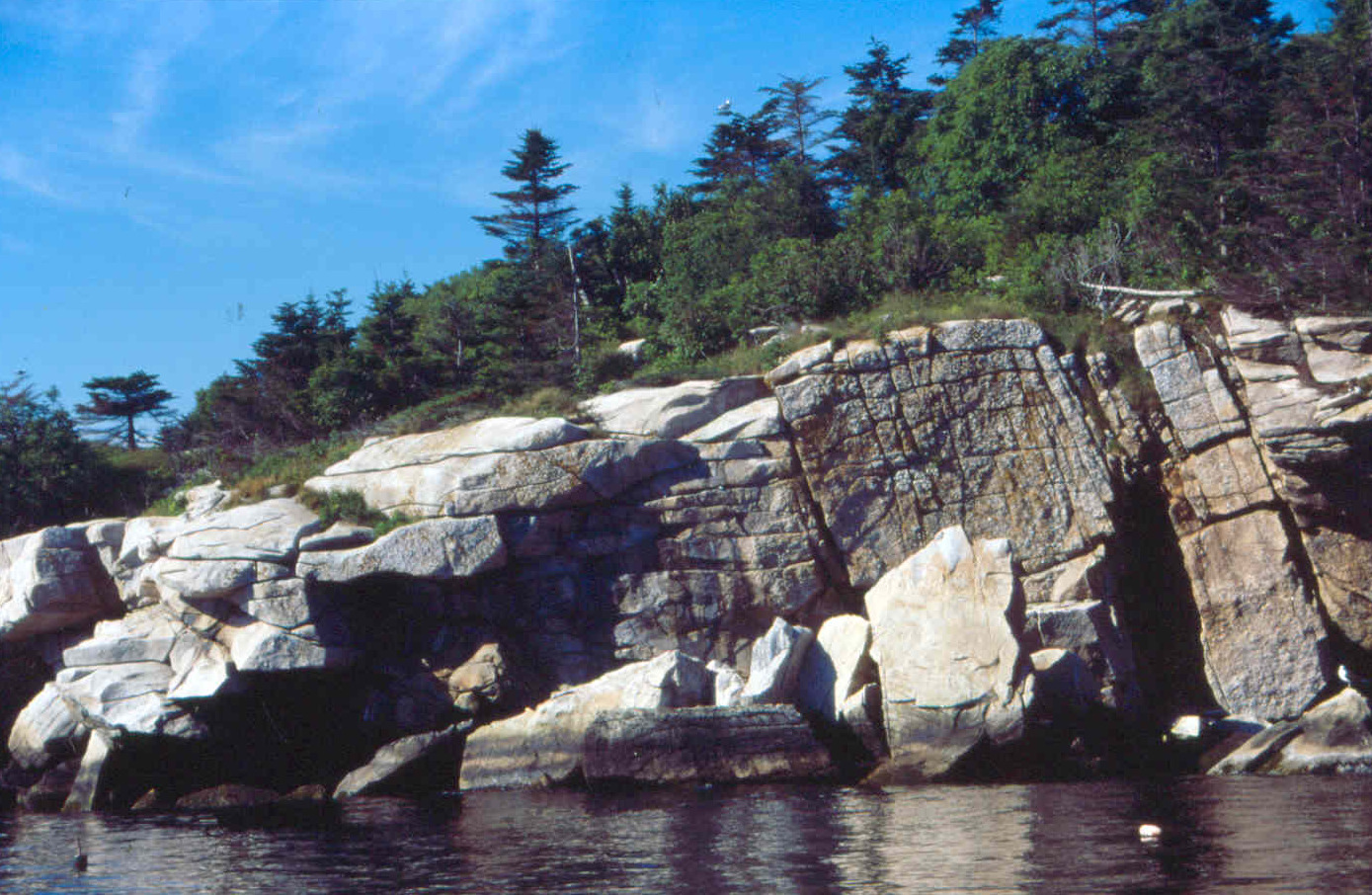
Ragged Island, shoreline

== Notable people ==
- Edna St. Vincent Millay, poet
- Elijah Kellogg, minister, lecturer, author
