= Norma Millay =

American actress (1894–1986)

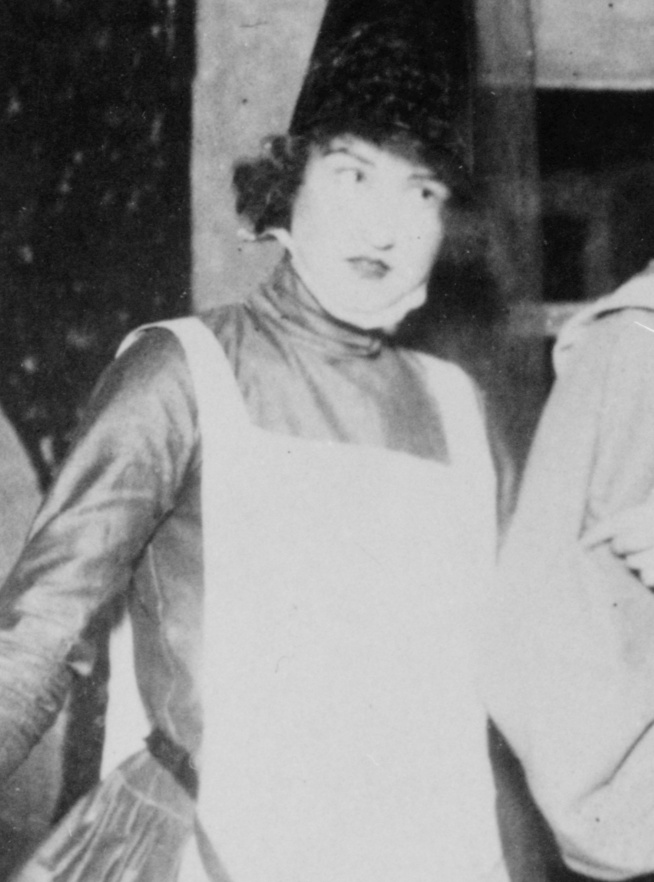
Norma Millay on stage, circa 1917

Norma Millay (1894 – May 14, 1986) was an American singer and actress, and sister of the poet and playwright Edna St. Vincent Millay. Born in Rockland, Maine to Cora Lounella Buzelle and Henry Tolman Millay, Norma Millay was one of three sisters who were all, due to their parents' divorce, brought up by their mother. Having been a writer of poetry herself, Cora Millay ensured the presence of art and music in the Millay household, which became a vital part of the upbringing of the three sisters. As a young woman, Norma Millay performed with the Provincetown Players and appeared on Broadway. She married painter and actor Charles Ellis, but did not use his surname.

At the time of her sister Edna St. Vincent Millay's death in 1950, Norma Millay was left as the sole heir to her estate, leaving her to inherit Steepletop, a 650-acre farm in Austerlitz, New York, where the poet had spent the last twenty-five years of her life, as well as rights to all of her creative and intellectual property. In 1973, Norma Millay created the Millay Colony for the Arts, right next to Steepletop, as a center for burgeoning artists, offering residency and workshops for them to refine their craft.

After attempting to write a biography of her sister Edna on her own, Norma contacted the biographer Nancy Milford to write one in her stead. She did not live to see the 2001 publication of Milford's biography Savage Beauty: The Life of Edna St. Vincent Millay.
