= Pratt Homestead =

Historic house in New York, United States

- U.S. National Register of Historic Places
- Location within New York Location within the United States
- Location: 866 Rt. 203; Spencertown, New York
- Coordinates: 42°19′44″N 73°33′04″W
- Area: 8.8 acres (3.6 ha)
- Built: 1760
- Architectural style: Georgian
- NRHP reference No.: 09000907
- Added to NRHP: October 2, 2009

The Pratt Homestead, in Spencertown, New York along SR 203, was added to the National Register of Historic Places in 2009. Its historic significance is attributed to the degree of attention given to its restoration. It was built around 1760 by a family of Spencertown known to have been among the founding members of this community. It served many purposes, among them being agricultural livestock management, as well as a primary residence.

In its 2008 National Register nomination it was deemed:

s architecturally and historically significant as a distinctive example of a mid-18th-century house built in the design and with the construction methods of the Connecticut River Valley that is a landmark of the migration of New England settlers into eastern New York in the years prior to the Revolutionary War. Erected sometime after 1757, when the Pratt family is reputed to have purchased lots in Spencertown, the twostory, center chimney house employing plank wall construction is quite unlike the domestic architecture indigenous to New York in the period. In addition, the plan and decoration of the interior epitomizes Connecticut building and design traditions.
