= Spencertown, New York =

- Hamlet
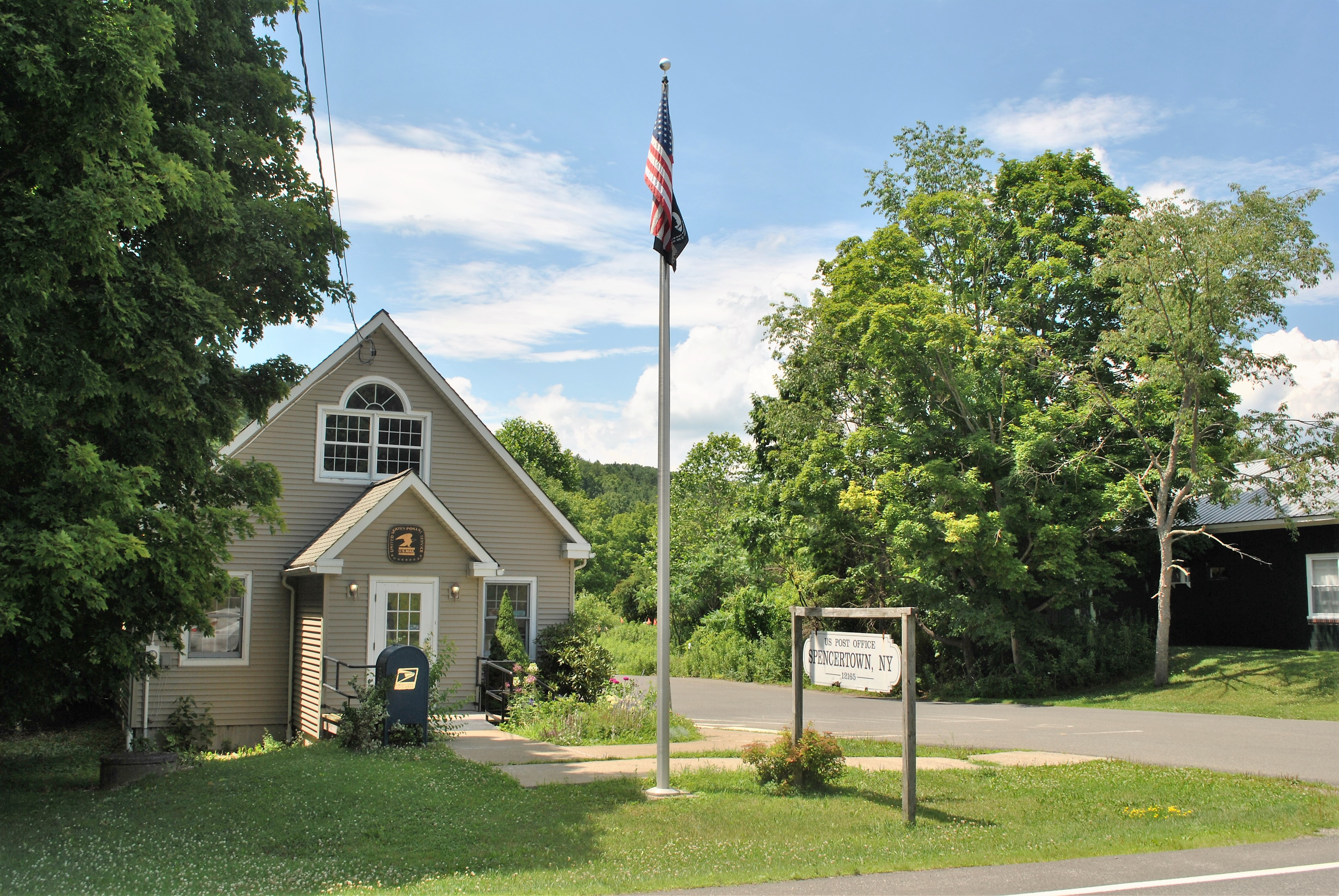

- Location within New York
- Coordinates: 42°19′24″N 73°32′45″W
- Country: United States
- State: New York
- County: Columbia
- Town: Austerlitz
- Elevation: 686 ft (209 m)
- Time zone: UTC-5 (Eastern (EST))
  - Summer (DST): UTC-4 (EDT)
- ZIP code: 12165
- Area code: 518
- GNIS feature ID: 965990

Spencertown is a hamlet in the town of Austerlitz, Columbia County, New York, United States. Its ZIP code is 12165.

The Daniel and Clarissa Baldwin House, Pratt Homestead, Spencertown Academy, and St. Peter's Presbyterian Church and Spencertown Cemetery are listed on the National Register of Historic Places.

== Gallery ==
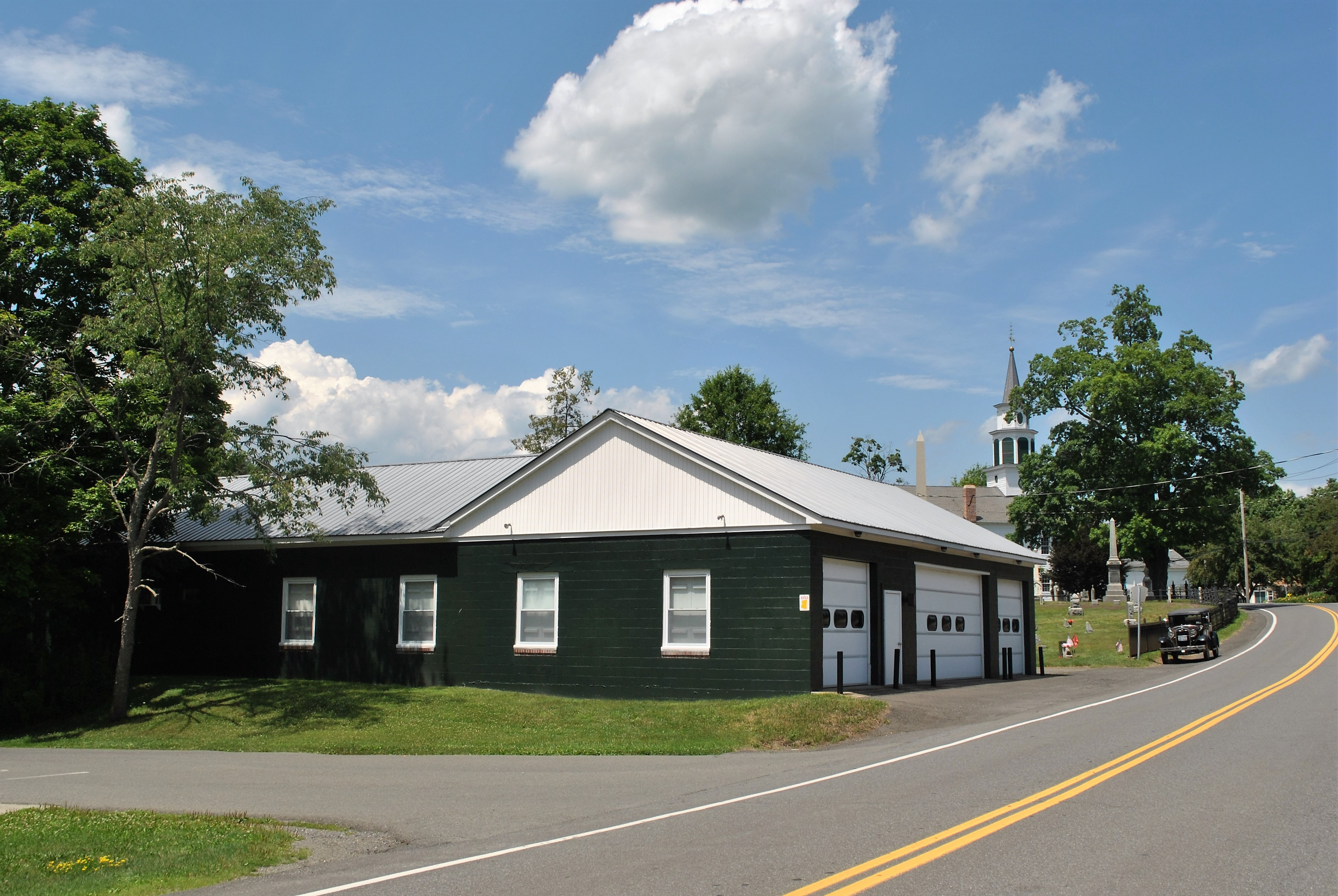

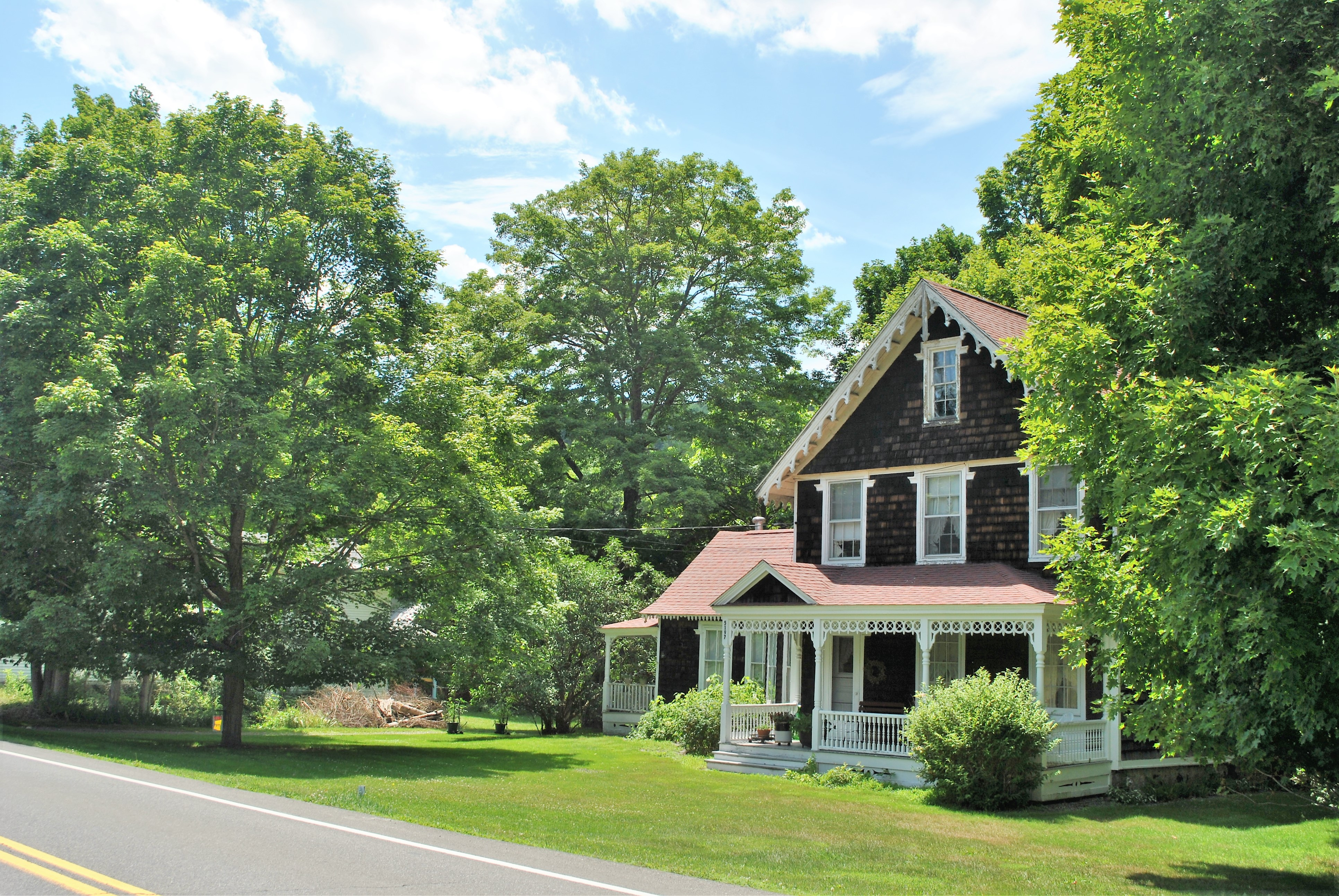
