= Daniel and Clarissa Baldwin House =

Historic house in New York, United States

- U.S. National Register of Historic Places
- Location within New York Location within the United States
- Location: 1018 Dugway Rd., Spencertown, New York
- Coordinates: 42°19′02″N 73°32′11″W
- Area: 19.29 acres (7.81 ha)
- Built: c. 1807, c. 1835
- Architectural style: Federal
- NRHP reference No.: 12000366
- Added to NRHP: June 27, 2012

The Daniel and Clarissa Baldwin House is a historic house located at 1018 Dugway Road in Spencertown, Columbia County, New York, United States.

== Description and history ==
The house was built in about 1807, and is a two-story, five-bay wide, Federal style frame dwelling with a rear kitchen ell. It has a low pitched side gable roof and interior gable end chimneys. A front piazza supported by four Doric order columns was added about 1880. Also on the property are the contributing barn (c. 1835), ice house, stone dam, and garage.

It was added to the National Register of Historic Places on June 27, 2012.
