= Edna St. Vincent Millay =

American poet (1892–1950)

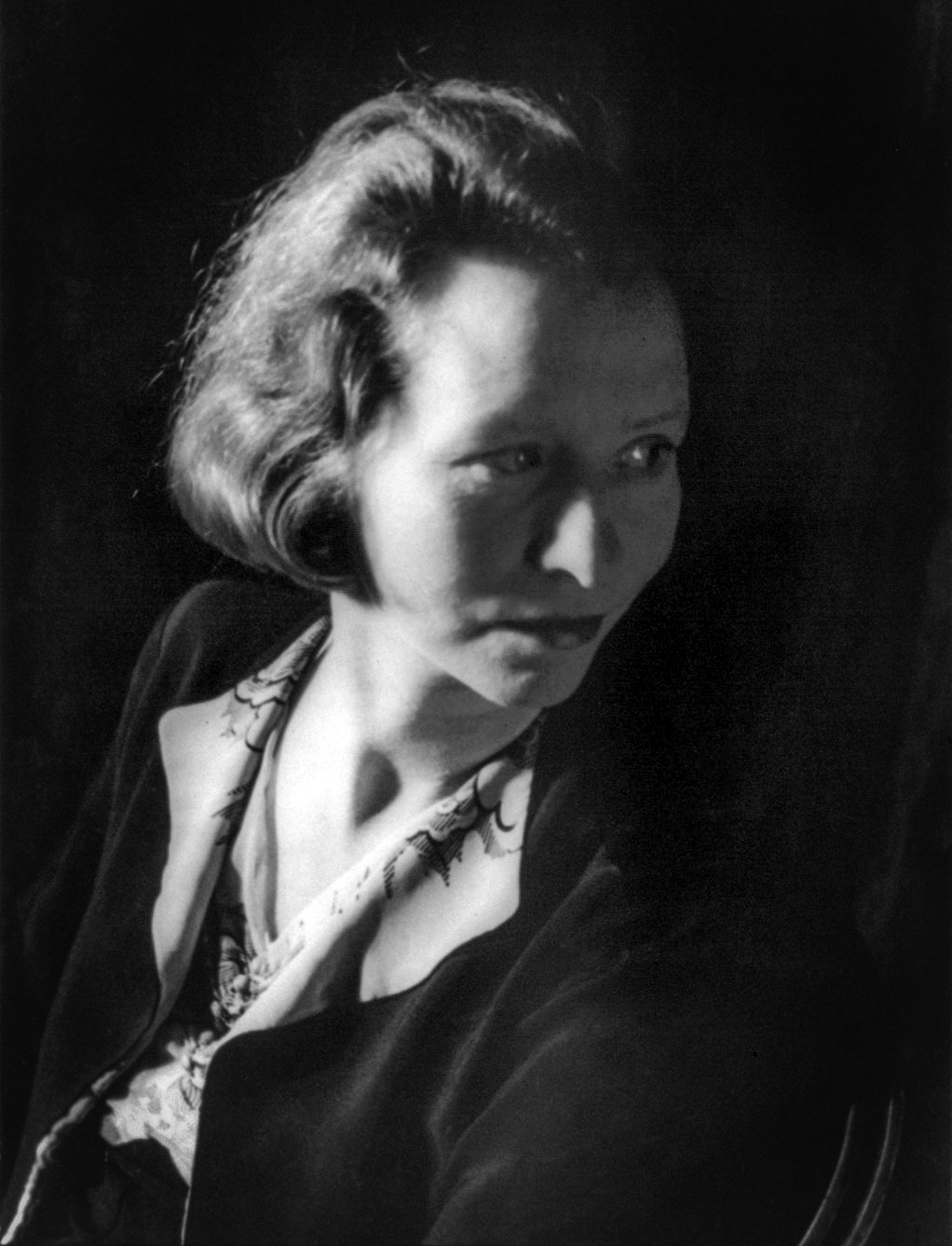
- Millay, photographed by Carl Van Vechten, 1933
- Born: February 22, 1892; Rockland, Maine, US
- Died: October 19, 1950 (aged 58); Austerlitz, New York, US
- Education: Vassar College (AB)
- Occupations: Poet; playwright; author
- Spouse: Eugen Jan Boissevain (m. 1923; died 1949)
- Writing career
- Pen name: Nancy Boyd
- Notable awards: Pulitzer Prize for Poetry (1923); Robert Frost Medal (1943)

Signature
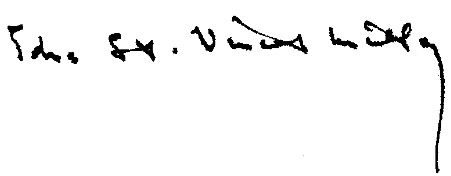

Edna St. Vincent Millay (February 22, 1892 – October 19, 1950) was an American lyrical poet and playwright. Millay was a renowned social figure and noted feminist in New York City during the Roaring Twenties and beyond. She also wrote prose under the pseudonym Nancy Boyd.

Millay won the 1923 Pulitzer Prize for Poetry for her poem "Ballad of the Harp-Weaver"; she was the first woman and second person to win the award. In 1943, Millay was the sixth person and the second woman to be awarded the Frost Medal for her lifetime contribution to American poetry.

Millay was highly regarded during much of her lifetime, with the prominent literary critic Edmund Wilson calling her "one of the only poets writing in English in our time who have attained to anything like the stature of great literary figures.'' By the 1930s, her critical reputation began to decline, as modernist critics dismissed her work for its use of traditional poetic forms and subject matter, in contrast to modernism's exhortation to "make it new." However, the rise of feminist literary criticism in the 1960s and 1970s revived an interest in Millay's works.

== Early life ==
Millay was born Edna Saint Vincent Millay in Rockland, Maine, on February 22, 1892. Her parents were Cora Lounella Buzelle, a custom hair stylist and training nurse for private families, and Henry Tolman Millay, a life insurance agent and teacher who would later become a superintendent of schools. Her middle name derives from St. Vincent's Hospital in New York City, where her uncle's life had been saved from an accident at sea just before her birth. Encouraged to read the classics at home, she was too rebellious to make a success of formal education, but she won poetry prizes from an early age.

Edna's mother attended a Congregational church. In 1904, Cora divorced Millay's father for improvidence and domestic abuse. They had already been separated for some years. Henry and Edna kept a letter correspondence for many years, but he never re-entered the family. Cora and her three daughters – Edna (who called herself "Vincent"), Norma Lounella, and Kathleen Kalloch (born 1896) – moved from town to town, living in poverty and surviving various illnesses. Cora travelled with a trunk full of classic literature, including Shakespeare and Milton, which she read to her children. The family settled in a small house on the property of Cora's aunt in Camden, Maine, where Millay would write the first of the poems that would bring her literary fame. The family's house in Camden was "between the mountains and the sea where baskets of apples and drying herbs on the porch mingled their scents with those of the neighboring pine woods."

The three sisters were independent and outspoken, which did not always sit well with the authority figures in their lives. Millay's grade school principal, offended by her frank attitude, refused to call her Vincent. Instead, he called her by any woman's name that started with a V. At Camden High School, Millay began developing her literary talents, starting at the school's literary magazine, The Megunticook. At 14, she won the St. Nicholas Gold Badge for poetry. By 15, she had published her poetry in the popular children's magazine St. Nicholas, the Camden Herald, and the high-profile anthology Current Literature.

== Emerging fame and college education ==
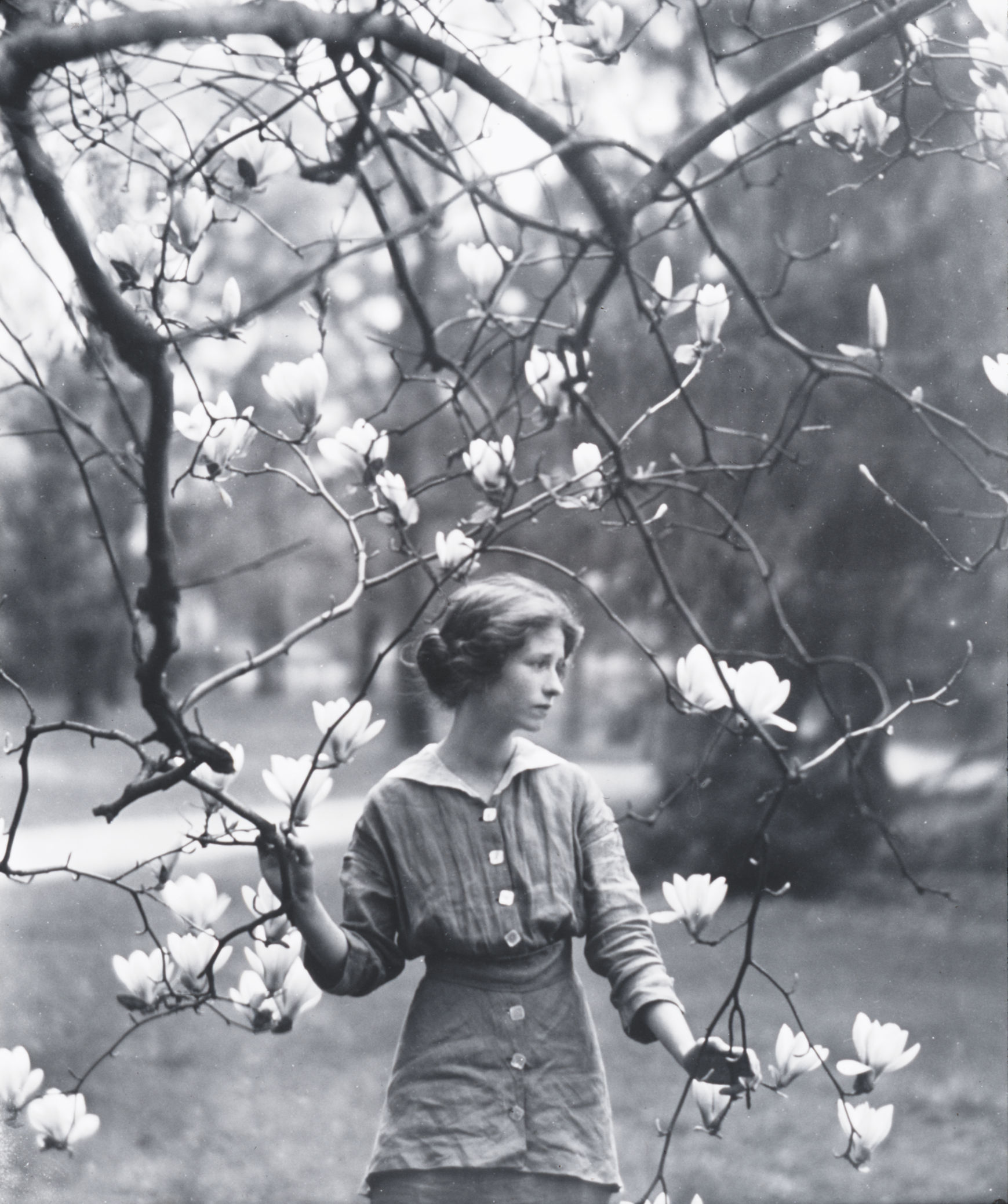
Millay photographed by Arnold Genthe in 1914 in Mamaroneck, New York

Millay's fame began in 1912 when, at the age of 20, she entered her poem "Renascence" in a poetry contest in The Lyric Year. The backer of the contest, Ferdinand P. Earle, chose Millay as the winner after sorting through thousands of entries, reading only two lines apiece. Earle sent a letter informing Millay of her win before consulting with the other judges, who had previously and separately agreed on a criterion for a winner to winnow down the massive flood of entrants. According to the remaining judges, the winning poem had to exhibit social relevance, and "Renascence" did not. The entry of Orrick Glenday Johns, "Second Avenue", was about the "squalid scenes" Johns saw on Eldridge Street and lower Second Avenue on New York's Lower East Side. Millay ultimately placed fourth. The press drew attention to the fact that the Millays were a family of working-class women living in poverty. Because the three winners were men, some people felt that sexism and classism were a factor in Millay's poem coming in fourth place.

Controversy in newspaper columns and editorial pages launched the careers of Millay and Johns. Johns, who was receiving hate mail, conceded that he thought her poem was better. "The award was as much an embarrassment to me as a triumph," he said. Johns did not attend the awards banquet. The second-prize winner offered Millay his $250 prize money. In the immediate aftermath of the Lyric Year controversy, wealthy arts patron Caroline B. Dow heard Millay reciting her poetry and playing the piano at the Whitehall Inn in Camden, Maine and was so impressed that she offered to pay for Millay's education at Vassar College.

Millay entered Vassar College in 1913 at age 21. Her attendance at Vassar, which she called a "hell-hole", became a strain to her due to its strict nature. Before she attended college, Millay had a liberal home life that included smoking, drinking, playing gin rummy, and flirting with men. Vassar, on the other hand, expected its students to be refined and live according to their status as young ladies. Millay often would not be formally reprimanded out of respect of her work. At the end of her senior year in 1917, the faculty voted to suspend Millay indefinitely; however, in response to a petition by her peers, she was allowed to graduate. She was a prominent campus writer, becoming a regular contributor to The Vassar Miscellany. She had relationships with many fellow students during her time there and kept scrapbooks including drafts of plays written during the period. While at school, she had several romantic relationships with women, including Edith Wynne Matthison, who would go on to become an actress in silent films.

== Move to Greenwich Village ==
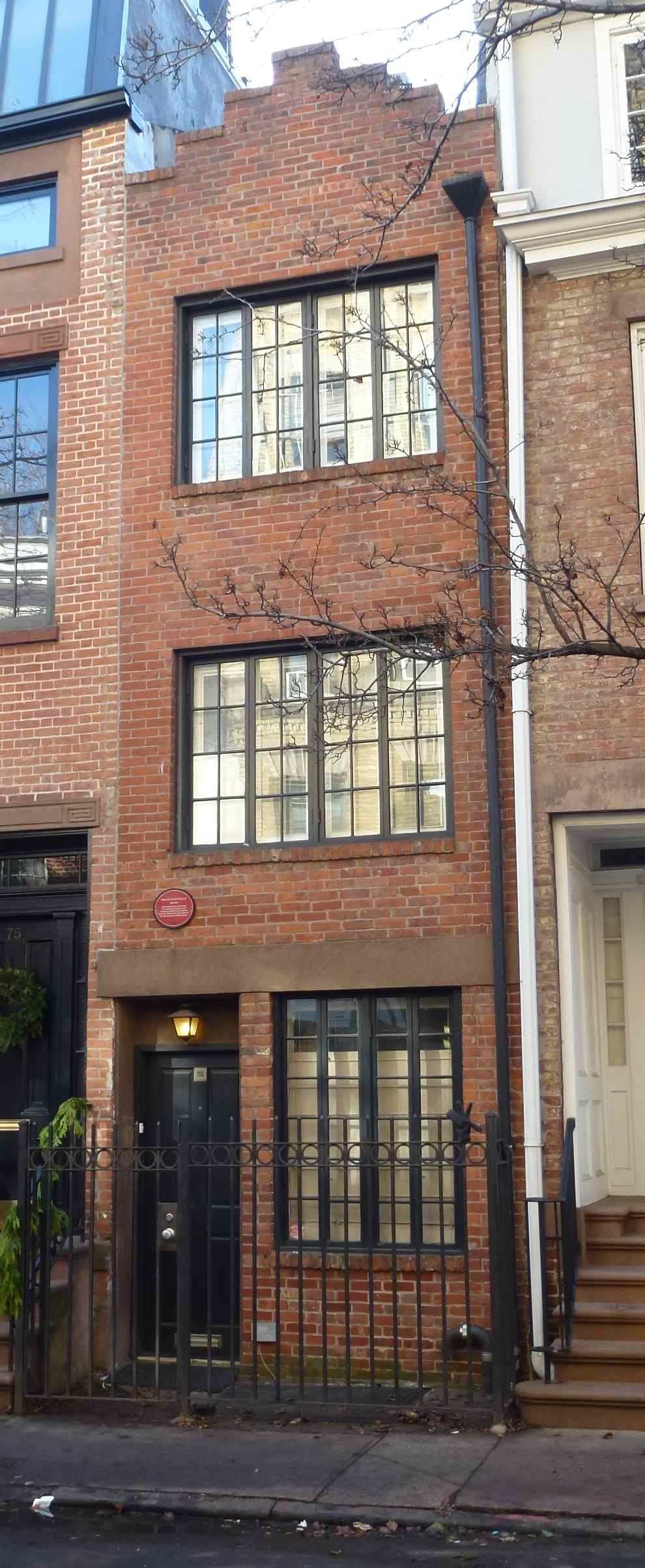
Millay's 1923–24 home: 75 1/2 Bedford Street, Greenwich Village (2013 photo)

After she graduated from Vassar in 1917, Millay moved to New York City. She lived in Greenwich Village just as it was becoming known as a bohemian writers' haven. She resided in a number of places, including a house owned by the Cherry Lane Theatre and 75½ Bedford Street, renowned for being the narrowest in New York City.

While in New York City, Millay, who was bisexual, developed passing relationships with men and women. The critic Floyd Dell wrote that Millay was "a frivolous young woman, with a brand-new pair of dancing slippers and a mouth like a valentine." She maintained relationships with The Masses editor Floyd Dell and critic Edmund Wilson, both of whom proposed marriage to her and were refused. Counted among Millay's close friends were the writers Witter Bynner, Arthur Davison Ficke, and Susan Glaspell.

In 1919, she wrote the anti-war play Aria da Capo, which starred her sister Norma Millay at the Provincetown Playhouse in New York City. In 1921, Millay would write The Lamp and the Bell, her first verse drama, at the request of the drama department of Vassar. While establishing her career as a poet, Millay initially worked with the Provincetown Players on Macdougal Street and the Theatre Guild. In 1923, Millay and others founded the Cherry Lane Theatre "to continue the staging of experimental drama."

During her stay in Greenwich Village, Millay learned to use her poetry for her feminist activism. She often went into detail about topics others found taboo, such as a wife leaving her husband in the middle of the night. Millay's 1920 collection A Few Figs From Thistles drew controversy for its exploration of female sexuality and feminism. She engaged in highly successful nationwide tours in which she offered public readings of her poetry.

To support her days in the Village, Millay wrote short stories for Ainslee's Magazine. As an aesthete and a canny protector of her identity as a poet, she insisted on publishing this more mass-appeal work under the pseudonym Nancy Boyd.

== Pulitzer Prize, marriage, and purchase of Steepletop ==
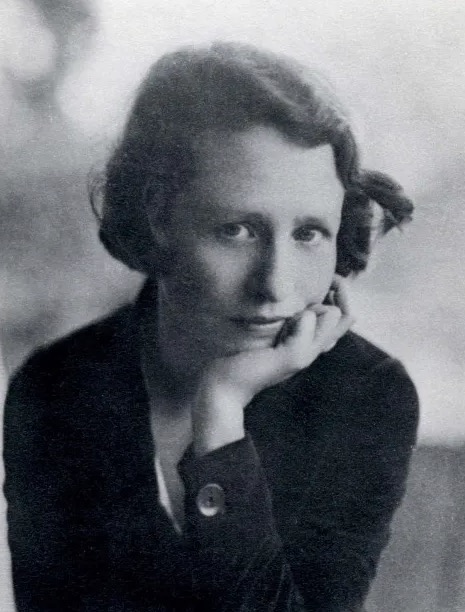
Millay, c. 1920

In January 1921, Millay traveled to Paris, where she met and befriended the sculptors Thelma Wood and Constantin Brâncuși, photographer Man Ray, had affairs with journalists George Slocombe and John Carter, and became pregnant by a man named Daubigny. She secured a marriage license but instead went to Dorset in England where her mother Cora helped induce an abortion with alkanet, as recommended in her old copy of Culpeper's Complete Herbal. Possibly as a result, Millay was frequently ill and weak for much of the next four years.

Millay won the Pulitzer Prize for Poetry in 1923 for "The Ballad of the Harp-Weaver". She was the first woman to win the poetry prize, though two women (Sara Teasdale in 1918 and Margaret Widdemer in 1919) won special prizes for their poetry prior to the establishment of the award. In 1924, literary critic Harriet Monroe labeled Millay "the greatest woman poet since Sappho."

After experiencing his remarkable attention to her during her illness, she married 43-year-old Eugen Jan Boissevain in 1923. Boissevain was the widower of labor lawyer and war correspondent Inez Milholland, a political icon Millay had met during her time at Vassar. A self-proclaimed feminist, Boissevain supported Millay's career and took primary care of domestic responsibilities. Both Millay and Boissevain had other lovers throughout their 26-year marriage. For Millay, one such significant relationship was with the poet George Dillon, a student 14 years her junior, whom she met in 1928 at one of her readings at the University of Chicago. Their relationship inspired the sonnets in the collection Fatal Interview, which she published in 1931.

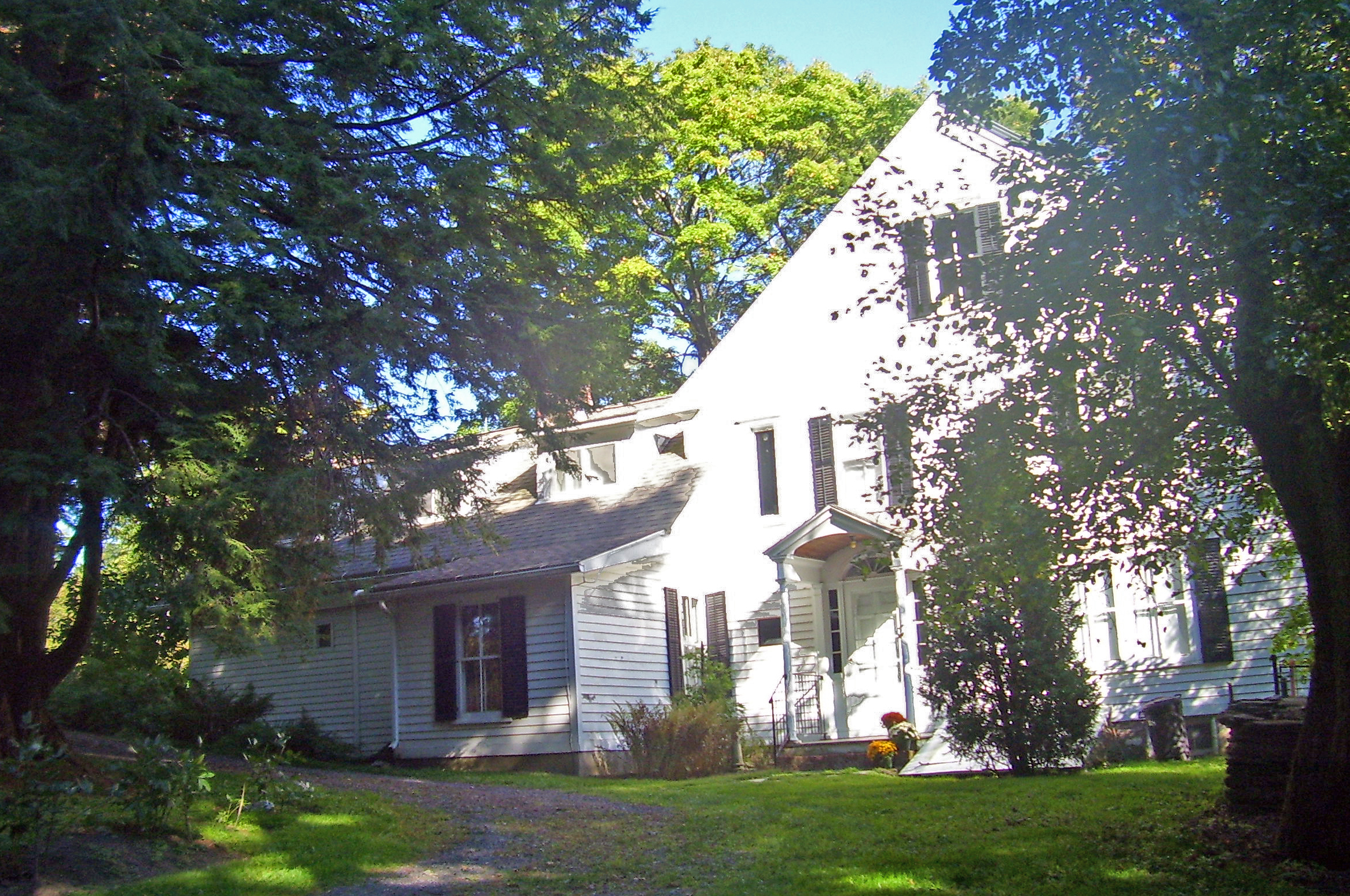
Main house at Steepletop, where Millay spent the last 25 years of her life

In 1925, Boissevain and Millay bought Steepletop near Austerlitz, New York, which had once been a 635-acre (257 ha) blueberry farm. They built a barn (from a Sears Roebuck kit), and then a writing cabin and a tennis court. Millay grew her own vegetables in a small garden. Later, they bought Ragged Island in Casco Bay, Maine, as a summer retreat. Frequently having trouble with the servants they employed, Millay wrote, "The only people I really hate are servants. They are not really human beings at all."

Millay was commissioned by the Metropolitan Opera House to write a libretto for an opera composed by Deems Taylor. The result, The King's Henchman, drew on the Anglo-Saxon Chronicle's account of Eadgar, King of Wessex. The opera began its production in 1927 to high praise; The New York Times described it as "the most effectively and artistically wrought American opera that has reached the stage."

In August 1927, Millay, along with a number of other writers, was arrested while protesting the impending executions of the Italian American anarchist duo Nicola Sacco and Bartolomeo Vanzetti. Due to her status, she was able to meet with the governor of Massachusetts, Alvan T. Fuller, to plead for a retrial. Her failure to prevent the executions would be a catalyst for her politicization in her later works, beginning with the poem "Justice Denied In Massachusetts" about the case.

== Accident and war effort ==
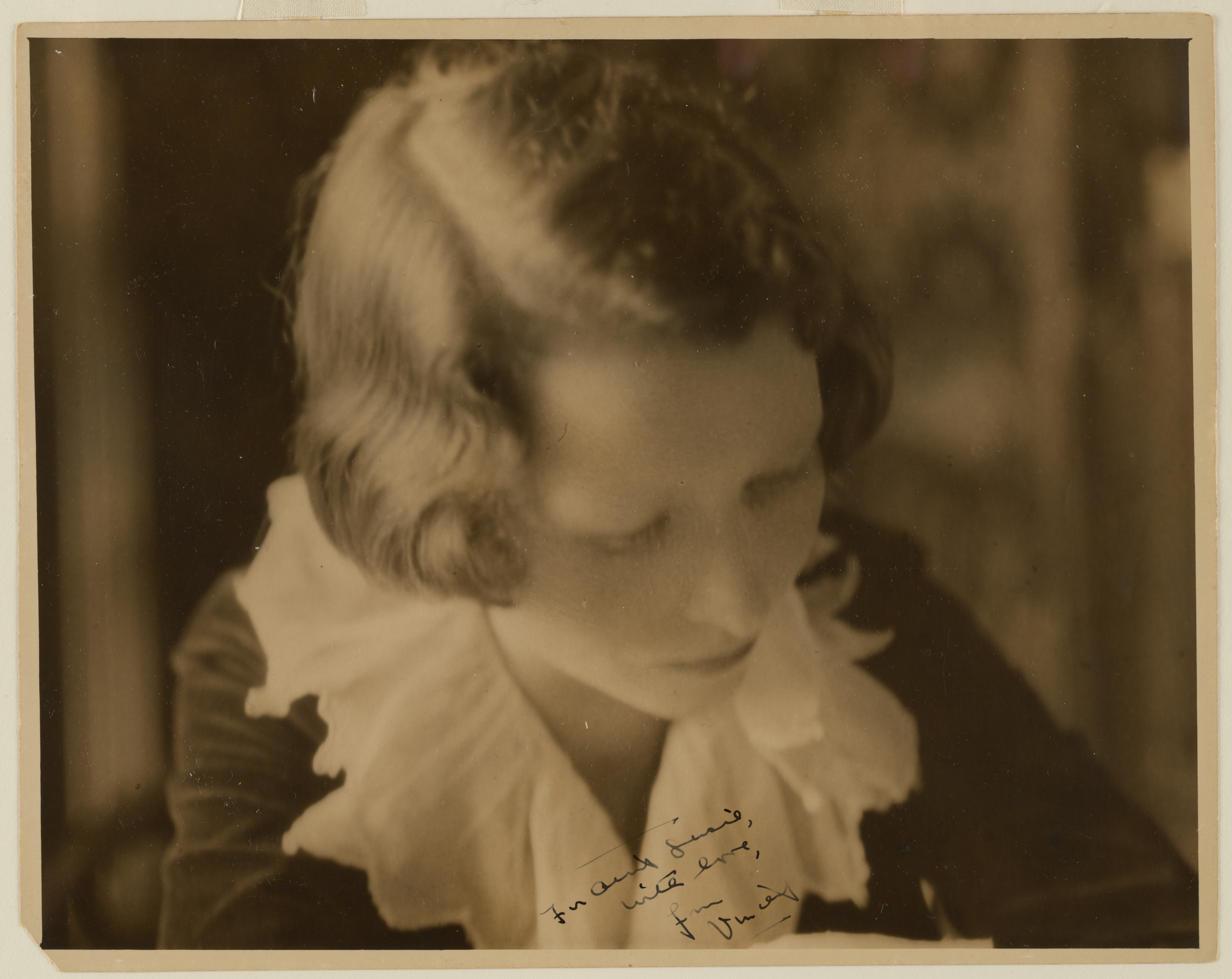
Millay in 1930

Millay was staying at the Sanibel Palms Hotel on Sanibel Island, Florida, when, on May 2, 1936, a fire started after a kerosene heater on the second floor exploded. Everything was destroyed, including the only copy of Millay's long verse poem, Conversation at Midnight, and a 1600s poetry collection written by the Roman poet Catullus of the first century BC. She would go on to rewrite Conversation at Midnight from memory and release it the following year.

In the summer of 1936, Millay was riding in a station wagon when the door suddenly swung open, and Millay "was hurled out into the pitch-darkness...and rolled for some distance down a rocky gully." The accident severely damaged nerves in her spine, requiring frequent surgeries and hospitalizations, and at least daily doses of morphine. Millay lived the rest of her life in "constant pain".

Despite her accident, Millay was sufficiently alarmed by the rise of fascism to write against it. During World War I, she had been a dedicated and active pacifist; however, in 1940, she advocated for the U.S. to enter the war against the Axis and became an ardent supporter of the war effort. She later worked with the Writers' War Board to create propaganda, including poetry. Millay's reputation in poetry circles was damaged by her war work. Merle Rubin noted, "She seems to have caught more flak from the literary critics for supporting democracy than Ezra Pound did for championing fascism."

In 1942 in The New York Times Magazine, Millay mourned the destruction of the Czech village Lidice. Nazi forces had razed Lidice, slaughtered its male inhabitants and scattered its surviving residents in retaliation for the assassination of Reinhard Heydrich. Millay wrote: "The whole world holds in its arms today / The murdered village of Lidice, / Like the murdered body of a little child." This article would serve as the basis of her 32-page work "Murder of Lidice", published by Harper and Brothers in 1942. The poem loosely served as the basis of the 1943 MGM movie Hitler's Madman.

Millay was critical of capitalism and sympathetic to socialist ideals, which she labeled as "of a free and equal society", but she did not identify as a communist. She told Grace Hamilton King in 1941 that she had been "almost a fellow-traveller with the communist idea as far as it went along with the socialist idea."

Despite the excellent sales of her books in the 1930s, her declining reputation, constant medical bills, and frequent demands from her mentally ill sister Kathleen meant that for most of her last years, Millay was in debt to her own publisher. Author Daniel Mark Epstein also concludes from her correspondence that Millay developed a passion for thoroughbred horse-racing, and spent much of her income investing in a racing stable of which she had quietly become an owner.

== Post-war and death ==
Although her work and reputation declined during the war years, possibly due to a morphine addiction she acquired following her accident, she subsequently sought treatment for it and was successfully rehabilitated. Boissevain died in 1949 of lung cancer, leaving Millay to live alone for the last year of her life. Her final collection of poems was published posthumously as the volume "Mine the Harvest". The title sonnet recalls her career:

Those hours when happy hours were my estate, —
Entailed, as proper, for the next in line,
Yet mine the harvest, and the title mine —
Those acres, fertile, and the furrows straight,
From which the lark would rise — all of my late
Enchantments, still, in brilliant colours, shine,

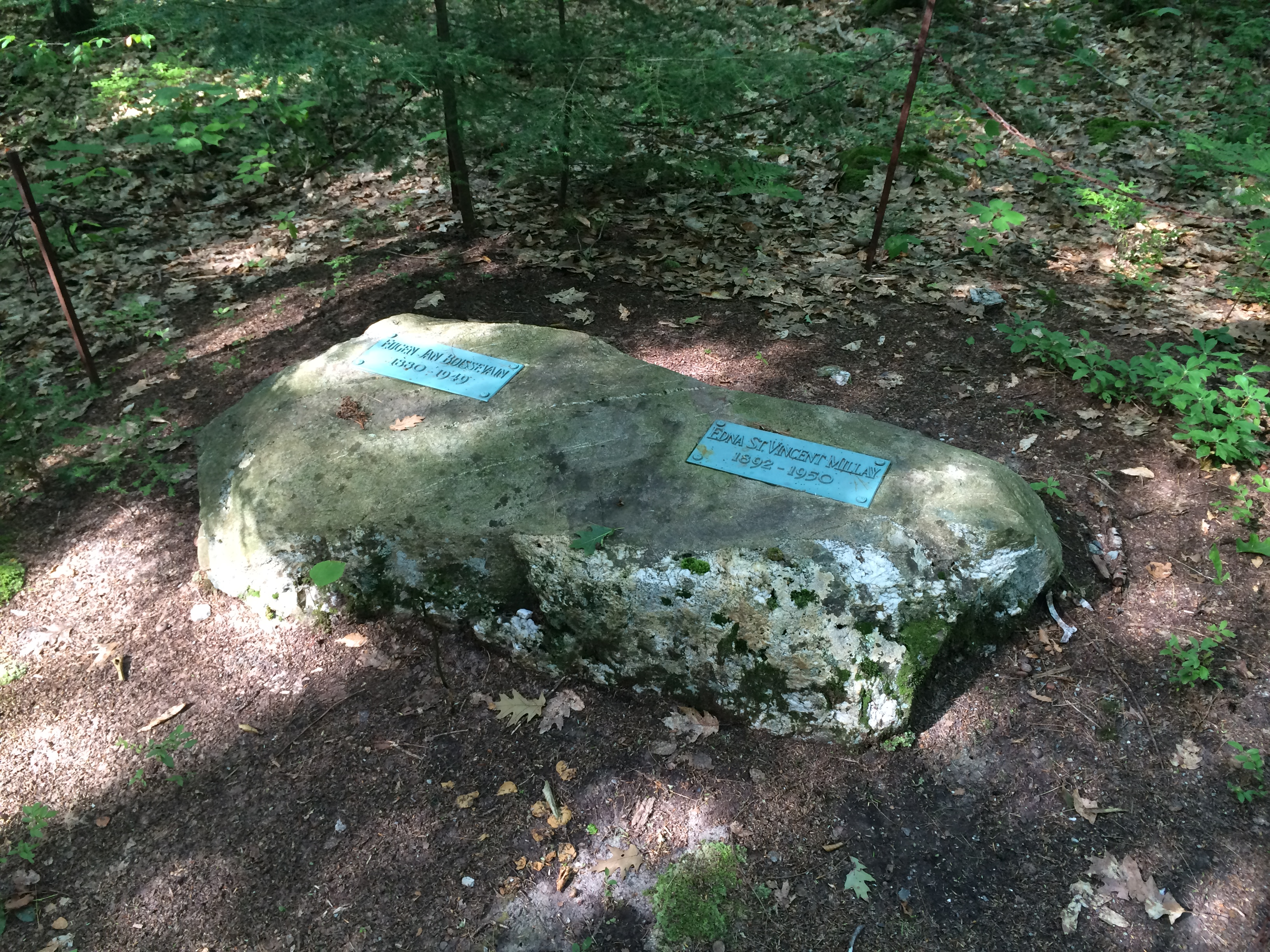
Millay and Boissevain's gravestone at Steepletop

Millay died at her home on October 19, 1950, at age 58. She had fallen down the stairs and was found with a broken neck approximately eight hours after her death. Her physician reported that she had suffered a heart attack following a coronary occlusion. She is buried alongside her husband at Steepletop, Austerlitz, New York.

== Legacy ==
After her death, The New York Times described her as "an idol of the younger generation during the glorious early days of Greenwich Village" and as "one of the greatest American poets of her time." Thomas Hardy said that America had two great attractions: the skyscraper and the poetry of Edna St. Vincent Millay. The poet Richard Wilbur asserted that Millay "wrote some of the best sonnets of the century."

Nancy Milford published a biography of the poet in 2001, Savage Beauty: The Life of Edna St Vincent Millay. Millay's sister, Norma Millay (then her only living relative), offered Milford access to the poet's papers based on her successful biography of F. Scott Fitzgerald's wife, Zelda. Milford also edited and wrote an introduction for a collection of Millay's poems called The Selected Poetry of Edna St. Vincent Millay. Milford would label Millay as "the herald of the New Woman".

A 2001 New York Times review of Milford noted that "readers of poetry probably dismiss Millay as mediocre," and noted that within 20 years of Millay's death, "the public was impatient with what had come to seem a poised, genteel emotionalism." However, it concludes that "readers should come away from Milford's book with their understanding of Millay deepened and charged." The New York Review of Books in 2002 called Milford's biography "the story of the life that eclipsed the work," and dismissed much of Millay's work as "soggy" and "doggerel".

Garrison Keillor in the introduction to his anthology Good Poems (2002) ranks Millay more highly than her contemporary Marianne Moore, and describes her as "the shining red-haired heroine of bohemian fame in the twenties, famous for her excesses and not her elegant, formal verse."

Millay was named by Equality Forum as one of their "31 Icons" of the 2015 LGBT History Month.

=== Properties, conservation, and memorials ===
Millay's sister Norma and her husband, the painter and actor Charles Frederick Ellis, moved to Steepletop after Millay's death. In 1973, they established the Millay Colony for the Arts on seven acres near the house and barn. After the death of her husband in 1976, Norma continued to run the program until her death in 1986. At 17, the poet Mary Oliver visited Steepletop and became a close friend of Norma. She would later live at Steepletop off-and-on for seven years and helped to organize Millay's papers. Mary Oliver herself went on to become a Pulitzer Prize-winning poet, greatly inspired by Millay's work. In 2006, the state of New York paid $1.69 million to acquire 230 acres (0.93 km^{2}) of Steepletop, to add the land to a nearby state forest preserve. The proceeds of the sale were used by the Edna St. Vincent Millay Society to restore the farmhouse and grounds and turn it into a museum. The museum opened to the public in the summer of 2010. Conservation of the house has been ongoing.

Conservation of Millay's birthplace began in 2015 with the purchase of the double-house at 198–200 Broadway, Rockland, Maine. Built in 1891, Henry T. and Cora B. Millay were the first tenants of the north side, where Cora gave birth to her first of three daughters during a February 1892 squall. Identified as the Singhi Double House, the home was added to the National Register of Historic Places in 2019 not as the poet's birthplace, but as a "good example" of the "modest double houses" that made up almost 10% of residences in the largely working-class city between 1837 and the early 1900s. When fully restored by 2023, half the house will be dedicated to honoring Millay's legacy with workshops and classes, while the other half will be rented for income to sustain conservation and programs. A writer-in-residence will be funded by the Ellis Beauregard Foundation and the Millay House Rockland.

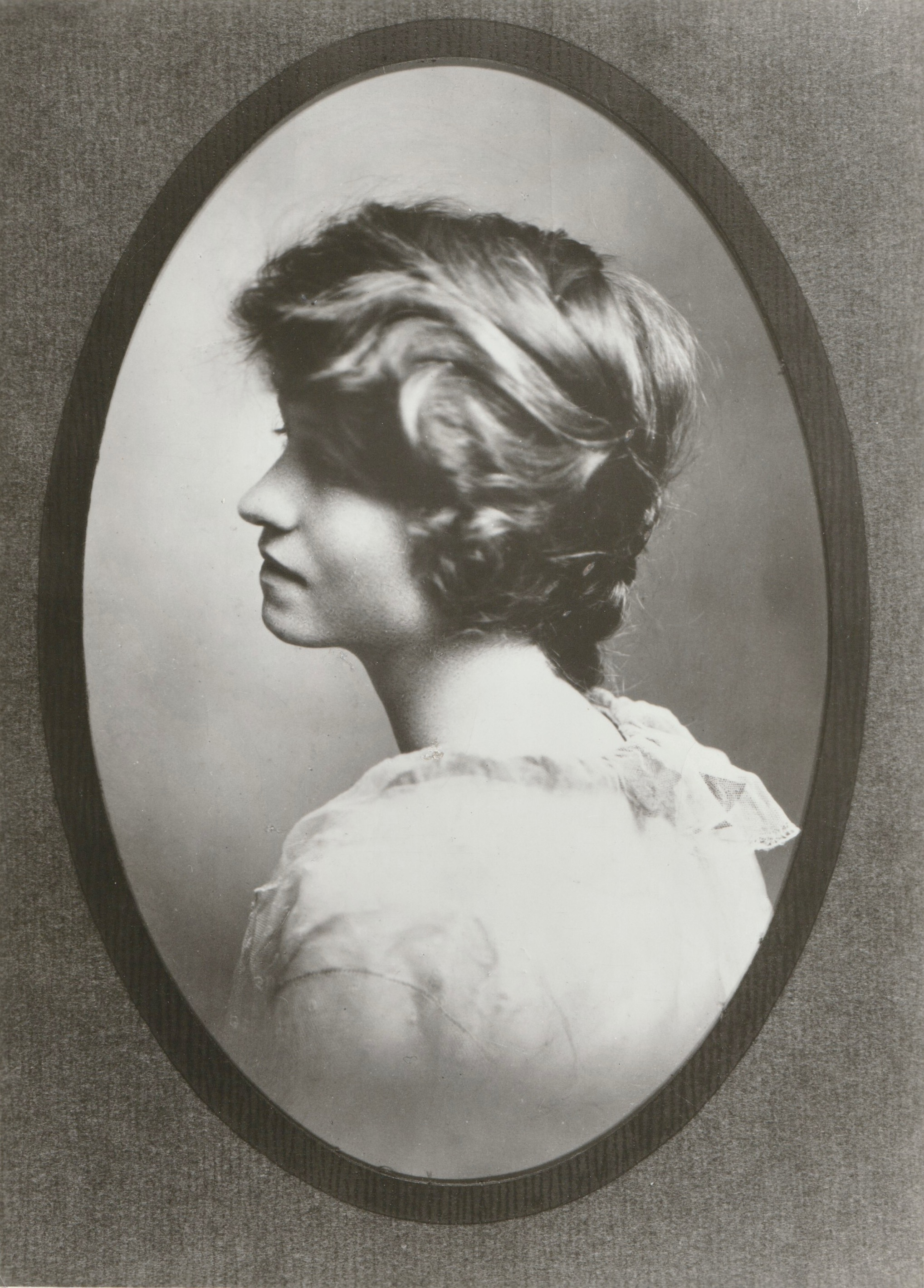
Edna St. Vincent Millay portrait (undated, likely c. 1914–1915)

Millay is also memorialized in Camden, Maine, where she lived beginning in 1900. A statue of the poet stands in Harbor Park, which shares with Mt. Battie the view of Penobscot Bay that opens "Renascence", the poem that launched Millay's career. Camden Public Library also shares Mt. Battie's view. It has the first couplets of "Renascence" inscribed along the perimeter of a large skylight: "All I could see from where I stood / Was three long mountains and a wood; / I turned and looked another way, / And saw three islands in a bay." The library's Walsh History Center collection contains the scrapbooks created by Millay's high-school friend, Corinne Sawyer, as well as photos, letters, newspaper clippings, and other ephemera.

=== In popular culture ===
Millay has been referenced in popular culture, and her work has been the inspiration for music and drama:

- In 1972, Millay's poem "Conscientious Objector" was put to music by Mary Travers (of Peter, Paul and Mary) on her album Morning Glory.
- In 1972, the song "Bird Song" appeared on Jerry Garcia's album Garcia. Lyricist Robert Hunter was inspired by a line written by Millay.
- In 1978, American composer Ivana Marburger Themmen used Millay's text for her composition Shelter This Candle from the Wind.
- In July 1981, the United States Postal Service issued an 18-cent stamp depicting Millay.
- Annette Meyers' mystery series character Olivia Brown was inspired by Millay.
- in 1986, Alice Parker published the musical suite "Songstream", with settings of nine Millay poems for chorus and two pianos.
- in the 1992, season 3, épisode 18 of Northern Exposure, the character Chris in the Morning reads an extract from Millay's poem « Renascence ».
- In the 1992 movie A River Runs Through It, Norman Maclean (played by Craig Sheffer) recites "First Fig" while on a double date with his brother at the Hot Springs speakeasy.
- In 1993, E.C. Schirmer Music published Letters from Edna, a set of eight songs set to the text of letters written by Millay to colleagues and family, by American composer Juliana Hall.
- In 1995, Ricky Ian Gordon published original sheet music to accompany the lyrics of Millay's poem "Afternoon on a Hill".
- Singer-songwriter and visual artist Deb Talan's 2000 album, Something Burning, includes a song called "The Gladdest Thing" with lyrics partially borrowed from "Afternoon on a Hill".
- In October 2020, Scottish harpist Maeve Gilchrist produced an album entitled The Harpweaver, which owes its origin to Millay's poem "The Ballad of the Harp-Weaver".
- In 2017, Laura Prepon read "Dirge Without Music" in the movie The Hero.
- In 2021, Hildegard Publishing released Six Songs on Poems of Edna St. Vincent Millay by American composer Margaret Bonds.
- In 2022, the title of her poem "What lips my lips have kissed, and where, and why", which is also its first line, was used as a plot device in the TV series Pantheon.
- In 2023, Meryl Streep recited one of her poems, "Recuerdo", in season 3 episode 5 of Only Murders in the Building, as her character Loretta Durkin.
- In 2025, in the 9th episode of the 2nd season of the TV series Poker Face, Millay's poem "Dirge Without Music" is quoted.

My candle burns at both ends;
It will not last the night;
But ah, my foes, and oh, my friends—
It gives a lovely light!

— "First Fig"
from A Few Figs from Thistles (1920)

== See also ==
- 75½ Bedford Street — Millay's residence in New York City from 1923 to 1924
- Boissevain family — relatives of Millay's husband, Eugen Jan Boissevain
- Greenwich Village — Millay's neighborhood from 1917 to 1921, 1923 to 1924
- Inez Milholland — first wife of Eugen Jan Boissevain and fellow Vassar alumna
- List of English-language poets
- List of poets portraying sexual relations between women
- Modernist poetry
- Nancy Milford — biographer of Millay
- Norma Millay — sister of Edna St. Vincent Millay
- Vassar College — Millay's alma mater
