= Austerlitz, New York =

- Town
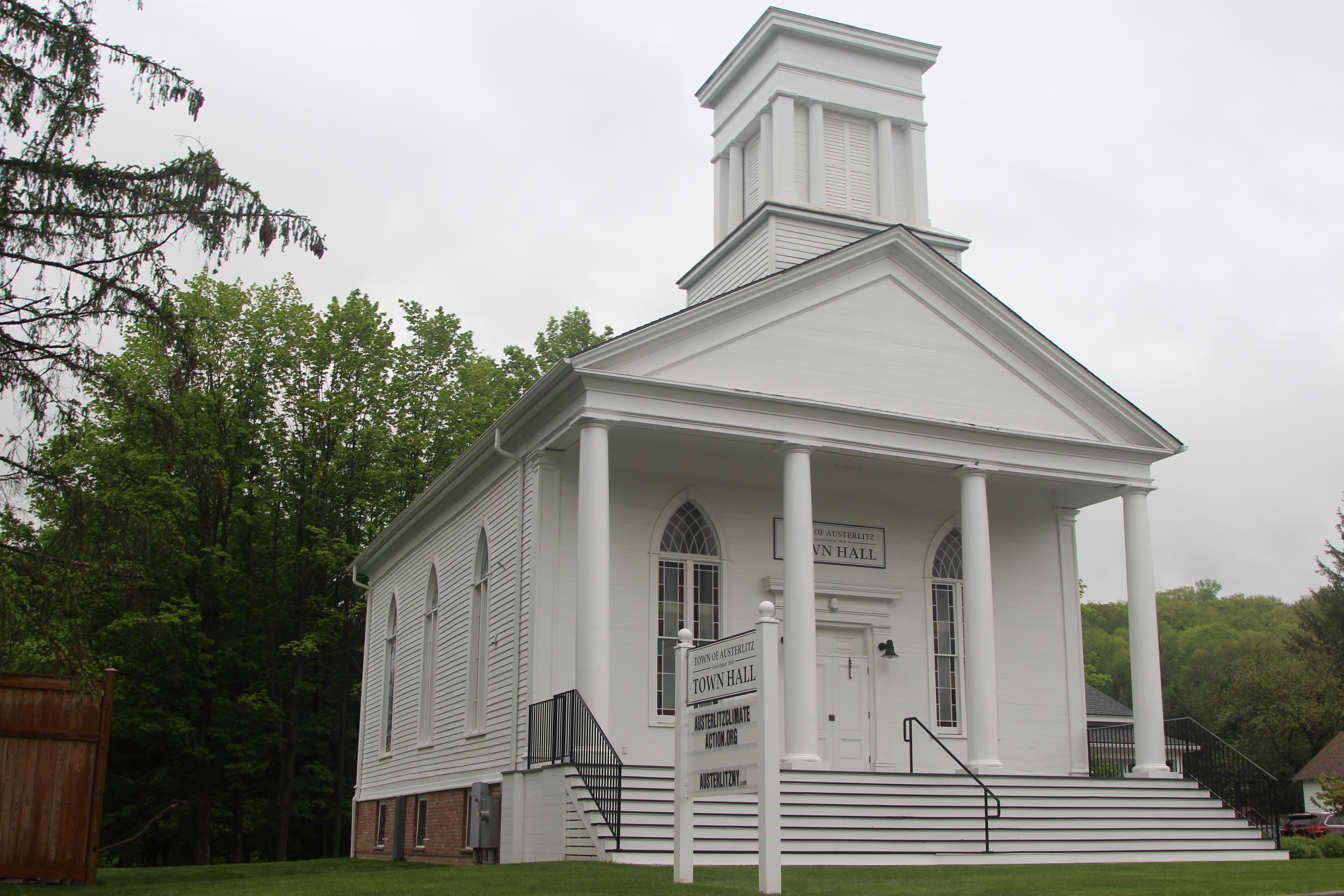
- Town hall, along NY 203 in Spencertown

- Location of Austerlitz, New York
- Coordinates: 42°19′13″N 73°31′16″W
- Country: United States
- State: New York
- County: Columbia
- Named after: Battle of Austerlitz

Government
  - Type: Town Council
  - Town Supervisor: Jeff Braley (R)
  - Town Council: Members' List: • Jon Mesick (R); • Bryan Geel (R); • Carol Pinto (R); • Matt Verenazi (R)

Area
  - Total: 48.81 sq mi (126.43 km^{2})
  - Land: 48.72 sq mi (126.19 km^{2})
  - Water: 0.093 sq mi (0.24 km^{2})
- Elevation: 1,175 ft (358 m)

Population (2020)
  - Total: 1,625
  - Density: 33.35/sq mi (12.88/km^{2})
- Time zone: UTC-5 (Eastern (EST))
  - Summer (DST): UTC-4 (EDT)
- ZIP Codes: 12017 (Austerlitz); 12165 (Spencertown); 12037 (Chatham); 12075 (Ghent); 12529 (Hillsdale)
- Area code: 518
- FIPS code: 36-021-03287
- GNIS feature ID: 0978700
- Website: www.austerlitzny.gov

Austerlitz is a town in Columbia County, New York, United States. The population was 1,625 at the 2020 census. The town was named after the Battle of Austerlitz.

The town is in the eastern part of Columbia County.

== History ==
Ellis, Capt. Franklin, "History of Columbia County, New York", (1878), page 381:

The town was organized from parts of the towns of Hillsdale, Chatham, and Canaan, March 28, 1818. A little more than one-fifteenth of the present town was taken from Chatham, a little over one-eighth from Canaan, and a little less than five-sixths from Hillsdale. From the fact that among the first settlers there were no less than twelve families of Spencers, the north part of Hillsdale had been known from the first as "Spencer's-town." This name finally attached itself simply to the village, and when the division of the town was being talked up it was proposed to call the new town "New Ulm." When the bill erecting it passed the Legislature, however, Martin Van Buren, then a State Senator, and who, being an ardent admirer of the great Napoleon, was somewhat incensed at one of his political opponents (Elisha Williams, if we mistake not), who had succeeded in having a town in Seneca County christened "Waterloo," leaped to his feet and moved to amend by calling the new town "Austerlitz." Having carried his point, he retired to his seat, saying "There's an Austerlitz for your Waterloo."

=== Past residents of note ===
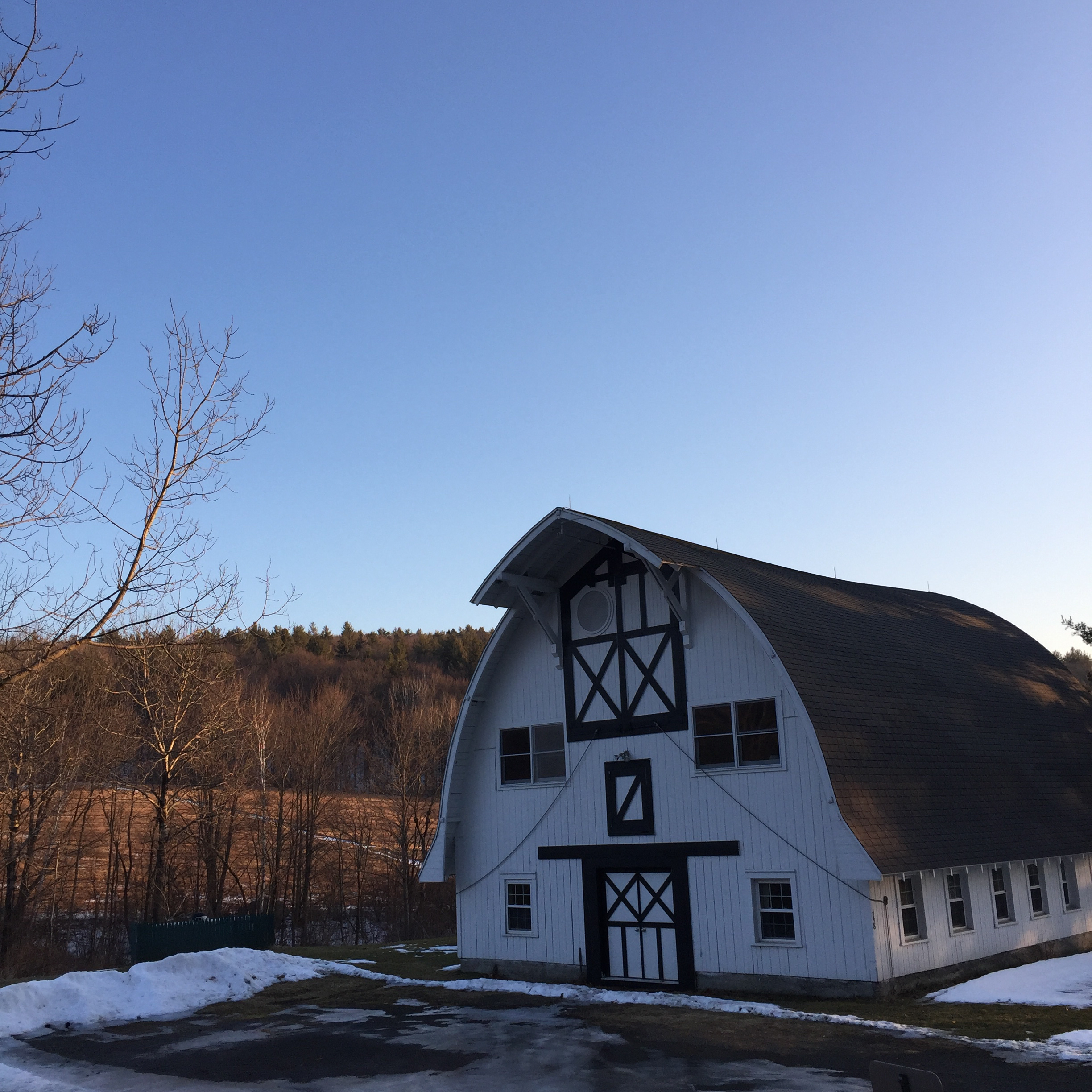
Millay Arts barn built from a Sears Roebuck kit in 1926

Edna St. Vincent Millay, Pulitzer-prize winning poet, lived at Steepletop, a more than 800-acre (3.2 km^{2}) property that had previously been a farm. Her sister, Norma, inherited the property at Millay's death in 1950. Norma and her husband, Charles Ellis, in 1973 founded a non-profit artist residency program, the Millay Arts (formerly the Millay Colony for the Arts), and deeded a small portion of the land to the organization. In 1978, Norma created the non-profit Edna St. Vincent Millay Society that now oversees the house and remainder of the property. Tours are available.

Steepletop was listed on the National Register of Historic Places in 1971.

== Geography ==
According to the United States Census Bureau, the town has a total area of 48.8 square miles (126.4 km^{2}), of which 48.7 square miles (126.2 km^{2}) is land and 0.08 square miles (0.2 km^{2}), or 0.19%, is water. The western half of the town drains via tributaries of Kinderhook Creek and Claverack Creek westward to the Hudson River, while the eastern half primarily drains via the Green River southeast into Massachusetts, where it joins the Housatonic River flowing south into Connecticut.

The eastern town line is the border of Massachusetts.

The Taconic State Parkway passes through the far western side of the town.

== Demographics ==
Historical population
Census	Pop.	Note	%±
1820	2,355		—
1830	2,245		−4.7%
1840	2,091		−6.9%
1850	1,873		−10.4%
1860	1,889		0.9%
1870	1,442		−23.7%
1880	1,341		−7.0%
1890	1,142		−14.8%
1900	974		−14.7%
1910	811		−16.7%
1920	666		−17.9%
1930	643		−3.5%
1940	626		−2.6%
1950	753		20.3%
1960	809		7.4%
1970	905		11.9%
1980	1,314		45.2%
1990	1,456		10.8%
2000	1,453		−0.2%
2010	1,654		13.8%
2020	1,625		−1.8%
U.S. Decennial Census 2020

As of the census of 2000, there were 1,453 people, 620 households, and 427 families residing in the town. The population density was 29.8 inhabitants per square mile (11.5/km^{2}). There were 906 housing units at an average density of 18.6 per square mile (7.2/km^{2}). The racial makeup of the town was 97.45% White, 0.83% African American, 0.07% Native American, 0.55% Asian, 0.76% from other races, and 0.34% from two or more races. Hispanic or Latino of any race were 0.83% of the population.

There were 620 households, out of which 25.6% had children under the age of 18 living with them, 59.0% were married couples living together, 6.9% had a female householder with no husband present, and 31.1% were non-families. 24.2% of all households were made up of individuals, and 8.5% had someone living alone who was 65 years of age or older. The average household size was 2.34 and the average family size was 2.81.

In the town, the population was spread out, with 20.4% under the age of 18, 4.4% from 18 to 24, 23.7% from 25 to 44, 34.0% from 45 to 64, and 17.5% who were 65 years of age or older. The median age was 46 years. For every 100 females, there were 104.6 males. For every 100 females age 18 and over, there were 101.2 males.

The median income for a household in the town was $51,369, and the median income for a family was $56,771. Males had a median income of $44,531 versus $37,188 for females. The per capita income for the town was $38,054. About 4.7% of families and 5.6% of the population were below the poverty line, including 7.2% of those under age 18 and 0.8% of those age 65 or over.

== Communities and locations in Austerlitz ==
- Austerlitz – The hamlet of Austerlitz is located east of the geographic center of the town at the junction of routes 22 and 203.
- Morehouse Corner – A hamlet in the northwestern corner of the town on Route 203.
- Red Rock – A hamlet at the northern town line.
- Spencertown – A hamlet in the western part of the town on Route 203.
