= Bruce Davidson (photographer) =

American photographer

Bruce L. Davidson
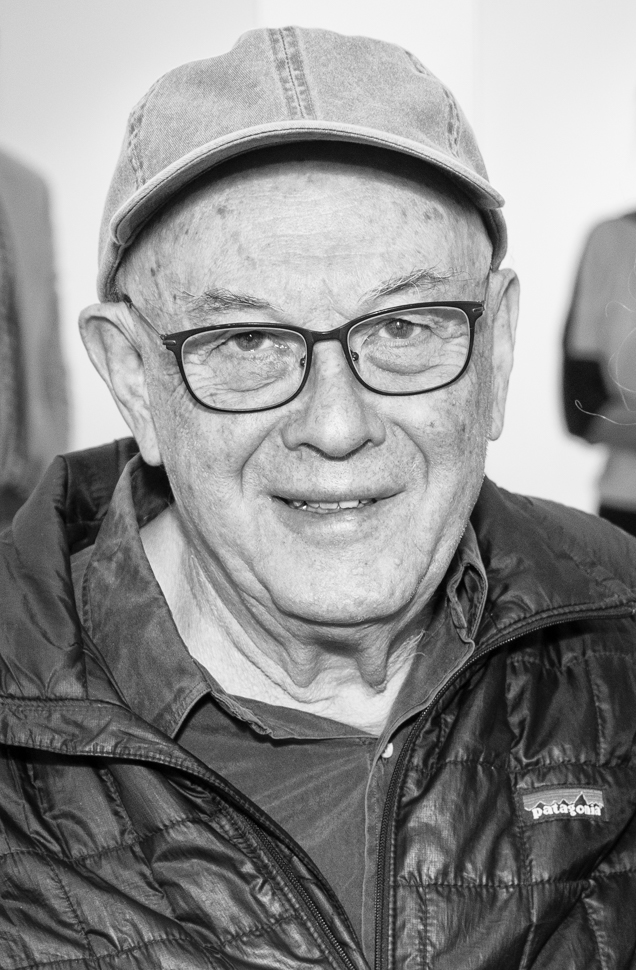
- Davidson in 2015
- Born: Bruce Landon Davidson; September 5, 1933 (age 93); Oak Park, Illinois, U.S.
- Occupation: Photographer
- Notable work: Brooklyn Gang, The Dwarf, East 100th Street, Subway
- Spouse: Emily Haas (m. 1967; died 2023)

Bruce Landon Davidson (born September 5, 1933) is an American photographer, who has been a member of the Magnum Photos agency since 1958. His photographs, notably those taken in Harlem, New York City, have been widely exhibited and published. He is known for photographing communities that are usually hostile to outsiders.

== Biography ==
=== Early life and education ===
Davidson was born on September 5, 1933, in Oak Park, a suburb of Chicago, to a Jewish family of Polish origins. When he was 10, his mother built him a darkroom in their basement and he began taking photographs. When he was fifteen, his mother remarried to a lieutenant commander in the navy who was given a Kodak rangefinder camera, which Davidson was allowed to use before being given a more advanced camera for his bar mitzvah. He was employed at Austin Camera as a stock boy and was approached by local news photographer Al Cox, who taught him the technical nuances of photography, in addition to lighting and printing skills, including dye transfer colour. His artistic influences included Robert Frank, Eugene Smith, and Henri Cartier-Bresson.

At 19, Davidson won his first national recognition for his photography, the 1952 Kodak National High School Photographic Award, for a picture of an owl. From 1951, Davidson attended the Rochester Institute of Technology where he used a second-hand Contax to photograph at Lighthouse Mission as he studied under Ralph Hattersley, and in 1955, continued his graduate studies at Yale University, studying philosophy, painting, and photography under graphic designer Herbert Matter, photographer and designer Alexey Brodovitch, and artist Josef Albers. Davidson showed Albers a box of prints of alcoholics on Skid Row; Albers told him to throw out his "sentimental" work and join his class in drawing and color. For his college thesis, Davidson created a photo-essay, ‘‘Tension in the Dressing Room,’’ his first to be published in Life, documenting the emotions of Yale football players behind the scenes of the game.

=== Military photographer ===
After one semester at Yale, Davidson was drafted into the US Army, where he served in the Signal Corps at Fort Huachuca, Arizona, attached to the post's photo pool. Initially, he was given routine photo assignments. An editor of the post's newspaper, recognizing his talents, asked that he be permanently assigned to the newspaper. There, given a certain degree of autonomy, he was allowed to further hone his talents.

The Army posted Davidson to Supreme Headquarters Allied Powers in Europe, just outside Paris; and, in bohemian Montmartre, he photographed the widow of the impressionist painter Leon Fauché with her husband's paintings in an archetypal garret. She was old enough to have known Toulouse-Lautrec, Renoir and Gauguin. Davidson's resulting photo-essay, Widow of Montmartre, was published in Esquire in 1958. The series impressed Henri Cartier-Bresson, who became a personal friend and facilitated Davidson's induction into Magnum Photos.

=== Magnum Photos ===
After his military service, in 1957, Davidson worked briefly as a freelance photographer.

In 1958, he became an associate member of the Magnum Photos agency and a full member a year later. During the summer of 1959 and coincidentally only two years after the premiere of West Side Story, through a social worker he made contact with homeless, troubled teenagers who called themselves the Jokers, and after photographing them over 11 months produced Brooklyn Gang. Their leader was also the subject of extensive interviews by Davidson's wife-to-be Emily Haas (they married in 1967), later published with his photographs.

When in 1960 Queen magazine invited him to Britain for two months, he documented the idiosyncratic stoicism of the natives of the islands from an American perspective.

Through the agency in 1961 he received his first assignment to photograph high fashion for Vogue, and was assigned by The New York Times to cover the Freedom Riders in the South. The Freedom Riders assignment in the South led Davidson to undertake a documentary project on the civil rights movement. From 1961 to 1965, he chronicled its events and effects around the country. A number were shown in the 1965 Smithsonian Institution exhibition project Profile of Poverty, produced by the Office of Economic Opportunity (OEO) in support of the antipoverty programs of the 1960s. President Johnson assembled the 'White House Photography Program,' headed by MoMA's John Szarkowski, through which Davidson's project was used to humanise the poor and demonstrate the urgency of government action. In support of the project, Davidson received a Guggenheim Fellowship in 1961, and the project was displayed in 1963 at the Museum of Modern Art in New York; and curator John Szarkowski included pictures from the project in a 1966 solo exhibition, and they were also included in The Negro American, a 1966 collection of essays on the status of African-Americans. Upon the completion of his documentation of the civil rights movement, Davidson received the first ever photography grant from the National Endowment for the Arts of $12,000.

In 1964, Davidson became an instructor at the School of Visual Arts, New York (thereafter giving private workshops in his own studio/darkroom), and continued to produce features for Vogue; Philip Johnson in his glass house, Andy Warhol in his loft, Cristina Ford in her backyard, and offered a photography workshop from his Greenwich Village studio. He produced a story on a “topless” restaurant in San Francisco for Esquire (1965), then later in the year traveled to Wales for a Holiday magazine assignment to photograph castles and also covered the coal mining industry in South Wales. On his honeymoon in 1967, Davidson photographed the James Duffy and Sons Circus in Ireland, for the series Circus.

Davidson's next project, published in 1970 as East 100th Street—a two-year documentation of a conspicuously poverty-stricken block in East Harlem—is a widely referenced work. Its series of Environmental portraits was shot on large format film with a view camera. Vicki Goldberg and Milton Kramer identify it as the first work of photojournalism to be presented as an art book. The project was also displayed at the Museum of Modern Art in 1970 and subjects of the two-year Harlem project were invited to the opening of the show after Davidson had already presented two thousand prints to people on the block.

Davidson followed this with Subway, a portrayal of passengers on the New York City Subway system, 1980–82 using color.

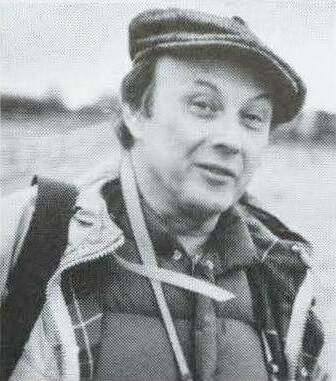
Davidson circa 1986

Over a decade later, in the early 1990s, Davidson completed a four-year exploration of Central Park in homage to New York City.

In 1998, Davidson returned to East 100th Street to document the revitalization, renewal and changes that occurred in the 30 years since he last documented it. For this visit, he presented a community slide show and received an Open Society Institute Individual Fellowship Award.

=== Filmmaker ===
Davidson took stills for Michelangelo Antonioni's Zabriskie Point, as he also did on The Misfits, amongst Inge Morath, Henri Cartier-Bresson, Dennis Stock, Eve Arnold, Ernst Haas, Cornell Capa, Elliott Erwitt, and Erich Hartmann. But he also produced motion pictures himself. In 1968 he purchased a 16mm movie camera to film on East 100th Street.

Davidson directed short films; the documentaries Living off the Land (1986) (Note: Living off the Land (1986) Television documentary featuring Willy Royka and Emily Royka, Director: Bruce Davidson, Time-Life Broadcasting, Acacia Productions, Otmoor Productions, Producer J. Edward Milner, Series Editor: John Edginton, Associate Producer: Nikki Nagasiri) on conservation in the United Kingdom made with a grant from the American Film Institute and awarded the Critics Choice Award, and Zoo Doctor (1971) for children. With another grant from the American Film Institute he produced a 28-minute dramatisation Isaac Singer’s Nightmare and Mrs. Pupko’s Beard (1972) which appeared on Public Television and won first prize in its class in the 1972 American Film Festival.

=== Later career ===
Davidson continued to work as an editorial photographer, and contributed to the Center for Photography at Woodstock workshops and lectures.

An image from his Brooklyn Gang series was used as the cover for Bob Dylan's 2009 album Together Through Life.

From 2015, Davidson had started to review his archive, and was finding imagery that had been previously unseen. By 2023 he was in his 90th year and had assembled The Way Back, an exhibition at the Howard Greenberg Gallery, New York, 23 June–16 September 2023, and a book of that title was published in 2025.

== Critical reception ==
In a 1966 Museum of Modern Art press release, John Szarkowski, then Director of the Museum's Department of Photography, wrote;

"Few contemporary photographers give us their observation so unembellished — so free of apparent craft or artifice — as does Bruce Davidson. In his work, formal and technical concerns remain below the surface, all but invisible. The presence that fills these pictures seems the presence of the life that is described, scarcely changed by its transmutation into art."

— John Szarkowski, Museum of Modern Art Press Release, July 7, 1966

His photograph from the Brooklyn Gang series of a couple preening in front of a mirrored cigarette machine at Coney Island is on the cover of Reading Magnum: A visual archive of the modern world, in which Steven Hoelscher rates the image as 'iconic'. On a formal level, Richard D. Zakia notes Davidson's aesthetic use of 'found' symbolism in his environmental portraits, referring in particular to the cover image of his book East 100th Street.

Davidson's extended involvement with his subjects, and their reciprocal trust, is regarded as an exemplar in photography of the "New Journalism" based in authentic documentary content mediated through a subjective, personal perspective and characterised by representations of those who are not part of mainstream culture. For Laura Hapke he is an inheritor of a radical heritage in American working-class studies extending from Ben Shahn.

Gary Sampson of the Cleveland Institute of Art lists Davidson alongside Danny Lyon and Diane Arbus as photographers who reacted to Robert Frank’s European perspective in The Americans with a ‘hip’ ‘insider’ investigation of U.S. subcultures pervaded by a sombre angst. He points to Nathan Lyons' characterisation of this trend as ‘social landscape’ in Lyon's curation of the 1966 George Eastman House Toward a Social Landscape. The term "social landscape" was coined in 1963 by Lee Friedlander to describe his photographs, and was subsequently attached to the work of Davidson, Lyon, Garry Winogrand, Diane Arbus, and Duane Michals; a hybrid term, it refers to a fusion of traditional documentary and landscape photography in which subject and environment are inseparable, and which calls attention to apparently inconsequential events and details so that object and setting modify each other to generate metaphor.

Howard S. Becker in 1974 was among the first contemporary sociologists to argue for a 'visual sociology' and connected it to the traditions of documentary photography, suggesting that sociology could draw upon documentary photography, identifying the earliest and most important as Robert Frank's essay on US culture, followed by Bruce Davidson's 1970 study of Harlem.

In contrast, Ian Jeffrey, in comparing Davidson with his contemporary (and friend) Diane Arbus, disputes any evident anthropological purpose for East 100th Street, instead seeing its subjects as survivors inhabiting “a darkness articulated by architectural details” and his portraits relying, like Arbus's, on "atmosphere rather than an analysis". Though they live in an oppressive environment, he writes, they "demand to be taken seriously", while Arbus represents "figments of her imagination"; her subjects "actors in a social drama."

However, also regarding East 100th Street, Douglas Harper goes as far as to accuse Davidson of "prettying up racial poverty"; while critic A. D. Coleman decries the absence of minority photographers to document it themselves. This is an issue elaborated by Erina Duganne's analyses of Davidson's, Roy DeCarava's and the Kamoinge Workshop's "Harlem" imagery, showing how poverty may be identified with ethnicity, and how photographers' cultural identity is revealed through their photographs. Coleman points to the pains taken by Davidson to avoid accusations of exploiting a repressed subculture, though stresses that he does so because of the charged politics of a white man, neither black nor Puerto Rican, "not only an outsider but an alien", photographing in the ghetto. If "Davidson has transmuted a truth which is not beautiful into an art", making a striking composition of a rat on a garbage dump, writes Coleman, the garbage may "continue to stink and decompose, and may even endure longer than Davidson's superb prints." In interview with Charlotte Cotton, Davidson answers the criticism;

I didn't have to be black or Puerto Rican to take photographs on East 100th Street, I just had to stay there long enough for people to understand what I was about. And I still, to some extent, have a relationship with those people.

— Bruce Davidson, Aperture, No. 220, The Interview Issue (Fall 2015), pp. 94–107.

== Awards ==
- 1949 First Prize, Kodak National High School Competition, Animal Division
- 1961 John Simon Guggenheim Memorial Foundation Fellowship
- 1967 National Endowment for the Arts Grant for Photography
- 1963 Critics' Award, American Film Festival (Living Off the Land)
- 1973 First Prize in Fiction, American Film Festival (Isaac Singer's Nightmare and Mrs. Pupko's Beard)
- 1982 National Endowment for the Arts Grant
- 1998 Open Society Institute, Individual Fellowship
- 2004 Lucie Award, Outstanding Achievement in Documentary Photography
- 2007 Gold Medal Visual Arts Award, National Arts Club
- 2011 Outstanding Contribution to Photography Award at the 2011 Sony World Photography Awards
- 2018 Infinity Award Life Time Achievement, the International Center of Photography
- 2021 Royal Photographic Society Centenary Medal and Honorary Fellowship

== Publications ==
- East 100th Street.
  - Cambridge, MA: Harvard University Press, 1970. Hardback ISBN 978-0-674-22435-3; softback ISBN 978-0-674-22436-0.
  - Los Angeles: St Ann's Press, 2003. ISBN 978-0-9713681-3-2. Expanded edition.
- Bruce Davidson Photographs. Agrinde/Summit, 1978. Paperback ISBN 978-0-671-40068-2.
- Subway.
  - New York: Aperture, 1986. ISBN 978-0-89381-231-7.
  - Los Angeles: St Ann's Press, 2003. ISBN 978-0-9713681-8-7. Expanded edition.
  - Göttingen: Steidl, 2011. ISBN 978-3-86930-294-2. With texts by Fred Braithwaite, "Bruce Davidson's Subway"; Davidson, "Train of Thought"; and Henry Geldzahler, "Reflections".
- Portraits. New York: Aperture, 1991. Hardback ISBN 978-0-89381-851-7.
- Central Park. Aperture, 1995; 2004; 2005. ISBN 978-0-89381-625-4.
- Brooklyn Gang: Summer 1959. Santa Fe, NM: Twin Palms, 1998. ISBN 978-0-944092-50-7.
- Isaac Bashevis Singer and the Lower East Side: Photographs by Bruce Davidson. Amhurst, MA: Mead Art Museum; Madison: University of Wisconsin Press, 2004. ISBN 978-0-299-20620-8 (paperback); ISBN 978-0-299-20624-6 (paperback).
- England/Scotland 1960. Göttingen: Steidl, 2006. ISBN 978-3-86521-127-9.
  - Göttingen: Steidl, 2013. ISBN 978-3-86930-553-0. Enlarged edition.
- Outside Inside. Göttingen: Steidl, 2010. ISBN 978-3-86521-908-4. A three-volume collection containing black and white photographs that spanned his career to date.
- Black and White. Göttingen: Steidl, 2012. ISBN 978-3-86930-432-8. A five-volume set comprising reprints of Circus (1958), Brooklyn Gang (1959), Time of Change (1961–1965), East 100th Street (1966–1968), and Central Park (1992–1995), some of them newly edited and expanded.
- In Color. Göttingen: Steidl, 2014. ISBN 978-3-86930-564-6.
- Los Angeles 1964. Göttingen: Steidl, 2015. ISBN 978-3-86930-789-3.
- Nature of Los Angeles. Göttingen: Steidl, 2015. ISBN 978-3-86930-814-2.
- Survey. New York: Aperture; Madrid: Fundación Mapfre, 2016. ISBN 978-1-59711-377-9. With texts by Charlotte Cotton, Carlos Gollonet, Frits Gierstberg, and Francesco Zanot. Exhibition catalogue. Contains work from Brooklyn Gang, Subway, Central Park, East 100th Street and more recent Paris and Los Angeles landscapes.
- Lesser Known. Göttingen: Steidl, 2017. ISBN 978-3-95829-321-2.
- The Way Back. Göttingen: Steidl, 2025. ISBN 978-3-96999-231-9.

== Exhibitions ==
Davidson's work was featured in, or was the subject of, fourteen exhibitions over fifty years at the Museum of Modern Art in New York: Photographs from the Museum Collection, November 26, 1958 – January 18, 1959; Photographs for Collectors, October 1–16, 1960; Recent Acquisitions, December 21, 1960 – February 5, 1961; Art in a Changing World: 1884–1964: Edward Steichen Photography Center, May 27, 1964; The Photo Essay, March 16 – May 16, 1965; Bruce Davidson July 7 – October 2, 1966; Steichen Gallery Reinstallation, October 25, 1967; Portrait Photographs, July 9 – September 28, 1969; East 100th Street: Photographs by Bruce Davidson, September 22 – November 29, 1970; Mirrors and Windows: American Photography since 1960, July 26 – October 2, 1978; Edward Steichen Photography Center Reinstallation, December 21, 1979; Reinstallation of the Collection, October 23, 1980 – January 3, 1982; New York at Night: Photographs from the Collection, December 12, 2006 – March 5, 2007; Counter Space: Design and the Modern Kitchen, September 15, 2010 – May 2, 2011.

=== Solo exhibitions ===
- 1965 Art Institute of Chicago, Chicago
- 1965 International Museum of Photography, George Eastman House, Rochester, New York
- 1965 San Francisco Museum of Modern Art, San Francisco
- 1966 Museum of Modern Art, New York City
- 1966 Moderna Museet, Stockholm
- 1970 East 100th Street: Photographs by Bruce Davidson; Museum of Modern Art, New York City
- 1971 San Francisco Museum of Modern Art, San Francisco
- 1976 Addison Gallery, Andover, Massachusetts
- 1979 FNAC Gallery, Paris
- 1979 Galerie Delpire, Paris
- 1979 Galerie Fiolet, Amsterdam
- 1982 Douglas Kenyon Gallery, Chicago
- 1983 New York Subway Color; International Center of Photography, New York City
- 1997 Bruce Davidson: American Photographs; Edwynn Houk Gallery, New York City
- 1998 Bruce Davidson: The Brooklyn Gang, 1959; International Center of Photography, New York City
- 2007 Bruce Davidson: Time of Change. Aperture Gallery, New York City
- 2007 Bruce Davidson: La Nature de Paris, Maison européenne de la photographie, Paris, June 13, 2007 – Sept 30, 2007
- 2017 Bruce Davidson WestLicht. Schauplatz für Fotografie, Vienna, June 15 – August 20
- 2017/18 Bruce Davidson: American Photographer Netherlands Photo Museum, Rotterdam, Sep 16, 2017 – Jan 7 2018
- 2018/19 Bruce Davidson: Leica Hall of Fame 2018, Leica Galerie Milano, Nov 13, 2018 – Jan 26, 2019
- 2023 Bruce Davidson: Subway, San Diego Museum of Art, June 3–Dec 3, 2023

=== Group exhibitions ===
- 1959 Photography at Mid Century; George Eastman House, Rochester, New York
- 1960 The World as Seen by Magnum; Takashimaya Department Store, Tokyo, Japan and traveling
- 1962 Ideas in Images; American Federation of Arts, New York, New York, and traveling
- 1966 Contemporary Photography Since 1950; George Eastman House, Rochester, New York
- 1966 Toward a Social Landscape: Contemporary Photographers; George Eastman House, Rochester, New York
- 1967 12 Photographers of the American Social Landscape; Rose Art Museum, Brandeis University, Boston, Massachusetts
- 1973 The Concerned Photographer 2; Israel Museum, Jerusalem and traveling
- 1974 Photography in America; Whitney Museum of American Art, New York, New York
- 1977 Concerning Photography; The Photographers’ Gallery, London, then Spectro Workshop, Newcastle upon Tyne, England.
- 1980 The Imaginary Photo Museum; Kunsthalle, Cologne, Germany
- 1982 Color as Form: a history of color photography; International Museum of Photography, George Eastman House, Rochester, New York
- 1985 American Images 1945–1950; Barbican Art Gallery, London, and traveling
- 1986 New York School, Photographs, 1935–1963, Part III; Corcoran Gallery of Art, Washington, D.C.
- 1989 On the Art of Fixing a Shadow: One Hundred and Fifty Years of Photography; National Gallery of Art, Washington, D.C., and Art Institute of Chicago, Chicago, Illinois (traveled to Los Angeles County Museum of Art, Los Angeles, California)
- 1991 Appearances: Fashion Photography Since 1945; Victoria and Albert Museum, London
- 2000 Reflections in a Glass Eye: Works from the International Center of Photography Collection; International Center of Photography, New York, New York
- 2012/13 Everything Was Moving: Photography from the 60s and 70s, Barbican Centre, London, 13 Sep 2012 – 13 Jan 2013
- 2014/15 Au Cœur de l'Intime: Paris Champ & Hors Champ Photographies et Vidéos Contemporaines, Galerie des Bibliothèques de la Ville de Paris, Oct 26, 2014 - Jan 4, 2015
- 2014/15 Bruce Davidson and Paul Caponigro: Two American Photographers in Britain and Ireland, The Huntington, MaryLou and George Boone Gallery Nov 8 2014 – March 9, 2015.
- 2016 An Ideal for Living: Photographing Class, Culture and Identity in Modern Britain Beetles+Huxley, London, July 27 – September 17.

== Collections ==
Davidson's work is held in the following permanent collections:

- Center for Creative Photography, University of Arizona, Tucson
- Huntington Library, San Marino, California
- International Center of Photography, New York
- Library of Congress, Washington, D.C.
- Los Angeles County Museum of Art (LACMA)
- Masur Museum of Art, Monroe, Louisiana
- Metropolitan Museum of Art, New York
- Museum of Contemporary Photography (MoCP), Chicago, Illinois
- National Gallery of Canada, Musée des Beaux-Arts du Canada, Ottawa
- New-York Historical Society, New York
- San Francisco Museum of Modern Art
- Whitney Museum of American Art, New York
- Yale Center for British Art, Yale University, New Haven, Connecticut

== See also ==
- List of photographers of the civil rights movement
