= Keith A. Smith =

American artist and author (born 1938)

- Born: 1938 (age 87–88); Tipton, Indiana
- Awards: Two Guggenheim Fellowships, a National Endowment of the Arts grant and a Pollock-Krasner Foundation grant

Keith A. Smith (born 1938 in Tipton, Indiana) is an American artist and author. He has taught at the Visual Studies Workshop, the School of the Art Institute of Chicago, and the University of Illinois. He is a recipient of two Guggenheim Fellowships, a National Endowment of the Arts grant and a Pollock-Krasner Foundation grant. Smith creates books as works of art, as well as instructional texts on how to make books. Permanent collections which hold works by Smith include the National Gallery of Art, Museum of Modern Art, the National Gallery of Canada, and the Center for Creative Photography.

== Education and teaching ==
Following military service in Vietnam where Smith was a chaplain's assistant for the US Army, Smith attended the School of the Art Institute of Chicago from 1963 to 1967. He received a master's degree in Photography in 1968 from the Institute of Design at the Illinois Institute of Technology.

In 1971, Smith returned to the School of the Art Institute of Chicago to teach in the printmaking and photography departments at the invitation of Ken Josephson. While continuing to teach, in 1974 Smith became an adjunct faculty member at Visual Studies Workshop, founded by curator and artist Nathan Lyons.

== Early recognition and exhibitions ==
Keith Smith first met the artist and curator Nathan Lyons while in his second year at the School of the Art Institute of Chicago. Lyons, then head of exhibitions at George Eastman House, included work by Smith in the exhibition “Seeing Photographically” in October 1966.

Also in 1966, Smith met John Szarkowski at New York's Museum of Modern Art. Szarkowski was impressed by the young artist and purchased a photograph and photo-etching for the Museum's collection. Smith was included in several group exhibitions at the Museum in the early 1970s: “Photography: New Acquisitions” in 1970, and “Unique/Multiple: Sculpture/Photographs” in 1973.

Smith's first solo exhibition “Photographs by Keith Smith” was held at the Art Institute of Chicago in 1968, while Smith was still a student at the School there. The show was organized by the institute's Curator of Prints and Drawings, Hugh Edwards.

In 1974, Keith Smith and Sonia Landy Sheridan collaborated on work using the 3M Color-in-Color process to reproduce the human form for the Museum of Modern Art's “Projects” series, which reported on recent developments in art. The pair collaborated on nine new works for the show, including three extremely large pieces up to 47 feet in length. The largest work, a nude figure, was constructed entirely of copies of 8 ½ x 11 inch prints of sections of the model's body enlarged and transferred to fabric.

Smith's 1966 photo-etching titled “Figure in a Landscape” was included in the landmark 1978 exhibition “Mirrors and Windows: American Photography since 1960” at the Museum of Modern Art. Curated by John Szarkowski, head of the Department of Photography, the show and accompanying catalogue featured the work of artists such as Diane Arbus, William Eggleston, Elliott Erwitt, Lee Friedlander, Stephen Shore, Ed Ruscha, Robert Rauschenberg and Garry Winogrand, among others.

== Artistic practice and bookmaking ==
Keith Smith is primarily known for his bookmaking, both as an artist and as a teacher. In addition, Smith is a printmaker, draftsman and photographer. His artwork and books are often unconventional in form, incorporating stitching, cutouts, holes and string, along with text, collage, drawings and prints.

In Book 95 “Structure of the Visual Book,” Smith said “All living things are in change. The finished book is a corpse. The observer views the remains, but the bookmaker has known the book while it was living and has seen many possibilities not told.”

To date, Smith has created over 280 books, including textbooks on bookmaking theory and techniques, poetry books, and unique artist's books, categorized by the artist as 1-picture books, no-picture books and conceptual books.

Smith emphasizes the “book experience” as the interaction the viewer has with the art object; viewing a book is a time-based experience that changes as the viewer moves through the sequence of the book by turning pages.

== Book Number 1 ==
Smith created his first book in 1967 while still a student at Art Institute of Chicago. “Book 1” is one-of-a-kind, with 32 photo-etchings and cased-in codex. The images in the book came from photographs Smith took during his commutes on buses and trains in the Chicago area, influenced by the subway photographs of Walker Evans.

== Book Number 200 ==
“Book 200” was written by the artist as an annotated bibliography documenting his previous 199 books. “Book 200” includes many examples from one-of-a-kind books that may not be seen elsewhere (other than the original), along with illustrations and photographs from the whole of Smith's bookmaking practice to that date.

== Textbooks ==
Smith has written eight books on book theory and bookmaking techniques: Structure of the Visual Book; Text in the Book Format; Bookbinding for Book Artists; five volumes of Non-Adhesive Binding: Books without Paste or Glue; 1- 2- & 3-Section Sewings; Exposed Spine Sewings; Smith's Sewing Single Sheets; and Quick Leather Bindings. These books are standard texts for book artists.

== Recent exhibitions ==
Bruce Silverstein Gallery, New York, presented a solo exhibition by Smith titled “Book by Book” in 2011. A second exhibition at the gallery in 2013 presented Smith's early photo-based works alongside prints and collages. In 2014, Smith's exhibition “Book by Book: 2nd Edition” was presented at the Printed Matter NY Art Book Fair at MoMA PS1. His work was also included in the Morgan Library's exhibition "A Collective Invention: Photographs at Play". In 2018, the retrospective exhibition Keith Smith at Home was organized by the Philadelphia Museum of Art.
