= Ralph Hattersley =

American photographic educator, commentator, journalist and photographer (1921-2000)

Ralph M. Hattersley, Jr. (1921-2000) was an American photographic educator, commentator, journalist and photographer.

== Early life and education ==
Ralph M. Hattersley, Jr. (1921-2000) was born on March 31, 1921, in Montana where he grew up in Conrad. After graduating from high school, Hattersley spent a year studying art at the University of Washington, then left to attend Montana State College in 1941. Two years later, Hattersley joined the U.S. Navy, attending its photography school in Pensacola. He served on the Atlantic Fleet Camera Party, spending most of his time in Trinidad. He was discharged from the Navy in 1946.

Upon returning to the U.S., Hattersley enrolled in the Rochester Athenaeum and Mechanics Institute's photography program.

== Rochester Institute of Technology ==
Hattersley graduated in 1948 from Rochester Institute of Technology (as Rochester Athenaeum and Mechanics Institute was renamed in 1944) and began teaching in the Department of Photographic Technology. In 1949, he was offered a full-time faculty position there, which he accepted and taught alongside Minor White, Charles Arnold, Beaumont Newhall and Robert Koch. Having both an art and photography background, Hattersley taught photo-illustration and art-based photography classes at the Institute for the next thirteen years.

== Theorist and commentator ==
Hattersley wrote colourfully on his theories on the principles and procedures of photographic criticism in a lengthy article in Aperture magazine which it reprinted from Popular Photography, and his criticism appeared in numbers of publications, including in the American Society of Magazine Photographers magazine Infinity for which he was the managing editor.

Like his contemporary Minor White, Hattersley regarded photography as having a spiritual dimension; after pages of uncredited, uncaptioned photographs in a 1972 Aperture issue appears his statement;

Photography has come closer to being a religion than anything else most of us have ever had.”

He wrote about printing in a darkroom as an opportunity for meditation, a quiet time that can be therapeutic, and further, that "the upside-down image on the ground glass tends to engage the right side of the brain, the artist's side, more than the technical, left side of the brain." White, in his Aperture editorial in 1964 praised his approach;

On sober thought one might say that we are witnessing a resurgence of meaningful photocriticism. Ralph Hattersley when on the masthead of INFINITY started something that both he and INFINITY continue in the field of criticism.

Hattersley's book, Discover Yourself Through Photography enlarged on his ideas. Across the Atlantic however, British commentators regarded such sentiments about the medium with caution.

== Photographer ==
In 1961 Ralph Ginzburg approached designer Herb Lubalin to design a new up-market periodical called Eros, a magazine which took love and sex as its theme. It became the subject of a notorious freedom-of-speech trial with Ginzburg eventually being imprisoned in 1972 for 'distributing obscene material'; Hattersley's nude photographs are widely credited as being the trigger for the court case.

== Later career ==
After teaching at the Rochester Institute of Technology, Hattersley moved to New York City. While there, he taught at various institutions including Columbia University, Pratt Institute, and the School of Visual Arts where he taught with Martin Friedman, Cora Kennedy, Roy Benson and Irene Stern. He served as a contributing editor to Popular Photography starting in 1957, in which he wrote the column 'The Hattersley Class For Beginners'.

Hattersley died on February 5, 2000, survived by his children, Cleve, Craig, and Lissa.

== Influence ==
Hattersley was influential on a number of his students who went on to contribute significantly to the field. Among them were;

- Pete Turner;
- Jerry Uelsmann, who described him as one of “my three photographic godfathers: Ralph Hattersley, Minor White, and Henry Holmes Smith”; Bruce Gilden;
- Bruce Davidson, who studied at RIT 1951-4, remembered “an inspiring teacher, Ralph Hattersley. He showed us Smith, Cartier-Bresson, Irving Penn, and others. This really sent me in that direction—not imitating, but finding the way I wanted to photograph”;
- Nathan Lyons;
- Hugh C. Browning;
- Sardi Klein
- Arno Rafael Minkkinen (who studied under Hattersley at School of Visual Arts, 1971 - 1972),
- Australian Roger Hayne who was inspired by Hattersley's course to set up Photography Studies College in Melbourne

Another student, Carl Chiarenza, hoped that attending the Rochester Institute of Technology (RIT) would lead to ‘a decent job at Kodak’. In his third year there, the Bachelor of Fine Arts degree program in photography was offered, developed by White and Hattersley. Chiarenza recalls,

They were both extraordinarily creative as well as crazy in many ways, but had a major influence on my career and my photography. Minor would have us sit and analyze a photograph edge to edge for an hour and then write about it, because ‘everything in it is important.’ Ralph would tell us to dig through the darkroom’s trash basket and think about what you might do differently with a photo instead of throwing it out.[...] RIT’s photo department…faculty that included Ralph Hattersley, Minor White, Charles Arnold, Beaumont Newhall and others (plus Robert Koch teaching literature and creative writing), was extraordinarily creative. Our class, after the first two years, was a very small group. There were only 14 of us. We were quite aware that something different was happening. Ralph Hattersley and Minor White pulled to opposite poles. Both used this medium of photography to express ideas, but they were very different. As you can imagine, there were a lot of discussions...

== Publications ==
- Hattersley, Ralph (1971), Discover your self through photography : a creative workbook for amateur and professional, Association Press, ISBN 978-0-8096-1784-5
- Feininger, Andreas; Hattersley, Ralph (1973), Andreas Feininger, Morgan & Morgan, ISBN 978-0-87100-042-2
- Hattersley, Ralph (1974), Beginner's guide to photography (1st ed.), Doubleday, ISBN 978-0-385-02083-1
- Hattersley, Ralph (1976), Beginner's guide to darkroom techniques (1st ed.), Dolphin Books, Doubleday & Co, ISBN 978-0-385-11073-0
- Hattersley, Ralph (1977), Photographic printing, Prentice-Hall, ISBN 978-0-13-665281-6
- Hattersley, Ralph (1978), Beginner's guide to photographing people (1st ed.), Dolphin Books, ISBN 978-0-385-12689-2
- Hattersley, Ralph (1979), Beginner's guide to color photography, Dolphin Books, ISBN 978-0-385-14089-8
- Hattersley, Ralph (1979), Photographic lighting : learning to see, Prentice-Hall, ISBN 978-0-13-665323-3
- Hattersley, Ralph (1981), Beginning photography (1st ed.), Doubleday, ISBN 978-0-385-17318-6
- Ralph Hattersley ‘A Handy Kit for Do-It-Yourself Critics’. In Traub, Charles; Heller, Steven; Bell, Adam B., eds. (2006), The education of a photographer, New York Allworth Press, ISBN 978-1-58115-830-4
- Ralph Hattersley was managing editor of, and wrote in, American Society of Magazine Photographers; ASMP-The Society of Photographers in Communications (1952), Infinity, American Society of Magazine Photographers, ISSN 0019-9583
