= Winter Prather =

American photographer (1926–2005)

Winter Phillips Prather (1926–2005) was a commercial and fine art photographer who worked in Denver, Colorado and Taos, New Mexico from the 1940s to the 1970s.

== Early life and education ==
Prather was born in Pontiac, Michigan on May 13, 1926 to Louise Agnes Winter (1894-1976) and Allen Ransom Prather (1892-1967) and was an only child. Prather attended the University of Denver and graduated in 1945 with a Bachelor of Arts in History. Between 1945 and 1950, Prather completed graduate coursework in art and art history at the University of Denver. Prather took photographs throughout his college years. He began to sell his work during graduate school and marked 1948 as the beginning of his career as a professional photographer.

== Career ==
In 1951, the Denver Institute of Technology hired Prather to photograph the Underground Explosion Project. The Underground Explosion Project took place at the Dugway Proving Ground in Utah, and Buckhorn Wash and Unaweep Canyon in Colorado. According to the federal government, the tests did not involve exploding nuclear bombs. Rather, nuclear scientists detonated secret underground explosions with non-atomic conventional weapons. They hoped to study effects expected from future underground atomic explosions at the Nevada Test Site. Prather also helped produce motion picture film of the testing.

Prather left the Denver Research Institute the following year to pursue a career in freelance photography. Photographing mostly in Denver over the next 20 years (except for a stint in New York City from 1957-1958), Prather was a success in both fine art and commercial photography. His photographs were featured in Camera, Modern Photography, Domus, American Heritage, Applied Photography, and Holiday magazines. Prather's commercial clients included the Carborundum Company, the Mithun Ad Agency, and Johns Manville, and he was known to bill $1,000 per day. He also worked with several local and international architects such as Gio Ponti, who designed the Denver Art Museum.

During this time, Prather was drawn into the social and professional circles of the photographic elite. In the 1950s, Prather met or established relationships with Ansel Adams, Minor White, John Morris, Edward Weston, and Beaumont Newhall. Prather and White became particularly close as White frequently visited Denver to conduct workshops. An informal community that included Prather as well as Walter Chappell, Arnold Gasson, Syl Labrot, Nile Root, and James Milmoe formed around these events.

In the early 1970s, Prather moved to the "Adobe Acre," the Prathers' sprawling family home in Taos, New Mexico. After his mother's death in 1976, Prather defied her will and sold the home, using the money to finance a move to Basel, Switzerland. It was during this time that Prather began to suffer from mini-strokes that caused intense breaks with reality and interfered with his ability to work. Some believe that Prather's health issues may have been the result of toxic exposure to the selenium that he used to tone his prints. Prather achieved moderate success as a fine art photographer in Europe; his work was acquired by several collectors there. Yet, he had difficulty getting commercial work. Dwindling finances forced Prather to return to Denver the following year.

The deaths of his parents, the failed move to Europe, and a growing obsession with mysticism only served to exacerbate the photographer's mental and physical illnesses. Prather continued to have difficulty getting work, leading him into poverty and increased mental instability. Prather was committed to the state's care some time in the 1990s, his talent largely forgotten.

== Death and legacy ==
Prather died in Commerce City, Colorado on March 18, 2005. After his death, Prather's work was included in a group show of early contemporary Colorado photography at the now-defunct Gallery Sink in Denver. Randy Roberts, owner of the Z Art Department, attended the show and later had the opportunity to purchase a group of the Prather's photographs. The result was a 200 print retrospective exhibition of Prather's work as well as an accompanying book.

Some of Prather's friends in Denver, including photographer David DeHarport, donated a number of Prather's manuscript and photographic materials to the History Colorado Center. In 2015, History Colorado announced that it had been awarded a National Historic Records and Publications Commission (a division of the National Archives and Records Administration) Access to Historical Records grant that would enable the institution to further process and catalog its holdings related to Winter Prather, as well as photographers David DeHarport, the Aultman Studio of Trinidad, Colorado, and Fred Payne Clatworthy.
