= David Litschel =

American photographer and photography educator

- Citizenship: American
- Education: University of Colorado Boulder, University of Michigan
- Occupations: Photographer, photography educator
- Known for: Photography and photography education
- Notable work: Fugitive Color
- Spouse: Martha Shilliday
- Website: www.davidlitschelphotography.com

David Litschel is an American photographer and photography educator. His work includes travel, stock, street, and fine-art photography. He taught photography at the Brooks Institute in Santa Barbara, California, and later served in administrative positions including provost.

Litschel has authored books on photography and organized exhibitions of photographic work. His photographs are held in the collections of several American museums.

== Early life and education ==
Litschel studied art at the University of Colorado Boulder, graduating in 1974. He was elected to Phi Beta Kappa while attending the university. He later pursued graduate studies in art at the University of Michigan.

In 1982, while a graduate student at the University of Michigan, Litschel organized Fugitive Color, an exhibition featuring the work of 22 photographers. The exhibition was held at the university's Slusser Gallery in January 1982. A catalogue accompanying the exhibition was published under the title Fugitive Color, with Litschel credited in connection with the publication. The exhibition and catalogue were also documented in Exposure, the publication of the Society for Photographic Education.

== Career ==
Litschel worked in photography and photography education. He joined the faculty of the Brooks Institute of Photography in California, where he taught for several years. He later held administrative positions at the institute, including director of education, vice president of academic affairs, and provost. He retired from Brooks Institute in 2010.

Litschel was involved with professional organizations related to photography education. A publication of the Association of Texas Photography Instructors identified him as president-elect of the Professional Imaging Education Association and noted his affiliation with Brooks Institute.

Litschel worked in travel, stock, street, and fine-art photography. His photographs are held in the collections of the Toledo Museum of Art, and the University of Michigan.

His photographs have been published in Archaeology, the magazine of the Archaeological Institute of America. One article featuring his photographs concerned archaeological excavations at Colonial Pemaquid in Maine.

Litschel has also contributed to photography books, including Black & White Photography and Digital Photographic Capture, published by Focal Press in 2005.

In 2016, The Santa Barbara Independent reported that Litschel taught a photography class for young people in Santa Barbara. The class was conducted through Arts for Humanity! and the Housing Authority of the City of Santa Barbara.

== Honors ==
Litschel was elected to Phi Beta Kappa while studying at the University of Colorado Boulder.

== Personal life ==
Litschel lives in Santa Barbara, California. He is married to Martha Shilliday. The couple has participated in Habitat for Humanity projects in Latin America, including housebuilding projects in Guatemala, Paraguay, and Bolivia.
