= Chiarenza =

Chiarenza may refer to:

- Chiarenza, a former name of Glarentza, Greece
- Chiarenza, an Italian surname:
  - Carl Chiarenza (b. 1935), an American photographer
  - Vincenzo Chiarenza (b. 1954), an Italian soccer player and coach
- A magical sword of Italian legend, preserved in the Russian tales of the Sword Kladenets
