= Duane Michals =

American photographer (1932–2026)

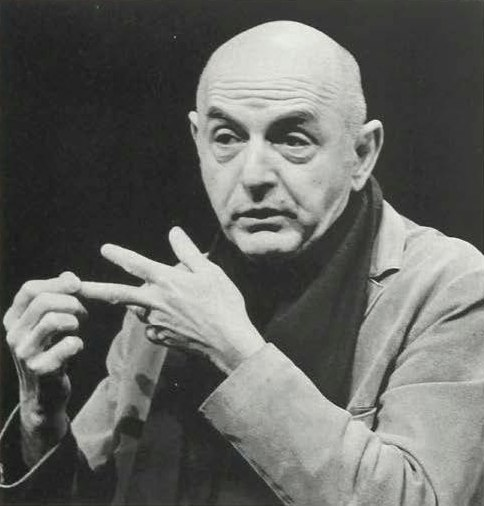
- Michals circa 1984
- Born: February 18, 1932; McKeesport, Pennsylvania, U.S.
- Died: June 9, 2026 (aged 94); New York City, U.S.
- Occupation: Photographer
- Years active: 1958–2026
- Known for: Innovative use of photo-sequences, often incorporating handwritten text to examine emotion and philosophy
- Notable work: Sequences, The Journey of the Spirit after Death, Chance Meeting: Photographs

Duane Stephen Michals (/ˈmaɪkəlz/ "Michaels"; February 18, 1932 – June 9, 2026) was an American photographer whose work, full of narrative at a time when the photography world was not focused on it, often showed the influence of surrealism. Michals made innovative use of photo-sequences and often incorporated handwritten text to examine emotion and philosophy.

== Education and career ==
Michals's interest in art began at age 14 while attending university-level classes in watercolor at the Carnegie Institute in Pittsburgh. In 1953, he received a B.A. from the University of Denver. In 1956, after two years in the U.S. Army, he went on to study at the Parsons School of Design with a plan to become a graphic designer; however, he did not complete his studies.

He described his photographic skills as "completely self-taught." In 1958, while on vacation in the USSR, he discovered an interest in photography. The photographs he made during this trip became his first exhibition, held in 1963 at the Underground Gallery in New York City.

For a number of years, Michals was mostly a commercial photographer working for Esquire and Mademoiselle. For Vogue he covered the filming of 1974's The Great Gatsby. He did not have a studio. Instead, he took portraits of people in their environment, in contrast to the method of other, more famous photographers at the time, such as Richard Avedon and Irving Penn.

Michals was hired by the Mexican government to photograph the 1968 Summer Olympics; two years later, photos from this commission were exhibited in New York City at the Museum of Modern Art. Portraits he took between 1958 and 1988 would later become the basis of his book Album.

In 1976, Michals received a grant from the National Endowment for the Arts. He also produced the art for the albums Synchronicity (by The Police) in 1983 and Clouds Over Eden by Richard Barone in 1993.

== Artistic influences and impact ==
First Holy Communion by Duane Michals, 2012

Though he was not directly involved in gay civil rights, his photography addressed aspects of gayness, especially in urban settings. In 1987, after several years of devastation in the gay community caused by AIDS and political indifference to it or even happiness about it from mainstream politicians at almost every level of government throughout the United States and most of the world, Michals discussed his notion of the artist's relationship to politics and power:

I feel the political aspirations are impotent. They can never be seen. If they are, it will only be by a limited audience. If one is to act politically, one simply puts down the camera and goes out and does something. I think of someone like Heartfield who ridiculed the Nazis. Who very creatively took great stands. He could have been killed at any moment, he was Jewish, and my God what the guy did. It was extraordinary. You don't see that now.

Michals cited Balthus, William Blake, Lewis Carroll, Thomas Eakins, René Magritte, Giorgio de Chirico, and Walt Whitman as influences on his art; Balthus, Magritte, and de Chirico allowed him to photograph them. In turn, he has influenced photographers such as David Levinthal and Francesca Woodman.

Michals is noted for two innovations in artistic photography developed in the 1960s and 1970s. First, he "[told] a story through a series of photos" as in his 1970 book Sequences. Second, he handwrote text near his photographs, thereby giving information that the image itself could not convey.

== Personal life and death ==
Michals was born in McKeesport, Pennsylvania, on February 18, 1932, and lived in New York City. He was raised Catholic.

Michals's partner, then husband, Frederick Gorrée died in 2017. The two had been together since 1960.

Duane Michals died in Manhattan on June 9, 2026, at the age of 94.

== Publications ==
- Michals, Duane (1970). Sequences. Garden City, NY: Doubleday.
- Michals, Duane (1971). The Journey of the Spirit After Death. New York: Winter House. ISBN 978-0-87806-025-2.
- Michals, Duane (1973). Chance Meeting: Photographs. Köln: A. & J. Wilde.
- Michals, Duane (1976). Take One and See Mt. Fujiyama, and Other Stories. Rochester, NY: Light Impressions. ISBN 978-0-916614-00-3.
- Michals, Duane (1976). Real Dreams: Photostories. Danbury, NH: Addison House. ISBN 978-0-89169-005-4.
- Michals, Duane (1978). Merveilles d'Egypt. Paris: Denoël-Filipacchi.
- Michals, Duane; Cavafy, Constantine (1978). Homage to Cavafy. Danbury, NH: Addison House. ISBN 978-0-89169-019-1.
- Michals, Duane (1981). A Visit with Magritte. Providence, RI: Matrix. ISBN 978-0-936554-05-1.
- Michals, Duane (1983). Duane Michals. London: Thames and Hudson. ISBN 978-0-500-41071-4.
- Michals, Duane; Livingstone, Marco (1984). Duane Michals: Photographs, Sequences, Texts, 1958–1984. Oxford: Museum of Modern Art. ISBN 978-0-905836-46-1.
- Michals, Duane (1984). Sleep and Dream. New York: Lustrum Press. ISBN 978-0-912810-46-1.
- Michals, Duane (1986). Duane Michals. New York: Pantheon Books. ISBN 978-0-394-74446-9.
- Michals, Duane (1986). The Nature of Desire. Pasadena, CA: Twelvetrees Press. ISBN 978-0-942642-23-0.
- Michals, Duane (1988). Album: the Portraits of Duane Michals, 1958–1988. Pasadena, CA: Twelvetrees Press. ISBN 978-0-942642-36-0.
- Michals, Duane; Kozloff, Max (1990). Now Becoming Then. Altadena, CA: Twin Palms. ISBN 978-0-944092-12-5.
- Michals, Duane (1992). Eros & Thanatos. Santa Fe, NM: Twin Palms. ISBN 978-0-944092-20-0.
- Salter, James; Michals, Duane (1992). Still Such. New York: W. Drenttel. ISBN 978-0-9625224-2-0.
- Michals, Duane (1993). Upside Down, Inside Out, and Backwards. Sonny Boy Books. ISBN 978-0-9638863-0-9.
- Michals, Duane (1996). Salute, Walt Whitman. Santa Fe, NM: Twin Palms. ISBN 978-0-944092-34-7.
- Michals, Duane; Livingstone, Marco (1997). The Essential Duane Michals. Boston, MA: Little, Brown. ISBN 978-0-8212-2463-2.
- Michals, Duane (2001). Questions Without Answers. Santa Fe, NM: Twin Palms. ISBN 978-0-944092-86-6.
- Michals, Duane (2003). The House I Once Called Home: a Photographic Memoir with Verse. London: Enitharmon Editions. ISBN 978-1-900564-73-1.
- Michals, Duane (2006). Foto Follies: How Photography Lost Its Virginity on the Way to the Bank. Göttingen: Steidl. ISBN 978-3-86521-275-7.
- Michals, Duane; Grey, Joel (2007). The Adventures of Constantine Cavafy. Santa Fe, NM: Twin Palms. ISBN 978-1-931885-54-6.
- Michals, Duane (2008). Duane Michals. London: Thames & Hudson. ISBN 978-0-500-41071-4.

== Exhibitions ==
=== Solo exhibitions ===
- 1970: Museum of Modern Art, New York City
- 1971: George Eastman House, Rochester, NY
- 1976: Wadsworth Atheneum, Hartford, CT
- 2005: International Center of Photography, New York City
- 2008: Museum of Photography, Thessaloniki, Greece
- 2014: Carnegie Museum of Art, Pittsburgh, PA
- 2015: Peabody Essex Museum, Salem, MA
- 2018: Duane Michals: The Portraitist, Crocker Art Museum, Sacramento, CA
- 2019-2020: Illusions of the Photographer: Duane Michals at the Morgan, Morgan Library & Museum, New York, New York
- 2026: Duane Michals: Beyond Likeness, The Vicki Myhren Gallery, University of Denver, Denver, CO

=== Group exhibitions ===
- 1966: Toward a Social Landscape, George Eastman House, Rochester, NY. Photographs by Michals, Bruce Davidson, Lee Friedlander, Danny Lyon, and Garry Winogrand. Curated by Nathan Lyons.
- 1999: Cosmos, Musée de Beaux-Arts de Montréal
- 1999: The Century of the Body: Photoworks 1900–2000, Musée de l'Élysée, Lausanne
- 1999: From Camouflage to Free Style, Musée d'Art Moderne de la Ville de Paris
- 2004: The Ecstasy of Things, Fotomuseum Winterthur, Switzerland

== Awards ==
- 1991: Honorary Fellowship, The Royal Photographic Society
- 1994: Gold medal for photography, National Arts Club
- 2000: Masters Series Award, School of Visual Arts
- 2020: Induction into the International Photography Hall of Fame and Museum
