= Afterimage (magazine) =

Journal of contemporary art, culture, and politics

Afterimage: The Journal of Media Arts and Cultural Criticism

- Cover of the journal since volume 46, issue 1 (2019)
- Editor: Karen vanMeenan
- Categories: Arts, Politics
- Frequency: Bimonthly
- Publisher: 1972 - 2018: Visual Studies Workshop; 2018 - current: University of California Press
- Founder: Nathan Lyons
- Founded: 1972
- Country: United States
- Language: English
- Website: online.ucpress.edu/afterimage
- ISSN: 0300-7472

Afterimage: The Journal of Media Arts and Cultural Criticism is a bimonthly magazine of contemporary art, culture, and politics. It publishes features, essays, local and international reportage, exhibition reviews, and book reviews with an emphasis on social dialogue, politically engaged artistic practices, and the role of the artist as cultural critic and curator.

The magazine was published by the Visual Studies Workshop, a nonprofit, artist-run, education center for photography and other media arts based in Rochester, New York and since 2018, published by the University of California Press.

== History ==
Afterimage was founded in 1972 by photographer and curator Nathan Lyons, who had previously served as assistant director and chief curator of the international museum of photography known as George Eastman House.

From its inaugural issue, the magazine aimed to pose "a challenge to existing centres of practice and education" as well as "to institutional hierarchies, widening the remit of art criticism and theoretical debate and engaging directly with context, community and issues of accountability."

Former Afterimage editor Grant H. Kester described the ethos of the magazine in terms of two primary modes of resistance:

- "an attempt to contest the then dominant tendency to view art photography as a form of pure expression that must remain uncontaminated by more mundane or quotidian uses of the medium"
- "a desire to break down the division between the practicing artist and the historian or critic, resulting in new hybrid figures such as the 'artist/curator' or the 'artist/critic'"

== Contributors ==
The magazine's list of contributors has included notable artists such as Coco Fusco and Martha Rosler.
