= Visual Studies Workshop =

Art education organization in Rochester, New York

- Established: 1969
- Location: 36 King Street; Rochester, New York 14608
- Coordinates: 43°9′15.8″N 77°37′35.8″W
- Founder: Nathan Lyons
- Director: Jessica Johnston
- Website: www.vsw.org

Visual Studies Workshop (VSW) is a non-profit organization dedicated to art education based in Rochester, New York, located in the Susan B. Anthony Neighborhood. It was founded in 1969 by photographer, writer, curator and educator, Nathan Lyons. VSW is an artist-run educational and support center for photography, artist books, media arts, and experimental games. VSW publishes artists' books, screens films in its theater, exhibits artwork, holds collections, and hosts artists-in-residence. The organization ran a Master of Fine Arts (MFA) program through the University at Buffalo until 1981, and then through State University of New York at Brockport until 2022. Since its inception, VSW has had connections with regional artists and communities involved with early experimental video and media access, including Experimental Television Center, Steina and Woody Vasulka, the Videofreex, and in particular, Rochester's grassroots media access organization, Portable Channel.

== History ==
In the Winter 1961 issue of Aperture, Nathan Lyons described the very first photography workshops he led that would eventually lead to the formation of Visual Studies Workshop. These workshops began in 1959 and centered around "discussion concerning 'creative photography'" and the texts of György Kepes and László Moholy-Nagy. In 1968, Lyons proposed a program in Photographic Studies to Eric Larrabee, the provost of the University at Buffalo. The proposal included Lyons, Beaumont Newhall, and John Wood as instructors. This led to a pilot program at the George Eastman Museum, where Lyons was curator, and following Lyons' resignation from the museum, the founding of VSW in 1969.

The word "art" is seldom mentioned at the Visual Studies Workshop in Rochester, New York. There's plenty of talk, however, about "perception" and "process." The director of the workshop is Nathan Lyons, who founded it all in a dingy Rochester factory loft four years ago. Today, a group of seven faculty members and eighty students are working in an environment they hope may eventually serve as "a model of possibilities" for society at large. Their "community" is concerned with the relevance of the visual in our lives and the ways in which visual insights can be used.

— Barbara Confino, "Photography is Not an Art: It Is a Model of Perception" (1973)

Starting in 1969, Visual Studies Workshop offered a Master of Fine Arts (MFA) degree through the University at Buffalo, a program with a focus on expanding the potential for photography, books, and media arts. American photographer Charles H. Traub described VSW as the "first school to stimulate curatorial interest in photography." This environment differed from a traditional arts-academic setting, with students from a range of backgrounds that were not exclusive to visual arts. The MFA program was interdisciplinary, with Lyons describing it as "a more collective activity." Later, the MFA program was transferred to SUNY Brockport, where it accepted new students until 2022.

A diverse range of artists have taught at, published through, and stayed in-residence at VSW, including Jacki Apple, Ulises Carrión, Robert Frank, Eikoh Hosoe, Nam June Paik, Keith A. Smith, Buzz Spector, Carrie Mae Weems, and many others. The Society for Photographic Education (SPE) Northeast Chapter Conference was held at VSW in 2012 in conjunction with the opening of an exhibition by Hank Willis Thomas. Nathan Lyons, one of the original founders of SPE, spoke at the conference.

== Collections ==
VSW maintains both archival and research collections of photography, independent film and video, electronic imaging, visual books and the publication arts. The Research Center hosts the Independent Press Archive which is one of the largest collections of artists’ books in the northeast with around 27,000 prints from 19th century vernacular images to contemporary experimental works. The Soibelman Picture Agency Archives is also present with around 40,000 international press images from the 1920s and 30s. The collection also contains Joseph Selle's Fox Movie Flash Archive with an estimated 800,000 images of people on the streets of San Francisco in the 1940s to the 1960s. VSW also holds the archives of Lejaren à Hiller who was an American illustrator and photographer and who is widely known for American photographic illustration.

VSW holds the Portable Channel tape archive, over 900 magnetic tapes chronicling Rochester's history of grassroots activism and protest in the 1970s. Portable Channel supported community access to video equipment and training, and produced Homemade TV, which aired on WXXI-TV from 1972 through 1975.

== Afterimage ==
Afterimage: The Journal of Media Arts and Cultural Criticism was founded in 1972 by Nathan Lyons. From its inaugural issue, the magazine aimed to pose "a challenge to existing centres of practice and education" as well as "to institutional hierarchies, widening the remit of art criticism and theoretical debate and engaging directly with context, community and issues of accountability."

Afterimage is a bi-monthly publication that was produced by Visual Studies Workshop from 1972 through 2018 and is currently published by the University of California Press. The publication includes visual arts, photography, independent film, and video, new media and alternative publishing. It covers topics of issues and debates within art history, visual and cultural studies, and related fields. Afterimage also includes articles, conference and festival reports, book and exhibition reviews, artist's books, and exhibition catalogs.

== VSW Press ==
The works of VSW Press in many ways exemplify and define the elusive character of the artists' books as a democratic multiple. These works are made by artists as books, first and foremost, and are produced to sell in an affordable market, though often only because of the generous subsidies which the Lyons and individual artists are able to generate to support their production. In American artists' books, VSW Press has had a tremendous influence, with work by figures who made major contributions to the field having spun off from its graduate program or been directly produced under its auspices.

— Johanna Drucker, The Century of Artists' Books (1995)

VSW Press was founded by Joan Lyons in 1971. In 1984, Lyons edited the first anthology of critical essays and sources for the field of artists' books, Artists' books : a critical anthology and sourcebook. In the beginning, VSW first provided printing presses for artists to experiment with. VSW then began employing professionals to run a Heidelberg offset press to produce publications that artists, staff, and students had constructed. The process of publication was then switched to digital means with the addition of a computer lab. Many artists-in-residence that have come through VSW have published through VSW Press.

== See also ==
- Rochester's Culture and Recreation
