= Joan Lyons =

American artist known for photography, printmaking, and book arts

Joan Lyons (born 1937) is an American artist known for her work in photography, printmaking, and book arts. She is the Founding Director of Rochester's Visual Studies Workshop Press.

== Early life and education ==
Lyons was born in New York, New York.

Lyons has a BFA from Alfred University, New York (1957), and an MFA from SUNY Buffalo, New York (1973).

== Career ==
In 1971, Lyons co-founded the VSW Press at the Rochester-based Visual Studies Workshop.

The preview material for a 2023 retrospective at the University of Rochester states, "Joan Lyons has been a fearless innovator in a wide range of historical and contemporary image-making processes, as well as newly invented reproduction technologies of the 1960s–1980s. Lyons embraces chance and uncertainty as opportunities for discovery." It continues, "While Lyons is adept with process and equipment, her starting point is the idea that the people and everyday objects around us accrue value from our interactions with them. The humble objects she pictures—chairs, plants, a well-used apron—achieve a heightened status as artifacts owned, used, and perceived by humans. From the '60s through the '80s, she created a feminist inquiry into the deeply personal and particular as subjects for her art. To this day she continues to investigate the power and conventions of photography, image-making, and representation within Western culture."

Additional retrospectives include in 2007 at the Rochester Contemporary Art Center; and in 2018 at Steven Kasher Gallery in New York and Paris. The Steven Kasher Gallery claims, "Her groundbreaking work freely combines feminist theory and personal experience. Her work is intimate and introspective, questioning the indexical quality of photography. Lyons' work defies every artistic taboo of the 1950s. She had been taught that contemporary art should be universal, gestural, abstract, monumental, qualities which are inherently masculine. After trying and failing to follow these mandates, Lyons' realized that her work could not be separated from her own experiences as a woman. Her personal narrative, different in content and tone from the dominant male voice, pushed her to establish new artistic structures."

BFA at Alfred University, New York (1957), and an MFA at SUNY Buffalo, New York (1973)

Lyons' work is included in the collections of the Museum of Fine Arts, Houston, the Museum of Contemporary Photography Chicago, the Museum of Modern Art, the Minneapolis Institute of Art, and the National Gallery of Canada, and the National Museum of Women in the Arts.

The Joan Lyons Independent Press Archive is located at the Visual Studies Workshop in Rochester New York.

== Publications ==
- Artists' Books: A Critical Anthology and Sourcebook (1986, 1988, 1991, 1993)
- Artists' Books: Visual Studies Workshop Press 1972–2008 (2009)
