= Fred Payne Clatworthy =

American landscape photographer

Fred Payne Clatworthy (1875–1953) was a landscape photographer who worked primarily out of Estes Park, Colorado. He was known for his work with the Autochrome Lumiere screen plate, an early color photography format.

== Early life and education ==
Clatworthy was born in Dayton, Ohio, on August 30, 1875, to Emma Payne Clatworthy (1853–1936) and Frederick Clatworthy (1846–1905). He had one sister, Linda Clatworthy (1877–1933). Clatworthy received his first camera at 13 and began selling his images. At 18, Clatworthy attended Dennison University in Granville, Ohio, and later transferred to Stetson University in Deland, Florida. Clatworthy studied medicine and continued shooting photographs throughout his college years.

== Early travels in the Western United States ==
An avid traveler, Clatworthy conceived of a plan to bicycle across the continental United States while in college. After his graduation from Stetson University in 1896, Clatworthy traveled by steamship to Brooklyn, New York. From there, he bicycled to his parents’ home in Evanston, Illinois. He considered this the first leg of a cross-continental journey. He spent the next two years in the Chicago area working as an office boy and attending the University of Chicago Law School. Then, in June 1898, Clatworthy embarked from his parents’ residence and spent the next year bicycling across the Western United States. Clatworthy's route took him through Iowa, Nebraska, Colorado, New Mexico, Arizona, California, and Washington. He documented much of the journey with a 4x5" view camera. In 1900, Clatworthy traveled across the Yuma Desert from Los Angeles, California, to Flagstaff, Arizona, via wagon and mule team. He sold some of the photographs that he shot at Grand Canyon National Park during the trip to the Atchison, Topeka and Santa Fe Railway.

== Career ==
After spending two years ranching near Loveland, Colorado, Clatworthy visited Estes Park in 1904 and decided to relocate. Soon after his first visit, Clatworthy purchased two lots on the west end of Estes Park. He erected a tent house on the property and started a photography business. He used water from the nearby Thompson River to develop and print photographs. In 1905, Clatworthy built a small building on his property and named it "Ye Littel Shop." In addition to serving as the base of Clatworthy's photographic operations, "Ye Littel Shop" also functioned as a curio store. There, Clatworthy sold a variety of items including furniture, produce, Kodak cameras, film, and Clatworthy's own images of the area. In the coming years, Clatworthy would develop additional business interests in the Estes Park area including rental cottages, a Spaulding Athletic Agency, a Kodak store, and briefly, a zippy laundry service. Clatworthy also served as the official photographer for the Stanley Hotel, Covenant Heights, and the Rocky Mountain Young Men's Christian Association. In addition, his landscape photography was featured in the Outlook, Century, World's Work, Country Life Magazine at this time.

Clatworthy began to produce Autochromes, the format for which he would become internationally known, in 1914. In exchange for image use rights to Clatworthy's Autochromes, railways and transportation companies began to send him on all-expenses-paid photo assignments to various locations. By the end of his career, Clatworthy counted the Chicago, Burlington and Quincy Railroad, the Denver and Rio Grande Western Railroad, the Northern Pacific Railway, the Southern Pacific Transportation Company, and the Union Pacific Railroad among his clients. While Clatworthy mostly worked in national parks throughout the American West, he also traveled outside of the continental United States to shoot Autochromes. For instance, the Matson Lines sent Clatworthy to Hawaii in 1926; the Union Steamship Company and Matson Lines sent Clatworthy on a tour of Polynesia that included stops in New Zealand, Tahiti, the Cook Islands and Hawaii in 1928; and the Southern Pacific Transportation Company sent Clatworthy to Mexico in 1929 and 1930.

In 1917, Clatworthy presented Autochromes of Estes Park and Rocky Mountain National Park (RMNP) before members of the United States Congress. Held at the Smithsonian Institution in Washington, D.C., Clatworthy's exhibition was part of an effort headed by Colorado senator John F. Shafroth to increase the area of RMNP. The senate passed Shafroth's bill, which had been stalled for the past year, the day after Clatworthy's presentation. It was also around this time that Clatworthy became acquainted with the National Geographic Society. Approximately 100 of Clatworthy's Autochromes accompanied photo essays in National Geographic magazine between 1923 and 1934, and he became one illustration editor Franklin Fisher's go-to Autochromists. The National Geographic articles included: "Western Views in the Land of the Best" (April 1923); "Photographing the Marvels of the West in Colors" (June 1928); "Scenic Glories of Western United States: Autochromes" (August 1929); "Adventures in Color in Mexico's West Coast" (July 1930); "Colorado: Among the Peaks and Parks of the Rockies" (July 1932); "Sunshine Land of Fruits, Flowers and Sport" (November 1934). Finally, this 1917 trip also marked the beginning of Clatworthy's career as a slide lecturer. For the next 21 years, Clatworthy would spend his off-seasons presenting Autochromes to packed venues throughout the country. Clatwothy's most notable lecture venues included the Field Museum, the American Museum of Natural History, and Carnegie Museum of Natural History. Between Clatworthy's lectures and published images, his work was seen by over ten million people in over 160 countries.

== Personal life ==
In 1911, Clatworthy married Mabel Leonard Clatworthy (1885–1971). They had children: Fred Payne Clatworthy Jr. (1912–1995), Helen Clatworthy (1915–2001), and Barbara Clatworthy Gish (1921–2011). In 1912, construction was completed on the Clatworthy family home located on Riverside Drive in Estes Park. In the following years, the familf split their time between this residence and a second home purchased by Clatworthy in 1921 near Palm Springs, California.

== Later life and death ==
During the 1940s, Clatworthy partnered with his son, Fred Clatworthy, Jr., to produce chromogenic color images of the Estes Park area for calendar and postcard reporductions. In 1949, Clatworthy accompanied his daughter, Barbara, on a tour of Europe and photographed the Matterhorn while there. In 1953, Clatworthy died in Estes Park at the age of 78.

== Legacy ==
In 2015, History Colorado announced that it had been awarded a National Historic Records and Publications Commission (a division of the National Archives and Records Administration) Access to Historical Records grant that would enable the institution to further process and catalog its holdings related to Fred Payne Clatworthy, as well as photographers David DeHarport, the Aultman Studio of Trinidad, Colorado, and Winter Prather.
