= Lee Friedlander =

American photographer (born 1934)

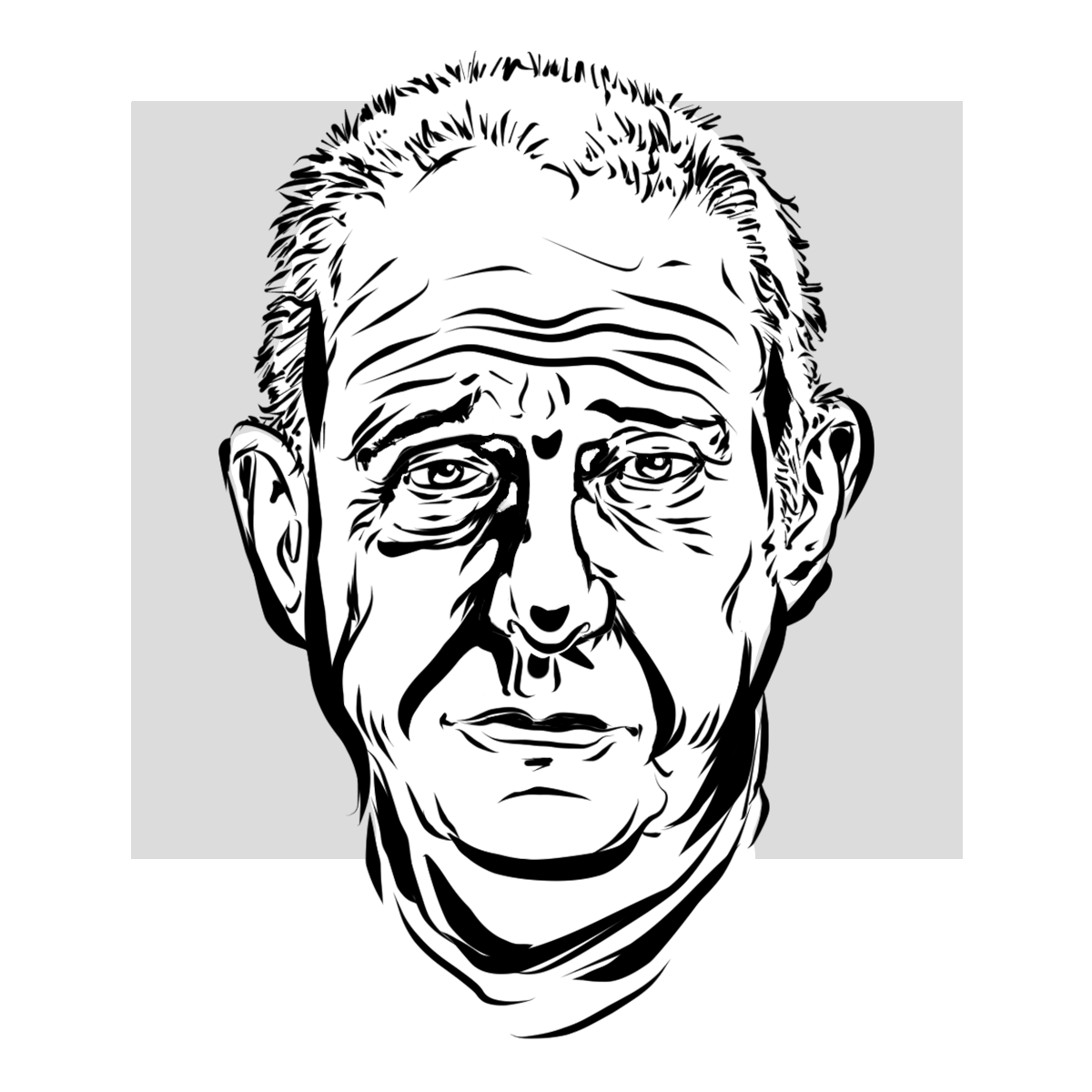
- Portrait of Lee Friedlander
- Born: July 14, 1934 (age 92); Aberdeen, Washington, U.S.
- Education: Art Center College of Design
- Spouse: Maria (m. 1958)

Lee Friedlander (/ˈfriːdlændər/; born July 14, 1934) is an American photographer and artist. In the 1960s and 1970s, Friedlander evolved an influential and often imitated visual language of urban "social landscape," with many of his photographs including fragments of store-front reflections, structures framed by fences, posters and street signs. His work is characterized by its innovative use of framing and reflection, often using the natural environment or architectural elements to frame his subjects. Over the course of his career, Friedlander has been the recipient of numerous awards and his work has been exhibited in major museums and galleries worldwide (Museum of Modern Art, New York, Corcoran Gallery of Art, National Gallery of Victoria, Melbourne).

== Life and work ==
Friedlander was born in Aberdeen, Washington, on July 14, 1934 to Kaari Nurmi (of Finnish descent) and Fritz (Fred) Friedlander (a German-Jewish émigré). His mother died of cancer when he was seven years old.

Already earning pocket-money as a photographer by age 14, he went on at the age of 18 to study photography at the Art Center College of Design in Pasadena, California. In 1956, he moved to New York City, where he photographed jazz musicians for record album covers. His early work was influenced by Eugène Atget, Robert Frank and Walker Evans. Friedlander is regarded as one of Atget's heirs. In 1960, Friedlander was awarded a Guggenheim Fellowship to focus on his art, and was awarded subsequent grants in 1962 and 1977. Some of his most famous photographs appeared in the September 1985 Playboy, black and white nude photographs of Madonna from the late 1970s. A student at the time, she was paid $25 for her 1979 set. In 2009, one of the images fetched $37,500 at a Christie's Art House auction.

Working primarily with hand-held Leica 35 mm cameras and black-and-white film, Friedlander's style has focused on the "social landscape." His photographs used detached images of urban life, store-front reflections, structures framed by fences, and posters and signs all combining to capture the look of "modern life."

In 1963, Nathan Lyons, assistant director and Curator of Photography at the International Museum of Photography at George Eastman House, mounted Friedlander's first solo exhibition. Friedlander was then a key figure in curator John Szarkowski's 1967 "New Documents" exhibition, at the Museum of Modern Art in New York along with Garry Winogrand and Diane Arbus. In 1973, his work was honored at the Rencontres d'Arles festival in France with the screening "Soirée américaine : Judy Dater, Jack Welpott, Jerry Uelsmann, Lee Friedlander" presented by Jean-Claude Lemagny. In 1990, the MacArthur Foundation awarded Friedlander a MacArthur Fellowship. In 2005, the Museum of Modern Art presented a major retrospective of Friedlander's career, including nearly 400 photographs since the 1950s; it was presented again in 2008 at the San Francisco Museum of Modern Art. In 2022, contemporary photographer Joseph Maida discussed Friedlander's work from the 1970s and 80's in Maida's monograph A Third Look,.

In 2023, Joel Coen curated an exhibition of 70 of Friedlander's photographs, which were shown (35 different photographs at each site) at the Fraenkel Gallery in San Francisco and in New York at Luhring Augustine.

While suffering from arthritis and housebound, he focused on photographing his surroundings. His book Stems reflects his life during the time of his knee replacement surgery. He has said that his "limbs" reminded him of plant stems.

Friedlander began photographing parks designed by Frederick Law Olmsted for a six-year commission from the Canadian Centre for Architecture in Montreal, beginning in 1988. After completing the commission he continued to photograph Olmsted-designed parks for 20 years in total. His series includes New York City's Central Park; Brooklyn's Prospect Park; Manhattan's Morningside Park; World's End in Hingham, Massachusetts; Cherokee Park in Louisville, Kentucky; and Niagara Falls State Park. On the occasion of the 150th anniversary of the design for Central Park, the Metropolitan Museum of Art held an exhibition of Friedlander's photographs of that park and a book was published, Photographs: Frederick Law Olmsted Landscapes. "

Friedlander works primarily with medium format cameras, such as the Hasselblad Superwide.

== Personal life ==
It has been claimed that Friedlander is "notoriously media shy," but he did grant an interview to The New York Times in April 2023, in which he discussed his work.

He married his wife, Maria, in 1958. She has been the subject of many of his portraits.

Their daughter Anna is married to photographer Thomas Roma. Their son Erik is a cellist and composer.

== Publications ==
- E.J. Bellocq: Storyville Portraits. Photographs from the New Orleans Red-Light District, Circa 1912. New York: Museum of Modern Art, 1970. With a preface by Friedlander.
- Self Portrait.
  - New City, NY: Self-published / Haywire Press, 1970.
  - New York: Distributed Art Publishers; San Francisco: Fraenkel Gallery, 1998. ISBN 1-881616-96-7. Revised edition. By Friedlander and John Szarkowski.
  - New York: Museum of Modern Art, 2005. ISBN 0-87070-338-2. With a preface by Friedlander and an afterword by John Szarkowski, "The Friedlander Self". According to the colophon, "This third edition retains the new material of the 1998 edition except in its design, which returns to that of the original book."
- The American Monument. New York: Eakins Press Foundation, 1976. ISBN 0-87130-043-5.
- Lee Friedlander Photographs. New City, NY: Self-published / Haywire Press, 1978.
- Factory Valleys: Ohio & Pennsylvania. New York: Callaway Editions, 1982. ISBN 0-935112-04-9.
- Lee Friedlander Portraits. Boston: Little, Brown, 1985. ISBN 0-8212-1602-3.
- Like a One-Eyed Cat: Photographs by Lee Friedlander, 1956–1987. New York: Harry N. Abrams in association with the Seattle Art Museum, 1989. ISBN 0-8109-1274-0.
- CRAY at Chippewa Falls: Photographs by Lee Friedlander, Cray Research, Inc., 1987. Library of Congress Catalog Card Number 86-73134
- Nudes. New York: Pantheon, 1991. ISBN 0-679-40484-8.
- The Jazz People of New Orleans. New York: Pantheon, 1992. ISBN 0-679-41638-2.
- Maria. Washington: Smithsonian, 1992. ISBN 1-56098-207-1.
- Letters from the People.
  - New York: Distributed Art Publishers, 1993. ISBN 1-881616-05-3.
  - London: Jonathan Cape, 1993. ISBN 9780224032957.
- Bellocq: Photographs from Storyville, the Red-Light District of New Orleans. New York: Random House, 1996. ISBN 0-679-44975-2.
- The Desert Seen. New York: Distributed Art Publishers, 1996. ISBN 1-881616-75-4.
- Viewing Olmsted: Photographs by Robert Burley, Lee Friedlander, and Geoffrey James. Montréal: Canadian Centre for Architecture, 1996. ISBN 0-920785-58-1. By Phyllis Lambert.
- American Musicians: Photographs by Lee Friedlander. New York: Distributed Art Publishers, 1998. ISBN 1-56466-056-7. By Friedlander, Steve Lacy, and Ruth Brown.
- Lee Friedlander. San Francisco: Fraenkel Gallery, 2000. ISBN 1-881337-09-X.
- Lee Friedlander at Work. New York: Distributed Art Publishers, 2002. ISBN 1-891024-48-5.
- Stems. New York: Distributed Art Publishers, 2003. ISBN 1-891024-75-2.
- Lee Friedlander: Sticks and Stones: Architectural America. San Francisco: Fraenkel Gallery, 2004. ISBN 1-891024-97-3. By Friedlander and James Enyeart.
- Friedlander. New York: Museum of Modern Art, 2005. ISBN 0-87070-343-9. By Peter Galassi.
- Cherry Blossom Time in Japan: The Complete Works. San Francisco: Fraenkel Gallery, 2006. ISBN 1-881337-20-0.
- Lee Friedlander: New Mexico. Santa Fe, NM: Radius Books, 2008. ISBN 978-1-934435-11-3. By Friedlander, Andrew Smith, and Emily Ballew Neff.
- Photographs: Frederick Law Olmsted Landscapes. New York: Distributed Art Publishers, 2008. ISBN 978-1933045733.
- America by Car. San Francisco: Fraenkel Gallery, 2010. ISBN 978-1-935202-08-0.
- Portraits: The Human Clay: Volume 1. New Haven, CT: Yale University, 2015. ISBN 978-0-300-21520-5.
- Children: The Human Clay: Volume 2. New Haven, CT: Yale University, 2015. ISBN 978-0-300-21519-9.
- Street: The Human Clay: Volume 3. New Haven, CT: Yale University, 2016. ISBN 978-0-300-22177-0.
- Lee Friedlander: Western Landscapes. New Haven, CT: Yale University Art Gallery, 2016. ISBN 978-0-300-22301-9.
- Head. Oakland, CA: TBW Books, 2017. Subscription Series #5, Book #4. ISBN 978-1-942953-28-9. Edition of 1000 copies. Friedlander, Mike Mandel, Susan Meiselas and Bill Burke each had one book in a set of four.

== Awards ==
- 1960: Guggenheim Fellowship from the John Simon Guggenheim Memorial Foundation.
- 1962: Guggenheim Fellowship from the John Simon Guggenheim Memorial Foundation.
- 1977: Guggenheim Fellowship from the John Simon Guggenheim Memorial Foundation.
- 1986: Edward MacDowell Medal, MacDowell Colony, Peterborough, NH.
- 1990: MacArthur Fellowship from the MacArthur Foundation.
- 2003: Special 150th Anniversary Medal and Honorary Fellowship (HonFRPS) from the Royal Photographic Society.
- 2005: Hasselblad Foundation International Award in Photography from the Hasselblad Foundation.
- 2006: Infinity Award for Lifetime Achievement from the International Center of Photography, New York.
- 2018: Lifetime Achievement, Lucie Awards.

== Exhibitions ==
=== Solo exhibitions ===
- 1963: George Eastman House, curated by Nathan Lyons. Friedlander's first solo exhibition.
- 1986: Cherry Blossom Time in Japan, Laurence Miller Gallery, New York City.
- 1988: Lee Friedlander: Cray at Chippewa Falls, Laurence Miller Gallery, New York City.
- 1989: Like a One-Eyed Cat: Photographs by Lee Friedlander 1956–1987, Laurence Miller Gallery, New York City.
- 1991: Lee Friedlander: A Selection of Nudes, Laurence Miller Gallery, New York City.
- 1991: Lee Friedlander: Work in Progress/Sonora Desert, Laurence Miller Gallery, New York City.
- 1993: Letters from the People: Photographs by Lee Friedlander, Canadian Centre for Architecture, Montreal.
- 2005: Friedlander, Museum of Modern Art, New York City.
- 2008: Friedlander, San Francisco Museum of Modern Art, San Francisco.
- 2008: America by Car, Fraenkel Gallery, San Francisco.
- 2008: Lee Friedlander: A Ramble in Olmsted Parks, Metropolitan Museum of Art, New York City. Organised by Jeff L. Rosenheim.
- 2010: America by Car, Whitney Museum of American Art, New York City.
- 2017: Lee Friedlander in Louisiana, New Orleans Museum of Art, New Orleans, LA.
- 2018: Lee Friedlander: American Musicians, New Orleans Museum of Art, New Orleans, LA.

=== Group exhibitions ===
- 1966: Toward a Social Landscape, George Eastman House, Rochester, NY. Photographs by Friedlander, Bruce Davidson, Danny Lyon, Duane Michals, and Garry Winogrand. Curated by Nathan Lyons.
- 1967: New Documents, Museum of Modern Art, New York. With Garry Winogrand and Diane Arbus, curated by John Szarkowski.
- 1996: Viewing Olmsted, Canadian Centre for Architecture, Montreal. Photographs by Robert Burley, Lee Friedlander, and Geoffrey James.
