= Syl Labrot =

American photographer and graphic artist

Sylvester Welch Labrot III (November 12, 1929 – July 14, 1977) was an American photographer, painter, and graphic artist. He was among a group of early art photographers associated with Minor White, including Walter Chappell and Nathan Lyons. He is best known for his abstract color photography, much of it done during the late 1950s, but also for his photographic art book, Pleasure Beach, produced towards the end of his life. His photographs and prints are in a number of museum collections including the Museum of Modern Art in New York City, the Art Institute of Chicago, and the George Eastman Museum in Rochester, New York. Much of his work is housed at the Visual Studies Workshop in Rochester.

Photographer Syl Labrot, photographed by his youngest son and later digitally reworked.

== Early life and education ==
Syl Labrot was born Sylvester Welch Labrot III on November 12, 1929, in New Orleans, Louisiana. Labrot was educated primarily in private schools on the East Coast, then studied political science at the University of Colorado Boulder. He became increasingly interested in photography, joining the local camera club and taking a New York Institute of Photography correspondence course.

== Career ==
Labrot started out as a commercial photographer selling work locally and nationally to calendar companies and magazines. After discovering Edward Weston's work, he began experimenting with creative photography. His commercial work had primarily been in color, and his interest in techniques of color printing soon led him to producing abstract color prints.

After having a show of his prints in Denver, Labrot wanted input from a wider range of photographers. He took a trip to the East Coast, where he showed some prints to Minor White. At that time, Nathan Lyons was curator and Walter Chappell had just started working there and it was at this point that the three developed a working relationship that led to their production of Under the Sun in early 1960, a book of photographs that included the work of all three. This early success and his desire to participate in a larger artistic community prompted his move to the east coast from Colorado in 1957.

In 1960, Edward Steichen, the photography curator for the Museum of Modern Art in New York City, acquired Labrot's prints for the museum. These appeared in an exhibition of new acquisitions. Later that year Labrot's photographs appeared in another exhibit, The Sense of Abstraction, at MoMA. Labrot’s work was exhibited in several exhibitions at MoMA during the 1960s.

In 1971, Labrot joined the faculty of the Visual Studies Workshop, an independent photography school founded by Nathan Lyons in Rochester, New York. He taught graphic arts there until 1975. During this period, he began working with various printmaking techniques. After he left the Visual Studies Workshop in 1975, he focused on producing the photography book, Pleasure Beach: A Book of Photography (1976).

In a 1977 memorial piece for Labrot in Exposure, photographer and art photography historian Arnold Gassan described the evolution of Labrot’s work, his focus on color, and the various techniques he employed. He concludes with a detailed description and assessment of Labrot’s final work.

Labrot died of cancer at the age of 47 on July 14, 1977, at his home in New York City during the blackout. The New York Times posted a brief obituary.

== Collections ==
Labrot’s photographs and prints are in museum collections including the Museum of Modern Art in New York City, the Art Institute of Chicago, and the George Eastman Museum in Rochester, New York. Much of his work is housed at the Visual Studies Workshop in Rochester.

== Selected works ==
- Under the Sun: The Abstract Art of Camera Vision (1960), with Walter Chappell and Nathan Lyons
- Pleasure Beach: A Book of Photography (1976)
