= David DeHarport =

American photographer and anthropologist

David Lee DeHarport (1921–2001) was a photographer and anthropologist primarily known for his photographic work in Colorado's eastern plains region and his archaeological survey work of Arizona's Canyon de Chelly National Monument. Born on August 8, 1921, David DeHarport was raised in Denver, Colorado. He attended the University of Denver and studied photography and anthropology. After earning his B.A. in 1943, DeHarport received a Master's in anthropology in 1945.

After graduation, he started a PhD at Harvard University. The Peabody Museum sponsored DeHarport to work at Canyon de Chelly National Monument during his PhD candidacy. He spent the summers of 1948-1951 and 1957-1959 surveying the Monument. DeHarport would later go on to write a four volume dissertation entitled, "An Archeological Survey of Canyon de Chelly," based on data gathered 367 sites in Canyon de Chelly. It included 2,600 photographs of petroglyphs that DeHarport started taking in 1959 with a Leica 35mm camera.

DeHarport held numerous jobs that would inform his later work. In 1953, he photographed low-relief sculpture at Chichen Itza, in the Yucatán Peninsula, in Mexico with the Carnegie Institute. In 1955, DeHaport again put his doctoral studies at Harvard on hold to spend several months photographing sites in India's Ajanta Caves on behalf of UNESCO.

After completing his PhD, DeHarport took a position with the Navajo Claims Commission in Winslow, Arizona. In 1962, DeHarport began work as a research associate at the Museum of Northern Arizona, during which time he returned to Canyon de Chelly to document archaeological sites.

In 1963, DeHarport dedicated himself full-time to art photography, chiefly shooting the landscapes of the Southwest. In the early 1980s, he began working with fellow photographer, Bill O'Connor, to document all of Canyon de Chelly's rock art in both black-and-white and color. This project continued into the early 1990s, and the two photographers mounted exhibitions of their work at the Denver Art Museum and Denver's Native American Trading Company. During the late 1980s, DeHarport's interest also turned toward eastern Colorado, a subject close to the photographer's heart. The DeHarport family had lived on the Eastern Plains for nearly 100 years. In the late 1980s, DeHarport and fellow photographer, Marscha Winterfield, began exploring and photographing the towns and landscapes of the region. These efforts culminated in "Last Chance to Cope." Winterfield and DeHarport hoped this series would draw more attention to Colorado's plains region, an area of Colorado that the artists felt was often overlooked in favor of the state's mountainous regions. DeHarport dedicated the rest of his life to fine art photography.

David DeHarport died in Colorado in 2001. His manuscript and photograph collections were donated to various institutions including the Museum of Northern Arizona in Flagstaff, Arizona and the History Colorado Center in Denver, Colorado. In 2015, History Colorado announced that it had been awarded a National Historic Records and Publications Commission (a division of the National Archives and Records Administration) Access to Historical Records grant that would enable the institution to further process and catalog its holdings related to David DeHarport, as well as photographers Winter Prather, Fred Payne Clatworthy, and the Aultman Studio of Trinidad, Colorado.
