= Aultman House =

- U.S. National Register of Historic Places
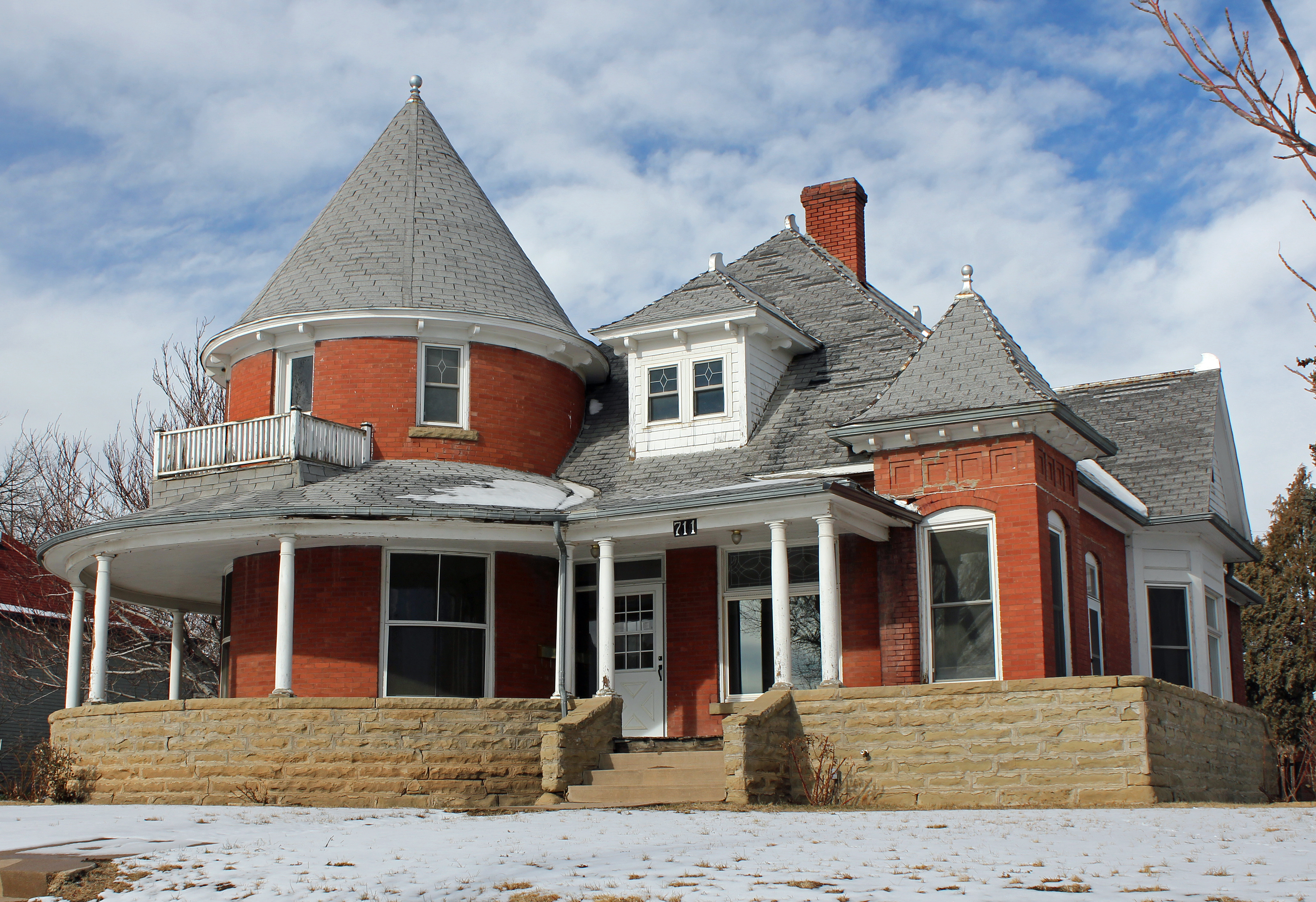

- Location within Colorado
- Location: 711 Colorado Ave., Trinidad, Colorado
- Coordinates: 37°10′31″N 104°30′59″W
- Area: less than one acre
- Built: 1905
- Built by: Crouch & Smith
- Architectural style: Queen Anne
- NRHP reference No.: 07000673
- Added to NRHP: July 11, 2007

The Aultman House, at 711 Colorado Ave. in Trinidad, Colorado, was built in 1905. It was listed on the National Register of Historic Places in 2007.

It is a one-and-a-half-story Queen Anne-style house, one of three Queen Annes at the intersection of Colorado Ave. and Willow St. in Trinidad.

It was home of Oliver E. Aultman (1866-1953), a commercial photographer who was a 'pioneer Trinidad photographer'.

== See also ==
- Aultman Studio
- National Register of Historic Places listings in Las Animas County, Colorado
