= Aultman Studio =

American former photographic studio

The Aultman Studio was a commercial photographic studio that operated from 1889-2000 in Trinidad, Colorado. It is considered to be one of the longest running photography studios in Colorado.

== History ==
Oliver E. Aultman (1867-1953), a bank clerk and transplant from Missouri, began the Aultman Studio after repossessing the business from J.F. Cook. Aultman had initially granted Cook, a fellow newcomer to Trinidad, a $1500 loan to get a photography studio up and running. Instead of repaying Aultman, Cook defaulted on the loan and fled to Ohio. To recoup his losses, Aultman opened the studio himself in October 1889.

Aultman taught himself photography and began to take customers. In 1892, Aultman bought out Dana B. Chase (1848-1897), a competitor who had been in business since the 1880s. Oliver set up his brother, Ira Everett Aultman (1873-1952), as the operator of Chase’s studio. He also purchased the studio of Daniel Desmond (1853-1940) that same year and installed his other brother, Otis Aultman (1874-1943), as its head. Ira Aultman did not stick with the photography business for long. However, Otis Aultman's “Otis Studio” operated in Trinidad for the next 15 years. In 1907, Otis Aultman hopped a train bound for El Paso, Texas and left Trinidad, never to return. In El Paso, Otis Aultman found employment as a news photographer and became known for his images of the Mexican Revolution. He was rumored to be a favorite of Pancho Villa, who nicknamed him the "Banty Rooster." He worked as a commercial photographer in El Paso until his death in 1943.

While Aultman Studio was mostly known for its studio portraits, Oliver Aultman also took commercial work. For instance, in 1901, Aultman was hired by a Denver entrepreneur, Frank H Summeril (1866-1923), to photograph a steamboat journey in Utah. Summeril's steamboat, the Undine, launched from Green River, Utah and traveled down the Green River to where it met the Colorado River. Then the boat steamed up the Colorado River to Moab, Utah. Summeril eventually came to financial ruin, and Aultman was never compensated for his work. However, when asked about the expedition, Aultman claimed it was one of the most pleasant experiences he ever had with a camera.

Also, in 1901, Aultman hired a young woman, Susan Jane Rowland Snodgrass (1875-1961), known as “Jennie,” as a receptionist and hand-colorist. Aultman and Snodgrass were married in 1902 and had one son, Glenn Aultman (1904-2000). He would later work alongside his parents in the studio. After high school, Glenn Aultman attended the Anderson Business College of Trinidad. In 1925, he formally joined his father at the Aultman Studio as a darkroom assistant. After Oliver Aultman suffered a stroke in 1952, Glenn Aultman took over the business and remained its chief photographer for the next fifty years. In 2007, the National Register of Historic Places listed the Aultman House.

== Aultman Studio photographs collection ==
In 1965, Glenn Aultman moved from the family home on 711 Colorado Avenue in Trinidad to live in the Aultman Studio. He sold nearly 35,000 Aultman Studio negatives to the Colorado Historical Society at this time. In 1988, Lance and Lou Wheeland of Trinidad established an Aultman Museum to function as a permanent home for the studio's photographic work and the Aultman family's personal papers and effects. In 1990, The Aultman Museum merged with the A.R. Mitchell Western Art Museum with both collections sharing the historic Jamieson Building on East Main Street in Trinidad. Glenn Aultman died in 2000.

The Aultman Studio's photographic archives are currently housed at the History Colorado Center in Denver, Colorado. In 2015, History Colorado announced that it had been awarded a National Historic Records and Publications Commission (a division of the National Archives and Records Administration) Access to Historical Records grant that would enable the institution to further process and catalog its holdings related to the Aultman Studio, as well as the work of photographers David DeHarport, Winter Prather, and Fred Payne Clatworthy.
