= Dye-transfer process =

Photographic printing process

Dye transfer is a continuous-tone color photographic printing process. It was used to print Technicolor films, as well as to produce paper colour prints used in advertising, or large transparencies for display.

== History ==
The use of dye imbibition for making full-color prints from a set of black-and-white photographs taken through different color filters was first proposed and patented by Charles Cros in 1880. It was commercialized by Edward Sanger-Shepherd, who in 1900 was marketing kits for making color prints on paper and slides for projection.

Imbibition printing was initially in monochrome. The basic underlying principle is that bichromate development of a silver gelatin photographic emulsion (not strictly a real chemical emulsion) results in the gelatin being differentially tanned or hardened in proportion to the exposure received, and blackening obtained. When washed in hot water a relief gelatin image is obtained which is then immersed in a dye bath, washed off in a 3% acetic acid solution (one liter for a 16 x 20 inch print to remove excess dye) then to the 1% acetic acid holding bath. Photographic paper was removed from the conditioner (mordant bath) and matrix was rolled into contact with photographic paper consisting of a paper base, a baryta coating to improve light reflectance and a gelatin coating without the light-sensitive silver salts in regular photographic bromide paper. The gelatin absorbs dye from the matrix (which is the same size as the print). Finally, the print is dried between blotters, or by heat.

The color process depends on superimposing three images in the subtractive colors: cyan, magenta and yellow in exact register, facilitated by means of register pins mounted at the edge of a glass rolling bed, using a purpose designed punch to make holes at the edge of the matrix films. As three matrices are required for each print, which are the same size as the print, the process is relatively expensive. Colour separation negatives together with their high contrast highlight masks that keep specular highlights clear from fogging over by exposing the contrast reducing masks through them.

Technicolor introduced dye transfer in its Process 3, introduced in the feature film The Viking (1928), which was produced by the Technicolor Corporation and released by Metro-Goldwyn-Mayer. Technicolor's two previous systems were an additive color process and a physically problematic subtractive color process, the latter requiring two prints cemented together back-to-back. Process 3 used an imbibition process pioneered by the Handschiegl color process, which had been created in 1916 for Cecil B. DeMille's feature film Joan the Woman (1917). Technicolor further refined the imbibition dye transfer process in its Process 4, introduced in 1932, which employed three simultaneously filmed negatives. Gone with the Wind and The Wizard of Oz, both released in 1939, employed Technicolor.

In the 1940s, Jeannette Klute helped popularize dye transfer printing at Eastman Kodak for graphic arts and still photo work. Motion picture use of dye transfer remained associated with to Technicolor which used dye imbibition for its color films, while relying on Kodak to produce light-sensitive film and receiver film. The dye transfer process was also sometimes known as "dye imbibition" printing and used gelatin relief matrices created through a wash-off process.

While technicolor live action movies ended in 1954, the dye-transfer process would continue to be used for another twenty years for films shot with the single-negative Eastmancolor process.

== Process ==
The graphic arts process requires making three printing matrices from three color separation negatives made from a color transparency original or at one time directly in a large format camera fitted with a sliding plate holder or film holder (to minimize camera movement when changing regular plate holders). The matrices, which are relief gelatin images on a film support (one for each subtractive primary color) absorb dye in proportion to the optical densities of the gelatin relief image. Successive placement of the dyed film matrices, one at a time, "transfers" each primary dye by physical contact from the matrix to a mordanted, gelatin-coated paper. It would take a technician one whole day to produce one print.

Firstly, three color separation negatives were made using three high contrast highlight masks to produce three contrast reducing and color correction unsharp masks. The unsharp masks were made with an oblique light source (and a clear film as a spacer, the contact frame exposed while rotating on a gramophone turntable). The original was either a miniature 6 x 6 cm or 35 mmm color transparency, or else a large format 5 x 7 or 8 x 10 inch color transparency. Three separation negatives were made on panchromatic film exposing the color transparency through a red, green and blue filter that would eventually print in the subtractive dyes: cyan, magenta and yellow respectively. The red separation negative was exposed onto panchromatic film through the red unsharp mask. The green separation negative was also exposed through the red unsharp mask. The blue separation negative was exposed through the green unsharp mask. The purpose of the contrast reducing masks was to reduce the contrast range of the original transparencies to a level that could be handled by reflected copy material. By swapping the masks, color correction was achieved to compensate for deficiencies in the dyes.

The 8 x 10 separation negatives were placed in an enlarger to expose the printing matrices. These were developed in plastic developing trays, and when fixed were washed in hot water to remove unexposed gelatin. After drying in a room with a fan heater, each matrix was placed in a dye bath: the red matrix in cyan; the green matrix in magenta, and the blue matrix in yellow dye. Before being rolled into contact with the mordanted paper with a gelatin surface, the first matrix was lifted out of the cyan dye bath and allowed to drain until the stream of dye broke into drops. It was then placed into a plastic developing dish and one liter of 3% acetic acid. The dish was vigorously rocked back and forth and side to side to wash off the dye on the surface of the matrix. The matrix was lifted clear of the solution once so as to allow the acetic acid solution to reach the back of the matrix film.

To facilitate registration, a special punch with pairs of matching register pins: one round on the left and a squarish pin on the right; both pins mounted at the edge of a glass rolling bed. The paper was placed on the glass rolling bed gelatin surface up. The matrix held by one short edge high in the air while the left (round) hole fitted onto the register pin, and then the right (squarish) hole pressed down onto the pin. Then a rubber roller is taken and the matrix firmly rolled away from the operator into contact with the paper which is kept in a pile in a conditioning bath. The dye is absorbed by the paper for one minute after which the matrix is picked up by the farthermost corners and peeled off the paper. The same procedure is followed for the magenta and yellow matrices.

== Notable practitioners ==
The following photographers employed the dye transfer printing process for artistic purposes.

- Marie Cosindas
- William Eggleston
- Ernst Haas
- Syl Labrot
- Helen Levitt
- Dennis Marsico
- Eliot Porter
- Sandy Skoglund
- Pete Turner

== Status today ==
In 1994, Eastman Kodak stopped making all materials for this process. The dyes used in the process are very spectrally pure compared to normal coupler-induced photographic dyes, with the exception of the Kodak cyan. The dyes have excellent light and dark fastness. The dye transfer process possesses a larger color gamut and tonal scale than any other process, including inkjet. Another important characteristic of dye transfer is that it allows the practitioner the highest degree of photographic control compared to any other photochemical color print process.

A peculiar advantage of the process was that skilled dye transfer retouchers would use the same dyes the image was printed with to fill in blank white spaces between two or three separate color photographs such as a background shot (rocks and a waterfall) one or more human figures, and more often than not a product shot (a cigarette pack) to produce a "strip in". Using the same dyes for photographically printing the images and for retouching meant that color matching by eye would not show up differently when re-photographed.
