= Walter Chappell =

American photographer and poet

- Born: Walter Landon Chappell; June 8, 1925; Portland, Oregon, U.S.
- Died: August 8, 2000 (aged 75); Santa Fe, New Mexico, U.S.
- Education: Ellison-White Conservatory
- Occupation: Photographer
- Spouses: Patricia Schmid (m. 1956; died 1959); Suzanne Lechau (m. 1977; div. 1984)
- Children: 6

Walter Landon Chappell (June 8, 1925 – August 8, 2000) was an American photographer and poet, primarily known for his black and white photography of landscapes, nature, and the human body.

== Early life ==
Chappell was born in Portland, Oregon, in 1925, the son of a contralto mother who was a singer with the Portland Symphony Choir. His father was a train engineer, and was of part-Native American descent, descending from the Umatilla people. Chappell spent his early life on the Umatilla Indian Reservation in northeastern Oregon, until the family returned to Portland when he was three years old. Chappell attended Benson Polytechnic High School, and studied musical composition at the Ellison-White Conservatory of Music.

== Career ==
Fern (1974) by Chappell. Silver gelatin print.

Chappell was a constant presence in American black and white imagery among other noted photographers Minor White, Alfred Stieglitz, and Edward Weston, with whom he studied. Chappell was curator of prints and exhibitions at the George Eastman House in Rochester, New York, from 1957 to 1961 and was affiliated with Aperture Magazine founded by Minor White in 1952.

Chappell left the George Eastman House in 1961, to settle in Wingdale, New York, with noted painter and artist, Nancy Chappell (then Nancy Barrett Dickinson). Soon after building their home, a fire destroyed their house and nearly all of Chappell's photographic work to date, including photographic negatives and their corresponding prints. In the early 1960s, he was a co-founder of a group of seven photographers who called themselves "The Heliographers": Chappell, Paul Caponigro, Carl Chiarenza, William Clift, Marie Cosindas, Nicholas Dean, Paul Petricone. Although most of them were affiliated with the Carl Siembad Gallery in Boston, Chappell proposed to open a gallery in New York City that he ran for the group: The Heliographers' Gallery Archive opened its doors in 1963 at 859 Lexington Avenue. The gallery closed in 1965.

Chappell re-located to San Francisco where he became re-acquainted with Minor White and joined a circle of photographers that included Imogen Cunningham and Ansel Adams. After recuperating from tuberculosis in Denver, Colorado, he studied with the photographer Winter Prather, a photographic technician in the printing process.

Walter Chappell traveled extensively during his career. Following a relocation to Big Sur, California, where he was commissioned by MGM to photograph Sharon Tate, Elizabeth Taylor, and Richard Burton, his growing interest in the imagery of the human form in nature and experimental film-making instigated a move to Taos, New Mexico, to photograph the human form and the expansive landscape of the Southwest. He continued to study Native American ceremonial life and became intimately connected with the Taos Pueblo.

After still another move to San Francisco where he lived from 1970–74, he began experimental work with electron photography: high voltage/high frequency electron imagery of living plants. Fern, in te collection of the Honolulu Museum of Art, is an example of these electron photographs. This work was presented in his Metaflora Portfolio in 1980. Chappell continued his photographic exploration of electron photography in Hilo, Hawaii, in 1984 after being awarded the National Endowment for the Arts Photographer's Fellowship for the third time (1977, 1980, 1984). Chappell moved to his final residence in the remote village of El Rito, New Mexico, in 1987 and from there continued to exhibit, lecture, give workshops and make field trips. In 1989 he was given access to and use of one of the famous 20x24" Polaroid view-cameras.

Chappell has a significant representation of works in collections at: the Museum of Modern Art (New York, New York); the International Museum of Photography at George Eastman House (Rochester, New York); Library of Congress (Washington, D.C.); Museum of Art, Stanford University (Palo Alto, California); Metro Goldwyn Mayer Studio (Culver City, California) among many others.

== Death ==
Chappell died of lung cancer on August 8, 2000, in Santa Fe, New Mexico, aged 75. He was remembered by The Los Angeles Times as, "a maverick and pioneer in the world of art photography who focused his attention--and his camera--on the wonders of plant life, natural forms and the human body."
