= Environmental portrait =

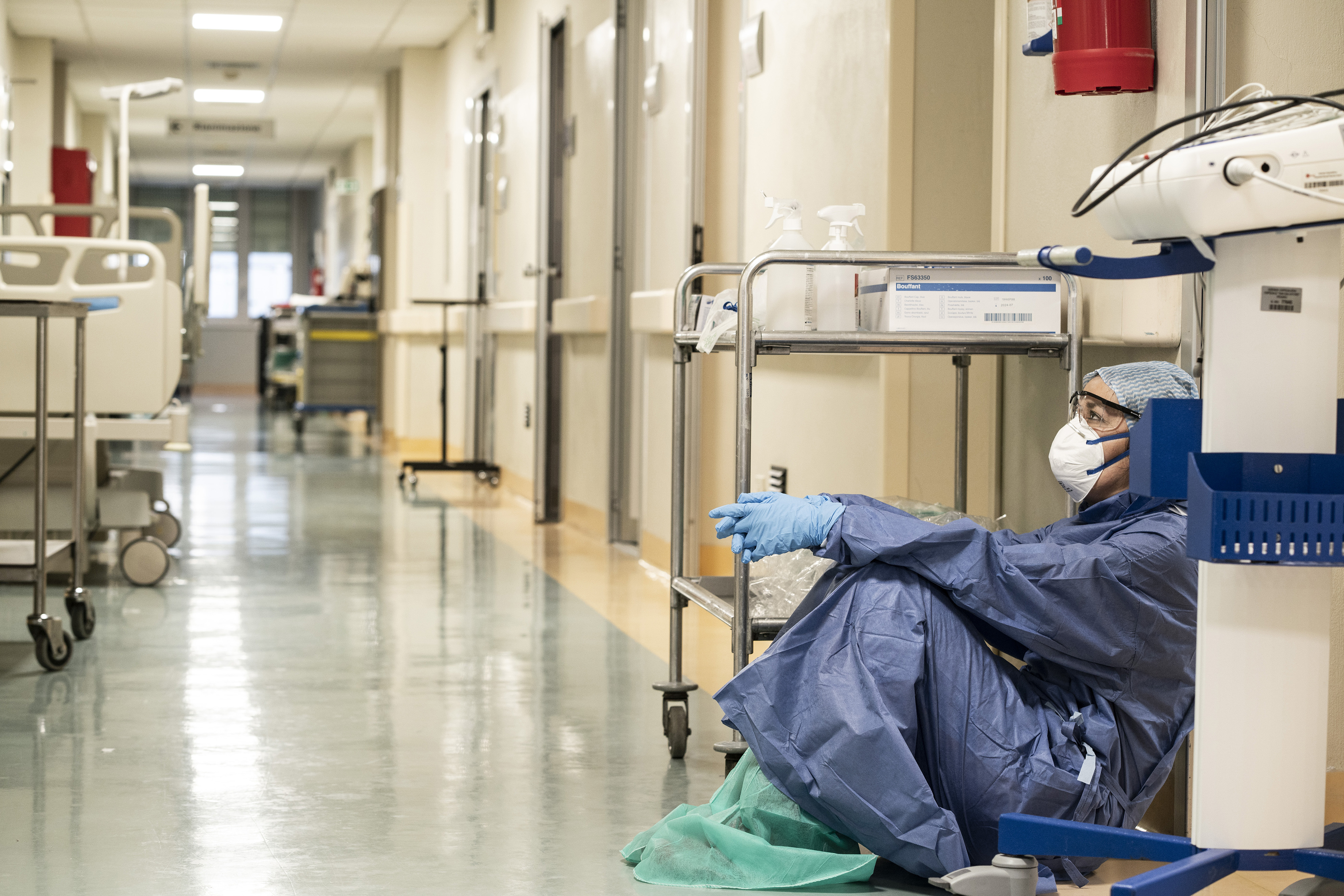
Environmental portrait of a health care worker during the COVID-19 pandemic in a hospital in Italy

An environmental portrait is a portrait executed in the subject's usual environment, such as in their home or workplace, and typically illuminates the subject's life and surroundings. The term is most frequently used of a genre of photography.

By photographing a person in their natural surroundings, it is thought that you will be able to better illuminate their character, and therefore portray the essence of their personality, rather than merely a likeness of their physical features. It is also thought that by photographing a person in their natural surroundings, the subject will be more at ease, and so be more conducive to expressing themselves, as opposed to in a studio, which can be a rather intimidating and artificial experience.

== The background in environmental portraits ==
The surroundings or background is a key element in environmental portraiture, and is used to convey further information about the person being photographed.

Where it is common in studio portraiture and even in location candid photography to shoot using a shallow depth of field, thereby throwing the background out of focus, the background in environmental portraiture is an integral part of the image. Indeed, small apertures and great depth of field are commonly used in this type of photography.

=== Details in the surroundings ===
While it is often true that the background may dominate the subject, this need not necessarily be so. In fact, the details that convey the message from the surroundings can often be quite small and still be significant. The key seems to be in the symbolism expressed by various elements in the background; for instance, a baseball cap may not tell you much about your subject (unless he or she is a baseball player), but a chef's hat gives you a lot more detail about who he is and what he does.

=== Pet environmental portraits ===
Environmental portraiture is also now a popular style adopted by those working in the field of pet photography. This is because pet portraits also benefit from the subject being seen in context or in relaxed surroundings at home.
