= Joseph Maida =

American film director

- Born: Philadelphia, Pennsylvania
- Education: Columbia College, Yale University
- Known for: Photography
- Notable work: New Natives (2013); Things R Queer (2018); Born Free and Equal (2018)

Joseph Maida is an artist, writer and educator. Best known for his photography, Maida's work is a visual representation of the intersections between identity and culture. Maida's most significant projects include New Natives; Things R Queer; and Born Free and Equal: The Story of Loyal ________-Americans. Maida earned an MFA from Yale University in 2001 and currently serves as chair of the BFA Photography and Video Department at School of Visual Arts (SVA).

== Early life and education ==
Maida graduated summa cum laude from Columbia College in 1999 with a Bachelor of Arts in architecture and a specialization in art history. In 2001, Maida earned a Master of Fine Arts from Yale University, where they/he studied under Philip-Lorca diCorcia and Catherine Opie.

== Work ==
While at Yale, Maida began exploring video for their/his graduate thesis. Soon after graduation from Yale University, Maida began displaying both photo and video work in group and solo exhibits nationally and abroad.

In 2013, New Natives was shown at Daniel Cooney Fine Art in New York City. The gallery exhibition marked a midpoint in a series of portraits made in Hawaii between 2010 and 2015 of male-identifying, Hawaiian-born aspiring models. Maida sourced models through social media, thus acknowledging contemporary changes in the relationship between the local and the global. New Natives explored identity, gender, sexuality, and ethnicity within the complexity of Hawaii's unique culture and history. A monograph of New Natives was published by L'Artiere (Bologna, Italy) in 2015. In 2018, Maida's series Things R Queer punctuated the publication of Feast for the Eyes: The Story of Food in Photography, by Susan Bright. Their/his brightly colored still-life photographs of strange dioramas made entirely of food garnered the attention of both modern platforms such as Instagram as well as traditional modes of gallery and print exhibition. That same year, soon after the enactment of Donald Trump's Executive Order 13769, known as the Muslim Ban, Maida's book Born Free and Equal: The Story of Loyal ________-Americans was published. It revisited a book of words and images of the Manzanar Japanese internment camp in California by Ansel Adams. Born Free and Equal was a contemporary perspective of Adam's work that paralleled historical events with that of the current day. Maida continues to work on personal art and writing projects while teaching at a collegiate level.

== Exhibitions ==
=== Photography ===
Maida's photographic work has been widely shown in solo and group exhibitions throughout the United States, Europe, and Asia. Venues include the Museo Nacional Centro de Arte Reina Sofía, Madrid; Kunsthalle Wien; Witte de With, Rotterdam; C/O Berlin; Photographers' Gallery, London; Foam Fotografiemuseum Amsterdam; and the International Center of Photography (ICP), New York. Interior Portraits, Maida's first solo exhibition at Wallspace New York City in 2002 explored expressions of individuals' interior selves through the interior spaces they occupied. New York Times Art Critic, Ken Johnson wrote, "hanging around the homes of his friends, Mr. Maida captures images of people in relaxed, unposed and unguarded moments." Maida's first international show, Dream Factory was exhibited at the Nikon Salon, first in Tokyo and then in Osaka, Japan in 2010. Dream Factory was the culmination of the time that Maida had spent in Japan as a recipient of the Japan U.S. Friendship Commission Grant, granted in 2007 by the National Endowment for the Arts.

Selected solo and group photo and/or video exhibitions

- 2002 Queens Museum of Art, Queens, New York
- 2002 Philadelphia Art Alliance, Philadelphia, Pennsylvania
- 2002 Wallspace, New York, New York
- 2004 Museum of Sex, New York, New York
- 2005 Centro de Arte de Sevilla, Seville, Spain
- 2006 Museo Nacional Centro de Arte Reina Sofía, Madrid, Spain
- 2007 Witte de With Contemporary Art Center, Rotterdam, The Netherlands
- 2007 Kyoto International House, Kyoto, Japan
- 2007 Bronx Museum of Art, Bronx, New York
- 2008 AKTA, Tokyo, Japan
- 2009 Kunsthalle Wien, Vienna, Austria
- 2010 Nikon Salon, Osaka, Japan
- 2010 Nikon Salon, Tokyo, Japan
- 2013 Daniel Cooney Fine Art, New York, New York
- 2015 University of Hawaiʻi Art Gallery, Honolulu, Hawaii
- 2016 Leslie-Lohman Museum of Art, New York, New York
- 2017 403 International Art Center, Wuhan, China
- 2018 Yancey Richardson Gallery, New York, New York
- 2018-21 Traveling Exhibition Feast for the Eyes: The Story of Food in Photography exhibited at The Photographers' Gallery, London, UK; Foam Fotografiemuseum Amsterdam; C/O Berlin; and The Polygon Gallery, North Vancouver, British Columbia, CA.

=== Video and film ===
For their/his MFA thesis at Yale, Maida made the short film Hot Shots. By deconstructing footage taken by their/his brother of two fraternity brothers at a college party, Maida explored how the intimacy of their relationship developed through increased intoxication.

Selected video and film screenings

- 2003 Moscow International Film Festival, Moscow, Russia; St. Petersburg, Russia; Vilnius, Lithuania
- 2004 Fylkingen, Stockholm, Sweden
- 2007 International Short Film Festival Oberhausen, Oberhausen, Germany
- 2016 Video Revival, Brooklyn, New York

== Teaching ==
Between 2002 and 2026, Maida was a faculty member in the BFA Photography and Video program at the School of Visual Arts in Manhattan. Between 2006 and 2011, he also taught photography, with a focus on Gender Studies, at Parsons School of Design in New York City. In 2011, he returned to Yale as a lecturer until 2013 and then spent a year as a lecturer at State University of New York at Purchase, New York. In 2015, Maida served as a visiting critic at the University of Hawaiʻi in Honolulu. In 2018, he was appointed as the Chair of the BFA Photography and Video Department until 2026.

== Publications ==
- 2015 New Natives, L'Artiere Edizioni, Bologna, Italy, ISBN 9788887569551
- 2018 Born Free and Equal: The Story of Loyal ________-Americans, Convoke, New York, ISBN 978-0-9997821-7-0

== Recognition ==
- 2004 PDN30: Emerging photographers to Watch Award, Photo District News
- 2007 Joan Mitchell Foundation Grant
- 2007 Artist-in-Residency with Thomas Struth, Atlantic Center for the Arts, New Smyrna Beach, Florida
- 2007 Artist in the Marketplace Fellowship (AIM), Bronx Museum of Art, Bronx New York
- 2008 National Endowment for the Arts (NEA) / JUSFC Creative Artist Fellowship
