= Nathan Lyons =

American photographer

Nathan Lyons (January 10, 1930 – August 31, 2016) was an American photographer, curator, and educator. He exhibited his photographs from 1956 onwards, produced books of his own and edited those of others.

Lyons was also a curator of photography and an associate director at the George Eastman House in Rochester, New York and, in 1969, founded the independent Visual Studies Workshop in Rochester, which established a course of study relating to the history and practice of the photographic art form and curatorial studies specifically pertaining to the medium of photography. He started the Society for Photographic Education, becoming its first chairman. He was involved with various magazines, being assistant editor of Image, regional editor of Aperture, and founder of Afterimage.

In 2000 Lyons received the International Center of Photography's Infinity Award for Lifetime Achievement in photography. He died on 31 August 2016, aged 86.

== Education and military service ==
In 1945 Lyons became interested in photography after viewing a darkroom demonstration and he began to photograph with a plastic Falcon camera while working in his family's glass and mirror business. In 1947 he received a camera as a graduation gift and between 1947 and 1948 he photographed around Times Square, New York and assisted various photographers. From 1948 to 1950 Lyons enrolled at Technical College at Alfred, Alfred, New York where he studied business and marketing. In 1950 he enlisted in the United States Air Force as a photographer and reported to Grenier Air Force Base in Manchester, New Hampshire. Between 1951 and 1953 he served as senior photographer in a photo intelligence unit in Kimpo, Korea.

In 1953 Lyons returned to the United States and worked for the Air Force as a staff news writer and public relations photographer in Marietta, Georgia. In 1954 following honorable discharge from the Air Force he returned to Alfred University where he majored in English literature and minored in theatre. He also studied photography and exhibition design with the artist John Wood who became his primary mentor and an influential force behind Lyons's creative practice.

== Curatorial work ==
After graduating in 1957, Lyons began working for the George Eastman House as the director of public information and assistant editor of Image magazine. In 1960 he was appointed assistant director and began a series of exhibitions on the work of young contemporary photographers. At this time he was also named the regional editor of Aperture magazine.

In 1961 Lyons curated the exhibition "Seven Contemporary Photographers" that included the work of Ralph Eugene Meatyard and Ray K. Metzker. Lyons gave Lee Friedlander his first solo exhibition in 1963. Lyons's curatorial aim was to promote the notion of a photographer's distinct "point of view" and individual creative motivations. Additionally, Lyons validated and defined the "snapshot aesthetic" in his exhibition "Toward a Social Landscape" in 1966 that included the work of Bruce Davidson, Lee Friedlander, Danny Lyon, Duane Michals and Garry Winogrand and further explored the aesthetic in his lecture "Photography and the Picture Experience" regarding the snapshot as "authentic picture form." Lyons also organized the exhibitions The Persistence of Vision,, 1967, Photography in the Twentieth Century, 1967, and Vision and Expression, 1969 at George Eastman House.

In 1962, "recognizing the growing importance of photography at museums and university art departments, he organized a conference for curators and teachers that evolved into the Society for Photographic Education. The Society for Photographic Education is a nonprofit membership organization that provides a forum for the discussion of photography and related media as a means of creative expression and cultural insight. In 1969 Lyons resigned from George Eastman House and founded Visual Studies Workshop. Three years later he founded Afterimage, a play on Image magazine published by George Eastman House. In 1983 he organized Oracle, an annual meeting of curators and directors of photographic institutions. He was a founding trustee of the New York Foundation for the Arts (NYFA) and served as chair from 1976 to 1993.

In 2008 he organized the retrospective exhibition John Wood: On the Edge of Clear Meaning, held at the International Center of Photography.

== Lyons's own photography ==
In 1960 Lyons published the book Under the Sun: The Abstract Art of Camera Vision along with the artists Syl Labrot and Walter Chappell. An exhibition of works by all three artists accompanied the book and was displayed at the Poindexter Gallery, New York. Six of Lyons's photographs were also included in the exhibition The Sense of Abstraction in Contemporary Photography at the Museum of Modern Art (MoMA), New York.

In 1964 Lyons's photographs were included in the exhibition The Photographer's Eye at MoMA and the exhibition Photography in the Fine Arts IV at the Metropolitan Museum of Art, New York. In 1971 Lyons exhibited Notations in Passing, 1970: Photographs by Nathan Lyons from the Collection of the National Gallery of Canada, Ottawa.

He published his first major book Notations in Passing: Visualized by Nathan Lyons in 1974. This book is the first instance of Lyons's creative exploration of the extended meaning forged from reading his photographs as diptychs contained within a larger sequence. In 1978 one of his images was included in the seminal exhibition "Mirrors and Windows" at MoMA. In 1987 he exhibited an early version of this series called Verbal Landscape at the Albright Knox Art Gallery. His work was also included in the exhibition, Photography and Art; Interactions since 1945 at the Los Angeles County Museum of Art.

The series Riding First Class on the Titanic! was completed in 1999 and the works exhibited in various public institutions and museums including the Addison Gallery of American Art, Andover, MA. The first major retrospective of his work, Nathan Lyons: A Survey, 1957–2000 was held at George Eastman House.

In 2001 Lyons retired from Visual Studies Workshop and began his series After 9/11, which he completed in 2003. In 2006 he exhibited his three completed series: Notations in Passing, Riding First Class on the Titanic! and After 9/11 in the exhibition, "Trilogy" at Bruce Silverstein Gallery, New York.

In 2011 he published a text-image collaboration with the poet Marvin Bell entitled Whiteout. In 2013 he completed his fourth publication, Return Your Mind to Its Upright Position and exhibited works from all four of his series at the Bruce Silverstein Gallery in 2014.

== Publications ==
=== Publications by Lyons ===
- Notations in Passing: Visualized by Nathan Lyons. Cambridge, MA: MIT, 1974. ISBN 9780262620284.
- Nathan Lyons: Works in Progress. Rochester, NY: Focal Point, 1980. OCLC 10192898.
- Riding 1st class on the Titanic!. Andover, MA: Addison Gallery of American Art; Cambridge, MA: MIT, 1999. ISBN 978-0262621359.
- After 9/11: Photographs. New Haven, CT: Yale University Art Gallery, 2003. ISBN 978-0300101829.
- Return Your Mind To Its Upright Position. Rochester, NY: ARTISANworks, 2014. ISBN 978-0-615-94266-7.

=== Publications with others ===
- Under the Sun: The Abstract Art of Camera Abstraction. George Braziller, 1960. Photographs by Lyons, Syl Labrot and Walter Chappell. With an introduction by Glyph Press.
- Whiteout: Dead man poems Revere, PA: Lodima, 2011. ISBN 9781888899702 . Photographs by Lyons, poetry by Marvin Bell. Edition of 3000 copies.

=== Publications edited by Lyons ===
- Photographers on Photography. A Critical Anthology. Prentice Hall, 1966. Edited by Lyons.
- The Persistence of Vision: Donald Blumberg, Charles Gill, Robert Heinecken, Ray K. Metzker, Jerry N. Uelsmann, John Wood. New York: Horizon, 1967. OCLC 268657. Edited by Lyons.. "Prepared on the occasion of the exhibition, 'The persistence of vision, ' which opened at the George Eastman House in June of 1967."
- Photography in the Twentieth Century. New York: Horizon Press, 1967. OCLC 603791 Edited by Lyons. "Prepared by the George Eastman House of Photography on the occasion of the exhibition 'Photography in the twentieth century, ' which opened at the National Gallery of Canada in February of 1967."
- Vision and Expression. New York: Horizon Press, 1969. OCLC 8528 Edited by Lyons. "Prepared on the occasion of the exhibition, 'Vision and expression, ' which opened at the George Eastman House in February of 1969."
- Eye Mind Spirit: The Enduring Legacy of Minor White. Howard Greenberg Gallery, 2008. Photographs by Minor White. ISBN 978-0974886305. Edited by Lyons. Preface by Peter Bunnell.
- Toward a Social Landscape: Bruce Davidson, Lee Friedlander, Garry Winogrand, Danny Lyons, Duane Michals. New York: Horizon Press, 1966. Edited by Lyons. Photographs by Bruce Davidson, Lee Friedlander, Danny Lyon, Duane Michals, and Garry Winogrand. OCLC 542009. "A collection of work ... represented in the exhibition, "Toward a social landscape," held at the George Eastman House, December 1966."

== Awards ==
- 1974: National Endowment for the Arts Fellowship to complete his series Notations in Passing.
- 1985: National Endowment for the Arts Senior Fellowship to continue his work on Riding First Class on the Titanic!.
- 1995: Honorary Doctorate of Fine Art from Corcoran School of Art, Washington, D.C.
- 1997: Honored Educator by the Society for Photographic Education.
- 2000: Infinity Award for Lifetime Achievement from the International Center of Photography.
- 2004: Honorary Doctorate of Fine Art from Rhode Island School of Design, Providence.
- 2006: Honorary Doctorate of Fine Art from Alfred University, Alfred, New York.
- 2016: Honoree: Visionary Award, The Lucie Awards
