= Carl Chiarenza =

American art photographer

- Born: 1935 (age 90–91); Rochester, New York
- Known for: Photography
- Website: carlchiarenza.com

Carl Chiarenza (born 1935) is an American art photographer. He works predominantly in black and white photography. From 1979, he has worked entirely in the studio, creating abstract compositions using materials such as torn paper and aluminum foil.

== Life ==
Chiarenza was born in Rochester, New York in 1935, to parents that had immigrated there from Italy. He studied with Minor White and Ralph Hattersley at the Rochester Institute of Technology. He was active in Boston, Massachusetts for three decades, beginning in 1957. He earned a Ph.D. from Harvard University in 1973, and was Professor of Art History at Boston University until 1986. He became a Professor of Art History at the University of Rochester beginning in 1986, where he eventually became Chair of Art and Art History. He is currently Professor Emeritus and Artist in Residence there.

== Exhibitions and collections ==
Chiarenza's photographs have been shown in more than 80 solo exhibitions and more than 250 group exhibitions, starting in 1957, and are in the collections of the Museum of Modern Art, the Art Institute of Chicago, the George Eastman Museum, the Philadelphia Museum of Art, and the Los Angeles County Museum of Art, as well as many other institutions.

== Publications ==
- Aaron Siskind: Pleasures and Terrors, Boston, 1982
- Landscapes of the Mind, David R. Godine, Boston, 1988
- Evocations, Nazraeli Press, Tucson, 2002
- Peace Warriors of Two Thousand and Three, Nazraeli Press, Tucson, 2004
- Solitudes, Lodima Press, 2005
- Interaction: Verbal / Visual, Nazraeli Press, Tucson, 2006
- Pictures Come from Pictures, David R Godine, Boston, 2008
