= Society for Photographic Education =

The Society for Photographic Education (SPE) is a nonprofit membership organization that provides a forum for the discussion of photography and related media as a means of creative expression and cultural insight. Through its interdisciplinary programs, services and publications, the society seeks to promote a broader understanding of the medium in all its forms, and to foster the development of its practice, teaching, scholarship and criticism.

== History ==
Prior to the 1960s, photography was taught primarily in departments of journalism at American universities. SPE emerged at a time when art departments were beginning to offer photography in their curriculum. Nathan Lyons, then associate director at the George Eastman House, recognized the newly emerging academic field; he coordinated and hosted a conference in November 1962 in Rochester, NY to address the concerns of these educators. Beaumont Newhall, Walter Rosenblum, Arthur Sinsabaugh, Aaron Siskind, Henry Holmes Smith, John Szarkowski, Jerry Uelsmann and Clarence White were among the thirty attendees at the “Invitational Teaching Conference.” Representing the intersection of fine art practice, education and history, these early participants aimed to formulate the goals, future and improvement of photographic education. The first annual national conference was held in Chicago in 1963 and the articles of incorporation were signed in May 1964. Since its establishment, many noted artists, curators, and critics in the field of photography have been involved with SPE or its programs. Although the majority of its 2,100+ members are fine art photographers and educators, curators, critics, historians and artists are also members. The national headquarters is located in Cleveland, OH, and the archives are held at the Center for Creative Photography in Tucson, AZ.

== Events ==
Every year an annual national conference continues the tradition of gathering some of the greatest artists, students, historians and thinkers of photography’s past, present and future. The annual event (52nd to be held in New Orleans, LA, March 12-15, 2015) attracts over 1,500 photographic artists, educators, students, curators, historians and enthusiasts from around the world. Featured speakers include recognized artists and over 45 hours of peer-reviewed programming from artists, historians, and curators, including panel discussions, imagemaker presentations, demos, and workshops. SPE’s four-day event also hosts an Exhibits Fair with 75+ representatives from industry, publishing, and academic institutions. Portfolio reviews are conducted throughout the event and programming is open to members and non-members of SPE alike. Contributions help support student scholarships, featured artists' costs, special events, and all programming.

== Regional organizations ==
SPE’s eight regional organizations (Northeast, Mid-Atlantic, Southeast, South Central, Midwest, Southwest, West, and Northwest) each serve the special needs of its local constituency and hold conferences/events in the autumn months, creating a sense of community within each region. Many regional associations also take an active role in advocacy issues, special publications, and newsletters.

== Caucuses ==
SPE currently offers membership in three caucuses – LGBTQ (Lesbian, Gay, Bisexual, Transgender, and Queer), Multicultural, and Women’s. Created to serve underrepresented members of the society, these caucuses provide an environment to discuss, support, and advance the role of LGBTQ, women, and multicultural imagemakers within the society as well as the profession.

== Exposure journal ==
Published since 1973, SPE's journal, Exposure, is a benefit of membership and is published bi-annually in the Spring (March) and Fall (September), with a print run of 2,700 copies per issue. A leading voice in the conversation on photography and related media for over forty years, Exposure publishes an inclusive range of images and ideas by those passionate about photographic discourse. Exposure seeks innovative, incisive, and timely submissions from its membership, and also welcomes submissions from non-members including artists, photographers, historians, critics, curators, scholars, educators, and other photography professionals.
