= Freyer =

Freyer is a surname. Notable people with the surname include:

- Achim Freyer (born 1934), German stage director, set designer and painter
- August Freyer (1801–1883), Polish musician and composer
- Bill Freyer (1900–1961), Australian footballer for South Melbourne and Footscray
- Christian Friedrich Freyer (1794–1885), German entomologist
- Dermot Freyer (1883–1970), Irish author and activist
- Frank Freyer, United States Navy captain and 14th Naval Governor of Guam
- Hans Freyer (1887–1969), German sociologist
- Heinrich Freyer (1802–1866), Slovene botanist, zoologist, paleontologist and pharmacist
- Ingo Freyer (born 1971), German professional basketball coach and former national team player
- John D. Freyer, American artist
- Martin Freyer (born 1995), Namibian cyclist
- Peter Freyer (1851–1921), Irish surgeon
- Sasha Waters Freyer (born 1968), American filmmaker
- Sigismund Freyer (1881–1944), German equestrian
- Ted Freyer (1910–1984), Australian footballer for Essendon
- Timothy Edward Freyer (born 1963), American Roman Catholic prelate
- Tony Freyer, American lawyer

== See also ==
- Freyer's pug (Eupithecia intricata), moth of the family Geometridae.
