= Garry Winogrand: All Things Are Photographable =

Garry Winogrand: All Things are Photographable
- Directed by: Sasha Waters Freyer
- Produced by: Sasha Waters Freyer
- Starring: Geoff Dyer; Tod Papageorge; Thomas Roma; Leo Rubinfien; Laurie Simmons; Matt Stuart; Michael Ernest Sweet; Matthew Weiner; Garry Winogrand
- Cinematography: Ed Marritz
- Edited by: Sasha Waters Freyer
- Production company: Pieshake Pictures
- Distributed by: Greenwich Entertainment
- Release dates: March 12, 2018 (South by Southwest); September 19, 2018 (United States)
- Running time: 90 minutes
- Country: United States
- Language: English

Garry Winogrand: All Things are Photographable is a 2018 documentary film about the photographer Garry Winogrand. It was directed and produced by Sasha Waters Freyer.

== Distribution ==
The film premiered in March 2018 at South by Southwest, had a limited release in U.S. cinemas in September 2018, and was shown as part of season 33 of the American Masters series on PBS in 2019.

== Cast ==
- Geoff Dyer
- Jeffrey Fraenkel (of Fraenkel Gallery)
- Susan Kismaric
- Erin O'Toole
- Tod Papageorge
- Leo Rubinfien
- Jeffrey Henson Scales
- Adrienne Lubeau
- Shelley Rice
- Thomas Roma
- Laurie Simmons
- Matt Stuart
- Michael Ernest Sweet
- Matthew Weiner
- Garry Winogrand (archive footage)

== Awards ==
- 2018: Special Jury Recognition for Best Feminist Reconsideration of a Male Artist, South by Southwest, Austin, TX
