= Gail Albert Halaban =

American photographer

Gail Albert-Halaban
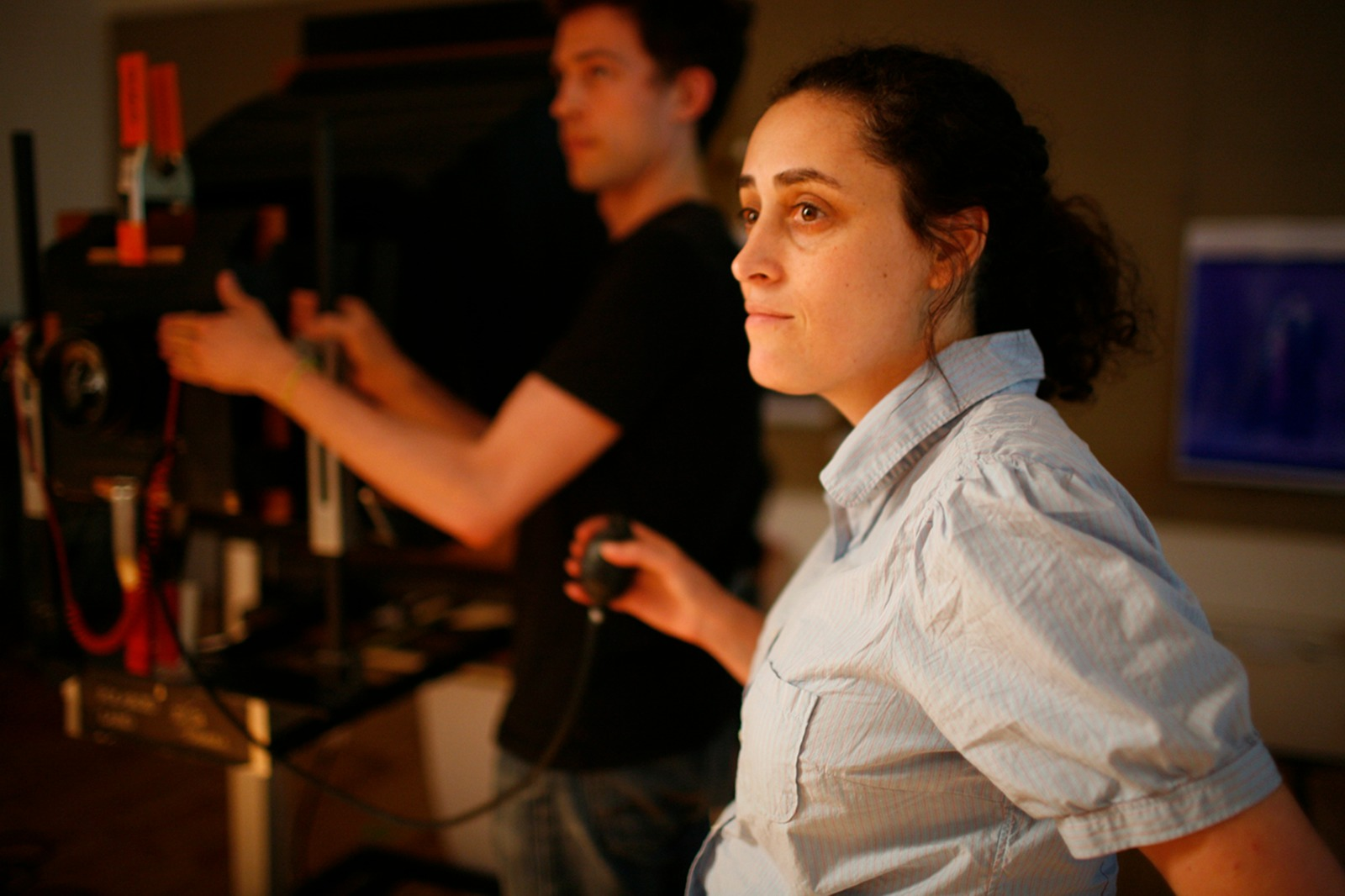
- Albert-Halaban in New York City, c. 2007.
- Born: 1970 (age 55–56); Washington, DC
- Occupation: Photographer
- Spouse: Boaz Halaban (m. 1997)
- Children: 2

Gail Hilary Albert-Halaban (née Albert; born 1970) is an American fine art and commercial photographer. She is noted for her large-scale, color photographs of women and voyeuristic urban landscapes.

== Life and career ==
Albert-Halaban earned her BA from Brown University and her MFA in photography from Yale University School of Art where she studied with Gregory Crewdson, Lois Conner, Richard Benson, Nan Goldin, and Tod Papageorge.

Albert-Halaban is represented by Weinstein Hammons Gallery in Minneapolis, Jackson Fine Art Gallery in Atlanta, and Podbielski Contemporary in Milan.

=== About Thirty series ===
Albert-Halaban's photographic series About Thirty examines the life of privileged women in New York City and Los Angeles, depicting scenes such as mothers with their nannies and groups of women comparing engagement rings.

=== Hopper Redux series ===
Albert-Halaban's series Hopper Redux photographs locations in Gloucester, Massachusetts, where Edward Hopper painted, creating contemporary images that reference Hopper's work.

=== Out My Window series ===
Albert-Halaban's ongoing series Out My Window consists of staged photographs of people in their homes, shot from a distance. The architecture of New York City apartment buildings features prominently in the pictures, with a focus on the inhabitants.

=== Out My Window, Paris series ===
Albert-Halaban's series Out My Window, Paris applies the same approach to Paris, photographing interiors visible through windows in the city's apartments and courtyards. The residents are knowingly photographed in staged compositions. A set of the Paris photographs first appeared in the French publication Le Monde in November 2012.

=== Out My Window, global ===
Albert-Halaban has published a book called Italian Views with the Aperture Foundation, in which she has photographed from window to neighboring window in cities throughout that nation and collected stories of what neighbors imagine when they look into their neighbors' windows.

She has photographed in countries around the globe, including South Korea, Turkey, Portugal, Canada, Argentina, France, and Israel, both by traveling to those countries and by using remote technology to photograph from her studio in New York City.

=== Distinctions ===
Albert-Halaban's work has appeared in numerous publications, including The New York Times, The New Yorker, Time, Slate and The Huffington Post. Her fine art photography has been internationally exhibited.

Albert-Halaban was a New York Foundation for the Arts fellow in 2019.

=== Collections ===
Albert-Halaban's work is in public and private collections, including the Hermes Foundation, George Eastman Museum, Yale University Art Gallery, Nelson-Atkins Museum, Getty Museum, Cape Ann Museum, and Wichita Art Museum.

=== Teaching ===
Albert-Halaban teaches in the Narrative Medicine Department at Columbia University, where she teaches art-making on the medical campus to students and faculty.

=== Cross-discipline work ===
Inspired by her Out My Window photograph series, Sheila Callaghan and Marcus Gardley composed a one-act play Grace & Milt, dramatizing what might happen when neighbors who have never met connect through their windows. Its debut performance, starring Adam O'Byrne and Zoe Winters, took place in April 2019 at Aperture Gallery in New York City.

== Personal life ==
Albert-Halaban married Boaz Halaban in 1997. They live in New York City with their two children.
