= Down to Earth =

Down to Earth may refer to:

== Film and television ==
=== Film ===
- Down to Earth (1917 film), an American comedy romance
- Down to Earth (1932 film), an American pre-Code comedy
- Down to Earth (1947 film), the sequel to Here Comes Mr. Jordan
- Down to Earth (1995 film), English title of the Portuguese film Casa de Lava
- Down to Earth (2001 film), a remake of the 1978 film Heaven Can Wait

=== Television ===
- Down to Earth (American TV series), a 1984–1987 sitcom
- Down to Earth (1995 TV series), a British sitcom
- Down to Earth (2000 TV series), a 2000–2005 British drama
- Down to Earth with Zac Efron, a 2020–2022 American documentary series
- "Down to Earth" (Code Lyoko), a 2007 episode
- "Down to Earth" (McLeod's Daughters), a 2005 episode
- "Down to Earth" (The Outer Limits), a 2000 episode

== Literature ==
- Down to Earth (book), a 2008 Canadian student anthology
- "Down to Earth" (comics), a 2003–2004 Wonder Woman story arc
- Down to Earth (magazine), an Indian science and environment magazine
- Down to Earth: Australian Landscapes, a 1999 essay and photography collection
- "Down to Earth", a 1963 short story by Harry Harrison
- Down to Earth, a 2018 book by Bruno Latour

== Music ==
- Down to Earth (concert), a 2020 concert for bushfire relief during the 2019–20 Australian bushfire season

=== Albums ===
- Down to Earth (Alexis & Fido album), 2009
- Down to Earth (Flight Facilities album) or the title song, 2014
- Down to Earth (Freddie Roach album), 1962
- Down to Earth (Jem album) or the title song, 2008
- Down to Earth (Jimmy Buffett album), 1970
- Down to Earth (Monie Love album) or the title song, 1990
- Down to Earth (Nektar album), 1974
- Down to Earth (Ozzy Osbourne album), 2001
- Down to Earth (Rainbow album), 1979
- Down to Earth (Ramsey Lewis album), 1958
- Down to Earth (Stevie Wonder album) or the title song, 1966
- Down to Earth (The Undisputed Truth album), 1974
- Down to Earth (Willie Cobbs album), 1994
- Down to Earth (soundtrack), from the 2001 film
- Down to Earth (EP), by Taeyang, 2023
- Down to Earth, by Nichelle Nichols, 1967
- Down 2 Earth, by Ras G, 2011

=== Songs ===
- "Down to Earth" (Curiosity Killed the Cat song), 1986
- "Down to Earth" (Peter Gabriel song), 2008
- "Down to Earth", by the Bee Gees from Idea, 1968
- "Down to Earth", by Brett Kissel from What Is Life?, 2021
- "Down to Earth", by Celldweller from End of an Empire, 2015
- "Down to Earth", by Grace, 1996
- "Down to Earth", by Justin Bieber from My World, 2009

== Other uses ==
- Down to Earth (radio play), a 1939 Australian radio play by Catherine Shepherd
- Down to Earth co-operative, a non-profit organization based in Melbourne, Australia
