= Down to Earth (book) =

- Editor: Michael Ernest Sweet
- Language: English
- Subject: Environmentalism
- Publisher: Trafford Publishing
- Publication date: November 29, 2008
- Publication place: Canada
- Pages: 154
- ISBN: 978-0557030651

Down to Earth (2008) is a Canadian literary collection by high school students in Montreal. The book focuses on environmental issues through creative writing. The collection features introductions by Roberta Bondar and Justin Trudeau as well as endorsements from David Suzuki and Robert Bateman. The book was edited and published by Michael Ernest Sweet.

== Contents ==
The book is a student anthology of poetry, fiction, non-fiction and drama. It was written to express concerns about global warming and environmental destruction. The book has two strands: the first warns about environmental destruction, and the second promotes a new awe of nature. It was launched by Justin Trudeau in 2008. Mark Garneau, first Canadian in space, wrote that the writing overwhelmed him, and made him realise that we must act now.

== Project ==
The publication is a part of the Learning for a Cause project at Lester B. Pearson High School and is edited by Michael Ernest Sweet.

Sweet began the program in 2004. Students were to select a piece they had written, the pieces were judged and the best 100 were selected for inclusion in the anthology. Print on demand classroom publishing means that students thoughts and opinions can be heard. One student wrote that, "... “It’s easy to write when you have a purpose. I like to know that other people are reading my work and it’s not just going onto the teacher’s desk.”
