= Hittinger =

Hittinger is a surname. Notable people with the surname include:

- Charles Hittinger, American actor
- Chuck Hittinger (born 1983), American actor
- F. Russell Hittinger (born 1949), the Warren Chair of Catholic Studies and Research Professor of Law at the University of Tulsa.
- Matthew Hittinger (born 1978), American poet and writer
