= Michael Ernest Sweet =

Canadian photographer, writer, and educator

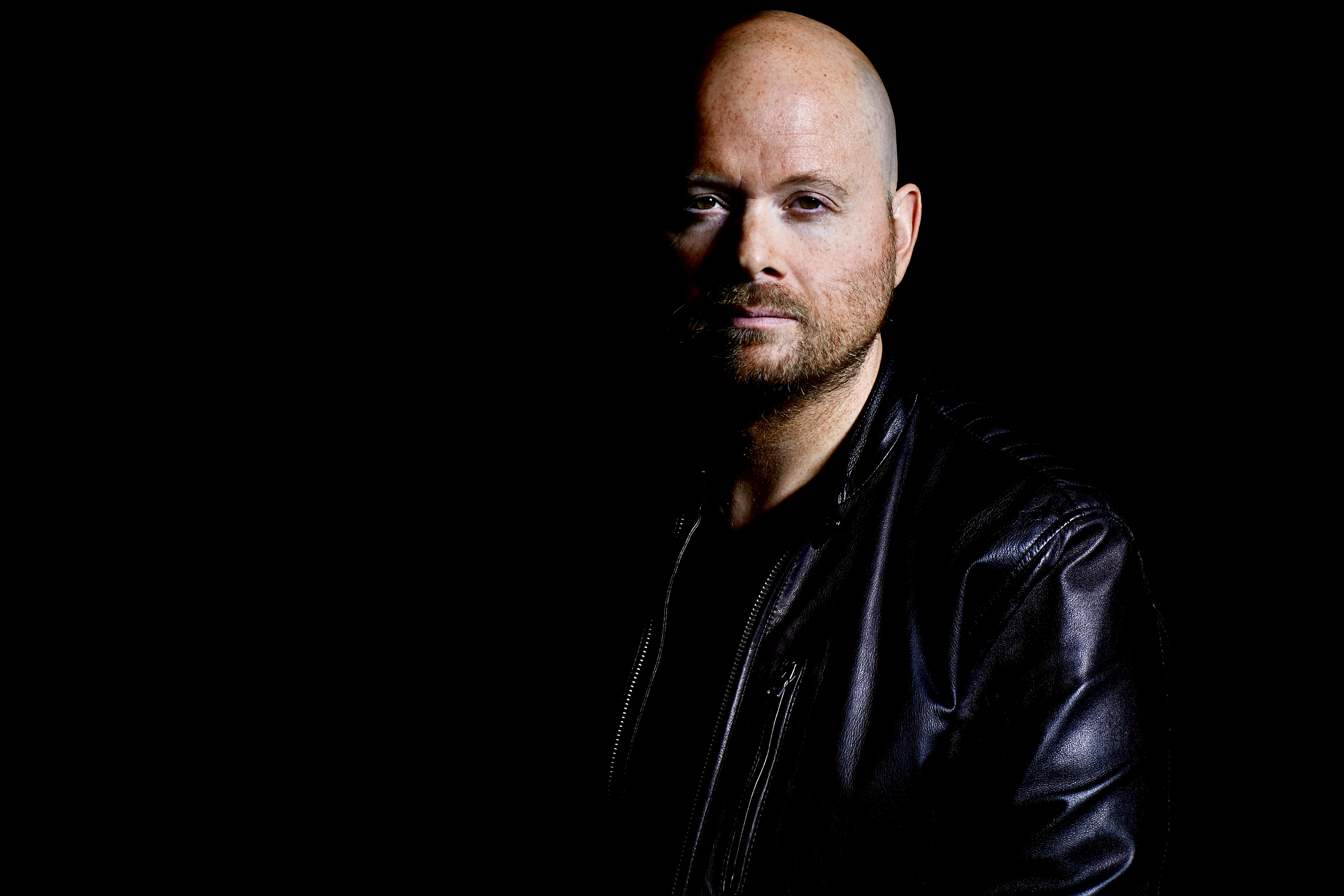
- Sweet in 2025
- Born: Martock, Nova Scotia, Canada
- Education: Johns Hopkins University; Concordia University; Nipissing University; St. Mary's University; London School of Journalism
- Occupations: Photographer, writer, educator
- Writing career
- Years active: 1996–present
- Genres: Street photography, nonfiction, essay, art criticism
- Notable work: The Human Fragment
- Notable awards: Queen Elizabeth II Diamond Jubilee Medal, Canadian Prime Minister's Awards for Teaching Excellence
- Website: michaelsweetphotography.com

Signature
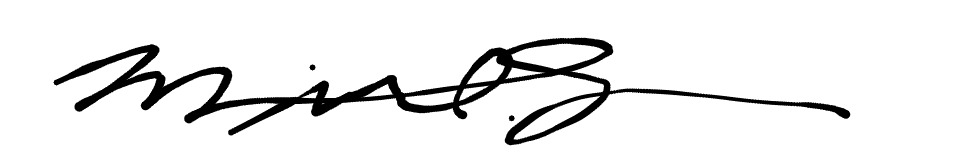

Michael Ernest Sweet is a Canadian photographer, writer, and educator. He is the author of two books of street photography, The Human Fragment and Michael Sweet's Coney Island.

== Teaching ==
Sweet was born and raised on his family's horse farm in Martock, Nova Scotia. He taught in public schools in Montreal, Quebec, from 2003 to 2015 and founded Learning for a Cause, which earned him two of Canada's highest civilian honors for service to education, A Prime Minister's Awards for Teaching Excellence and the Queen Elizabeth Diamond Jubilee Medal. Sweet was also a national finalist for a 2011 Governor General's Awards for Excellence in Teaching Canadian History and has been added to the Wall of Fame at the National Teachers Hall of Fame in the United States. As of 2019, Sweet was listed on the faculty at the Robert Louis Stevenson School, a private therapeutic day school in Manhattan, New York.

== Photography and writing ==
Sweet has made grainy black-and-white, oddly-framed, gritty, low-fi, close-up street photography. He has used cheap cameras, including disposable and instant cameras, and the Ricoh GR Digital. He is the author of two street photography monographs, The Human Fragment, and Michael Sweet's Coney Island. His photography often consists of "human fragments"—partial views of people on the street.

Sweet's photography has won both portfolio and spotlight prizes in Black and White Magazine, and a 2nd prize and Editor's Pick in Life Framer's "Black & White" and "Human Body" awards in 2024. He has written for the Evergreen Review, Canadian Teacher Magazine, Reed Magazine, English Journal, Photo Life Magazine, and Digital Camera magazine in the UK. He was a regular contributor to The Huffington Post photography section from 2014 until early 2017.

In 2018, Sweet appeared in Garry Winogrand: All Things Are Photographable, a feature-length documentary film on the life of photographer Garry Winogrand produced by Sasha Waters Freyer. In 2021, Sweet appeared in the film, Fill The Frame, a documentary about street photography in New York City.

Sweet wrote for Canada's Photo Life magazine from 2015 until its closure in 2021. He now contributes regularly to F-Stop Magazine as a photography critic. Sweet has also been a regular contributor to Canadian Teacher Magazine since 2008.

== Personal life ==
Sweet is married to poet Matthew Hittinger.

== Publications ==
=== Books of work by Sweet ===
- The Human Fragment. Brooklyn, NY: Brooklyn Arts, 2013. Second edition, 2017. ISBN 978-1936767243. With a foreword by Michael Musto.
- Michael Sweet's Coney Island. Brooklyn, New York: Brooklyn Arts, 2015. ISBN 978-1936767403.
- Disposable Camera. Purple Poetry, 2016. ISBN 978-0987756466.

=== Booklets of work by Sweet ===
- The Street Photography Bible: an Opinionated Little Guide to Street Photography. Self-published, 2014. ISBN 978-1499374438.
