= Garry Winogrand =

American street photographer (1928–1984)

- Born: January 14, 1928; New York City, US
- Died: March 19, 1984 (aged 56); Tijuana, Mexico
- Occupation: Street photographer
- Spouses: Adrienne Lubeau; Judy Teller; Eileen Adele Hale
- Children: 3

Garry Winogrand (/ˈwɪnəɡrænd/; January 14, 1928 – March 19, 1984) was an American street photographer, who portrayed U.S. life and its social issues in the mid-20th century. Photography curator, historian, and critic John Szarkowski called Winogrand the central photographer of his generation.

He received three Guggenheim Fellowships to work on personal projects, a fellowship from the National Endowment for the Arts, and published four books during his lifetime. He was one of three photographers featured in the influential New Documents exhibition at Museum of Modern Art in New York in 1967 and had solo exhibitions there in 1969, 1977, and 1988. He supported himself by working as a freelance photojournalist and advertising photographer in the 1950s and 1960s, and taught photography in the 1970s. His photographs were featured in photography magazines including Popular Photography, Eros, Contemporary Photographer, and Photography Annual.

Critic Sean O'Hagan wrote in 2014 that in "the 1960s and 70s, he defined street photography as an attitude as well as a style – and it has laboured in his shadow ever since, so definitive are his photographs of New York"; and in 2010 that though he photographed elsewhere, "Winogrand was essentially a New York photographer: frenetic, in-your-face, arty despite himself." Phil Coomes, writing for BBC News in 2013, said "For those of us interested in street photography there are a few names that stand out and one of those is Garry Winogrand, whose pictures of New York in the 1960s are a photographic lesson in every frame."

In his lifetime, Winogrand published four monographs: The Animals (1969), Women are Beautiful (1975), Public Relations (1977) and Stock Photographs: The Fort Worth Fat Stock Show and Rodeo (1980). At the time of his death, his late work remained undeveloped, with about 2,500 rolls of undeveloped film, 6,500 rolls of developed but not proofed exposures, and about 3,000 rolls only realized as far as contact sheets being made.

== Early life and education ==
Winogrand's parents, Abraham and Bertha, emigrated to the U.S. from Budapest and Warsaw. Garry was born and raised in a predominantly Jewish working-class area of the Bronx, New York City, where he grew up with his sister Stella; his father was a leather worker in the garment industry, and his mother made neckties for piecemeal work.

Winogrand graduated from high school in 1946 and entered the U.S. Army Air Force. He returned to New York in 1947 and studied painting at City College of New York and painting and photography at Columbia University, also in New York, in 1948. He also attended a photojournalism class taught by Alexey Brodovitch at The New School for Social Research in New York in 1951.

== Career ==
Winogrand worked as a freelance photojournalist and advertising photographer in the 1950s and 1960s. Between 1952 and 1954 he freelanced with the PIX Publishing agency in Manhattan on an introduction from Ed Feingersh, and from 1954 at Brackman Associates.

Winogrand's beach scene of a man playfully lifting a woman above the waves appeared in the 1955 The Family of Man exhibition at the Museum of Modern Art (MoMA) in New York which then toured the world to be seen by 9 million visitors. His first solo show was held at Image Gallery in New York in 1959. His first notable exhibition was in Five Unrelated Photographers in 1963, also at MoMA in New York, along with Minor White, George Krause, Jerome Liebling, and Ken Heyman.

In the 1960s, he photographed in New York City at the same time as contemporaries Lee Friedlander and Diane Arbus.

In 1964 Winogrand was awarded a Guggenheim Fellowship from the John Simon Guggenheim Memorial Foundation to travel "for photographic studies of American life".

In 1966 he exhibited at the George Eastman House in Rochester, New York with Friedlander, Duane Michals, Bruce Davidson, and Danny Lyon in an exhibition entitled Toward a Social Landscape, curated by Nathan Lyons. In 1967 his work was included in the "influential" New Documents show at MoMA in New York with Diane Arbus and Lee Friedlander, curated by John Szarkowski.

His photographs of the Bronx Zoo and the Coney Island Aquarium made up his first book The Animals (1969), which observes the connections between humans and animals. He took many of these photos when, as a divorced father, accompanying his young children to the zoo for amusement.

He was awarded his second Guggenheim Fellowship in 1969 to continue exploring "the effect of the media on events", through the then novel phenomenon of events created specifically for the mass media. Between 1969 and 1976 he photographed at public events, producing 6,500 prints for Papageorge to select for his solo exhibition at MoMA, and book, Public Relations (1977).

In 1975, Winogrand's high-flying reputation took a self-inflicted hit. At the height of the feminist revolution, he produced Women Are Beautiful, a much-panned photo book that explored his fascination with the female form. "Most of Winogrand’s photos are taken of women in either vulgar or at least, questionable positions and seem to be taken unknown to them," says one critic. "This candid approach adds an element of disconnect between the viewer and the viewed, which creates awkwardness in the images themselves."

He supported himself in the 1970s by teaching, first in New York. He moved to Chicago in 1971 and taught photography at the Institute of Design, Illinois Institute of Technology between 1971 and 1972. He moved to Texas in 1973 and taught in the Photography Program in the College of Fine Arts at the University of Texas at Austin between 1973 and 1978. He moved to Los Angeles in 1978.

In 1979 he used his third Guggenheim Fellowship to travel throughout the southern and western United States investigating the social issues of his time.

In his book Stock Photographs (1980) he showed "people in relation to each other and to their show animals" at the Fort Worth Fat Stock Show and Rodeo.

Szarkowski, the Director of Photography at New York's MoMA, became an editor and reviewer of Winogrand's work.

== Personal life ==
Winogrand married Adrienne Lubeau in 1952. They had two children, Laurie in 1956 and Ethan in 1958. They separated in 1963 and divorced in 1966.

"Being married to Garry was like being married to a lens," Lubeau once told photography curator Trudy Wilner Stack. Indeed, "colleagues, students and friends describe an almost obsessive picture-taking machine."

Around 1967 Winogrand married his second wife, Judy Teller. They were together until 1969.

In 1972 he married Eileen Adele Hale, with whom he had a daughter, Melissa. They remained married until his death in 1984.

== Death and legacy ==
Winogrand was diagnosed with gallbladder cancer on February 1, 1984, and went immediately to the Gerson Clinic in Tijuana, Mexico, to seek an alternative cure ($6,000 per week in 2016). He died on March 19, at age 56. He was interred at Mount Moriah Cemetery in Fairview, New Jersey.

At the time of his death his late work remained largely unprocessed, with about 2,500 rolls of undeveloped film, 6,500 rolls of developed but not proofed exposures, and about 3,000 rolls only realized as far as contact sheets being made. In total he left nearly 300,000 unedited images.

The Garry Winogrand Archive at the Center for Creative Photography (CCP) comprises over 20,000 fine and work prints, 20,000 contact sheets, 100,000 negatives and 30,500 35 mm colour slides as well as a small number of Polaroid prints and several amateur and independent motion picture films. Some of his undeveloped work was exhibited posthumously, and published by MoMA in the overview of his work Winogrand, Figments from the Real World (2003).

Yet more from his largely unexamined archive of early and late work, plus well known photographs, were included in a retrospective touring exhibition beginning in 2013 and in the accompanying book Garry Winogrand (2013). Photographer Leo Rubinfien who curated the 2013 retrospective at the San Francisco Museum of Modern Art felt that the purpose of his show was to find out, "...was Szarkowski right about the late work?” Szarkowski felt that Winogrand's best work was finished by the early 1970s. Rubinfien thought, after producing the show and in a shift from his previous estimation of 1966 to 1970, that Winogrand was at his best from 1960 to 1964.

All of Winogrand's wives and children attended a retrospective exhibit at the San Francisco Art Museum after his death. On display was a 1969 letter from Judith Teller, Winogrand's second wife:

But my analyst bill is not even relevant at this point. What is extremely relevant is the money you owe the government in back taxes. Your inability to pay the rent on time. Your constantly running out of money. Your credit rating. And most of all, your flippant, irresponsible, nonsensical attitude toward all these very real problems. (‘I’ll wait till the government catches up with me. Why should I pay them any money now?’) You seem incapable of exercising your mind in any cogent way.

Szarkowski called Winogrand the central photographer of his generation. Frank Van Riper of the Washington Post described him as "one of the greatest documentary photographers of his era" and added that he was "a bluntspoken, sweet-natured native New Yorker, who had the voice of a Bronx cabbie and the intensity of a pig hunting truffles." Critic Sean O'Hagan wrote in The Guardian in 2014 that in "the 1960s and 70s, he defined street photography as an attitude as well as a style – and it has laboured in his shadow ever since, so definitive are his photographs of New York"; and in 2010 in The Observer that though he photographed elsewhere, "Winogrand was essentially a New York photographer: frenetic, in-your-face, arty despite himself." Phil Coomes, writing for BBC News in 2013, said "For those of us interested in street photography there are a few names that stand out and one of those is Garry Winogrand, whose pictures of New York in the 1960s are a photographic lesson in every frame."

== Exhibitions ==
=== Solo exhibitions ===
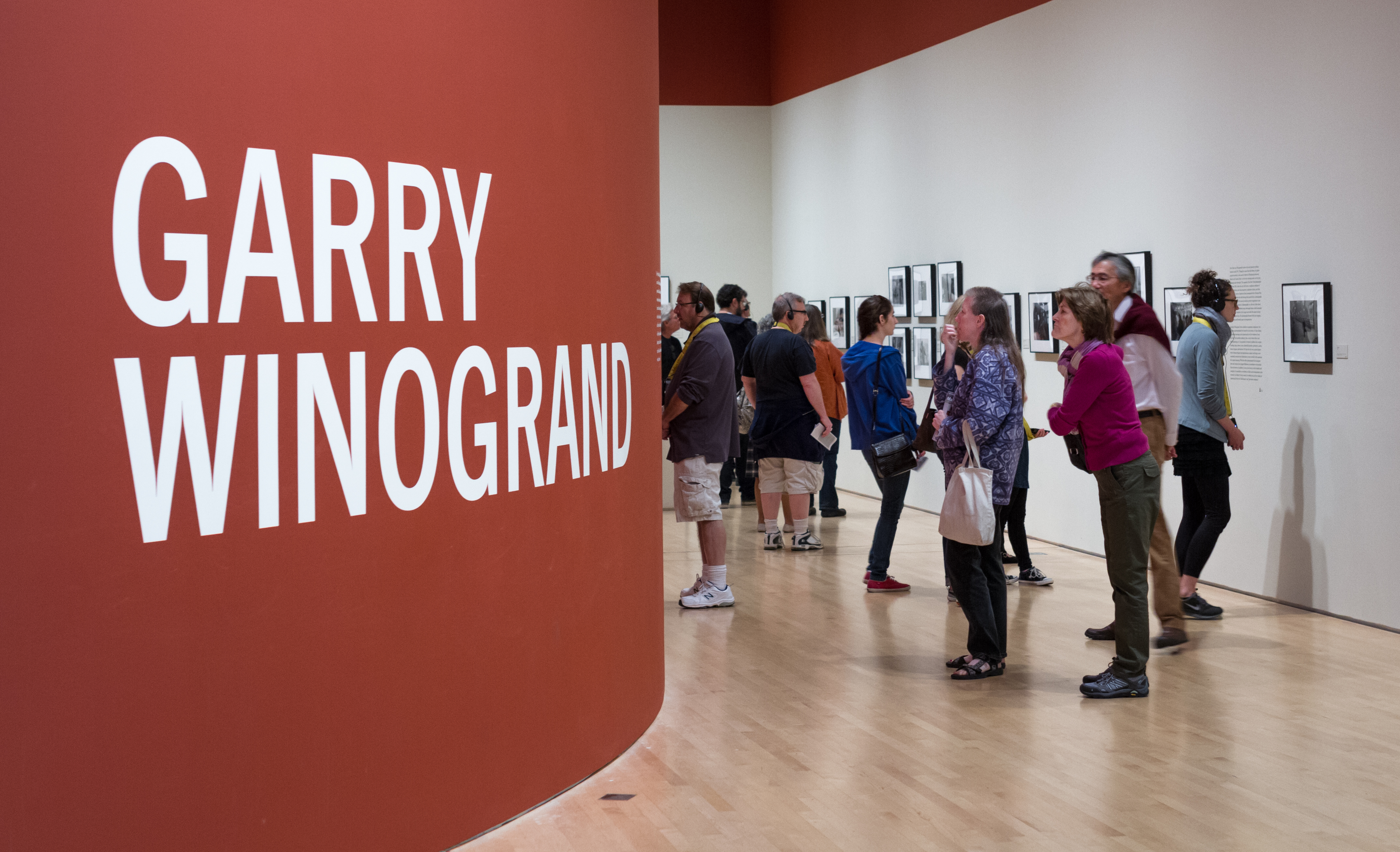
Exhibition at the San Francisco Museum of Modern Art, 2013

- 1969: The Animals, Museum of Modern Art, New York.
- 1972: Light Gallery, New York.
- 1975: Women are Beautiful, Light Gallery, New York.
- 1977: Light Gallery, New York.
- 1977: The Cronin Gallery, Houston.
- 1977: Public Relations, Museum of Modern Art, New York.
- 1979: The Rodeo, Allan Frumkin Gallery, Chicago.
- 1979: Greece, Light Gallery, New York.
- 1980: University of Colorado Boulder.
- 1980: Garry Winogrand: Retrospective, Fraenkel Gallery, San Francisco.
- 1980: Galerie de Photographie, Bibliothèque nationale de France, Paris.
- 1981: The Burton Gallery of Photographic Art, Toronto.
- 1981: Light Gallery, New York.
- 1983: Big Shots, Photographs of Celebrities, 1960–80, Fraenkel Gallery, San Francisco.
- 1984: Garry Winogrand: A Celebration, Light Gallery, New York.
- 1984: Women are Beautiful, Zabriskie Gallery, New York.
- 1984: Recent Works, Houston Center for Photography, Texas.
- 1985: Williams College Museum of Art, Williamstown, Massachusetts.
- 1986: Twenty Seven Little Known Photographs by Garry Winogrand, Fraenkel Gallery, San Francisco.
- 1988: Garry Winogrand, Museum of Modern Art. Retrospective.
- 2001: Winogrand's Street Theater, Rencontres d'Arles festival, Arles, France.
- 2013/2014: Garry Winogrand, San Francisco Museum of Modern Art, San Francisco, March–June 2013 and toured; National Gallery of Art, Washington, D.C., March–June 2014; Metropolitan Museum of Art, New York, June–September 2014; Galerie nationale du Jeu de Paume, Paris, October 2014 – February 2015.
- 2019: Garry Winogrand: Color, Brooklyn Museum, Brooklyn, NY, May–December 2019.
- 2024-25: Garry Winogrand: Man of the Crowd, the San Diego Museum of Art, San Diego, California, June 2024–January 2025.

=== Group exhibitions ===
- 1955: The Family of Man, The Museum of Modern Art, New York.
- 1957: Seventy Photographers Look at New York, The Museum of Modern Art, New York.
- 1963: Photography '63, George Eastman House, Rochester, New York.
- 1964: The Photographer's Eye, Museum of Modern Art, New York. Curated by John Szarkowski.
- 1966: Toward a Social Landscape, George Eastman House, Rochester, NY. Photographs by Winogrand, Bruce Davidson, Lee Friedlander, Danny Lyon, and Duane Michals. Curated by Nathan Lyons.
- 1967: New Documents, Museum of Modern Art, New York with Diane Arbus and Lee Friedlander, curated by John Szarkowski.
- 1969: New Photography USA, Traveling exhibition prepared for the International Program of Museum of Modern Art, New York.
- 1970: The Descriptive Tradition: Seven Photographers, Boston University, Massachusetts.
- 1971: Seen in Passing, Latent Image Gallery, Houston.
- 1975: 14 American Photographers, Baltimore Museum of Art, Maryland.
- 1976: The Great American Rodeo, Fort Worth Art Museum, Texas.
- 1978: Mirrors and Windows: American Photography since 1960, Museum of Modern Art, New York.
- 1981: Garry Winogrand, Larry Clark and Arthur Tress, G. Ray Hawkins Gallery, Los Angeles.
- 1981: Bruce Davidson and Garry Winogrand, Moderna Museet / Fotografiska, Stockholm, Sweden.
- 1981: Central Park Photographs: Lee Friedlander, Tod Papageorge and Garry Winogrand, The Dairy in Central Park, New York, 1980.
- 1983: Masters of the Street: Henri Cartier-Bresson, Josef Koudelka, Robert Frank and Garry Winogrand, University Gallery, University of Massachusetts Amherst.

== Collections ==
Winogrand's work is held in the following public collections:

- Art Institute of Chicago, Chicago, IL
- George Eastman Museum, Rochester, NY
- Museum of Modern Art, New York
- Whitney Museum of American Art, New York

== Awards ==
- 1964, 1969, 1979: Guggenheim Fellowship from the John Simon Guggenheim Memorial Foundation
- 1975: Fellowship from the National Endowment for the Arts

== Publications ==
=== Publications by Winogrand ===
The cover of Figments from the Real World.

- The Animals. New York, NY: Museum of Modern Art, 1969. ISBN 9780870706332.
- Women are Beautiful. New York, NY: Light Gallery; New York, NY: Farrar, Straus and Giroux, 1975. ISBN 9780374513016.
- Public Relations. New York, NY: Museum of Modern Art, 1977. ISBN 9780870706325.
- Stock Photographs: The Fort Worth Fat Stock Show and Rodeo. Minnetonka, MN: Olympic Marketing Corp, 1980. ISBN 9780292724334.
- Figments from the Real World. New York, NY: Museum of Modern Art, 1988. ISBN 9780870706400. A retrospective, published to accompany an exhibition at the Museum of Modern Art and which travelled. Reproduces work from each of Winogrand's previous books, along with unpublished work, plus 25 images chosen from the work Winogrand left unedited at the time of his death.
  - New York, NY: Museum of Modern Art, 1990. ISBN 9780870706417.
  - New York, NY: Museum of Modern Art, 2003. ISBN 9780870706356. With addenda.
- The Man in the Crowd: The Uneasy Streets of Garry Winogrand. San Francisco, CA: Fraenkel Gallery, 1998. ISBN 9781881337058. With an introduction by Fran Lebowitz and an essay by Ben Lifson. More than half of the images are previously unpublished.
- El Juego de la Fotografía = The Game of Photography. Madrid: TF, 2001. ISBN 9788495183668. Text in English and Spanish. A retrospective. "Published to accompany an exhibition at Sala del Canal de Isabel II, Madrid, Nov.-Dec. 2001 and at three other institutions through June of 2002."
- Winogrand 1964: Photographs from the Garry Winograd Archive, Center for Creative Photography, the University of Arizona. Santa Fe, NM: Arena, 2002. Edited by Trudy Wilner Stack. ISBN 9781892041623.
- Arrivals & Departures: The Airport Pictures of Garry Winogrand. Edited by Alex Harris and Lee Friedlander and with texts by Alex Harris ('The Trip of our Lives') and Lee Friedlander ('The Hair of the Dog').
  - New York: Distributed Art Publishers, 2003. ISBN 9781891024474.
  - New York: Distributed Art Publishers; Göttingen: Steidl, 2004. ISBN 9783882438604.
- Garry Winogrand.
  - San Francisco, CA: San Francisco Museum of Modern Art; New Haven, CT: Yale University Press, 2013. ISBN 978-0-300-19177-6. Edited by Leo Rubinfien. Introduction by Rubinfien, Erin O'Toole and Sarah Greenough, and essays by Rubinfien ('Garry Winogrand's Republic'), Greenough ('The Mystery of the Visible: Garry Winogrand and Postwar American Photography'), Tod Papageorge ('In the City'), Sandra S. Phillips ('Considering Winogrand Now') and O'Toole ('How much Freedom can you Stand? Garry Winogrand and the Problem of Posthumous Editing').
  - Paris: Jeu De Paume; Paris: Flammarion, 2014. ISBN 9782081342910. French-language version.
  - Madrid: Fundación Mapfre, 2015. ISBN 978-8498445046. Spanish-language version.
- Winogrand Color. Los Angeles: Twin Palms, 2023. Edited by Michael Almereyda and Susan Kismaric. ISBN 978-1-936611-18-8.

=== Publications paired with others ===
- Winogrand / Lindbergh: Women. Cologne: Walther Konig, 2017. ISBN 978-3960980261. Photographs from Women Are Beautiful (1975) by Winogrand and On Street by Peter Lindbergh, plus other color photographs by Winogrand. With a short essay by Joel Meyerowitz on Winogrand, and by Ralph Goetz on Lindbergh. Published on the occasion of the exhibition Peter Lindbergh / Garry Winogrand: Women on Street at Kulturzentrum NRW-Forum, Düsseldorf, 2017. Text in English and German.

=== Contributions to publications ===
- Looking at Photographs: 100 Pictures from the Collection of The Museum of Modern Art. New York: Museum of Modern Art, 1973. ISBN 978-0-87070-515-1. By John Szarkowski.

== Films ==
- Garry Winogrand: All Things Are Photographable (2018) – documentary feature by Sasha Waters Freyer
