= John D. Freyer =

American artist and educator

John D. Freyer is an American artist who teaches Photography & Film at Virginia Commonwealth University.

== Projects ==
In 2002, Freyer auctioned everything he owned for $6000 on eBay.

=== Audio ===
Audio Postcards (2004–2005) was produced for National Public Radio and included such postcards as "On the Spin Cycle for Iowa's Ragbrai Race", "Iowa City Auction", and "Driven to Demolish".

=== Film and video ===
Second Hand Stories (2003) was a travel collaboration with Christopher Wilcha of interviewing collectors, sellers, and bystanders of bought and sold objects.

=== Photography ===
Opening the Flatpack, co-organized by Freyer and anthropologist Johan Lindquist (Stockholm University) in collaboration with design and architecture firm Uglycute, investigated and developed methods for approaching IKEA's Billy bookcase as a site of conceptual concern.

=== Sculpture ===
Walm-Art (2005) was a fully functional "museum store" inside an art gallery that sold objects from a local Walmart.

== Publications ==
- All My Life For Sale. Bloomsbury, 2002. ISBN 978-0747563020.

== Personal life ==
As of 2018, Freyer was married to Sasha Waters Freyer and they have two children.

== Exhibitions ==
- Aftermarket: Art, Objects and Commerce, Everson Museum of Art, Syracuse, New York, September 2005 – February 2006. Includes work from AllMyLifeForSale.Com, Walm-Art.Com, Surplus and Big Boy.
