= Poppies (poem) =

Poem

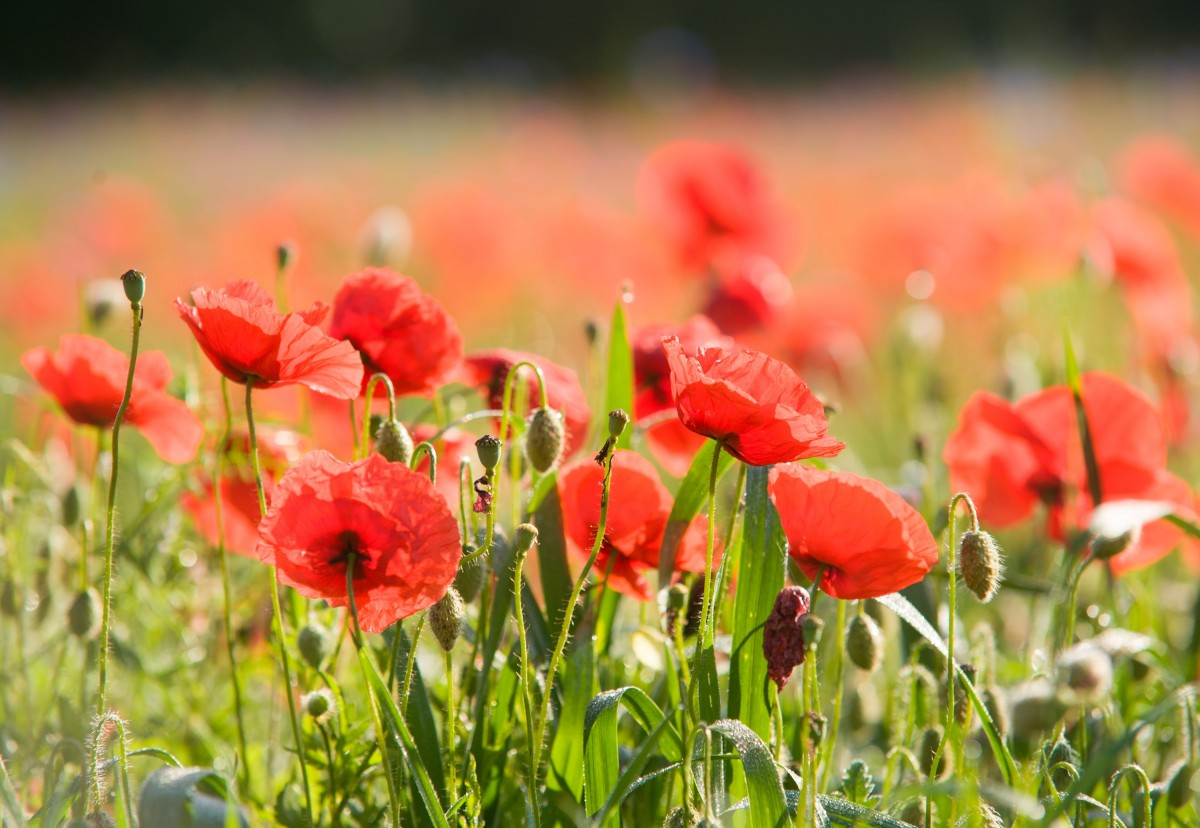
Field of poppies

"Poppies" is an inner dialogue poem written by Mary Oliver. The poem is focused on elements of nature, a common thread within Oliver's poetry, and calls readers to focus on the instruction that nature might supply.

== Synopsis and structure ==
The poem is heterometric in nature; its lines switch between iambic and trochaic trimeter, tetrameter, and dimeter. It is divided into nine distinct stanzas, each stanza as a quatrain with four lines. There are a total of thirty-six lines in the entire poem. There are five distinct sections to the poem, each turn is given through the use of a period at the end of the section.

== Publication history ==
"Poppies" has been published in two poetry compilations. The first, New and Selected Poems: Volume One, was released in 1992 through Beacon Press. A second, Devotions: The Selected Poems of Mary Oliver, was published in 2017 through Penguin Press. Reviews for both collections were positive and the books received praise from Stephen Dobyns of The New York Times Book Review, Rita Dove, of The Washington Post, and Elizabeth Lund, also of The Washington Post, among others.
