= In Blackwater Woods =

Free verse poem by Mary Oliver

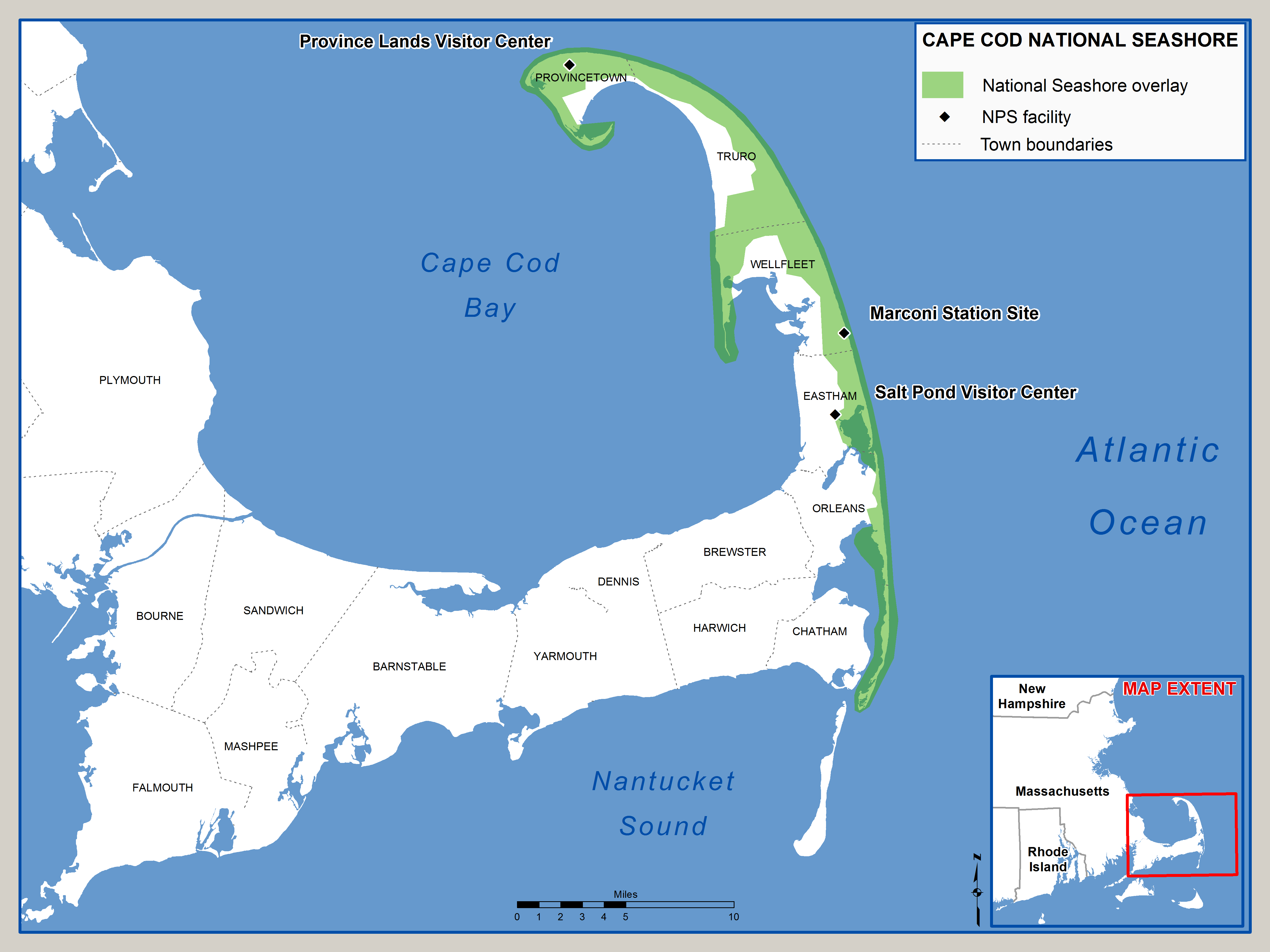
Depicts a map of Cape Cod with National Seashore shaded in green

In Blackwater Woods is a free verse poem written by Mary Oliver (1935–2019). The poem was first published in 1983 in her collection American Primitive, which won the 1984 Pulitzer Prize. The poem, like much of Oliver's work, uses imagery of nature to make a statement about human experience.

== Structure and content ==
"In Blackwater Woods" is a free verse poem with 9 stanzas. The first 8 stanzas all consist of 4 lines each, and the 9th stanza consists of five lines. Oliver favors short lines in this poem, mimicking the silence and blank space that must be allowed for when paying attention to the world or being introspective.

"In Blackwater Woods" contains imagery of a forest during autumn, which she connects to the idea of accepting death as part of life.

== Setting ==
Blackwater pond and woods is a recurring setting in Oliver's work. It is based on a part of Province Lands in the Cape Cod National Seashore in Provincetown, Massachusetts. Province Lands is full of numerous freshwater ponds along an approximately two mile long area. It was formed by eroding sand rather than glacial activity like the rest of Cape Cod, which has resulted in the formation of freshwater ponds and the growth of a pine and deciduous forest.

Blackwater woods may refer to the area surrounding Blackwater pond, which can be found along the Cape Cod National Seashore Beech Forest Trail despite being unmarked on the Park's map.

== American Primitive ==
The title of the collection may refer to an art style known as American Primitive art, or Naïve art. This is a type of art created by someone with little or no formal training. Oliver herself attended college but did not earn a degree. Naive art also focuses on simplicity over subtlety and Oliver has been quoted as saying that Poetry "mustn't be fancy" but should instead be clear.

“In Blackwater Woods” comes third to last in this collection. In 1984 the collection won the Pulitzer Prize for Poetry.

== Critical reception ==
Much of Oliver's work was criticized for its "traditional" subject matter of nature and God; however, her work was widely read and well known in America. Oliver's work resonated with Americans because it was able to look at systems of nature and derive truths about spiritual questions from them and present those truths in an accessible way. Her work has recently been reexamined and praised for its ability to examine the point of view of nonhuman subjects while still maintaining an awareness of the limitations of looking at those subjects from a human perspective.

"In Blackwater Woods" often has its last 10 lines quoted because of their particularly clear message about mortality and human experience. Despite the last lines being a direct statement about what one has to be able to do "to live in this world", Oliver is known for promoting attention to the world and awareness of one's own actions but never urging others to act in any particular way. For this reason, her poetry is described as being both "democratic" and "cautiously optimistic". "In Blackwater Woods" is also considered to show Oliver allowing the reader to inhabit the perspective of the plants and animals that make up the natural world described.
