= Mary Oliver: Saved by the Beauty of the World =

2026 documentary film

- Directed by: Sasha Waters
- Produced by: Sasha Waters
- Music by: Clare Manchon; Olivier Manchon
- Production companies: American Masters Pictures; Pieshake Pictures
- Distributed by: Kino Lorber
- Release date: March 5, 2026 (True/False Film Festival)
- Running time: 91 minutes
- Country: United States
- Language: English
- Box office: $801,887

Mary Oliver: Saved by the Beauty of the World is a 2026 American documentary film which explores the life and work of poet Mary Oliver. It was directed by Sasha Waters.

== Reception ==
On the review aggregator website Rotten Tomatoes, 94% of 33 critics' reviews are positive, with an average rating of 8/10. Metacritic, which uses a weighted average, assigned the film a score of 82 out of 100, based on seven critics, indicating "universal acclaim".

Alissa Wilkinson of The New York Times wrote that the film "works best as criticism, making space for audiences to have their own experiences with her poems." Matt Zoller Seitz of RogerEbert.com gave the film four out of four stars and wrote, "This is a gentle, attentive and moving work of art about an artist."
