= Fine Madness =

American literary magazine

Fine Madness was a literary magazine that was published from 1982–2006, in Seattle, Washington. It was included in the anthology Best American Poetry.

The editorial board included: poets Louis Bergsagel (founder), James Snydal, John W. Marshall, Kathryn Macdonald, and Sean Bentley. Subsequent members of the board included poets Christine Deavel, John Malek, Anne Pitkin, Judith Skillman, David Edelman, Alan Wald (not Dr. Alan M. Wald, and Sherry Rind.

The magazine's name came from an excerpt of a poem by English poet Michael Drayton (1563–1631):

Neat Marlow bathed in Thespian springs
Had in him those brave translunary things
That the first poets had, his raptures were,
All ayre, and fire, which made his verses cleere,
For that fine madness he did retaine,
Which rightly should possess a poet’s braine.

The first issue was produced single-handedly by Bergsagel in 1982; the second volume with its full board appeared in 1984 as a triquarterly; issues then appeared semiannually through volume 10; annual issues appeared for 10 years thereafter. Bergsagel left the magazine in 1995. The last issue was number 30. An anthology was also published, March Hares: The Best Poems from Fine Madness 1982 – 2002.

The editorial guidelines stated, 'Fine Madness is seeking writers with distinctive voices, and writing that shows a mind working, not just a tongue. We are open to almost any style of poetry or prose, provided that the form works for the piece and not against it.'

For several years the magazine offered awards outstanding work in the current issue: the Nelson Bentley Editor's Choice, the Kay Deeter Award, and the Mark Anderson Award (all $500). These awards were funded by individual donors. The magazine itself was wholly supported by subscription and private donation, aside from a single National Endowment Award grant.

Among its notable contributors were Albert Goldbarth, Naomi Shihab Nye, Dannie Abse, Tess Gallagher, Ted Kooser, Pattiann Rogers, William Stafford, Andrei Codrescu, Sherman Alexie, Linda Bierds, Matthew Hittinger, and Greg Kuzma.
