= Mary Oliver =

American poet (1935–2019)

- Born: September 10, 1935; Maple Heights, Ohio, U.S.
- Died: January 17, 2019 (aged 83); Hobe Sound, Florida, U.S.
- Education: Vassar College; Ohio State University
- Occupation: Poet
- Partner: Molly Malone Cook
- Writing career
- Notable awards: National Book Award (1992); Pulitzer Prize (1984)

Mary Jane Oliver (September 10, 1935 – January 17, 2019) was an American poet who won the Pulitzer Prize in 1984 and the National Book Award in 1992. She found inspiration for her work in nature and had a lifelong habit of solitary walks in the wild. Her poetry is characterized by wonderment at the natural environment, vivid imagery, spirituality, and unadorned language. Oliver is one of the best-selling poets in American history.

== Early life ==
Mary Oliver was born to Edward William and Helen M. Oliver on September 10, 1935, in Maple Heights, Ohio, a semi-rural suburb of Cleveland. Her father was a social studies teacher and athletics coach in the Cleveland public schools. As a child, she spent a great deal of time outside, going on walks or reading. In an interview with The Christian Science Monitor in 1992, Oliver said of growing up in Ohio:

It was pastoral, it was nice, it was an extended family. I don't know why I felt such an affinity with the natural world except that it was available to me. That's the first thing. It was right there. And for whatever reasons, I felt those first important connections, those first experiences being made with the natural world rather than with the social world.

In a 2011 interview with Maria Shriver, Oliver said she had been sexually abused as a child and had experienced recurring nightmares. Oliver called her family dysfunctional, adding that though her childhood was very hard, writing helped her create her own world.

Oliver began writing poetry at the age of 14. She graduated from the local high school in Maple Heights. In the summer of 1951, at age 15, she attended the National Music Camp at Interlochen, Michigan, now known as Interlochen Arts Camp, where she was in the percussion section of the National High School Orchestra. At 17, she visited the home of the Pulitzer Prize-winning poet Edna St. Vincent Millay, in Austerlitz, New York, where she formed a friendship with the late poet's sister Norma. Oliver spent the next six to seven years at the estate helping Norma organize Edna St. Vincent Millay's papers.

Oliver studied at Ohio State University and Vassar College in the mid-1950s but did not receive a degree at either college.

== Career ==
Oliver worked at ''Steepletop'', Edna St. Vincent Millay's estate, as secretary to the poet's sister. Her first collection of poems, No Voyage, and Other Poems, was published in 1963, when she was 28. During the early 1980s, Oliver taught at Case Western Reserve University. Her fifth collection of poetry, American Primitive, won the Pulitzer Prize for Poetry in 1984. She was Poet In Residence at Bucknell University (1986) and Margaret Banister Writer in Residence at Sweet Briar College (1991), then moved to Bennington, Vermont, where she held the Catharine Osgood Foster Chair for Distinguished Teaching at Bennington College until 2001.

She won the Christopher Award and the L. L. Winship/PEN New England Award for House of Light (1990), and New and Selected Poems (1992) won the National Book Award. Oliver's work turns to nature for inspiration and describes the sense of wonder it instilled in her. "When it's over" she wrote, "I want to say: all my life / I was a bride married to amazement. I was the bridegroom, taking the world into my arms" ("When Death Comes" from New and Selected Poems). Her collections Winter Hours: Prose, Prose Poems, and Poems (1999), Why I Wake Early (2004), and New and Selected Poems, Volume 2 (2004) build the themes. The first and second parts of Leaf and the Cloud are featured in The Best American Poetry 1999 and 2000, and her essays appear in Best American Essays 1996, 1998, and 2001. Oliver was the editor of the 2009 edition of Best American Essays.

Other awards she received include the Lannan Literary Award and the Pioneer Award from the Santa Monica Public Library Green Prize for Sustainable Literature. She was awarded honorary doctorates from Marquette University (2012), Tufts University (2008), Dartmouth College (2007), and The Art Institute of Boston (1998).

In 2007, The New York Times called Oliver "far and away, this country's best-selling poet."

== Poetic identity ==
Oliver's poetry is grounded in memories of Ohio and her adopted home of New England. Provincetown is the principal setting for her work after she moved there in the 1960s. Influenced by both Whitman and Thoreau, she is known for her clear and poignant observations of the natural world. According to the 1983 Chronology of American Literature, her collection American Primitive "presents a new kind of Romanticism that refuses to acknowledge boundaries between nature and the observing self." Nature stirred her creativity, and Oliver, an avid walker, often pursued inspiration on foot. Her poems are filled with imagery from her daily walks near her home: shore birds, water snakes, the phases of the moon, and humpback whales. In Long Life, she writes, "[I] go off to my woods, my ponds, my sun-filled harbor, no more than a blue comma on the map of the world but, to me, the emblem of everything." She once said: "When things are going well, you know, the walk does not get rapid or get anywhere: I finally just stop and write. That's a successful walk!" She said she once found herself walking in the woods with no pen and later hid pencils in the trees so she would never be stuck like that again. Oliver often carried a 3-by-5-inch hand-sewn notebook for recording impressions and phrases. Maxine Kumin called her "a patroller of wetlands in the same way that Thoreau was an inspector of snowstorms." Oliver said her favorite poets were Walt Whitman, Rumi, Hafez, Ralph Waldo Emerson, Percy Bysshe Shelley, and John Keats.

Oliver was also compared to Emily Dickinson, with whom she shared an affinity for solitude and inner monologues. Her poetry combines dark introspection with joyous release. Though criticized for writing poetry that assumes a close relationship between women and nature, she found that the self is only strengthened through immersion in the natural environment. Oliver is also known for her straightforward language and accessible themes. The Harvard Review describes her work as an antidote to "inattention and the baroque conventions of our social and professional lives. She is a poet of wisdom and generosity whose vision allows us to look intimately at a world not of our making."

In America magazine, Lisa Ampleman wrote that Oliver's writing "became more and more spiritual" as she grew older. "For example, her latest book, a collection of selected poems, is titled Devotions. The New Yorker's Ruth Franklin notes that 'many poems here would not feel out of place in a religious service, albeit a rather unconventional one.'"

In a review of Oliver's 2006 collection Thirst, Fordham University professor Angela Alaimo O'Donnell wrote: "Often the poet approaches God, uncharacteristically, through more conventionally religious means: through the language of prayer and meditation, through engagement of liturgical ritual and through participation in sacrament. The presence of these elements marks a movement away from the nonspecific spirituality implicit in Oliver's previous work and toward a frank acknowledgment of faith that is decidedly Christian. The gifts the poet discovers as she endures this dark night of the soul are many, and chief among these is her faith. In a remarkable series of poems interspersed throughout the volume, she chronicles a process of awakening to God's loving presence through the reading of Scripture ("After Her Death"), through attending church and partaking of the Eucharist ("Coming to God: First Days", "The Vast Ocean Begins Just Outside Our Church: The Eucharist") and through imaginative engagement of Christ's words and events in his life ("Six Recognitions of the Lord", "The Poet Thinks About the Donkey and Gethsemane"). In these latter two poems, Oliver explores spiritual and aesthetic terrain that is traditional and yet does so in a way that is characteristically her own."

Debra Dean Murphy wrote, "Although Oliver may have begun to treat theological themes more frequently and to use Christian language more explicitly, she remains true to what her work has always been about: pointing readers to the gift of presence—reminding us, in poems that are often deceptively simple, of what it means to attend to what is before us in any given moment. This is also the gift of wonder, of a posture of receptivity that Christians sometimes speak of as ... the calling to live more fully into our humanity as persons bearing the imago dei, to mirror the divine dance of mutual presence, mutual receptivity, mutual love.

== Personal life ==
On a visit to the town of Austerlitz, New York in the late 1950s, Oliver met photographer Molly Malone Cook, who became her partner for over 40 years. In Our World, a book of Cook's photos and journal excerpts Oliver compiled after Cook's death, Oliver writes, "I took one look [at Cook] and fell, hook and tumble." Cook was Oliver's literary agent. They made their home largely in Provincetown, Massachusetts, where they lived until Cook's death in 2005, and where Oliver continued to live until moving to Florida. Of Provincetown, she said: "I too fell in love with the town, that marvelous convergence of land and water; Mediterranean light; fishermen who made their living by hard and difficult work from frighteningly small boats; and, both residents and sometime visitors, the many artists and writers.[...] M. and I decided to stay."

Oliver valued her privacy and gave very few interviews, saying she preferred for her writing to speak for itself.

In "Six Recognitions of the Lord," Oliver described her internal growth over the course of time: "Lord God, mercy is in your hands, pour / me a little. And tenderness too. My / need is great ... / When I first found you I was / filled with light ... / Of course I have always known you / are present in the clouds, and the / black oak I especially adore ... / We have lived so long in the heaven of touch, / and we maintain our mutability, our / physicality, even as we begin to / apprehend the other world. Slowly we / make our appreciative response. / Slowly appreciation swells to / astonishment. And we enter the dialogue / of our lives that is beyond all / understanding or conclusion. It is mystery. / It is love of God. It is obedience. / Oh, feed me this day, Holy Spirit ... / and help me to hear and to hold / in all dearness those exacting and wonderful / words of our Lord Christ Jesus, saying: / Follow me ... / And I give thanks but it does not seem/ like adequate thanks, it doesn't seem / festive enough or constant enough, nor does the / name of the Lord or the words of thanksgiving come / into it often enough."

Some of her personal life is covered in the 2026 documentary Mary Oliver: Saved by the Beauty of the World, directed by Sasha Waters, which has a 97% positive rating by 30 critics on Rotten Tomatoes.

== Death ==
In 2012, Oliver was diagnosed with lung cancer, but was treated and given a "clean bill of health." Oliver died of lymphoma on January 17, 2019, at the age of 83.

== Critical reception ==
Oliver is one of the most widely read American poets in history and has been called "America's most beloved poet". But her popularity exceeds her critical reputation. From her earliest publications, critics called her work trite, sentimental, didactic, and self-indulgent, labels that endured throughout her career; William Logan called her "the poet laureate of the self-help biz". Benjamin Myers called Oliver's frequent invocations of wonder and faith "blithely bland" and "pandering". Responding to characterizations of sentimentality, Oliver's proponents have sought to emphasize her portrayal of violence and darkness in nature, and subtexts that "might have been lost in the process of memeification". Oliver's work has been the subject of few critical studies, and her coverage in journalistic criticism was scarce relative to her stature: The New York Times never published a full-length review of her work.

In the Women's Review of Books, Maxine Kumin called Oliver an "indefatigable guide to the natural world, particularly to its lesser-known aspects." Reviewing Dream Work for The Nation, critic Alicia Ostriker numbered Oliver among America's finest poets: "visionary as Emerson [... she is] among the few American poets who can describe and transmit ecstasy, while retaining a practical awareness of the world as one of predators and prey." New York Times reviewer Bruce Bennetin wrote that American Primitive "insists on the primacy of the physical" and Holly Prado of Los Angeles Times Book Review wrote that it "touches a vitality in the familiar that invests it with a fresh intensity." Angela Alaimo O'Donnell wrote that overall and particularly in Thirst, "the poet's regard for nature may seem to teeter occasionally on the brink of pantheism, yet attentiveness to the poems, especially within the context of this particular volume, soon dispels this misperception."

Vicki Graham suggests Oliver oversimplifies the affiliation of gender and nature: "Oliver's celebration of dissolution into the natural world troubles some critics: her poems flirt dangerously with romantic assumptions about the close association of women with nature that many theorists claim put the woman writer at risk." In her article "The Language of Nature in the Poetry of Mary Oliver", Diane S. Bond writes, "few feminists have wholeheartedly appreciated Oliver's work, and though some critics have read her poems as revolutionary reconstructions of the female subject, others remain skeptical that identification with nature can empower women." In The Harvard Gay & Lesbian Review, Sue Russell wrote, "Oliver will never be a balladeer of contemporary lesbian life in the vein of Marilyn Hacker, or an important political thinker like Adrienne Rich; but the fact that she chooses not to write from a similar political or narrative stance makes her all the more valuable to our collective culture."

== Selected awards and honors ==
- 1969/70 Shelley Memorial Award from the Poetry Society of America.
- 1980 Guggenheim Foundation Fellowship
- 1984 Pulitzer Prize for Poetry for American Primitive
- 1991 L.L. Winship/PEN New England Award for House of Light
- 1992 National Book Award for Poetry for New and Selected Poems
- 1998 Lannan Literary Award for poetry
- 1998 Honorary Doctorate from The Art Institute of Boston
- 2003 Honorary membership into Phi Beta Kappa from Harvard University.
- 2007 Honorary Doctorate Dartmouth College
- 2008 Honorary Doctorate Tufts University
- 2012 Honorary Doctorate from Marquette University
- 2012 Goodreads Choice Award for Best Poetry for A Thousand Mornings

== Works ==
=== Poetry collections ===
- 1963 No Voyage, and Other Poems Dent (New York, NY), expanded edition, Houghton Mifflin (Boston, MA), 1965.
- 1972 The River Styx, Ohio, and Other Poems Harcourt (New York, NY) ISBN 978-0-15-177750-1
- 1978 The Night Traveler Bits Press
- 1978 Sleeping in the Forest Ohio University (a 12-page chapbook, p. 49–60 in The Ohio Review—Vol. 19, No. 1 [Winter 1978])
- 1979 Twelve Moons Little, Brown (Boston, MA), ISBN 0316650013
- 1983 American Primitive Little, Brown (Boston, MA) ISBN 978-0-316-65004-5
- 1986 Dream Work Atlantic Monthly Press (Boston, MA) ISBN 978-0-87113-069-3
- 1987 Provincetown Appletree Alley, limited edition with woodcuts by Barnard Taylor
- 1990 House of Light Beacon Press (Boston, MA) ISBN 978-0-8070-6810-6
- 1992 New and Selected Poems [volume one] Beacon Press (Boston, MA), ISBN 978-0-8070-6818-2
- 1994 White Pine: Poems and Prose Poems Harcourt (San Diego, CA) ISBN 978-0-15-600120-5
- 1995 Blue Pastures Archived December 8, 2024, at the Wayback Machine Harcourt (New York, NY) ISBN 978-0-15-600215-8
- 1997 West Wind: Poems and Prose Poems Archived September 26, 2025, at the Wayback Machine Houghton Mifflin (Boston, MA) ISBN 978-0-395-85085-5
- 1999 Winter Hours: Prose, Prose Poems, and Poems Archived September 26, 2025, at the Wayback Machine Houghton Mifflin (Boston, MA) ISBN 978-0-395-85087-9
- 2000 The Leaf and the Cloud Da Capo (Cambridge, Massachusetts), (prose poem) ISBN 978-0-306-81073-2
- 2002 What Do We Know Da Capo (Cambridge, Massachusetts) ISBN 978-0-306-81206-4
- 2003 Owls and Other Fantasies: poems and essays Beacon (Boston, MA) ISBN 978-0-8070-6868-7
- 2004 Why I Wake Early: New Poems Archived September 26, 2025, at the Wayback Machine Beacon (Boston, MA) ISBN 978-0-8070-6879-3
- 2004 Blue Iris: Poems and Essays Beacon (Boston, MA) ISBN 978-0-8070-6882-3
- 2004 Wild geese: selected poems, Bloodaxe, ISBN 978-1-85224-628-0
- 2005 New and Selected Poems, volume two Archived September 26, 2025, at the Wayback Machine Beacon (Boston, MA) ISBN 978-0-8070-6886-1
- 2005 At Blackwater Pond: Mary Oliver Reads Mary Oliver (audio cd)
- 2006 Thirst: Poems (Boston, MA) ISBN 978-0-8070-6896-0
- 2007 Our World with photographs by Molly Malone Cook, Beacon (Boston, MA)
- 2008 The Truro Bear and Other Adventures: Poems and Essays Archived September 26, 2025, at the Wayback Machine, Beacon Press, ISBN 978-0-8070-6884-7
- 2008 Red Bird Archived September 26, 2025, at the Wayback Machine Beacon (Boston, MA) ISBN 978-0-8070-6892-2
- 2009 Evidence Archived September 26, 2025, at the Wayback Machine Beacon (Boston, MA) ISBN 978-0-8070-6898-4
- 2010 Swan: Poems and Prose Poems Archived September 26, 2025, at the Wayback Machine (Boston, MA) ISBN 978-0-8070-6899-1
- 2012 A Thousand Mornings Penguin (New York, NY) ISBN 978-1-59420-477-7
- 2013 Dog Songs Penguin Press (New York, NY) ISBN 978-1-59420-478-4
- 2014 Blue Horses Penguin Press (New York, NY) ISBN 978-1-59420-479-1
- 2015 Felicity Penguin Press (New York, NY) ISBN 978-1-59420-676-4
- 2017 Devotions The Selected Poems of Mary Oliver Penguin Press (New York, NY) ISBN 978-0-399-56324-9

=== Non-fiction books and other collections ===
- 1994 A Poetry Handbook Archived September 26, 2025, at the Wayback Machine Harcourt (San Diego, CA) ISBN 978-0-15-672400-5
- 1998 Rules for the Dance: A Handbook for Writing and Reading Metrical Verse Houghton Mifflin (Boston, MA) ISBN 978-0-395-85086-2
- 2004 Long Life: Essays and Other Writings Da Capo (Cambridge, Massachusetts) ISBN 978-0-306-81412-9
- 2016 Upstream: Selected Essays Archived September 26, 2025, at the Wayback Machine Penguin (New York, NY) ISBN 978-1-594-20670-2

=== Works in translation ===
Catalan

- 2018 Ocell Roig Archived April 2, 2018, at the Wayback Machine Translated by C. Oproae, Godall Edicions (Barcelona) ISBN 978-84-948407-0-8

German

- 2023 Sag mir, was hast du vor mit deinem wilden, kostbaren Leben: Gesammelte Gedichte Archived October 14, 2025, at the Wayback Machine Translated by J. Brôcan, Diogenes Verlag AG (Zurich) ISBN 978-3-257-07262-4

== See also ==
- Poppies, poem by Mary Oliver
- In Blackwater Woods, poem by Mary Oliver
- Lesbian poetry
