= Max Keeping =

Canadian broadcaster

- Born: Winston Maxwell Keeping; 1 April 1942; Grand Bank, Newfoundland
- Died: 1 October 2015 (aged 73); Ottawa, Ontario, Canada
- Occupation: Newscaster
- Years active: 1950s–2010
- Awards: Order of Canada (1991); Gemini Humanitarian Award (2003); Order of Ontario (2007)

Winston Maxwell "Max" Keeping CM OOnt (1 April 1942 – 1 October 2015), was a Canadian broadcaster. He was vice-president of news and public affairs at CJOH-DT, the CTV station in Ottawa, Ontario. Keeping was anchor of the local evening news broadcast from 1972 until his retirement in 2010 and was the station's community ambassador until March 2012.

== Biography ==
Keeping was born in Grand Bank, Newfoundland and began his news career in the late 1950s. His early work was as sports director of the St. John's Evening Telegram, a post that he occupied at the age of 16. He then worked with the radio station VOCM and CJCH in Halifax.

Keeping moved to Ottawa in 1965, when he became a parliamentary reporter first for CFRA radio, and then as a parliamentary reporter for CTV News.

Keeping returned to Newfoundland in the fall of 1972 to run as a Progressive Conservative in the October federal election, in the riding of Burin—Burgeo. He came in second place behind the Liberal incumbent, Don Jamieson, with 25% of the vote.

After the election he returned to Ottawa. Due to his political campaign, he was unable to return to his parliamentary bureau job at CTV. In November 1972, he joined CJOH as the local news director and was the station's news anchor from November 1972 until March 2010, making him one of the longest-serving Canadian television news anchors.

In his more than 40 years in Ottawa, Keeping became a local celebrity. He played an active role in many charitable drives, both through his news station, and outside. He was the long-time Master of Ceremonies of the CHEO telethon. It is estimated that he has participated in the collection of more than $100 million in charitable donations in the Ottawa area. This earned him a 2003 Gemini Humanitarian Award. Most recently Keeping accepted a doctorate from the University of Ottawa and an honorary post as patron for Learning for a Cause, a non-profit educational initiative which publishes and promotes the creative writing of high school students.

In 2003, Keeping announced on-air that he had been diagnosed with prostate cancer. Later that year, a section of CHEO was named the Max Keeping Wing in recognition of his support for the hospital.

Keeping announced on 3 December 2009 that he would retire as news anchor after 26 March 2010. On the same newscast, it was announced that his replacement would be Graham Richardson of CTV News's parliamentary bureau, who appeared on the air with Keeping and fellow anchor Carol Anne Meehan to make the announcement. After retirement, Keeping started a new job as the television station's "community ambassador."

He was treated for colorectal cancer in 2012, and in 2014 was diagnosed with untreatable cancer in his lungs. Keeping died on 1 October 2015.

== Awards and notable achievements ==
- Ontario Medal of Good Citizenship, 1983
- Member of the Order of Canada, 1991
- Key to the City of Ottawa, 2000, presented by acting mayor Allan Higdon
- Hon. Mac Harb thanked Mr. Keeping for his contributions to the city of Ottawa in the House of Commons in 2001
- Gemini Award for Humanitarian work, 2003
- A new wing of the Children's Hospital of Eastern Ontario was named in his honour in September 2003
- Inducted into the Canadian Association of Broadcasters' Hall of Fame in 2004
- Honorary doctorate from the University of Ottawa, June 2007
- Order of Ontario, December 2007
- Honorary doctorate from Carleton University in 2009.
- Ottawa councillor Rick Chiarelli announced that the city's next major arterial road would be called "Max Keeping Boulevard".
- The pedestrian bridge over the Queensway at the Vanier Parkway was named the Max Keeping Bridge in January 2016.
