= Molly Malone Cook =

American photographer

- Photo: Barbara S. Cheresh
- Born: January 5, 1925; San Francisco, California
- Died: August 25, 2005 (aged 80); Provincetown, Massachusetts
- Occupation: Photographer
- Partner: Mary Oliver

Molly Malone Cook (January 5, 1925 – August 25, 2005) was an American photographer. Cook worked with and photographed many famous figures such as Lorraine Hansberry, Norman Mailer, Eleanor Roosevelt, and John Waters.

== Career ==
Cook's interest in photography began while she was working for the United States Army in Heidelberg, Germany. Upon returning to the United States she was employed as one of the first photographers for The Village Voice. While working for the publication, Cook photographed Jean Cocteau, Lorraine Hansberry, Eleanor Roosevelt, Robert Motherwell, Norman Mailer, and several other famous artists of the time.

After moving to Provincetown, Massachusetts with her partner Mary Oliver in the 1960s, Cook opened the first photographic gallery on the East Coast, the VII Photographers studio. The studio represented many successful photographers such as Bernice Abbott, Eugene Atget, and Edward Steichen. The studio notably sold prints by Ansel Adams for $35. At that time, photography was considered an art form by relatively few people; although patrons were frequent, the studio could not sustain itself financially, and Cook closed its doors only a few years after opening.

Cook moved on to open the East End Bookshop. In 1966 Cook hired the then-unknown American filmmaker John Waters as a clerk, with whom she would maintain a friendship for the next 40 years. When her health began showing signs of decline in 1969, Cook closed the bookshop.

In the 1970s, Cook worked as a literary agent for Oliver, among other writers, as well as an assistant to Norman Mailer. During her time working as Oliver's agent, at any time that the couple received a telephone call for Oliver, Cook would pretend to be her, and many editors would play along.

== Personal life ==
Cook and Mary Oliver lived together in Provincetown, Massachusetts, after first meeting at the former home of poet Edna St. Vincent Millay in the late 1950s. Oliver dedicated many works to Cook, and while accepting the National Book Award in 1992 she publicly thanked Cook, saying "Molly Malone Cook, the best reader anyone could have. She is the light of my life." After Cook's death in 2005, Oliver published Our World, a compilation of Cook's journal entries and photography, accompanied by memories, prose and poetry written by Oliver.

Throughout her profession, Cook developed friendships with American artists such as playwright Lorraine Hansberry, writer Norman Mailer, and director John Waters. Waters is said to have brought magazines and newspapers to Cook's home every day towards the end of her illness.

After being put up for adoption as an infant, Cook spent her adulthood interested in discovering her own ancestry. Cook and Oliver visited Virginia several times with the intent of doing so. Among her discoveries, Cook found that she was related to Judith Jefferson, the aunt of Thomas Jefferson. Cook was eventually able to meet her birth parents.
