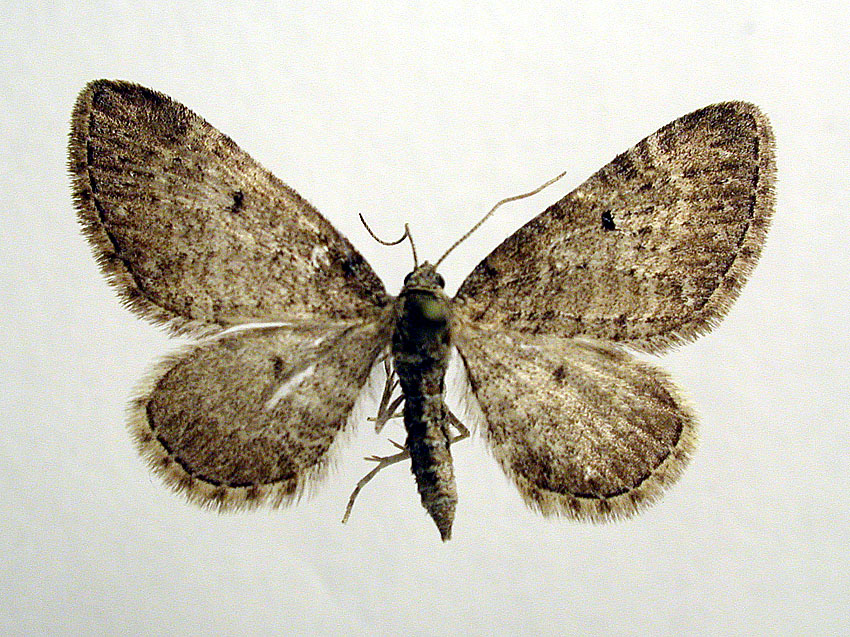

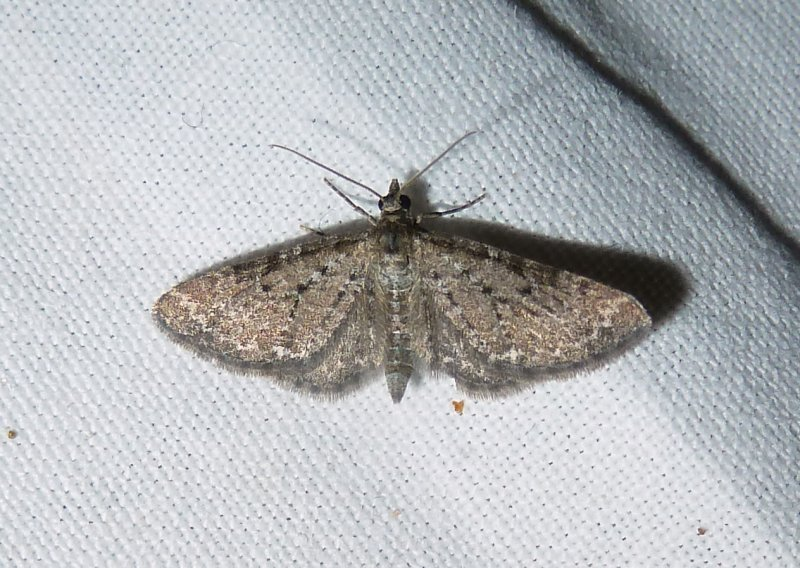

Scientific classification
- Kingdom: Animalia
- Phylum: Arthropoda
- Class: Insecta
- Order: Lepidoptera
- Family: Geometridae
- Genus: Eupithecia
- Species: E. satyrata

Binomial name
- Eupithecia satyrata (Hübner, 1813)

Synonyms
- Geometra satyrata Hübner, 1813; Eupithecia callunaria Doubleday, 1850; Eupithecia curzoni Gregson, 1884; Eupithecia divinula Cassino & Swett, 1924; Eupithecia dodata Taylor, 1906; Eupithecia fumata Taylor, 1910; Eupithecia grammaria Boisduval, 1840; Eupithecia inculta Vojnits, 1975; Eupithecia italicata Guenée, [1858]; Eupithecia mackieata Cassino & Swett, 1925; Eupithecia mongolica Vojnits, 1974; Eupithecia rivosulata Dietze, 1875; Eupithecia satyraria Boisduval, 1840 (misspelling); Eupithecia slocanata Taylor, 1908; Eupithecia submelanochroa Vojnits, 1973; Eupithecia terminata Taylor, 1908; Eupithecia satyrata intimata Pearsall, 1908; Eupithecia satyrata f. concolour Dietze, 1913; Eupithecia satyrata f. juldusi Dietze, 1910; Eupithecia satyrata f. medionotata Dietze, 1910; Eupithecia satyrata f. zermattensis Wehrli, 1928; Eupithecia satyrata var. fagicolouria Robson & Gardner, 1886; Eupithecia satyrata var. serenata Staudinger, 1896; Eupithecia satyrata var. subatrata Staudinger, 1871

= Eupithecia satyrata =

Species of moth

Eupithecia satyrata, the satyr pug, is a species of moth of the family Geometridae. It was described by Jacob Hübner in 1813. It is found from Ireland, through northern and central Europe (from Scandinavia to the northern Mediterranean) east to all of Russia and central Asia and western Siberia to Tibet. It is also present in North Africa and North America.

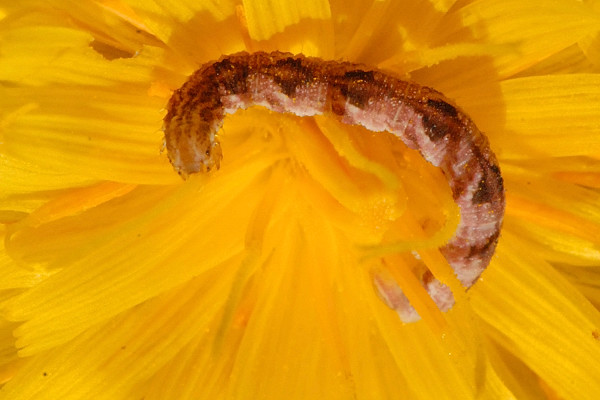
Larva

The wingspan is 18–24 millimetres (0.71–0.94 in). Eupithecia satyrata is variable in pattern. The ground colour of the wings is ash, grey or brownish. The veins often have a black with white dusting. There are paler crosslines. On the forewings a very indistinct terminal fascia ends in a tiny tornal spot. There is a fine discal spot on the forewing. This is absent on the hindwing. Prout gives an account of the variations.

Adults are on wing from March to September. There is one generation per year.

The larvae feed on the flowers of a wide range of plants including Achillea, Scabiosa, Solidago, Senecio and Erica tetralix.

== Subspecies ==
- Eupithecia satyrata satyrata
- Eupithecia satyrata callunaria Doubleday, 1850
- Eupithecia satyrata curzoni Gregson, 1884
- Eupithecia satyrata dodata Taylor, 1906
- Eupithecia satyrata intimata Pearsall, 1908
- Eupithecia satyrata juldusi Dietze, 1910
- Eupithecia satyrata rivosulata Dietze, 1875 (Yakutia, Siberia)
- Eupithecia satyrata subatrata Staudinger, 1871
- Eupithecia satyrata zermattensis Wehrli, 1928

== Similar species ==
- Eupithecia intricata
