= Matthew Hittinger =

American poet and printmaker (born 1978)

- Born: June 1, 1978 (age 48); Bethlehem, Pennsylvania, United States of America
- Education: University of Michigan, MFA; Muhlenberg College, BA
- Occupations: Poet, Corporate Executive
- Writing career
- Genres: Poetry, Essay
- Notable works: Pear Slip, Skin Shift
- Website: matthewhittinger.com

Matthew Hittinger (born June 1, 1978) is an American poet and printmaker.

== Biography ==
Matthew Hittinger was born and raised in Bethlehem, Pennsylvania, not far from the grave of H.D., and earned his Bachelor of Arts in Art History and English from Muhlenberg College in Allentown, Pennsylvania in 2000, and his Master of Fine Arts in Creative Writing from The University of Michigan in Ann Arbor, Michigan in 2004.

He is the author of the poetry collections The Masque of Marilyn, The Erotic Postulate, and Skin Shift which earned him a 2012 Debut Poet nod from Poets & Writers Magazine,. Matthew's newest book, Thought * Frost * Voodoo came out in 2024. Hittinger is also the author of several chapbooks including Pear Slip and Platos de Sal. Shortlisted for the National Poetry Series, the New Issues Poetry Prize, and twice for the Walt Whitman Award, Matthew's honors include a Hopwood Award and The Helen S. and John Wagner Prize from the University of Michigan, the Kay Deeter Award from the journal Fine Madness.

His work has appeared on Verse Daily and in over fifty journals including American Letters & Commentary, Barn Owl Review, Center, Crazyhorse, DIAGRAM, Dusie, Michigan Quarterly Review, Phoebe, StepAway Magazine and elsewhere, including a feature in Blue Fifth Review, the cover feature for the December 2008 MiPOesias, and in many anthologies including Best New Poets 2005, Ganymede (literary journal)|Ganymede Poets, One, Villanelles, Divining Divas: 100 Gay Poets on the Women Who Inspire Them, A Face to Meet the Faces: An Anthology of Contemporary Persona Poems, The Rumpus Original Poetry Anthology, and Love Rise Up: Poems of Social Justice, Protest and Hope. Hittinger's work has also been featured by the preeminent American poetry organization, The Academy of American Poets.

A collaborative artist, Hittinger has worked on a number of projects with artists in other disciplines, including the Canadian painter Kristy Gordon, the American painter Judith Peck, Chicago-based composer Randall West, and New York City-based composer John Glover. Glover's art song setting of Hittinger's poem "8:46 A.M., Five Years Later" was included in the Five Boroughs Music Festival's Five Borough Songbook (2012).

Hittinger is married to photographer and educator Michael Ernest Sweet.

== Publications ==
- Pear Slip. Spire, 2007. ISBN 9781934828007.
- Narcissus Resists. Goss183, 2009.
- Platos de Sal. Seven Kitchens, 2009.
- Skin Shift. Sibling Rivalry, 2012. ISBN 9781937420147.
- The Erotic Postulate. Sibling Rivalry, 2014. ISBN 9781937420772.
- The Masque of Marilyn. Goss183, 2017. ISBN 9781546552826.
- Thought * Frost * Voodoo. Small Harbor Publishing, 2024. ISBN 9781957248325.
