= Tony Freyer =

American lawyer and professor

Tony Allan Freyer is an American lawyer currently University Research Professor Emeritus at University of Alabama School of Law, and also held the Fulbright Distinguished Chair in American Studies at University of Warsaw.

He received a PhD from Indiana University in 1975.
