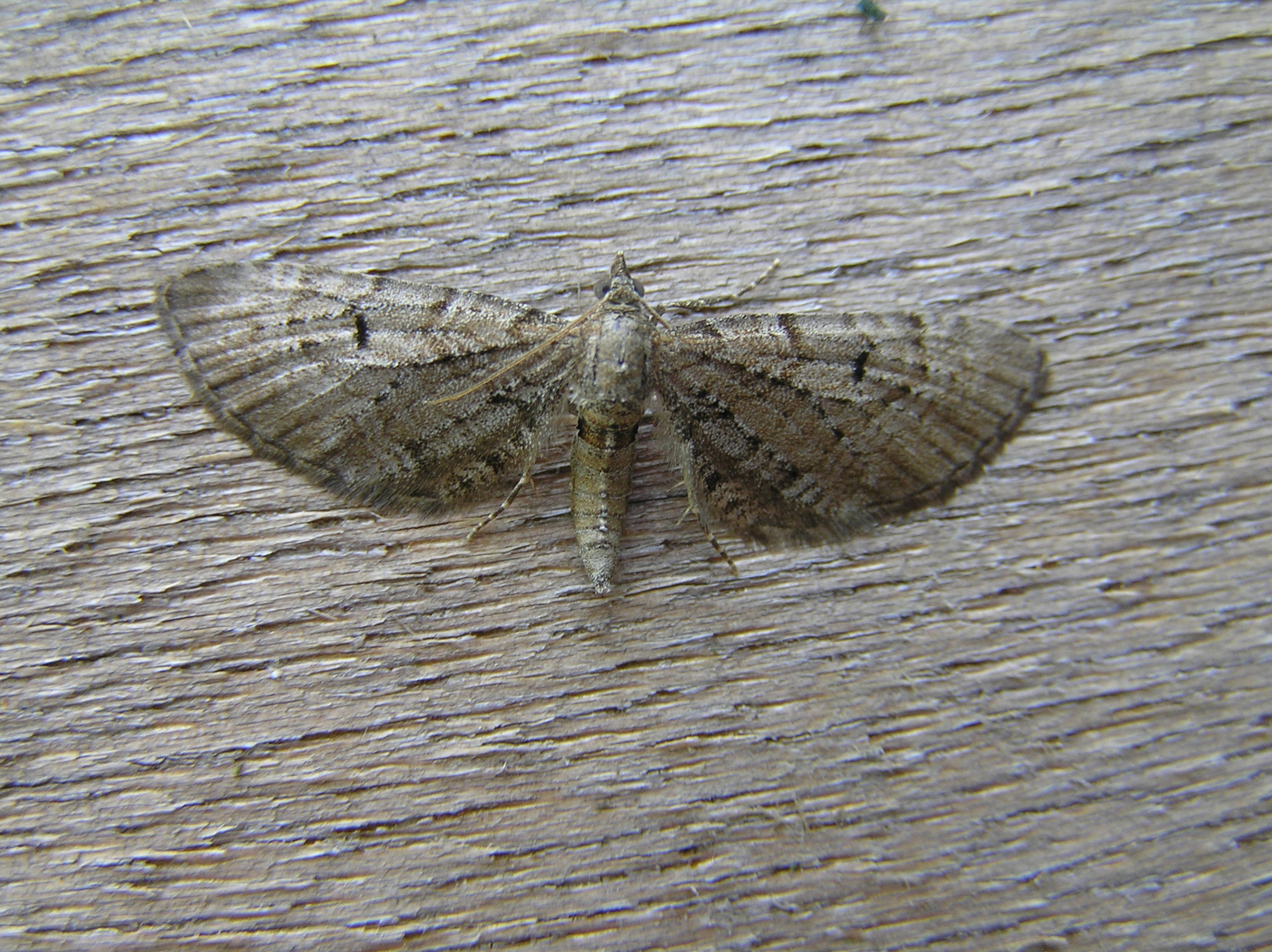

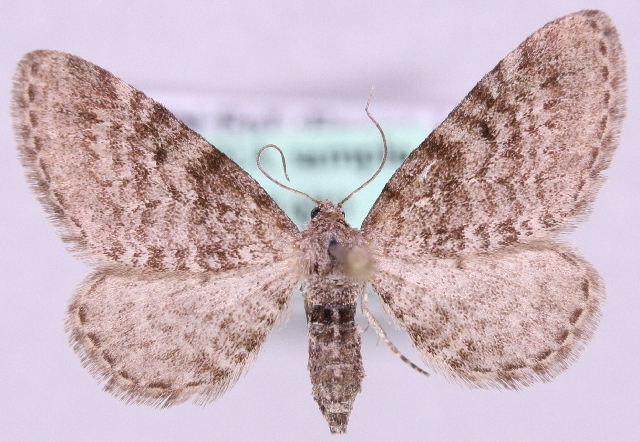

Scientific classification
- Kingdom: Animalia
- Phylum: Arthropoda
- Clade: Pancrustacea
- Class: Insecta
- Order: Lepidoptera
- Family: Geometridae
- Genus: Eupithecia
- Species: E. intricata

Binomial name
- Eupithecia intricata (Zetterstedt, 1839)

Synonyms
- Larentia intricata Zetterstedt, 1839; Eupithecia helveticaria Boisduval, 1840; Larentia arceuthata Freyer, 1841; Eupithecia anglicata Milliere, 1870; Eupithecia chagnonii Swett, 1911; Eupithecia gibsonata Taylor, 1910; Eupithecia pfeifferi Wehrli, 1929

= Freyer's pug =

Species of moth

Freyer's pug (Eupithecia intricata) is a moth of the family Geometridae. The species can be found in Europe (including Russia), east to the Urals, the Russian Far East, Kazakhstan and China. It is also found in North America. The wingspan is 20–24 mm. The length of the forewings is 12–13 mm. The ground colour is grey or brownish grey. The forewing has numerous crosslines, a short line represents the discal forewing spot. There is a clear spot on the hindwings. The second segment of the abdomen has a dark brown colour. Final stage larvae are smooth and elongated. They are grass-green, teal or yellow-green and have white laterodorsal lines and also white side stripes. They thus resemble the needles of their main food plant, the common juniper and are therefore difficult for predators to recognize.

The species primarily colonizes heathlands, sparse meadows, light pine forests as well as parks and gardens, but can also be found in built-up urban areas as well as in cemeteries. In the Alps, the species rises to heights of 2600 metres.

The moths fly in one generation from May to June.

The caterpillars feed on Cupressus and Juniperus species.

== Subspecies ==
There are a number of recognised subspecies:

- Eupithecia intricata intricata
- Eupithecia intricata arceuthata (Freyer, 1841) Central Europe
- Eupithecia intricata hibernica Mere, 1964 Burren, Ireland
- Eupithecia intricata millieraria Wnukowsky, 1929
- Eupithecia intricata taylorata Swett, 1907 (common name: Taylor's cedar looper) Nearctic (U.S.A)

== Etymology ==
The common name honours Christian Friedrich Freyer.

== Similar species ==
- Eupithecia satyrata ash-grey, very small discoidal spot, light grey abdomen, which lacks a dark brown segment.
