= Learning for a Cause =

Canadian nonprofit student press

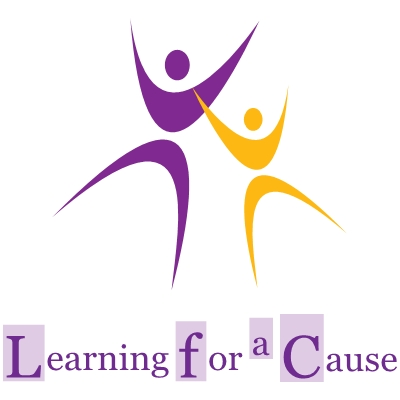
- Formation: 2004; 22 years ago
- Founder: Michael Ernest Sweet

Learning for a Cause is a nonprofit student press founded in 2004 by Canadian educator and photographer Michael Ernest Sweet. The initiative operated from Lester B. Pearson High School in Montreal until autumn 2010 when it merged into Youth Fusion Quebec. Sweet regained control of the imprint in 2014, effectively demerging from Youth Fusion. It continues to intermittently release titles, the most recent in 2018.

== Details ==
Learning for a Cause aimed to increase and strengthen the social and moral sensibilities in high school students by providing them with genuine opportunities to engage as citizens. The flagship project of the initiative was the Publishing Program which allowed Canadian high school students to write and publish on real-life issues in books, with the goal of inspiring change in their communities. More than 1500 high school students were published and made authors through this initiative. Given that the initiative's first book was published in 2004, Learning for a Cause was a trailblazer in terms of print-on-demand technology in Canadian classrooms.

More noted publications include Down to Earth, a collection of more than 100 high school students writing in response to global warming and environmental destruction. The volume featured guest writers Roberta Bondar and Canadian Prime Minister Justin Trudeau. Down to Earth was endorsed by a number of celebrities including Martin Sheen, David Suzuki, Farley Mowat and Marc Garneau. Columbia University Philosopher Maxine Greene has said that the project "is a significant opening to possibility" and legendary Canadian artist Robert Bateman added that "Learning for a Cause is what every young person should be doing." Down to Earth was a finalist in two categories at the 2009 World Indie Book Awards.

Other publications include Raising Humanity, which features introductions by actor Martin Sheen and Canada's First Astronaut Marc Garneau. The fifth anniversary compilation edition, FIVE, featured the "best of the best" from more than 1000 student writers. This volume was endorsed by Hollywood socialite Candy Spelling who also wrote an introduction to the book. We Who Listened is about Survivor Alex Levin and this book was a finalist for the Governor General's Award for Excellence in Teaching Canadian History in 2011.

The project and its publications have been featured in the Globe and Mail, Montreal Gazette, and Concordia University's papers The Link and The Journal. Features have also appeared in 34th Parallel Magazine and Canadian Teacher. Again in 2009 both Montreal Families Magazine and The Montreal Gazette profiled the project and its new publication Raising Humanity.

Learning for a Cause received a 2006 and 2009 Quebec Entrepreneurial Award and was featured in a Quebec Ministry of Education documentary video. In 2009, Canadian Prime Minister Stephen Harper recognized its founder, Michael Ernest Sweet, with a Prime Minister's Award and again in 2012 with the Queen Elizabeth II Diamond Jubilee Medal for his significant contributions to public education in Canada.

Youth Fusion Quebec, a non-profit, non-partisan organization that establishes partnerships between high schools and universities, in an effort to counter high school drop-out rates, will continue the publishing project with the Learning for a Cause imprint beginning in 2011–12.

Michael Ernest Sweet regained control of Learning for a Cause and its imprints in 2014, effectively demerging from Youth Fusion. The press released a new title in 2014, Our Memories, Our History, which features a foreword by former Canadian prime minister, Paul Martin. Learning for a Cause ceased operations in late 2014, following ten years of publishing young writers and charting the way for classroom print-on-demand publishing in Canada.

In 2017, Sweet reinstated the student publishing initiative at the Solomon Schechter School of Manhattan, where middle school students published On Democracy, an anthology about the American republic featuring a foreword by actor Martin Sheen, a long-time supporter of Learning for a Cause.

The late Max Keeping of CTV Ottawa was the official patron of Learning for a Cause for more than a decade. Keeping was also a long-time friend and mentor to Sweet.
