= Leo Rubinfien =

American photographer and essayist (born 1953)

Leo Rubinfien (born 1953) is an American photographer and essayist who lives and works in New York City. Rubinfien first came to prominence as part of the circle of artist-photographers who investigated new color techniques and materials in the 1970s.

Among his principal bodies of photography are A Map of The East (1992), which explores the character and idiosyncrasies of Japan, China and Southeast Asia; and Wounded Cities (2008), which explores the "mental wounds" that were left by the terror attacks in New York City in 2001, and other attacks in cities around the world. He has had a solo exhibition at the National Museum of Modern Art, Tokyo. He has also curated exhibitions.

Rubinfien is also a writer, who has published essays on major photographers of the 20th century. He contributed a memoir, Colors of Daylight to Starburst: Color Photography in America, 1970-1980 (2010). He is co-author of Shomei Tomatsu / Skin of the Nation (2004) and editor of Garry Winogrand (2013).

He is the recipient of a Guggenheim Fellowship and his work is held in the collection of the Metropolitan Museum of Art in New York City.

Rubinfien was born in Chicago and grew up in Japan. He attended Reed College from 1970-72, and then the California Institute of the Arts, where obtained his BFA in 1974. He then went on to receive his MFA from Yale University in 1977. He is an assistant professor at Fordham University.

== Publications ==
=== Books of photographs by Rubinfien ===
- A Map of the East. Boston: D.R. Godine, 1992 Thames & Hudson, Toshi Shuppan. ISBN 0879239433.
- 10 Takeoffs 5 Landings. Robert Mann Gallery, 1994. ASIN B0006PBJ0Y.
- Wounded Cities. Göttingen, Germany: Steidl, 2008. ISBN 978-3-86521-676-2. Photographs and a personal and historical essay by Rubinfien in Wounded Cities, which recounts the attacks of September 11th, 2001 and the years that followed.
- The Ardbeg. Tokyo: Taka Ishii Gallery and Kurenboh, 2010. With an essay by Rubinfien. Edition of 1000 copies. Japanese and English text. 15 pages.
- Paths through the Global City. Stanford, CA: Iris & B. Gerald Cantor Center for Visual Arts, Stanford University, 2011.
- Kizu Tsuita no Machi = "Wounded Cities". Tokyo: National Museum of Modern Art, 2011.
- New Turns in Old Roads. Tokyo: Taka Ishii Gallery, 2014.

=== Publications edited by Rubinfien ===
- Shomei Tomatsu / Skin of the Nation. 2004. Rubinfien was co-author.
- Garry Winogrand. San Francisco Museum of Modern Art and Yale University, 2013. Rubinfien was editor and Author. Photographs by Garry Winogrand.

=== Publications with contributions by Rubinfien ===
- Starburst: Color Photography in America 1970-1980. Berlin: Hatje Cantz, 2010. By Kevin Moore. ISBN 978-3775724906. With essays by Rubinfien and James Crump.
- Shomei Tomatsu: Skin of the Nation. New Haven, CT: Yale University, 2004. By Rubinfien, Sandra S. Phillips, and John W. Dower. ISBN 978-0300106046. With a preface by Daidō Moriyama.

== Awards ==
- 1982: Guggenheim Fellowship from the John Simon Guggenheim Memorial Foundation
- Japan Foundation fellowship
- Asian Cultural Council fellowship
- International Center for Advanced Studies at New York University fellowship
- 2009: Gold Prize at the 5th Lianzhou International Photography Festival

== Collections ==
- Metropolitan Museum of Art, New York City: 9 prints
- Museum of Modern Art, New York: 1 print (as of November 2019)
- Whitney Museum of American Art, New York: 2 prints (as of November 2019)

== Exhibitions ==
=== Solo exhibitions ===
- 1984: Philadelphia College of Art
- 1993: Metropolitan Museum of Art, New York
- 1993: Seibu Art Forum, Sezon Museum, Tokyo
- 1994: Seattle Art Museum, Seattle, Washington
- 1994: Cleveland Museum of Art
- 1995: Artists' Loft & Gallery, Galveston, Texas
- 2008: Corcoran Gallery of Art, Washington, D.C.
- 2009: San Francisco Museum of Modern Art, San Francisco, CA
- 2010: Kurenboh, Tokyo
- 2011: Iris & B. Gerald Cantor Center for Visual Arts, Stanford University, Stanford, CA
- 2011: National Museum of Modern Art, Tokyo
- 2011: Yale University Art Gallery
- 2011: Art Academy of Cincinnati
- 2013: Museum of Contemporary Art of Rome, Rome

=== Curated exhibitions ===
- 2001–2004: Co-curator of the San Francisco Museum of Modern Art (SFMOMA)’s retrospective of the work of Shomei Tomatsu
- 2010: Curator of SFMOMA’s retrospective of the work of Garry Winogrand, which toured to the National Gallery of Art, Washington, the Metropolitan Museum of Art, New York and the Jeu de Paume, Paris, in 2014.
