= Down to Earth (concert) =

Australian benefit concert

Down To Earth - A Fire and Climate Relief Concert
- Location: Melbourne, Australia
- Venue: Sidney Myer Music Bowl
- Date(s): 26 February 2020
- Duration: 8 hours
- Attendance: 12,100
- Box office: Over $1million AUD

Down to Earth was a 2020 benefit concert for bushfire relief during the 2019–20 Australian bushfire season.

== History ==
During the 2019-2020 Australian summer, several fundraising events were held following what was considered the worst bushfire season Australia had ever witnessed. Down To Earth - A Fire and Climate Relief Concert was announced in January 2020, to be held on 26 February at Melbourne's Sidney Myer Music Bowl.

Tickets went on sale January 9, and sold out within 30 minutes. The day prior to the concert, organisers announced a partnership with YouTube for the entire concert to be streamed live on their platform.

Hosted by radio presenter Bridget Hustwaite, the concert featured performances from Angus & Julia Stone, Briggs, Gang of Youths, Jack River, Ruby Fields, Tash Sultana, and Thelma Plum.

Tickets were sold for between $89.90-$119.90, with money raised from the concert distributed to Australian charity organisations including Red Cross, WIRES, Wildlife Victoria, Emergency Leaders For Climate Action, Foundation For Rural and Regional Renewal, and Firesticks Alliance Indigenous Corporation. All of the performing artists waived their fees and commissions, with all ticket, bar, and merchandise profits also donated, while a weblink to make donations during the live stream raised AUD$22,435. In total, the concert raised over $1 million and was attended by over 12,100 people, with a further 670,000 watching the live stream.

Since the concert, the eight hour video recording of Down To Earth has remained available to watch on YouTube and has been viewed over 700,000 times.

== Setlist ==
- Ruby Fields
- Welcome to Country
- Briggs
- Thelma Plum
- Jack River
- Angus & Julia Stone
- Tash Sultana
- Gang Of Youths
