= Tod Papageorge =

American photographer (born 1940)

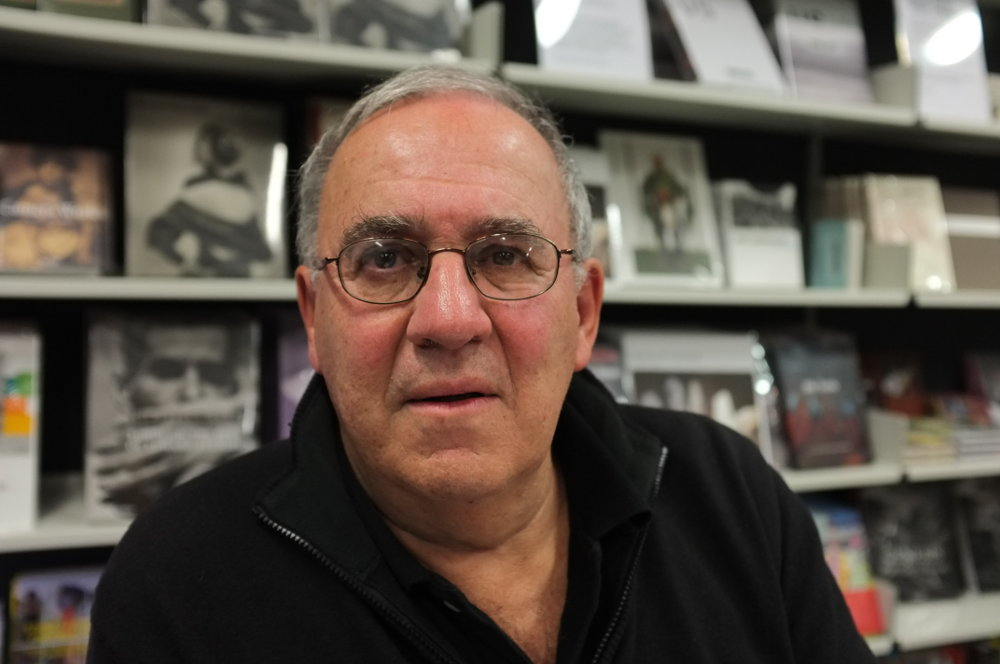
Papageorge at the Photographers' Gallery (London), 2014

Tod Papageorge (born in Portsmouth, New Hampshire United States, 1940) is an American photographer whose career began in the New York City street photography movement of the 1960s. He is the recipient of two Guggenheim fellowships and two NEA Visual Artists Fellowships. His work is in public collections including the Museum of Modern Art and the Art Institute of Chicago. Between 1979 and 2013 he directed the graduate program in photography at the Yale School of Art.

== Life and work ==
Papageorge started taking photographs in 1962 as an English literature major at the University of New Hampshire.

Between 1979 and 2013, he directed the graduate program in photography at the Yale School of Art, where his students included Lois Conner, Gregory Crewdson, Philip-Lorca diCorcia, Anna Gaskell, Steve Giovinco, Katy Grannan, An-My Le, Susan Lipper, and Abelardo Morell.

In 2007, Steidl published Passing through Eden, a collection of photographs Papageorge took over 25 years in Central Park. Also in 2007, Aperture published American Sports, 1970: Or How We Spent the War in Vietnam, containing photographs taken during his 1970 Guggenheim Fellowship.

This ridiculous-seeming activity of walking along the street and lifting up a little camera is so powerful, so complicated, and so resistant to being mastered. If I had the choice between doing that and sitting in an office somewhere … Are you kidding?

== Books ==
- Passing through Eden. Göttingen: Steidl, 2007. ISBN 3-86521-374-X.
- American Sports, 1970: Or How We Spent the War in Vietnam. New York: Aperture, 2007. ISBN 978-1-59711-050-1.
- Opera Città. Rome: Punctum, 2010. ISBN 978-88-95410-24-1.
- Core Curriculum: Writings on Photography. New York: Aperture, 2011. ISBN 978-1-59711-172-0.
- Studio 54.
  - London: Stanley Barker, 2014. ISBN 978-0956992215. First edition.
  - London: Stanley Barker, 2014. ISBN 978-0956992215. Second edition.
- Dr Blankman's New York. Göttingen: Steidl, 2017.
- On the Acropolis. London: Stanley Barker, 2019. ISBN 978-1-913288-02-0.

== Exhibitions ==
- 2013: Studio 54, Paris Photo, Paris, 25 January–12 April 2014.
