= Sasha Waters =

American filmmaker and educator

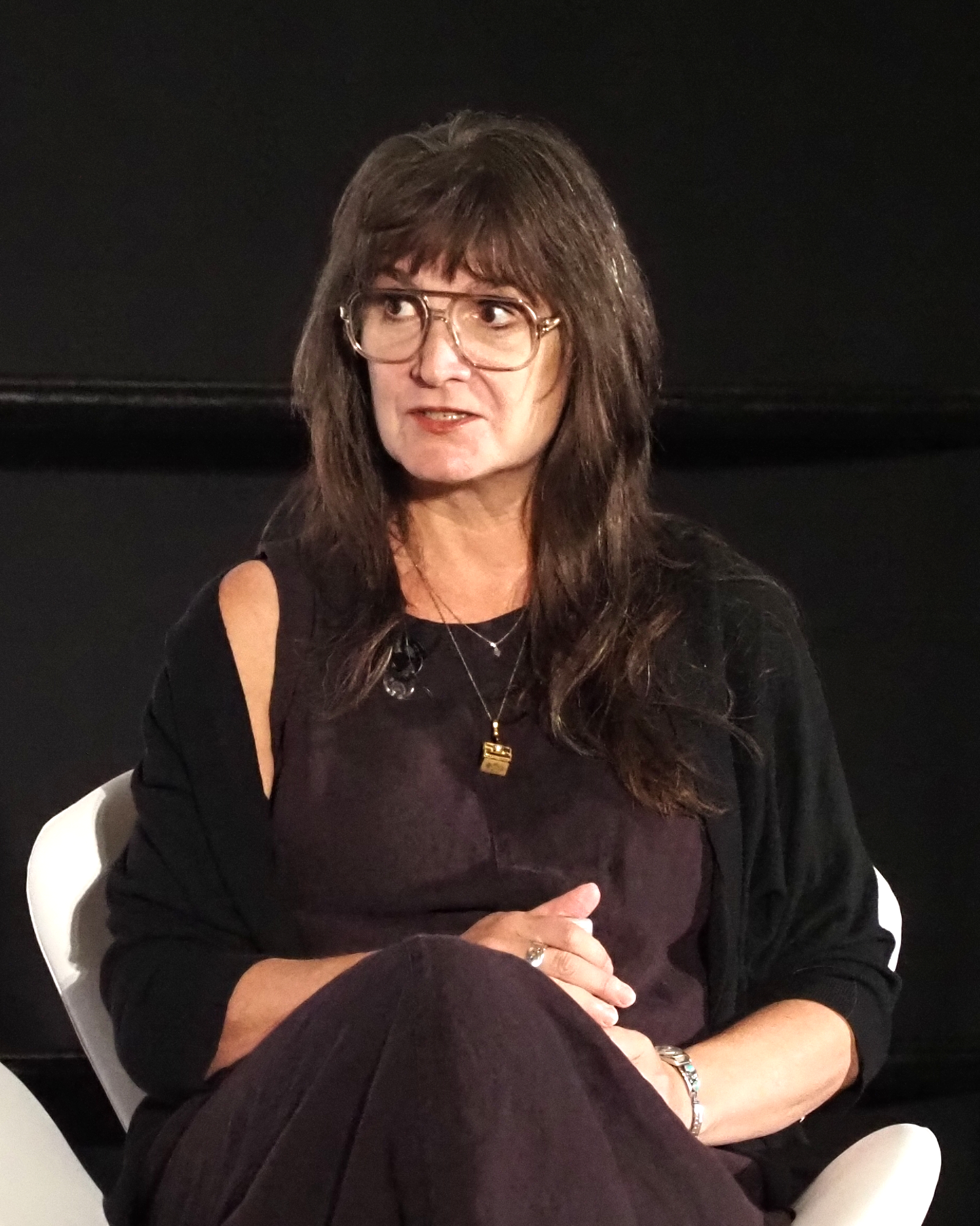

Sasha Waters also known as Sasha Waters Freyer, is an American documentary and experimental filmmaker, feminist and educator.

She has produced and directed over twenty films, most of which originate in 16mm. Her films have screened at the Brooklyn Museum, the Museum of the Moving Image, Union Docs and the Gene Siskel Film Center. Selected festivals include IMAGES in Toronto, the Telluride Film Festival, Rencontres Internationales Traverse Vidéo and International Film Festival Rotterdam.

She has had solo retrospectives of her films at Fisura Festival Internacional de Cine y Video Experimental in Mexico City, Microscope Gallery in Chelsea, and The Brattle in Cambridge. She is also a Professor of Photography and Film at VCU School of the Arts in Richmond, Virginia.

== Early life and education ==
Sasha Waters was born in Brooklyn and educated at the University of Michigan and the School of Visual Arts in New York City, where she earned her BFA in Photography in 1991. She earned her MFA in Film & Media Arts from Temple University in Philadelphia where she studied with filmmakers Lynne Sachs and Rea Tajiri.

== Career ==
Waters began her career working for icons of the '90s film scene in New York: Michael Almereyda, Barbara Kopple, Hal Hartley, and Ang Lee among them. Her academic career began at the University of Iowa in 2000, where she taught until the end of 2012. From 2013 to 2019, she was the Chair of the highly ranked VCU School of the Arts Department of Photography + Film where she is currently a Professor.

Waters co-directed her first film, Whipped (1998), with Iana Porter. A 16mm documentary portrait of three professional New York dominatrixes, Whipped premiered at the Philadelphia Festival of World Cinema, screened at the 1998 Chicago Underground Film Festival, and was called a "likable, low-key demystification of a potentially lurid subject," by Variety. Her next film, Razing Appalachia chronicled a years-long struggle against the expansion of a mountaintop removal mine by Arch Coal in rural West Virginia. Writing about the film in The New Yorker when it aired on the PBS series Independent Lens in 2003, Nancy Franklin wrote that it was a good example of "what makes public TV valuable."

Waters' 2010 film Chekhov for Children documents a full-length production of Anton Chekhov's Uncle Vanya staged in 1979 at Symphony Space on Manhattan's Upper West Side. Directed by Phillip Lopate, the play's cast and crew were made up entirely of 5th and 6th grade students from P.S. 75 on Manhattan's Upper West Side. Chekhov for Children premiered in the US at the Telluride Film Festival and at the International Film Festival Rotterdam. It was listed as one of the "Best Undistributed Films" of the year in the IndieWire Annual Critics Survey, 2010. In August 2026, The New York Times recommended Chekhov for Children as a "streaming pick," asking, "Why is this wonderful documentary not better known?"

Waters' feature documentary Garry Winogrand: All Things Are Photographable screened theatrically and at festivals in 2018, was called one of the year's best by The New Yorker's Richard Brody, and won a Special Jury Prize in the Documentary Competition at the SXSW Film Festival. The film aired on the PBS series American Masters in April 2019.

Since 2022, Waters has completed a trilogy of experimental short films that turn an anti-colonial and feminist lens onto the history of photography and cinema – cyanotypes in Ghost Protists, magic lantern glass slides in Fragile, and popular romance in Ashes of Roses. They have screened at more than sixty festivals, museums and galleries around the world, including the Seattle International Film Festival, Chicago Underground, Festival Internacional de Curtas de São Paolo, and Uppsala Short Film Festival, International Competition.

Waters is the director, producer and co-editor of the 2026 feature documentary, Mary Oliver: Saved by the Beauty of the World, a co-production between Pieshake Pictures and American Masters. Mary Oliver premiered on the Opening Night of the 2026 True/False Film Festival, had its international premiere at the Melbourne International Film Festival, and was released in more than fifty theaters across the U.S. and Canada by esteemed arthouse distributor Kino Lorber. The film had its broadcast debut on the PBS series American Masters on August 25, 2026.

== Awards and honors ==
- Fellow, MacDowell 1999, 2002, 2017
- Media Arts grants from the NEA, 2007, 2015, 2020
- 2004 Yaddo residency
- 2014 Virginia Center for the Creative Arts residency
- 2016 Helen Hill Award, Orphan Film Symposium
- 2016 Winner, Best in Show, New Waves, Virginia Museum of Contemporary Art
- 2018 Special Jury Prize, SXSW Film Festival, Garry Winogrand: All Things are Photographable
- 2019 Catapult Film Fund grant,Trouble Don't Last
- 2019-20 VMFA Fellowship, Virginia Museum of Fine Arts
- 2021 Denver Film Society MOFFOM grant, Trouble Don't Last
- 2024 NEH Award, Mary Oliver
- 2025 Core Residency, Millay Arts
- 2026-27 VMFA Fellowship
- 2026 Athens International Film + Video Festival Research Award for Mary Oliver

== Filmography ==
- Whipped (1998), co-produced with Iana Porter – documentary, 60 mins
- This Existence is Material (2003)
- Razing Appalachia (2003) – documentary, 72 mins
- The Waiting Time (2005)
- Her Heart is Washed in Water and then Weighed (2006)
- This American Gothic (2008)
- You Can See the Sun in Late December (2010)
- Chekhov for Children (2010) – documentary
- An Incomplete History of the Travelogue, 1925 (2012)
- Our Summer Made Her Light Escape (2012)
- An Incomplete History of Pornography, 1979 (2013)
- Burn Out the Day (2014)
- A Partial History of the Natural World, 1965 (2015)
- Garden of Stone (2015)
- dragons & seraphim (2017)
- Garry Winogrand: All Things are Photographable (2018) – documentary
- Respiration (2019)
- Fragile (2022)
- Ashes of Roses (2023)
- Ghost Protists (2024)
- Mary Oliver: Saved by the Beauty of the World (2026)
