= List of photographic processes =

A list of photographic processing techniques.

== Color ==
- Agfacolor
  - Ap-41 process (pre-1978 Agfa color slides; 1978-1983 was a transition period when Agfa slowly changed their color slide films from AP-41 to E6)
- Anthotype
- Autochrome Lumière, 1903
- Carbon print, 1862
- Chromogenic positive (Ektachrome)
  - E-3 process
  - E-4 process
  - E-6 process
- Chromogenic negative
  - C-41 process
  - RA-4 process
- Dufaycolor
- Dye destruction
  - Cibachrome
  - Ilfochrome
- Dye-transfer process
- Finlaycolor
- Heliochrome
- Kinemacolor
- Kodachrome
  - K-12 process
  - K-14 process
- Lippmann plate, 1891
- One-light

== Black and white (monochrome) ==
=== A ===
- Abration tone
- Acetate film
- Albertype
- Albumen print, 1850
- Algraphy
- Ambrotype
- Amphitype
- Amylotype
- Anaglyph
- Anthotype
- Anthrakotype
- Archertype
- Argentotype
- Argyrotype
- Aristo paper
- Aristotype
- Aristo
- Artotype
- Atrephograph
- Atrograph
- Aurotype
- Autotype (photographic process)

=== B ===
- Barrieotype
- Baryta coated paper
- Bayard process
- Bichromate process
- Bichromated gelatin
- Bichromated gum arabic
- Bichromatic albumen
- Bitumen of Judea, 1826
- Breyertype
- Bromide paper
- Bromoil process, 1907

=== C ===
- Caffenol
- Calotype, 1841
- Cameo
- Carbon print, 1855
- Carbro Print
- Carbro
- Casein pigment
- Catalysotype
- Catalisotype
- Catatype
- Cellulose diacetate negative
- Cellulose nitrate negative
- Cellulose triacetate negative
- Ceroleine
- Chalkotype
- Charbon Velour
- Chlorobromide paper
- Chromatype
- Chripotype
- Chrysotype, 1842
- Chrystollotype
- Cliché verre
- Collodion paper
- Collodion process, 1851
- Collotype, 1855
- Contact print
- Contact sheet
- Contretype
- Copper Photogravure
- Crystoleum
- Crystal photo 1850
- Cyanotype, 1842

=== D ===
- Daguerreotype, 1839
- Dallastype
- Diaphanotype
- Diazotype
- dr5 chrome B&W positive process
- Dry collodion negative
- Dry collodion process
- Dry plate
- Dye coupler process
- Dye destruction process
- Dye diffusion transfer process
- Dye transfer print

=== E ===
- Ectograph
- Ectographe
- Electrotype
- Energiatype
- Enamaline
- Enamel photograph

=== F ===
- Feertype
- Ferroprussiate paper
- Ferrotype
- Fluorotype

=== G ===
- Gaslight paper
- Gaudinotype
- Gelatino-Bromide emulsions, 1875
- Gelatin-silver process
- Gem tintype
- Gum bichromate
- Gum Bichromate Print
- Gum Dichromate
- Gum over platinum
- Gum printing = *Photogravure

=== H ===
- Hallotype
- Heliography
- Heliotype
- Hellenotype
- Hillotype
- Hyalotype, 1850
- Hydrotype
- Hypersensitization
- Highgrid, 2014

=== I ===
- Inkodye
- Intermediate negative
- Internegative
- Iron salt process
- Ivorytype, 1855

=== K ===
- Kallitype

=== L ===
- Lambertype
- Leggotype
- LeGray
- Levytype
- Linograph

=== M ===
- Mariotype
- Meisenbach process
- Melainotype
- Melanograph
- Metotype
- Mordançage

=== O ===
- Oil Print Process
- Opalotype
- Ozobrom process
- Ozobrome
- Ozotype
- Ozotype process

=== P ===
- Palladiotype, 1914
- Palladium processing
- Pannotype
- Paper negative
- Paynetype
- Photocollography
- Photogram
- Photogravure
- Photolithography
- Photosculpture
- Phototypesetting
- Physautotype
- Pinatype process
- Platinotype, 1873
- Playertype
- Plumbeotype, developed by John Plumbe
- Photo-crayotype

=== R ===
- Rayograph

=== S ===
- Salt print
- Self-toning paper
- Siderotype
- Silver bromide
- Silver chloride collodion
- Simpsontype
- Sphereotype
- Stand development
- Stanhope
- Stannotype
- Sun printing

=== T ===
- Talbotype
- Tintype or Ferrotype
- Tithnotype
- Transferotype

=== U ===
- Uranium print

=== V ===
- Van Dyke
- Vesicular film

=== W ===
- Wash-off Relief
- Wet collodion plate
- Wet collodion process
- Wet plate process
- Woodburytype
- Wothlytype

=== Z ===
- Ziatype
