= Siderotype =

Iron-based photographic process

Siderotype is an iron-based photographic print. The term was coined by Sir John Frederick William Herschel.

== List of siderotype processes ==
A list of processes defined as siderotypes is as follows: amphitype, argentotype, argyrotype, aurotype, breath print, Brown Line, chromatic photo, chrysotype, cyanotype, ferrogallic process, FerroBlend, kallitype, kelaenotype, Nakahara's process, palladiotype, Pellet print, Phipson's process, platinotype, printout platinum, satista print, sepia platinotype, sepiatype and vandyke.
