= Chrysotype =

Photographic process invented by John Herschel

Chrysotype (also known as a chripotype) is a photographic process invented by John Herschel in 1842, though it was eclipsed in popularity by Henry Fox Talbot's calotype process. Named from the Greek for "gold", χρυσός, it uses gold chloride to record images on paper. Gold-based printing processes have been devised by other practitioners on many occasions, before and after Herschel's, with varying success. They include Robert Hunt's 1841 'gold process', Thomas Hennah's 1852 'gold prints', and Alfred Jarman's 1897 aurotype process.

== Processes ==
=== Herschel's process and derivatives ===
Herschel's system involved coating paper with ferric citrate, exposing it to the sun in contact with an etching used as mask, then developing the print with a chloroaurate solution (made by dissolving gold in aqua regia). This did not provide continuous-tone photographs. Due to inherent problems of fogging, excessive contrast and uncontrollable colours, the process never came into wide use, and only about 22 original chrysotypes survive, all by Herschel, in archives in Oxford, London and Texas.

A number of people have attempted to replicate Herschel's original method, including William Russell Young III in 1981 and Owen Davies in 1997. The chemist Mike Ware, then a lecturer at the University of Manchester, perfected a new chrysotype process in 1989 after six years of research. It gives gold images in a wide range of colours, including pink, magenta, brown, purple, violet, blue and green, depending on the size and shape of the gold nanoparticles, and such gold images are very light-fast. In 2006, 164 years after Herschel's work with gold printing, photographers Liam Lawless and Robert Wolfgang Schramm published a formula based on Herschel's process.

=== Processes based on ziatype ===
Following the introduction of Richard Sullivan's ziatype process in 1996, a variant of the palladiotype process which uses lithium palladium complex salts and ferric ammonium oxalate to produce photographic images, many photographers began experimenting successfully with substituting gold for part of the palladium: gold chloride can be used in place of part of the palladium salt to augment colour and tone, and may replace as much as 80 percent of the lithium chloropalladite.

== See also ==
- Siderotype – Iron-based photographic process
- Monochrome printmaking
- Alternative process – Non-traditional or non-commercial photographic printing process
