= Alternative process =

Non-traditional or non-commercial photographic printing process

In photography, an alternative process is any chemical process that is considered primarily historical. Because of how dominant the silver gelatin process has become, "alternative" is largely understood as processes other than silver gelatin film or photo paper. Examples include processes still based on silver salts—like collodion processes or salt prints—as well as completely alien chemistries based on iron salts—like the cyanotype or platinum print—or dichromate salts—gum and carbon printing.

Silver gelatin is preferred in large part for its relatively high sensitivity to light. Although some alternative processes like the Daguerreotype or the calotype require just a little more lighting, or a longer exposure to form an image, many other processes are unable to form images quickly enough with visible light to be useful for photography, and are instead used as printing processes. These processes may require either a silver gelatin negative or a "digital negative" (a transparency printed on a digital printer) to be used to make contact prints from.

== Examples ==
- Anthotype – Image created using photosensitive material from plants
- Chrysotype – Photographic process invented by John Herschel
- Daguerreotype – Early photographic technique
- Gum bichromate and other pigmented dichromated colloids which are used to directly generate a photographic print
- Platinum and palladium processes
- Carbon print and various similar processes which use a non-sensitive intermediate layer to generate a photographic image
- Van Dyke brown, cyanotype and various other iron-based processes
- Wet and dry plate collodion processes based in silver using a hand coated emulsion on a tin or aluminum (tintype) or glass (ambrotype) base
- Resinotype and several similar processes which rely upon unexposed dichromated colloids to accept an insoluble pigment
- Inkodye, a light-oxidized vat dye.
- Oil pigment processes, such as bromoil process
- Other processes which use silver halide but in various different ways other than the typical silver-gelatin formula, such as salt print
- Any number of processes which use more exotic materials, such as uranium chloride, gold chloride, and any number of other salts to directly or indirectly generate a photographic print

== See also ==
- List of photographic processes
- Lo-fi photography
