= Monochrome =

Composed of one color

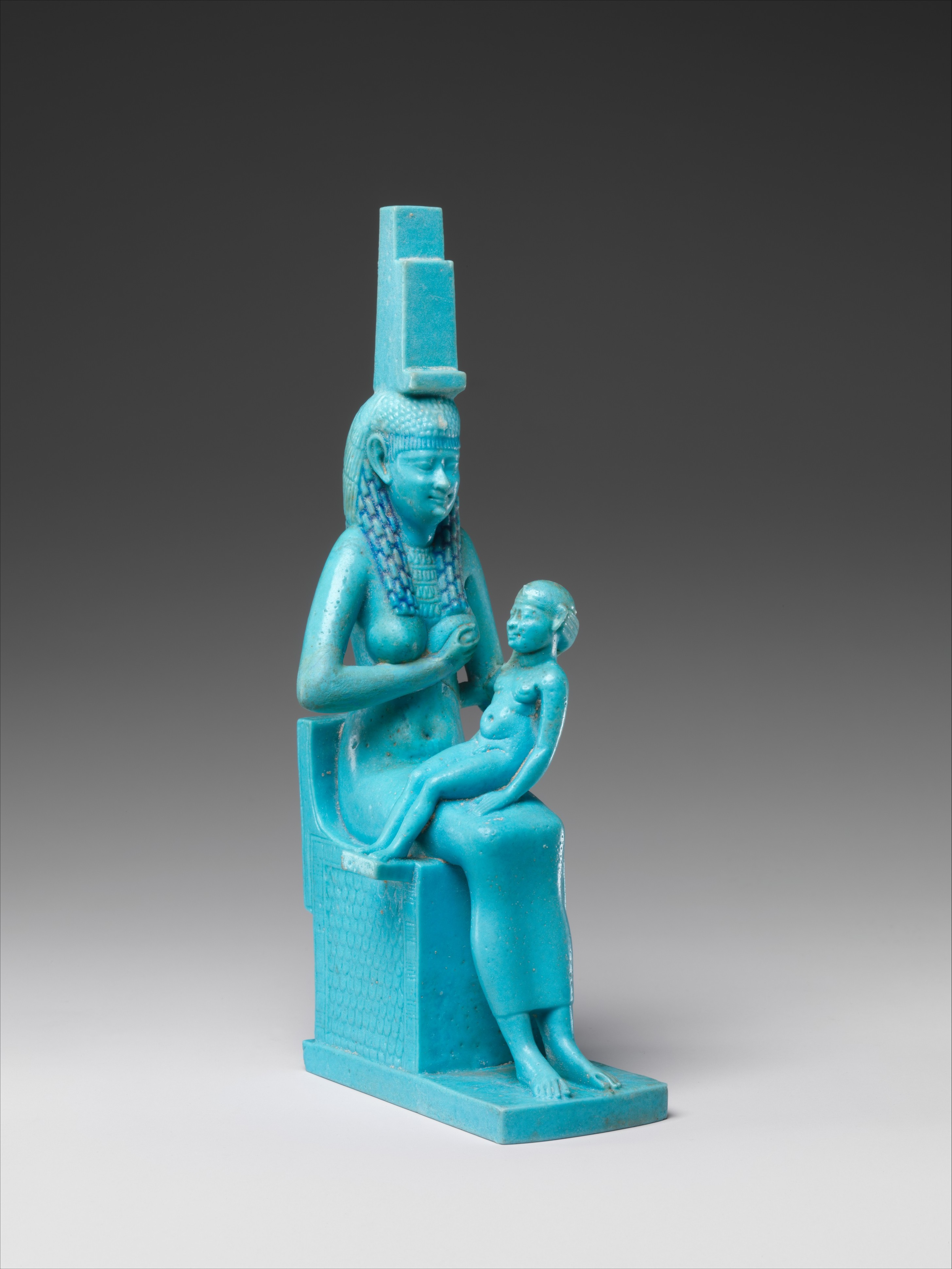
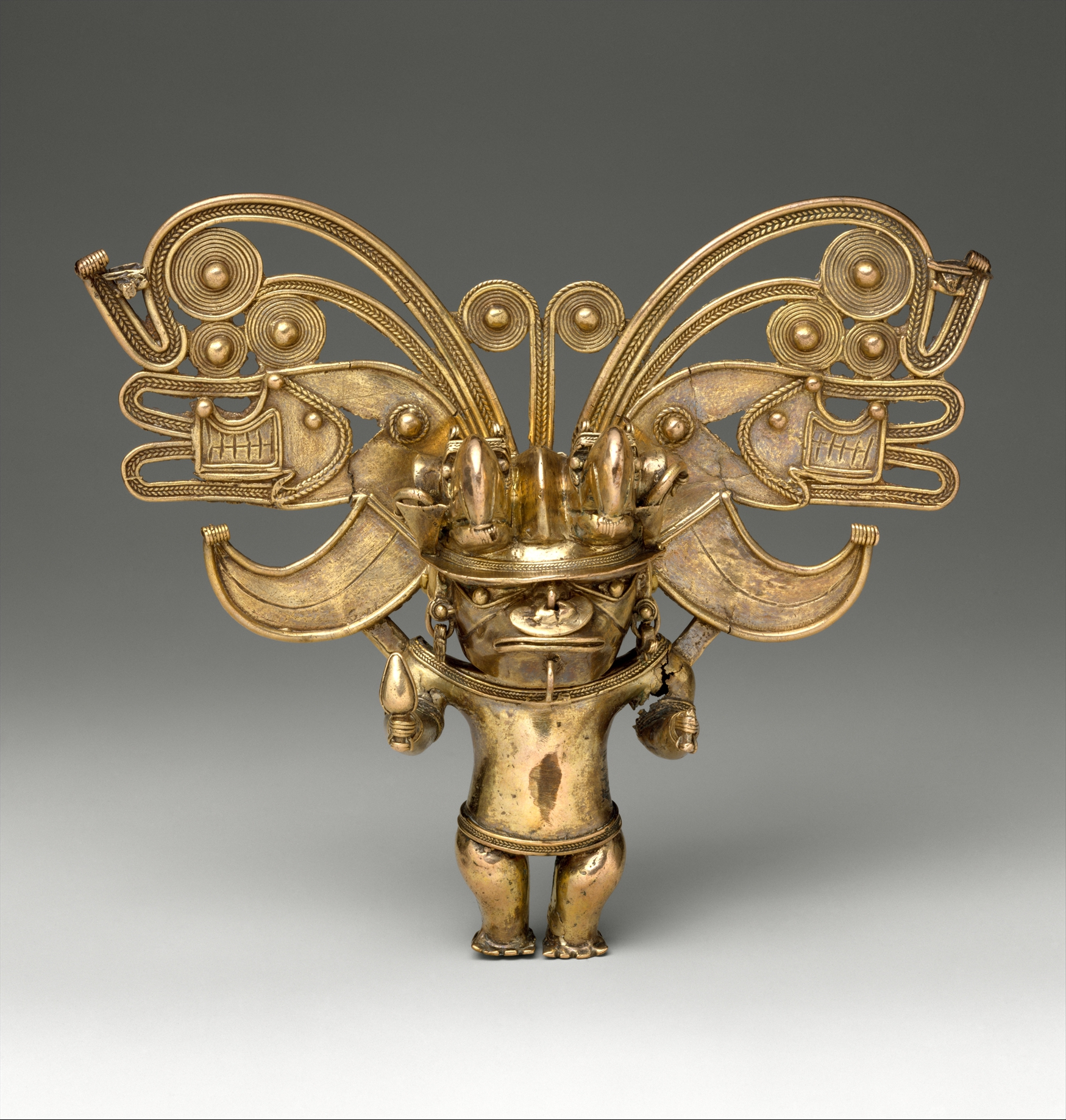
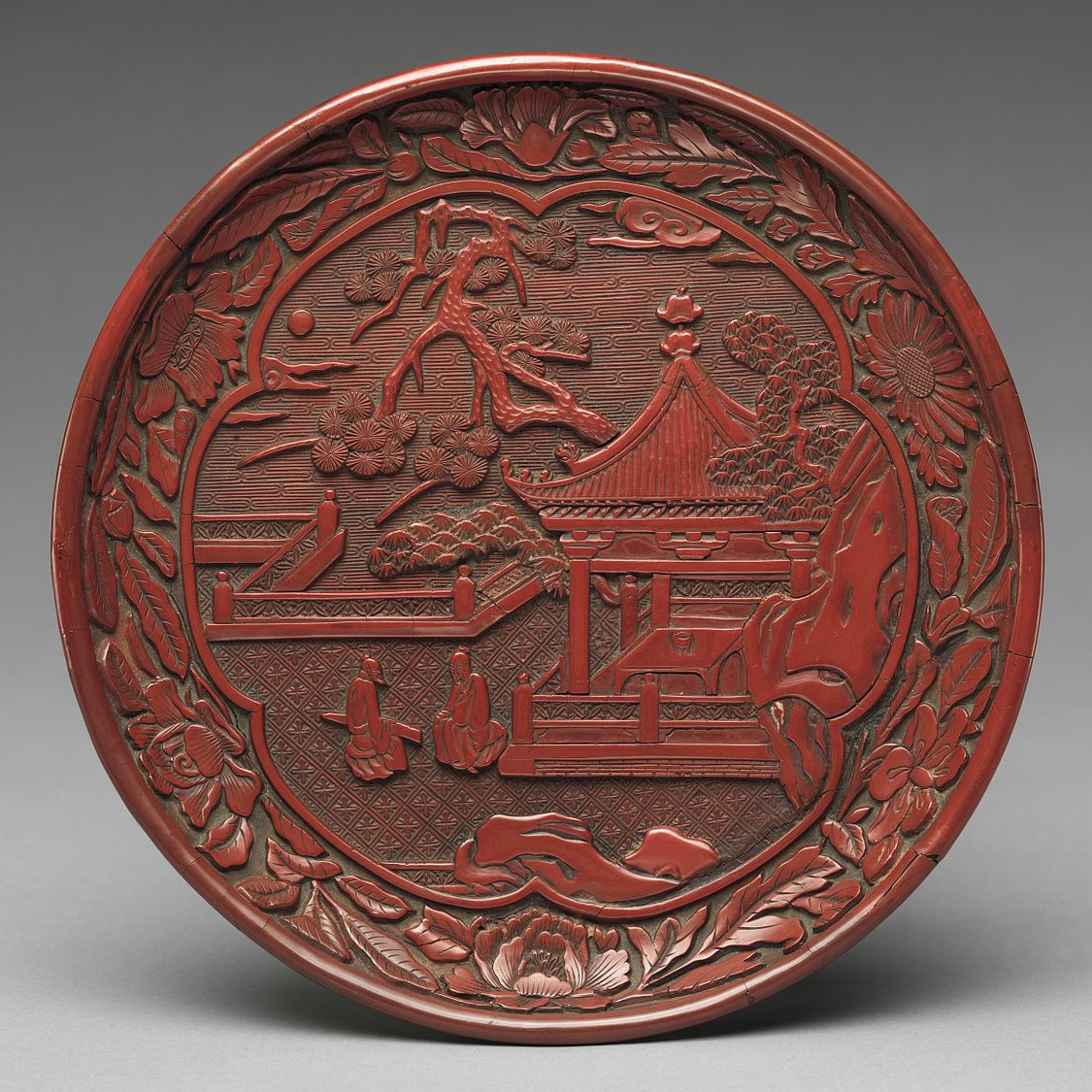
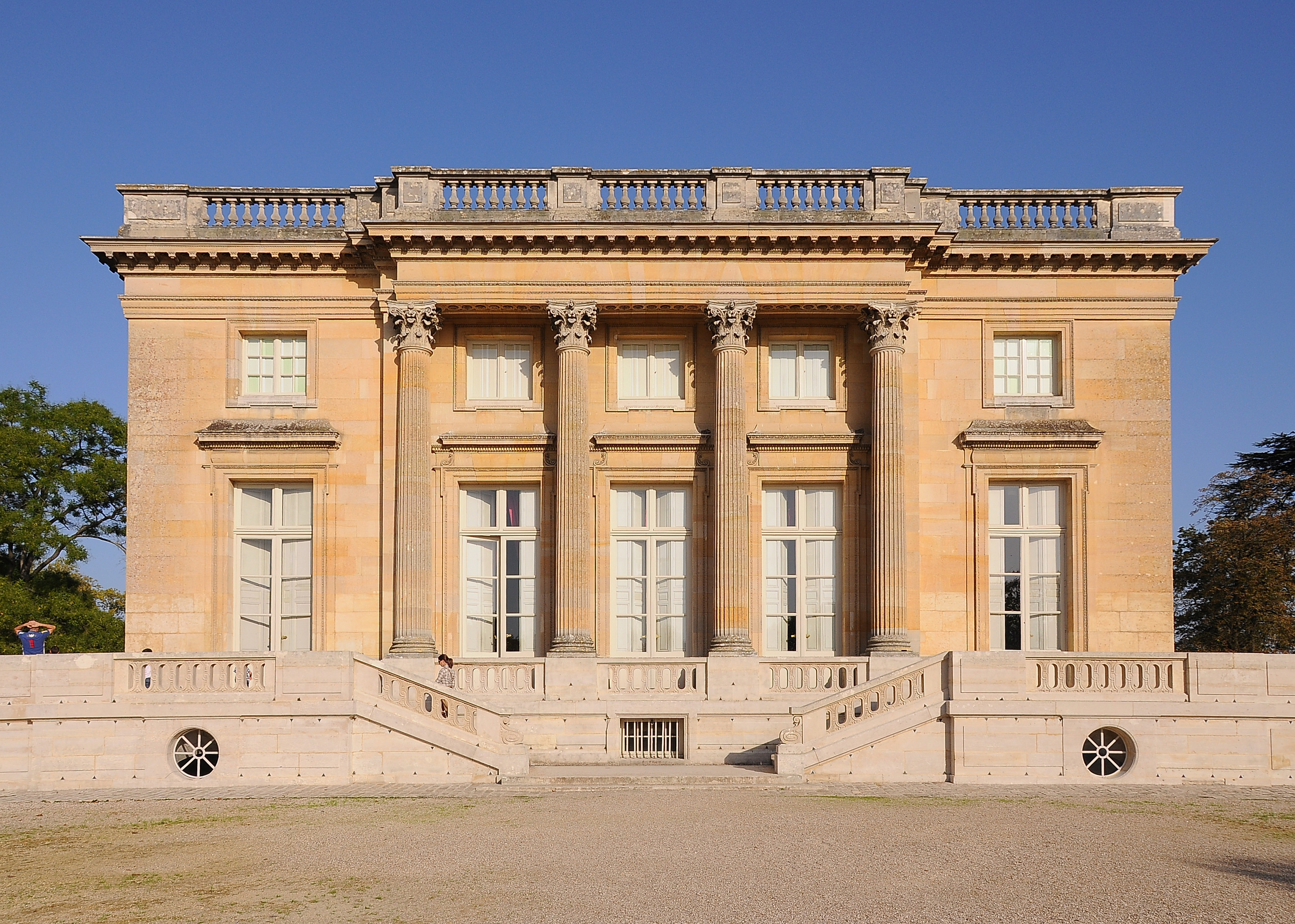
Multiple examples of monochrome artworks throughout history: an Ancient Egyptian faience statuette of Isis and Horus, 332–30 BC; a gold Tairona pendant, 10th–16th century; a Chinese carved red lacquer, late 14th century; and the Neoclassical Petit Trianon in Versailles, France, by Ange-Jacques Gabriel, 1764

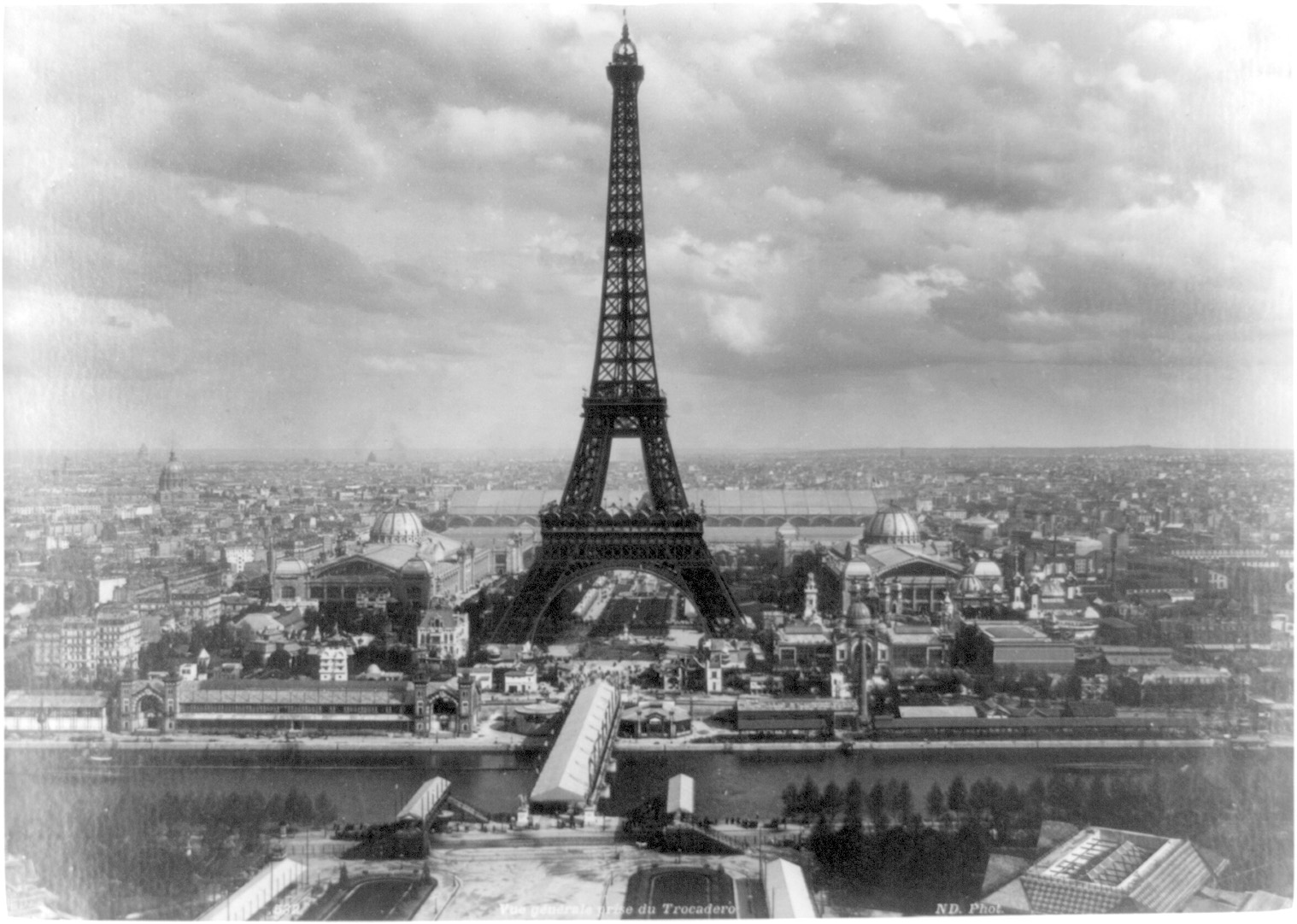
Black-and-white monochrome: the Eiffel Tower during the 1889 Exposition Universelle

Color monochrome: night-vision devices usually produce monochrome images, typically in shades of green.

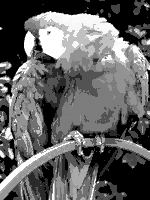
A photograph of a macaw rendered with a monochrome palette of a limited number of shades

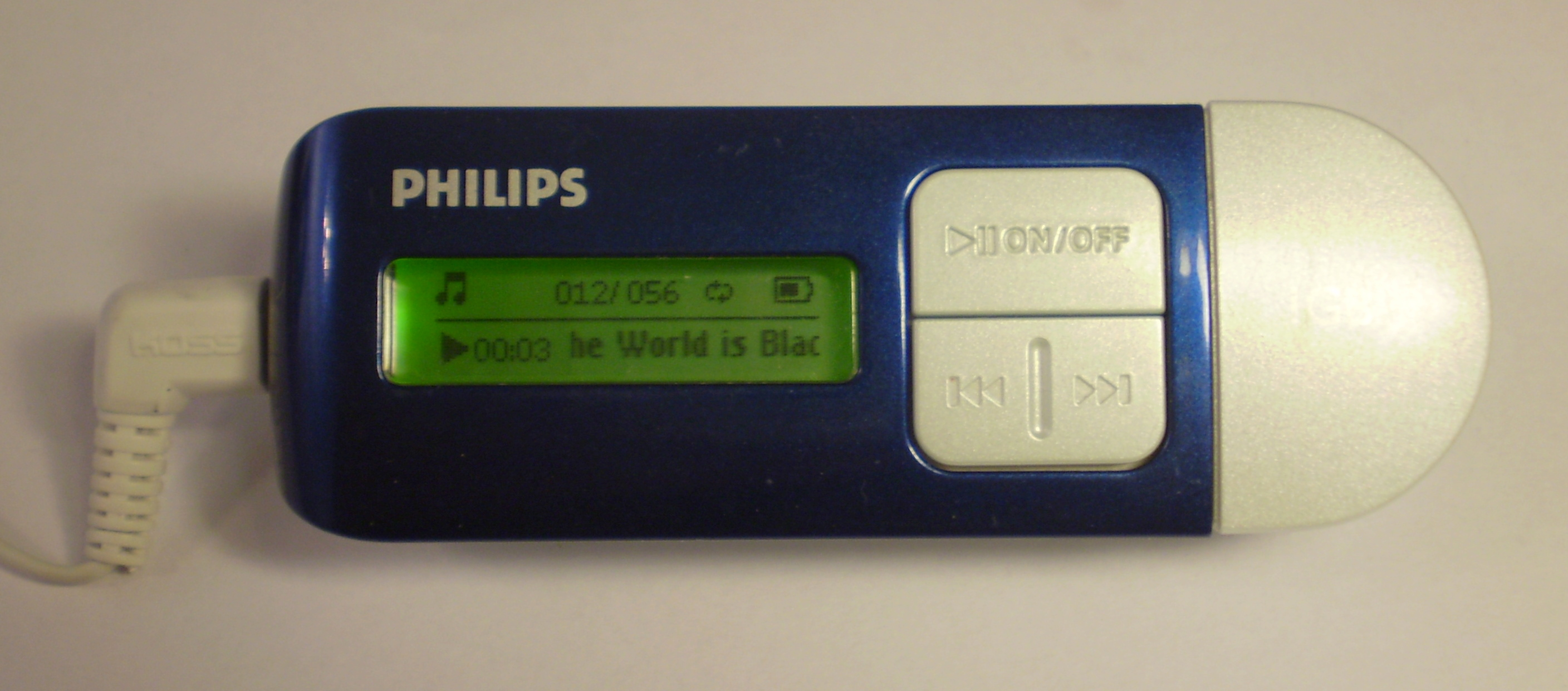
A Philips branded digital audio player with a monochrome display and green backlight, common on older devices including mobile phones and handheld game systems

A monochrome or monochromatic image, object or palette is composed of one color (or values of one color). Images using only shades of grey are called grayscale (typically digital) or black-and-white (typically analog). In physics, monochromatic light refers to electromagnetic radiation that contains a narrow band of wavelengths, which is a distinct concept.

== Application ==
Of an image, the term monochrome is usually taken to mean the same as black and white or, more likely, grayscale, but may also be used aying tones from light tan to dark brown or cyanotype ("blueprint") images, and early photographic methods such as daguerreotypes, ambrotypes, and tintypes, each of which may be used to produce a monochromatic image.

In computing, monochrome has two meanings:

- it may mean having one color which is either on or off (also known as a binary image),
- allowing shades of that color.

A monochrome computer display is able to display only a single color, often green, amber, red or white, and often also shades of that color.

In film photography, monochrome is typically the use of black-and-white film. Originally, all photography was done in monochrome. Although color photography was possible even in the late 19th century, easily used color films, such as Kodachrome, were not available until the mid-1930s.

In digital photography, monochrome is the capture of only shades of black by the sensor, or by post-processing a color image to present only the perceived brightness by combining the values of multiple channels (usually red, blue, and green). The weighting of individual channels may be selected to achieve a desired artistic effect; if only the red channel is selected by the weighting then the effect will be similar to that of using a red filter on panchromatic film. If the red channel is eliminated and the green and blue combined then the effect will be similar to that of orthochromatic film or the use of a cyan filter on panchromatic film. The selection of weighting so provides a wide variety of artistic expression in the final monochrome image.

For production of an anaglyph image the original color stereogram source may first be reduced to monochrome in order to simplify the rendering of the image. This is sometimes required in cases where a color image would render in a confusing manner given the colors and patterns present in the source image and the selection filters used (typically red and its complement, cyan).

== Color scheme ==
Example of a monochromatic color scheme

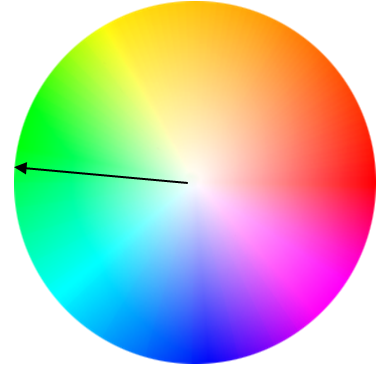
Monochromatic color gradient on color wheel

A monochromatic color scheme comprises (tones, tints, and shades) of a single hue. Tints are achieved by adding white, thereby increasing lightness; Shades are achieved by adding black, thereby decreasing lightness; Tones are achieved by adding gray, thereby decreasing colorfulness.

Monochromatic color schemes provide opportunities in art and visual communications design as they allow for a greater range of contrasting tones that can be used to attract attention, create focus and support legibility.

The use of a monochromatic color provides a strong sense of visual cohesion and can help support communication objectives through the use of connotative color. The relative absence of hue contrast can be offset by variations in tone and the addition of texture.

Monochromatic in science means consisting of a single wavelength of light or other radiation (lasers, for example, usually produce monochromatic light), or having or appearing to have only one color (in comparison to polychromatic). That means according to science the true monochromatic images can be strictly created only of shades of one color fading to black.

However, monochromatic also has another meaning similar to "boring" or "colorless" which sometimes leads to creating a design composed from true monochromatic color shades (one hue fading to black), and the colors created from the one hue but faded to all wavelengths (to white). This is not monochromatic in the strictly scientific meaning of the word. In fact, monochrome in the art world can be as complicated or even more complicated than other polychromatic art.

== In physics ==
In physics, monochromatic light is electromagnetic radiation of a single wavelength. While no source of electromagnetic radiation is purely monochromatic, in practice, it is usually used to describe very narrowband sources such as monochromated or laser light. The degree of monochromaticity can be defined by the spectral linewidth. A device which isolates a narrow band of light from a broadband source is called a monochromator.

== See also ==
- Duotone, the use of two ink colors in printing
- Halftone, the use of black and white in a pattern that is perceived as shades of grey (may be extended also to color images)
- Monochromacy, a type of color vision deficiency
- Monochromatic color
- Monochrome monitor, used with computers
- Monochrome photography, also known as black-and-white photography
- Monochrome painting, a style of painting that uses a single color (excluding shades thereof)
- Monochrome printmaking, printing styles that generate black-and-white images
- Polychrome, of multiple colors, the opposite of monochrome
