= Eshbaugh =

Eshbaugh is a surname and may refer to:

- Mark Eshbaugh (born 1974), American artist, author, educator, and musician
- Ted Eshbaugh (1906-1969), American animation filmmaker
- W. Hardy Eshbaugh (born 1936), Professor Emeritus of Botany at Miami University
