= Arentz =

Arentz is a surname. Notable people with the surname include:

- Bjarne Arentz (1928–2017), Norwegian alpine skier
- Charles Arentz (1878–1968), Norwegian sailor
- Dick Arentz (born 1935), American fine art photographer and author
- Frederik Arentz (1702–1779), Norwegian Lutheran bishop
- Hans Severin Arentz (1806–1875), Norwegian politician
- Samuel S. Arentz (1879–1934), American politician
- Steven J. Arentz (born 1951), American politician
