= Mark Eshbaugh =

American artist, author and musician (born 1974)

Mark Eshbaugh (born 1974) is an American artist, author, educator, and musician. He has specialized in alternative photography processes such as platinum/palladium and chrysotype printing, and gum bichromate, cyanotype and Mordançage processing. He holds a BFA degree from the University of Massachusetts Lowell and an MFA degree from the Savannah College of Art and Design.

Eshbaugh has contributed formulas to the chrysotype process that allows for various color and contrast controls. His contributions to the mordançage process include research into how different developing agents and their dilutions will result in different tonalities in the various emulsions of silver gelatin printing papers.

== Publications ==
His artwork has been included in textbooks including both editions of The Elements of Photography by Angela Faris-Belt, Photographic Possibilities, 3rd edition by Robert Hirsch Leanne McPhee, Chrysotype: A Contemporary Guide to Photographic Printing in Gold, 1st Edition,. Christina Z. Anderson's The Experimental Darkroom: Contemporary Uses of Traditional Black & White Photographic Materials, 1st Edition,. and Donald Nelson's Kallitype, Vandyke Brown, and Argyrotype: A Step-by-Step Manual of Iron-Silver Processes Highlighting Contemporary Artists, 1st Edition.

== Notable exhibitions and awards ==
Eshbaugh's artworks were included in the Reus Institut Municipal d’Accio Cultural Biennals Internacionals de Fotografia Medalla Gaudi in 2001 and 2003. This bi-annual exhibition features fine art photographers from around the world working in alternative photographic processes (such as platinum Printing, gum bichromate, etc.). At each biennial, they award the Medalla Gaudi award to a few artists and purchase their work for the Institut Municipal d’Accio Cultural's permanent collection. Eshbaugh was awarded the Medalla Gaudi and his work added to the permanent collection in 2003.

Eshbaugh's artwork was included in the 2002-03 traveling exhibition "The American River." Eshbaugh was named the 2013 Distinguished Alumni from the University of Massachusetts Lowell by the Independent University Alumni Association at Lowell. His work was also featured in the Danforth Art Museum's 2015 New England Photo Biennial.

== Personal life ==
Mark has taught for colleges and universities including Bridgewater State University, University of Massachusetts Lowell, Montserrat College of Art, University of New Hampshire, Plymouth State University, Anna Maria College, and Saint Anselm College.
