= Ted Preuss =

American photographer (born 1962)

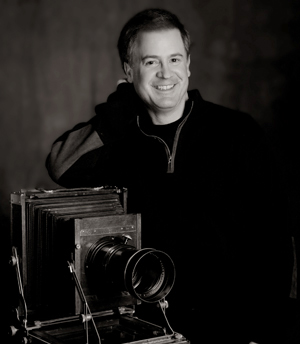
- Ted Preuss
- Born: Theodore Preuss; 1962 (age 62–63); Aurora, Colorado, US
- Known for: Photography

Ted Preuss (born 1962) is an American photographer who lives in Chicago, Illinois, best known for his black-and-white photographs and alternative processes which include platinum printing and wet plate collodion tintypes. Preuss photographic work range from nude studies to still life.

== Life and career ==
Ted Preuss got his first camera in 1969 and became fascinated with the medium. After high school, he began working as a commercial photographer assistant in Denver, Colorado.

In 1982, Preuss started his career as an architectural photographer in Boston and San Francisco which lasted over a decade. 1996 he decided to take a break from architectural photography and explored the world of furniture design in Chicago, Illinois.

Preuss primarily works with vintage large format film cameras, several of which are over 100 years old.

== Publications ==
- Simple Beauty – Studies in Self-Reference, Blurb Books, 2008
- The Eastern Sierra Center for Photography series “Tales from the lens”, December 2013
- Sheridan Road Magazine, Aug/Sept. 2013
- PH Magazine, July 2011, p 32-45
- ZOOM Magazine Issue #93, July 2009, p 26-31
- Chicago Sun-Times – cover photo Weekend Edition, April 25, 2008
- Large Format Journal, Spring 2006, p 12-18
- Art Review NewCity Magazine, 2008
