= Argyrotype =

Argyrotype is an iron-based silver printing process that produces brown images on plain paper. It is an alternative process derived from the Argentotype, Kallitype, and Van Dyke brown processes of the 19th century, but has greater simplicity, improved image stability, and longer sensitizer shelf-life. The Argyrotype process was developed by Mike Ware in the 1990s.

The core resource used is silver sulphamate (NH_{2}SO_{3}Ag) which can be prepared on site from sulphamic acid. The sensitizer used is very slow, so printing must be by contact with a large format negative, using an ultraviolet lamp or sunlight.

As with most alternative processes there is room for manipulating the process to achieve different effects, and since the image is produced on plain paper many drawing or print making processes can be combined with the original image.
