= William Willis (inventor) =

British inventor (1841–1923)

William Willis Jr. (1841–1923) was a British inventor who developed the platinum printing process, an early form of photography, based on the light sensitivity of platinum salts, originally discovered by John Herschel.

William Willis was the son of British engraver of landscapes, and inventor of the anilin printing, process William Willis. William (jnr.) worked in practical engineering at Tangyes, Birmingham, and at the Birmingham and Midland Bank. Willis made the first platinum print in 1873 and patented it, but the process was imperfect, attracting little interest. In 1874, the British Journal of Photography announced his Platinum Printing process. It gave a report of the process on 4 June 1875. By 1879 he had improved the process sufficiently to justify founding the Platinotype Company to market his papers.

He began marketing his pre-coated papers in 1880. Taking his cue from Daguerre's marketing practices with his Daguerreotypes, Willis sold licenses to photographers wanting to use his process, and then sold them the materials. In 1881 Willis received the Progress Medal of the London Photographic Society, and the gold medal of the International Inventions Exhibition in 1885.

He lived for many years in Bromley (Kent) and took a considerable interest in the nearby local cottage hospital to which he donated land and funds as well as buying their first X-ray machine. He was both Hon. Auditor and a Vice President of the Bromley Camera Club and continued his connection with them even after moving away in 1912.

== See also ==
- Palladiotype
- Photographic processes
