= Gum over platinum =

Historical chemical photographic process

Gum over platinum is a historical chemical photographic process, which was commonly used in art photography. It is a complex process, in which a specially treated platinum print photograph is coated with washes of gum arabic, then re-exposed to the same photographic negative. The finished process results in a sepia toned print, and is said to impart added luminosity and depth. It is sometimes called "pigment over platinum".

To sensitize the gum arabic it must first be placed in contact with ammonium or potassium dichromate. Gum arabic is not photosensitive by itself. To clear the chromic acid, the print is washed in 1% potassium metabisulfite after proper development in water. Interested individuals should read up on the process before attempting, as the chromic acids are very dangerous to work with.

The mechanics of the gum portion is not entirely known; what occurs is the exposed gum is hardened and becomes water-insoluble. Upon washing, the unexposed portions wash away, leaving the white paper exposed.
