= Jesse Genet =

American businesswoman (born 1987)

- Born: December 14, 1987 (age 38); Detroit, Michigan, US
- Education: ArtCenter College of Design
- Occupation: Entrepreneur
- Website: Lumi

Jesse Genet (born December 14, 1987) is an American businesswoman who is the co-founder and chief executive officer (CEO) of Lumi, a firm that produces packaging and other branded materials for ecommerce ventures.

== Early life and education ==
Genet was born and raised in the suburbs of Detroit, Michigan. Her mother was a school teacher and her father was an attorney. When she was 15, her mother divorced her father and later married a technology entrepreneur whom Genet credits with shaping her changing worldview. Her first entrepreneurial venture was printing T-shirts in the basement at age 16. This company became known as Inkodye, of which she became the CEO in 2010. She later attended the ArtCenter College of Design, where she met her future business partner and collaborator, Stephan Ango.

== Lumi ==
Genet founded Lumi in 2012 after several rounds of Kickstarter campaigns between 2009 and 2012. Despite failing to get a deal on the syndicated television series Shark Tank, Genet was able to finance her company's growth through Y Combinator. As of 2015, the company had over $2.5 million in sales throughout the United States and 20 other countries. Its customers include MeUndies, Parachute, and Tuft & Needle.

As of 2018, the company has launched 18,000 projects and shipped 25 million units of packaging items.

== Personal life ==
Genet is married to Ryan Hudson, the cofounder of Honey.
