= Max Doerner (artist) =

German artist

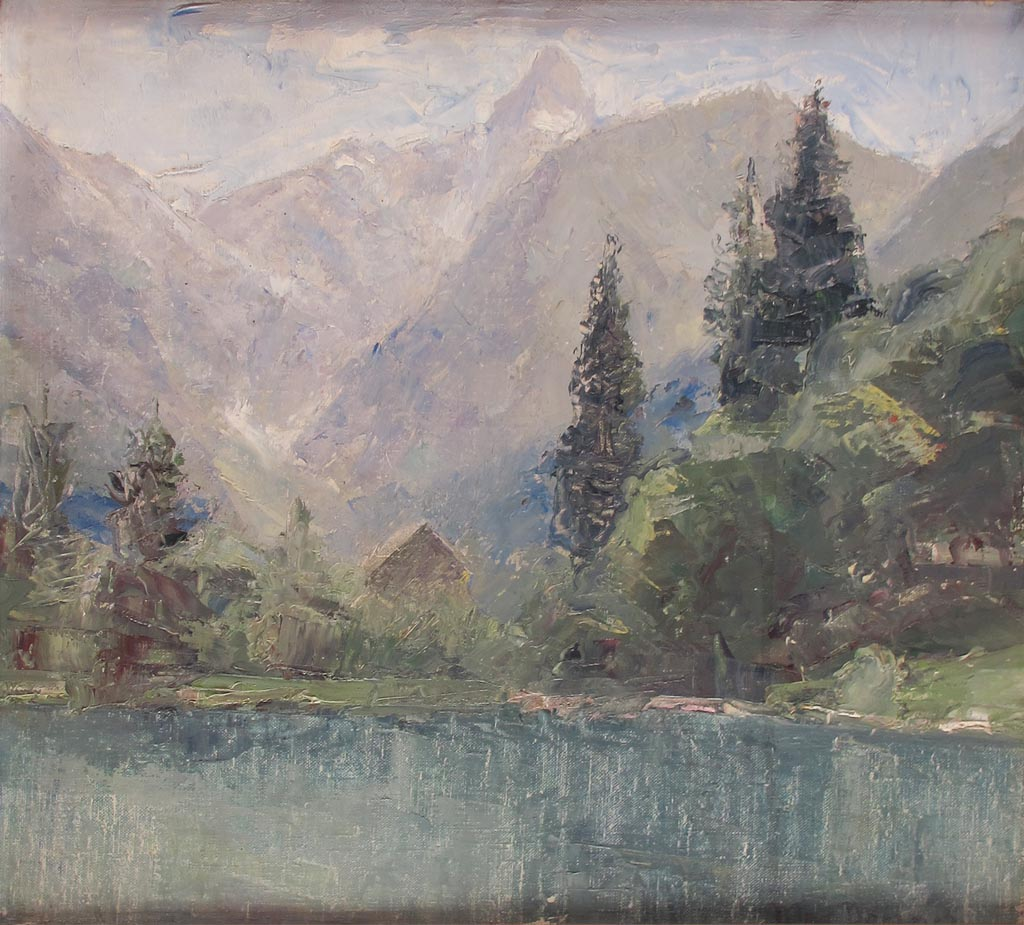
Mountain landscape in Summer

Max Doerner (1 April 1870 – 1 March 1939) was a German artist and art theorist.

Born in Burghausen in the Palatinate, Doerner was the son of an army officer. His artistic education was at the Academy of Fine Arts Munich where he studied under Johann Caspar Herterich and Wilhelm von Diez. His style was impressionistic. He travelled around Europe, in particular to the Low Countries and Italy, and studied the old techniques of painting. He is most notable for his work The Materials of the Artist and Their Use in Painting, first published in German in 1921, with its first English edition appearing in 1934.

His approach inspired the founding of the Doerner Institute.

For the last eighteen years of his life he was also an instructor at the Royal Bavarian Academy, where his students included Karl Gatermann the Younger. He died in Munich in 1939.

== See also ==
- List of German painters
- Mischtechnik
