= Sal Lopes =

American photographer and printer

Salvatore Lopes
- Education: University of Hartford
- Known for: Photography, Platinum print
- Notable work: Photographic printer of Horst P. Horst; The Wall: Images and Offerings From The Vietnam Veterans Memorial (1987)
- Awards: Anchor Award 2013
- Website: lopesphotographs.com

Salvatore Lopes is an American photographer and printer.

== Early life and education ==
Lopes received his BA and MA from the University of Hartford in Connecticut. After teaching in the Hartford school system and devising a photographic program to promote reading and writing skills, he joined Richard Benson's studio in Newport, Rhode Island, in the 1970s. There, exhibitions and edition portfolios were produced from images by Paul Strand and Edward Weston.

Later, Lopes continued the printing business on his own and specialized in the archival 19th century technique of platinum prints, developing his own style of hand-coated prints.

== Career ==
=== Photography ===
During the 1980s, Lopes created a body of personal work documenting the newly built Vietnam Veterans Memorial in Washington, DC, in which he focused on capturing the intense emotions of mourning, healing and loss among its visitors. Lopes’ work spanned over five years and ultimately culminated in his book, The Wall: Images and Offerings From The Vietnam Veterans Memorial and was displayed at the Chrysler Museum, International Center of Photography, the Art Institute of Chicago, and the San Francisco Museum of Art. Additionally, Lopes’ work was shown on the ABC television news show Nightline in 1986.

Lopes’ next project was another memorial, this time dealing with AIDS. He produced a documentary, focusing on three events: the AIDS quilt in Boston and Washington; the Buddy program of the AIDS Action Committee, which paired volunteer companions with those diagnosed with AIDS; the daily life of an adoptive family, where five siblings received home treatments for AIDS over the span of four years. There was a subsequent series of traveling exhibitions.

More recently, he has resumed his work in street photography. He also continues his abstract work titled Images of Water. Some works are printed in platinum, although Lopes has also experimented with digital imaging and color printing. Other projects include: surrealistic macro images, Newport Jazz, Images of Horses, Macro Images, and Tree Forms. His photographs are found in permanent museum collections.

Lopes has had experience as a workshop instructor, teaching at the Maine Photographic Workshops and Savannah Photographic Workshops, as well as in Turin, California (along with Cole Weston), and at his studios in Newport and Boston.

=== Printing ===
Lopes' range of printing ranges from Civil War photographers Mathew Brady and Alexander Gardner to contemporary photographers. His biggest client was Horst P. Horst until Horst's death. Lopes has printed the work of: Carrie Mae Weems, George Hoyningen-Huene, Alfred Stieglitz, Robert Mapplethorpe, Herb Ritts, Mary Ellen Mark, Ruth Bernhard, Helen Levitt, Robert Rauschenberg, George Platt Lynes, Anderson & Low, James Fee, Linda Connor, Lisette Model, Lotte Jacobi, Peter Lindbergh, Richard Gere, Greg Gorman, Mark Seliger, Keith Carter, Henry Horenstein, Philippe Halsman, Nadav Kander, Jill Freedman, and Louis Faurer.

He has had commissions from the Nickolas Muray Archives (portraits of Frida Kahlo), Aperture Foundation for David Wojnarowicz, the estate of Paul Strand, Edward Weston, Barbara Morgan, Dorothea Lange, Minor White, from the estate of Edward Weston, Life Gallery of Photography (Margaret Bourke-White), Vision Gallery (Ruth Bernhard, Judy Dater, Paul Caponigro, Otto Hagel, Hansel Mieth, Mario Cravo), the estate of Edward Weston, Staley-Wise Gallery, Fahey/Klein Gallery, Debra Heimerdinger Fine Art (David Halliday), Light Work, Camera Work, Berlin, and Roger Urban.

== Publications ==
- The Wall: Images and Offerings From The Vietnam Veterans Memorial. Collins, 1987
- Living with AIDS: A Photographic Journal. Bullfinch/Little Brown, 1994
- Life behind the Metaphor: Rudolf Nureyev and the Dutch National Ballet. The Nureyev Legacy Project, 2007

== Awards ==
- 2013: Anchor Award, University of Hartford's Alumni Association.

== Exhibitions ==
- Wadsworth Atheneum, Hartford, CT, 1974
- Washington Project for the Arts, Washington, DC, 1987
- The Wall: Photographed by Sal Lopes, Chrysler Museum of Art, Norfolk, VA 1987–1988
- San Francisco Museum of Modern Art, San Francisco, CA, 1988
- Carroll Reece Museum, East Tennessee State University, 1988
- The Art Institute of Chicago, Chicago, IL, 1988
- Addison Gallery of American Art, Andover, MA, 1989
- Aspen Art Museum, Aspen, CO, 1989
- Grove Gallery, University of California at San Diego, San Diego, CA, 1989
- The Indomitable Spirit, International Center of Photography (ICP) New York, 1990
- Vietnam Memorial, International Center of Photography (ICP) New York, 1990
- Arvada Center for the Arts and Humanities, Arvada, CO, 1990
- Living with AIDS, Chrysler Museum of Art, Norfolk, VA, 1994
- Williams College Museum of Art, Williamstown, MA, 1997
- Horse Attitudes, The Contemporary Art Center of Virginia, 1999
- Danforth Museum, Framingham, MA, 2000
- Musée de l'Élysée, Lausanne, Switzerland, 2002
- Reiss Engelhorn Museum, Mannheim, Germany, 2003
- Springfield Museum of Fine Arts, Springfield, MA
- Telfair Museum, Savannah, Georgia: Water Works

== Collections ==
- Chrysler Museum of Art, Norfolk, VA
