= Finlay colour process =

The Finlay colour process was an early additive colour photography process devised by an Irish woman named Clare Elizabeth Finlay which could produce a picture in natural colour with a single exposure.

== Description ==
The Finlay colour process was based on the theory of scientist Clerk Maxwell, who discovered in 1861 that all the colours in nature could be matched by the proper admixture of the three primary colours. It was on this principle that Mr. Finlay made a screen of geometric pattern comprising red, green and blue-violet squares in regular sequence. Patented by Finlay in 1906 and introduced in 1908 as the "Thames Colour Screen". It used a screen with a precise checkerboard of red, green, and blue elements as opposed to the random mosaic pattern used in the Autochrome system. This separate screen could be used with any type of panchromatic film or photographic plate to make a colour photograph.

In 1909 the "Thames Colour Plate" was released, which incorporated the filter screen and the emulsion in a single plate.

Both processes were abandoned after World War I, but improved versions were marketed under the name of Finlay Colour in 1929 and 1931. They were major rivals to Dufaycolor until the introduction of the subtractive materials in the mid-1930s.

== See also ==
- Finlaycolor
- Paget process
