= Dick Arentz =

American fine art photographer and author

Dick Arentz (born May 19, 1935) is an American fine art photographer and author, known for his textbook on platinum-palladium printing. Arentz's text book, Platinum & Palladium Printing, Focal Press. 1st edition (1999), 2nd edition (2004) "is known in online forums and industry magazines as the most comprehensive book on the subject." Other photography insiders such as Dr. Michael J. Ware and Bill Jay have commended the author as a master-craftsman in platinum-palladium printing. Arentz has mentored other photographers in the platinum-palladium printing process by conducting more than 40 workshops for organizations such as The Center for Creative Photography, The Friends of Photography and The Museum of Photographic Arts. His work was displayed at over fifty one-man exhibits in museums and private galleries in the US and Europe.

== Early life ==
Arentz was born in Detroit, Michigan, to Ewald Arentz and Hermina Theoroda (Auner) Arentz. He grew up in St. Claire Shores, Michigan, and attended Lake Shore High School. He graduated from the University of Michigan in 1959 with a Doctor of Dental Surgery academic degree. He received an MS in oral surgery in 1965.

== Career ==
In 1969, after amateur photography activities, Dick Arentz began three years of study with Phil Davis, author and the inventor of the Beyond the Zone System (BTZS) and the Professor of Art in the School of Art at the University of Michigan. Arentz's interest at that time was in the large format silver contact print. As an informal "thesis," he produced the Death Valley Portfolio in 1972, which was reproduced in a 1973 issue of Camera Magazine.

After a sabbatical in Europe, Arentz relocated to Flagstaff, Arizona, in October 1973 where he taught studio photography and the history of photography at Northern Arizona University (NAU). In 1978, he was named by the Arizona Arts and Humanities Commission as one of "Twenty Arizona Artists" for an exhibition of the same name which opened at the Phoenix Art Museum.

An Edna Rider Whiteman Foundation Grant helped Arentz start a project that year which would culminate in the publication of a book entitled, Four Corners Country published in 1986 and reissued in 1994 as a soft cover.

He returned to University of Michigan-Ann Arbor to study the platinum process with Phil Davis in 1980. Arentz started researching and writing about platinum-palladium techniques when he found that there was little published on the subject. He was especially interested in discovering why there was an unpredictability of results with certain materials.

In 1987, an essay by American photographer, scholar and museum director James Enyeart accompanied Arentz's limited-edition portfolio of 12x20 platinum and palladium prints entitled, The American Southwest.

By 1988, museums and corporations including the Smithsonian American Art Museum; Museum of Modern Art, New York; Museum of Modern Art, San Francisco; the George Eastman House; the Minneapolis Institute of Art and the Center for Creative Photography began collecting his work.

In 1988, Arentz accepted an Isaac W. Bernheim Fellowship to live and work in Kentucky. He began a three-year project photographing the human effect of the landscape in Mid-southern states and Appalachia. An exhibition and catalog entitled Outside the Mainstream was the result of that work. The 1990 project was funded by the National Endowment for the Arts under the sponsorship of The Huntington Museum of Art. The catalog included an introduction by Merry Foresta, the Smithsonian American Art Museum's first Curator of Photography.

During that same year, Arentz was one of four Arizona artists selected for the Phoenix Art Museum Triennial Exhibition. In 1992, he was included in a traveling exhibition Between Home and Heaven, Contemporary American Landscape Photography, curated by the National Museum of American Art. The catalogue, of course, included his images. Arentz exhibited at the Fox-Talbot Museum and A Positive View at the Saatchi Gallery in England through 1994–1995. The following year, he accepted a fellowship from the Columbus Art Museum to create a portfolio of photographs of Central Ohio.

Arentz continued researching and teaching the platinum-palladium process. In the process, he uncovered the solution to a paper problem that had plagued platinum-palladium printers for years. His formulation of specifications allowed a major paper company, Crane & Co., to manufacture a paper suitable for platinum and palladium photographic processes. In 1999, he published the first edition of Platinum & Palladium Printing with Focal Press.

Following research into the specific uses of sodium chloroplatinate (Na2) as a contrast control agent, Platinum & Palladium Printing was revised for a second edition in 2005. That year the Platinum Metals Review journal and the Photographic Society of America (PSA) Journal reviewed the textbook.

== Later career ==
In 2000, Arentz switched to the latest digital technology after spending thirty-five years exposing film through the bellows of large-format view cameras. Arentz moved to a new phase of his career in 2010 with the publication of Italy Through Another Lens.

Although Arentz spends a good portion of each year photographing in Europe, he continues to be recognized back home in the USA. Named by the Phoenix Art Museum and the Center for Creative Photography at the University of Arizona in Tucson as one "of the state’s great image makers," his work was included in their combined 2012 exhibition entitled, Iconic Arizona: Celebrating the Centennial with Photographs from the Center for Creative Photography. In 2013 Arentz received the Phoenix Art Museum INFOCUS Founders Award for contributions to photography. INFOCUS is a photography support organization of Phoenix Art Museum. The next year his photo exhibition was named one of '10 Opening Exhibitions to Watch' by MutualArt. Outdoor Photographer magazine called him the "master of Platinum" and "expert platinum and palladium printer" in a 2016 article. His work was included in the 2017 book, Platinum and Palladium Photographs: Technical History, Connisseurship, and Preservation published by the Photographic Materials Group.

Since 2017, Arentz has concentrated on photographing the interiors of English cathedrals, using a historic Leica lens.

== Works and publications ==
His work is represented in numerous public and private collections, including those of the Columbus Museum of Art, Phoenix Art Museum, and the Museum of Modern Art in New York City.

- The Grand Tour (1st ed.). (1998) Tucson, AZ: Nazraeli Press.
- Outside the Mainstream. (1990) Huntington, WV
- Platinum and Palladium Printing. (2000) Boston; Oxford: Focal Press.
- Platinum and Palladium Printing. (2005) Boston; Oxford: Focal Press.
- The British Isles. (2002) Tucson, AZ: Nazraeli Press.
- Italy Through Another Lens. (2010) Tucson, AZ: Nazraeli Press.

== See also ==
- Platinum print
