= Finlaycolor =

Finlaycolor was an early color photography process.

In Uncle Tungsten, Oliver Sacks reminisces:

The most exciting way of getting instant color was by a process called Finlaycolor, in which, in effect, three color-separation negatives were taken simultaneously by using a grid ruled with microscopic red, green and violet lines. One then made a positive, a lantern slide from this negative, and brought it into exact alignment with the grid. This was tricky, delicate, but when one had them in perfect register, the previously black-and-white slide would burst into full color. Since the screen, with its microscopic lines, simply appeared grey, one saw, when it was juxtaposed with the slide, the most magical, unexpected creation of color, where seemingly there had been none before. (The National Geographic originally used Finlaycolor, and one could see the fine lines on these if one looked with a magnifying glass.)

== See also ==
- Finlay colour process
- History of photography
- List of photographic processes
