= Lumi (company) =

American packaging supply company

Lumi, Inc.
- Founded: 2009; 17 years ago
- Founders: Jesse Genet; Steph Ango
- Fate: Acquired by Narvar
- Headquarters: Los Angeles, California, United States
- Website: www.lumi.com

Lumi, Inc. is a Los Angeles–based company founded by Jesse Genet and Steph Ango that offers packaging and supply chain management software. The company got its start developing Inkodye, a photo-reactive vat dye that develops its color through exposure to UV or sunlight. The company was acquired by Narvar in 2021.

== History ==
Jesse Genet began experimenting with different printing techniques as a teenager in 2004, attempting to print photographs on cotton T-shirts. Unsatisfied with the results of screen printing and dye-sublimation she pursued her research and found what became a precursor to Inkodye, a chemical formula from the 1950s owned by a retired engineer. After meeting Stephan Ango while studying at Art Center College of Design, the pair acquired the chemical formula and began modernizing it.

Lumi launched a Kickstarter campaign in December 2009 to fund R&D of the technology. The company raised $13,597 and rewarded its backers with wallets, bags and other products printed using the process. The project was an early success for the Kickstarter platform and went on to win Kickstarter's Best Design Project of 2010. In June 2012, Lumi launched a second Kickstarter campaign with an initial fundraising target of $50,000 to commercialize its printing process, Inkodye. The project was successfully funded, reaching over 500% of the initial target and raising a total of $268,437. Rewards included Inkodye printing kits allowing users to create personalized photographic prints on cotton and other natural materials. In February 2015, Lumi appeared on ABC's Shark Tank and received 2 offers, but Genet did not accept either of the offers.

In March 2015, Lumi announced its new software platform, Lumi.com, for designing and ordering custom-made packaging. The service was funded by seed capital firm Y Combinator. Lumi's platform was inspired by the challenges the company had faced in producing packaging for Inkodye. The platform was compared to other services such as Blackbox by Cards Against Humanity and Make That Thing! by TopatoCo, provided by companies that also found success via Kickstarter and looked to simplify fulfillment and manufacturing for others.

In 2021, Lumi was acquired by Narvar.

== Inkodye process ==
The process of printing with Inkodye resembles that of other alternative photographic processes though its chemistry is related to vat dyes such as indigo rather than iron or silver-based chemicals used in cyanotype or Van dyke brown which have higher toxicity. Inkodye is available in several colors (red, orange, copper, blue, navy, magenta, plum, sepia and black) which can be mixed together and diluted with water.

A monochromatic digital negative is first printed on transparency film generally using an inkjet printer with black ink only. The negative is made to be the same size as the final print. Inkodye is then applied to the desired T-shirt or fabric in its undeveloped state. The negative is placed on top of the sensitized fabric and exposed to sunlight or UV light. Exposure times vary from 3 to 15 minutes depending on the desired color and intensity of light. The exposure to sunlight develops the dye's color and binds it to the fabric. The final step is to wash out the unexposed dye using a washing machine and laundry detergent.
