= Robert Vano =

Slovak photographer living in Prague (born 1948)

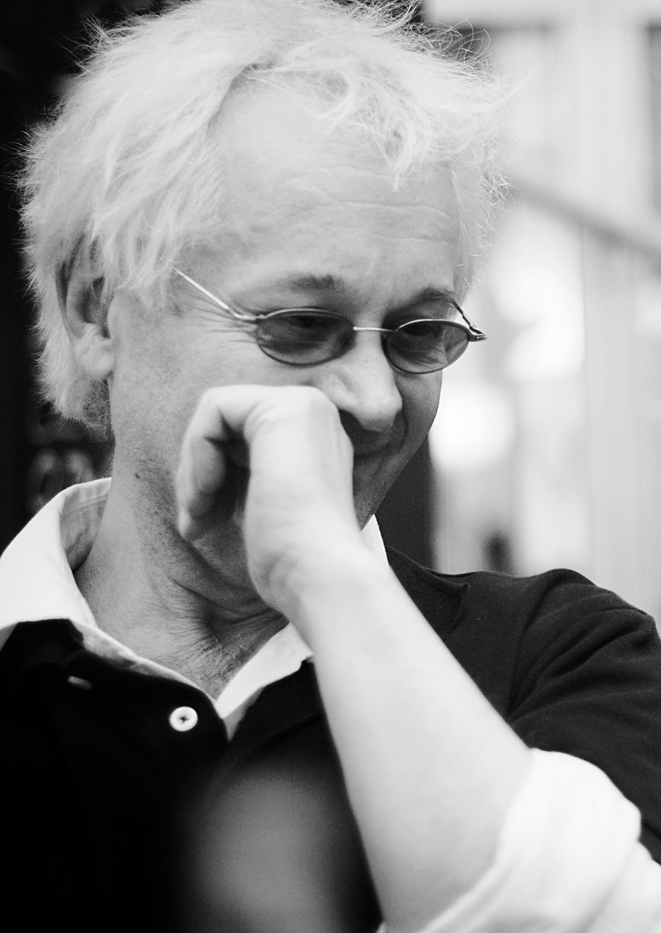
Robert Vano, 2010

Robert Vano (born Róbert Vaňo; May 5, 1948) is a Slovak photographer living in Prague.

== Life and work ==
Vano was born in Nové Zámky, Czechoslovakia, to parents of Hungarian descent. After his exams in 1967, instead of joining the armed forces for duty, he emigrated via Yugoslavia and Italy to the United States where he made a living as a hairdresser and makeup artist. Later on, he worked as an assistant for photographers (Horst P. Horst, Marco Glaviano or Leo Castelli).

Since 1984 he has worked as an independent photographer. He worked in New York City, Paris, Milan and Prague, where he photographed for fashion magazines such as Cosmopolitan, Harper's Bazaar and Vogue.

Since 1995 he lives in Prague, where in 1996 to 2003 he worked as artistic director of the Czech edition of the Elle magazine, and then in 2009 to 2014 as creative director at Czechoslovak Models. Since then he has worked as a freelance photographer.

Vano is primarily a fashion and commercial photographer. He makes black and white portraits and male nudes on film and also a now little-used technique of platinotype. He prefers photographing in daylight.

In 2010 he was awarded the European Trebbia award for creative activities.

Vano's largest exhibition called The Platinum Collection, referencing his signature technique, took place in Prague's Mánes venue in 2009.

== Publications ==
- Love You from Prague. Praha : Radost, 1991. ISBN 80-85189-09-7.
- Boys and roses. Praha : Scarabeus, 1992. ISBN 9788085901139.
- Někdy ráj. Praha : XYZ, 2008. With David Hrbek. ISBN 978-80-87021-45-3.
- Platinová kolekce. České Budějovice : Karmášek, 2009. ISBN 9788087101131.
- Kuchařka pro kluky. Brno: Computer Press, 2010. ISBN 978-80251-3131-2.
- Robert Vano. Praha: Artfoto 2010. ISBN 978-80-86085-93-7.
- Fotka nemusí být ostrá. Praha : Slovart, 2015. ISBN 978-80-7529-107-3.
- Memories. Praha: Slovart, 2016. ISBN 978-80-7529-265-0
