= W. W. J. Nicol =

Scottish chemist, photographer (1855–1929)

William Walker James Nicol, FRSE (1855 – 18 March 1929) commonly known as W. W. J. Nicol, was a Scottish chemist and photographer who invented the Kallitype printing process in 1889.

== Life ==
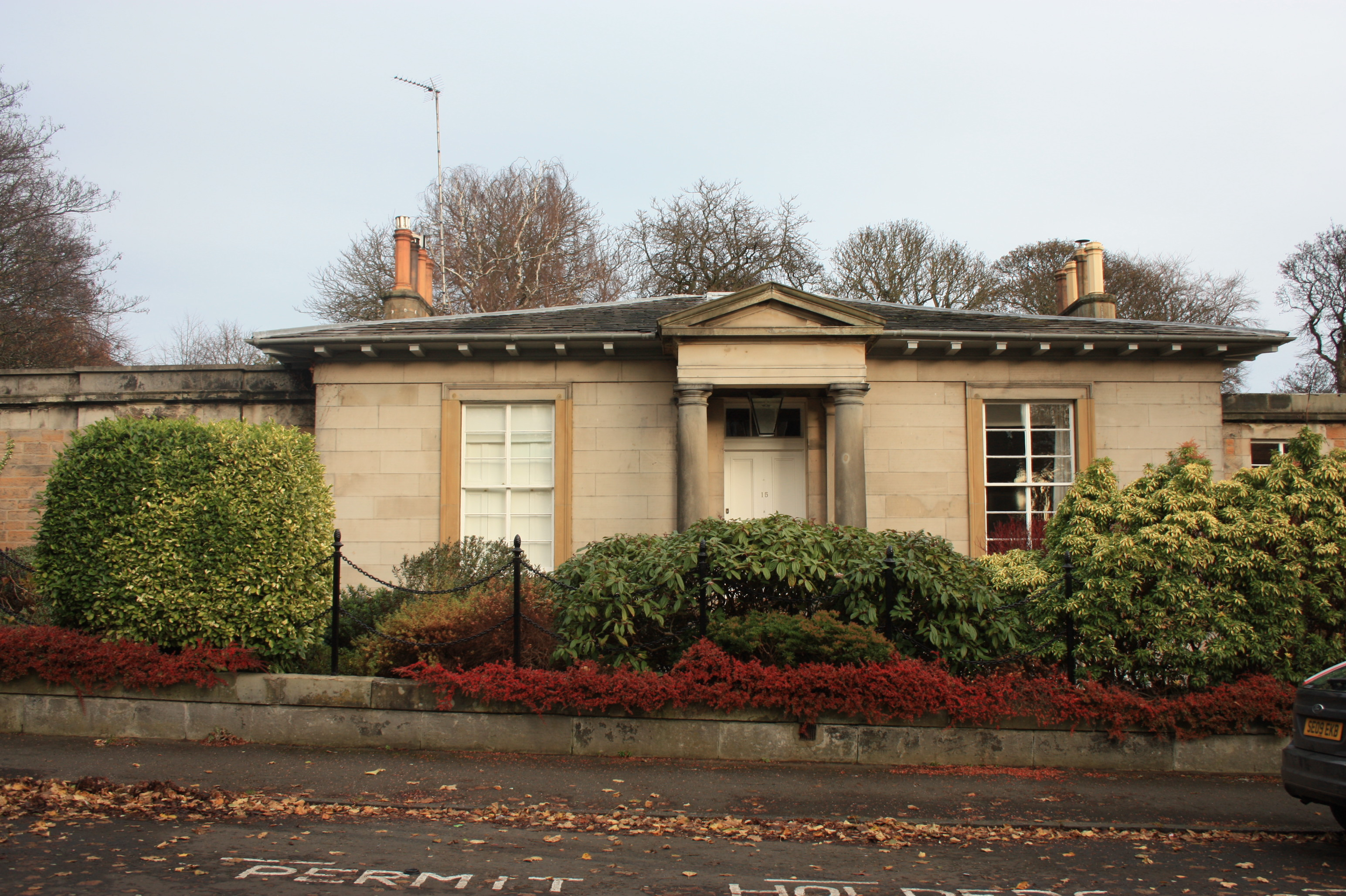
Nicol's home at 15 Blacket Place in Edinburgh

William Walker James Nicol was born in Edinburgh in 1855, the only son of Marianne Ballantyne and her husband, William Walker Nicol, both from the Scottish Borders. He was educated first in England then returned to Edinburgh to be educated at Edinburgh Academy alongside Robert Haldane. He entered the University of Edinburgh in 1872 studying sciences and specialised in chemistry graduating with a BSc. In 1875 he became a Demonstrator assisting the Professor.

In 1876 he began lecturing in chemistry at University College in Bristol. In 1880 he moved to Mason College, Birmingham where he remained until 1894. In 1882 he campaigned unsuccessfully for the Chair in Chemistry at the University of Durham.

In 1880 he was elected a Fellow of the Royal Society of Edinburgh. His proposers were Sir Peter Guthrie Tait, Alexander Crum Brown, Matthew Forster Heddle and Sir Peter Redford Scott Lang.

He returned to Edinburgh around 1895 and lived at 15 Blacket Place, a neo-classical bungalow, in the south of the city.

Nicol died on 18 March 1929, in Edinburgh.

== Publications ==
- On the Condition of Ammonium Salts when Dissolved in Water (1882)
- The Nature of Solution (1883)
