= Digital negative (transparency) =

Photography method to create negatives

The digital negative is the collective name for methods used by photographers to create negatives on transparency film for the contact printing of alternative photographic techniques. The negatives can also be enlarged using traditional gelatin silver processes, though this is usually reserved for negatives of 4x5" or larger due to quality limitations imposed by printer technology. This set of techniques is separate from the Digital negative (DNG) file format, although this format may be used to create digital negative transparencies.

== Uses ==
Digital negatives are typically used with one of the alternative processes such as gum bichromate, cyanotype, or Inkodye. In these cases, digital negatives are most commonly printed full size to create contact prints. The negative is sandwiched printer ink-to-emulsion in a contact printing frame and exposed under a UV light source. They can also be used to create positives (where the initial digital file is not inverted) to make positives on emulsions such as collodion processes.

They can also be used to create gelatin silver-based prints from digital files. However, since printers cannot spray small enough drops of ink to ensure detail in the smaller traditional sizes such as 35 mm, a larger format such as 4x5" is normally used.

== Advantages and disadvantages ==
Digital negatives offer many advantages, such as the ability to shoot with a digital camera and edit digitally while still working with alternative or traditional photographic processes. Small, analog negatives can be scanned and enlarged digitally to create new negatives instead of using the traditional enlarging film that must be processed in a darkroom. Another advantage lies in their reproducibility: a damaged negative can be recreated from the original digital file.

Generally, digital negatives are made using an inkjet printer using black ink only, adjusted to the proper density to suit the process. This can be achieved simply with curves or other adjustments in an image editing program or using special printer drivers or raster image processors.

It is also possible to use different colors in selected areas of an image to create contrast differences selectively when printing a negative, similar to using colored filters on black and white film. An example of this technique would be using a red filter only on the sky, and a green filter on just the grass, all at once red filter would darken the sky and the green filter would lighten the grass).

Disadvantages to using digital negatives are driven mainly by printer limitations. Very small negatives tend to be blurry and grainy due to large ink droplets. Also, some inks can create banding not evident in the negative but obvious in the final print. Epson K3 Ultrachrome inks have shown to work very well in the creation of digital negatives.

Some types of transparency film work better than others: it is important to ensure that the film does not have any agents in it that block UV since this will allow only a very small amount of necessary UV to expose the print. Some films do not respond well to inks and even after drying, will smudge and smear.

== Creation of digital negatives ==
For optimum results, digital negatives must be matched in terms of density and contrast to the process to which they will be applied. Since contemporary inks and printers cannot offer a density range as wide as traditional silver negatives, each printing process is usually associated with a separate tonal curve, so that the photographer can take full advantage of its gamut. Also, different processes react to colors differently; sometimes photographers print out a monochromatic negative in a specific color to get a specific contrast range. For example, some use purple inks and low contrast curves for the small gamut of cyanotype printing, while the platinum/palladium process necessitates a high contrast curve that works best with green ink.

Photographers have a number of options in creating digital negatives. Usually, the process involves a lot of testing and reprinting. Chemical procedures must be standardized to allow for repeatable results. First, a tonal scale is printed out on the transparency film and this is used to create a print using whatever process is being tested. Next, the print is scanned and the resulting tones are examined either visually or using a specialized computer program, and a new contrast curve is generated to compensate for any perceived inadequacies. The photographer may also decide here to use a different ink color. The new negative is printed and again is tested. This process may be repeated until desired results are achieved. Often, the goal is to produce negatives that result in prints with clear shadows and highlights, and a smooth tonal transition between them.
