= Kallitype =

Kallitype is a process for making photographic prints. Patented in 1889 by W. W. J. Nicol (1855–1929), the kallitype print is an iron-silver process, chemically similar to the Van Dyke brown print, that uses a light-sensitive combination of ferric and silver salts. Its theory goes back to John Herschel's work published in 1842. While Van Dyke brown and argyrotype use ferric ammonium citrate, the light-sensitive element used for the kallitype is ferric oxalate. The use of ferric oxalate allows for both extended shadow definition (higher DMAX) and contrast control.

Many developing solutions can be used to give different image colors, such as black, brown, sepia, purple and maroon. Kallitype images generally have a richer tonal range than the cyanotype. These prints were popular in the 19th century, and then their popularity faded away. Sometimes known as "the poor man's platinum print", a kallitype toned in platinum or palladium is virtually identical in tonal range and color to a true platinotype, at much lower cost. It is believed that many kallitypes were passed off as true platinotypes and remain in collections as such. Kallitypes have had a reputation over the years as having poor archival qualities and often fading. Their permanence depends largely on the complete removal of the iron salts during clearing; iron left in the paper after poor clearing shows as a yellow stain, especially in the highlights. Toning with a metal such as gold, platinum, or palladium, which replaces the silver of the image, gives extra image permanence.

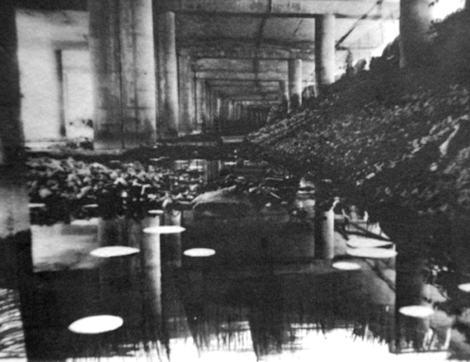
A kallitype test print toned in platinum by Zev Schmitz

== Process ==
Like the platinotype and cyanotype, the kallitype is a contact printing process and the printer must have a negative of equal size to print from. Modern kallitypes are generally made from either a large format camera negative, an enlarged internegative from a traditional wet darkroom, or a digital negative. Cotton rag paper is generally recommended for printing kallitypes, although multiple paper types will lead to satisfactory results. Gloves should be worn during coating and when handling sensitizer as the sensitizer chemicals can be quite toxic. While the Van Dyke Brown and Argyrotype are both "printing out" processes (with the complete image being formed during exposure), the kallitype is a "develop out" process that requires the print to be submerged in a developer solution to make the image visible after exposure. Like the platinotype, the image will appear instantly when the paper is submerged in the developer.

The final tone of the print is controlled both via the developer choice and through the use of toning solutions such as gold and platinum toners.

Kallitype employs ferric oxalate as the light-sensitive element in its sensitizer; in modern practice a 20 percent ferric oxalate solution is mixed in equal parts with a 10 percent silver nitrate solution. As ferric oxalate is not a widely used industrial chemical, it is usually prepared specifically for kallitype and other alternative printing processes.
