= Doerner Institute =

Art school in Munich, Germany

The Doerner Institute was founded in 1937 in Munich as a State Testing and Research Institute for Colour Technology (in German Staatliche Prüf- und Forschungsanstalt für Farbentechnik).

== The founding of the Institute ==
The Doerner Institute is named after Max Doerner, an artist and Munich Art Academy professor. His book, The Materials of the Artist and their Use in Painting, published in 1921 established Doerner's reputation and his argument which is quoted in Phillip Ball's "Bright Earth" provided the inspiration for the institute. That argument was that the artist cannot be expected to be chemist; he would only become victim of a dilettantism more harmful than beneficial....[Yet] the laws which govern the materials of the artist are the same for all artists, to whatever school they belong. Whoever wishes to employ his materials correctly and to the best advantage must know these laws and follow them, otherwise sooner or later he will pay dearly for his mistakes.... Craftsmanship must again be made the solid foundation of art.

== Current Activities ==
Since 1977, the Doerner Institute has been home to the conservation department of the Bayerische Staatsgemäldesammlungen as well as its "own" science department. Other activities at the institute include:

- research into historical painting techniques and materials
- development of scientific methods applied to objects of art
- museum design or the renovation of historic buildings used as museums.
