= Monochrome printmaking =

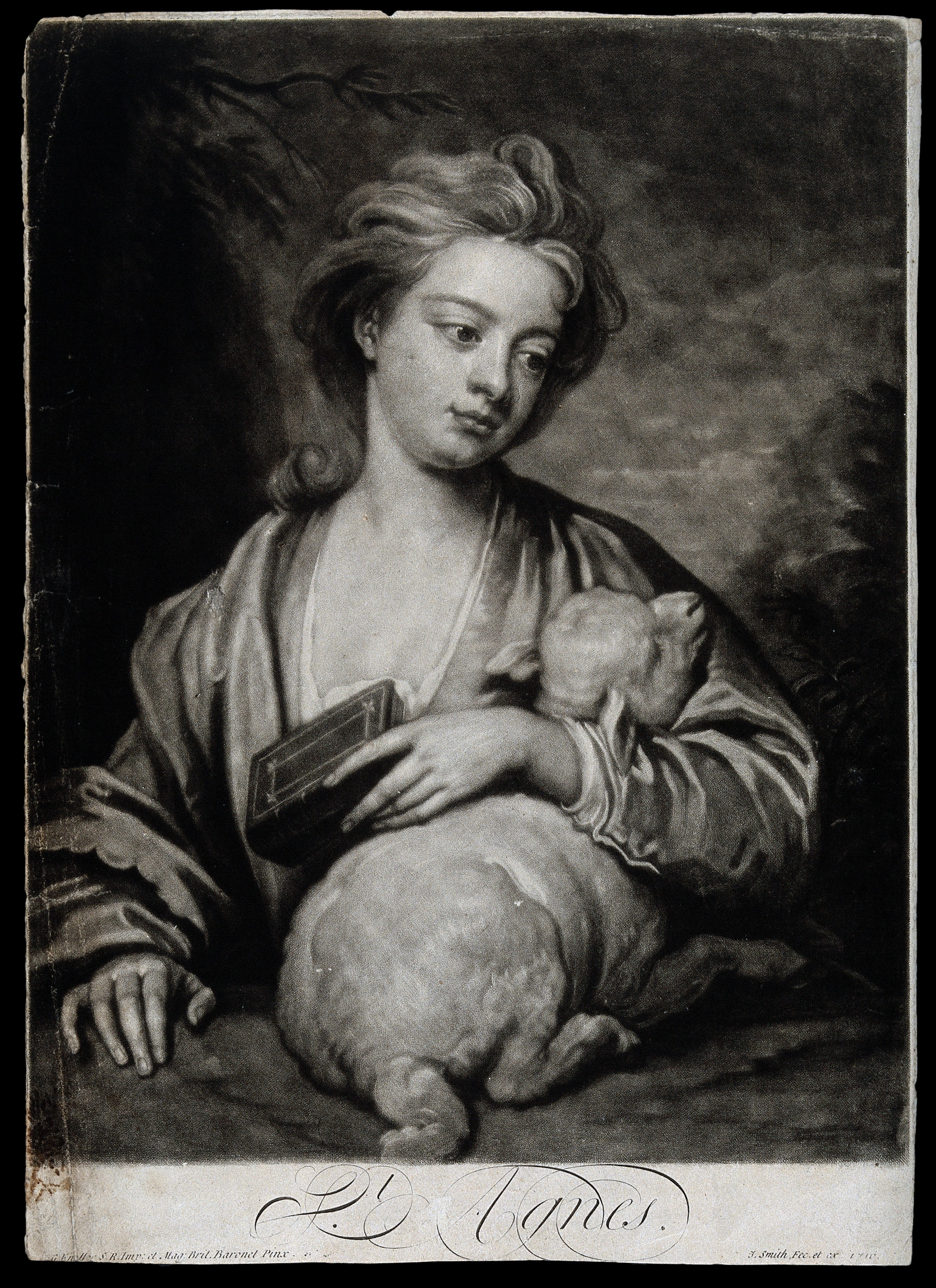
Saint Agnes, mezzotint by John Smith after Godfrey Kneller.

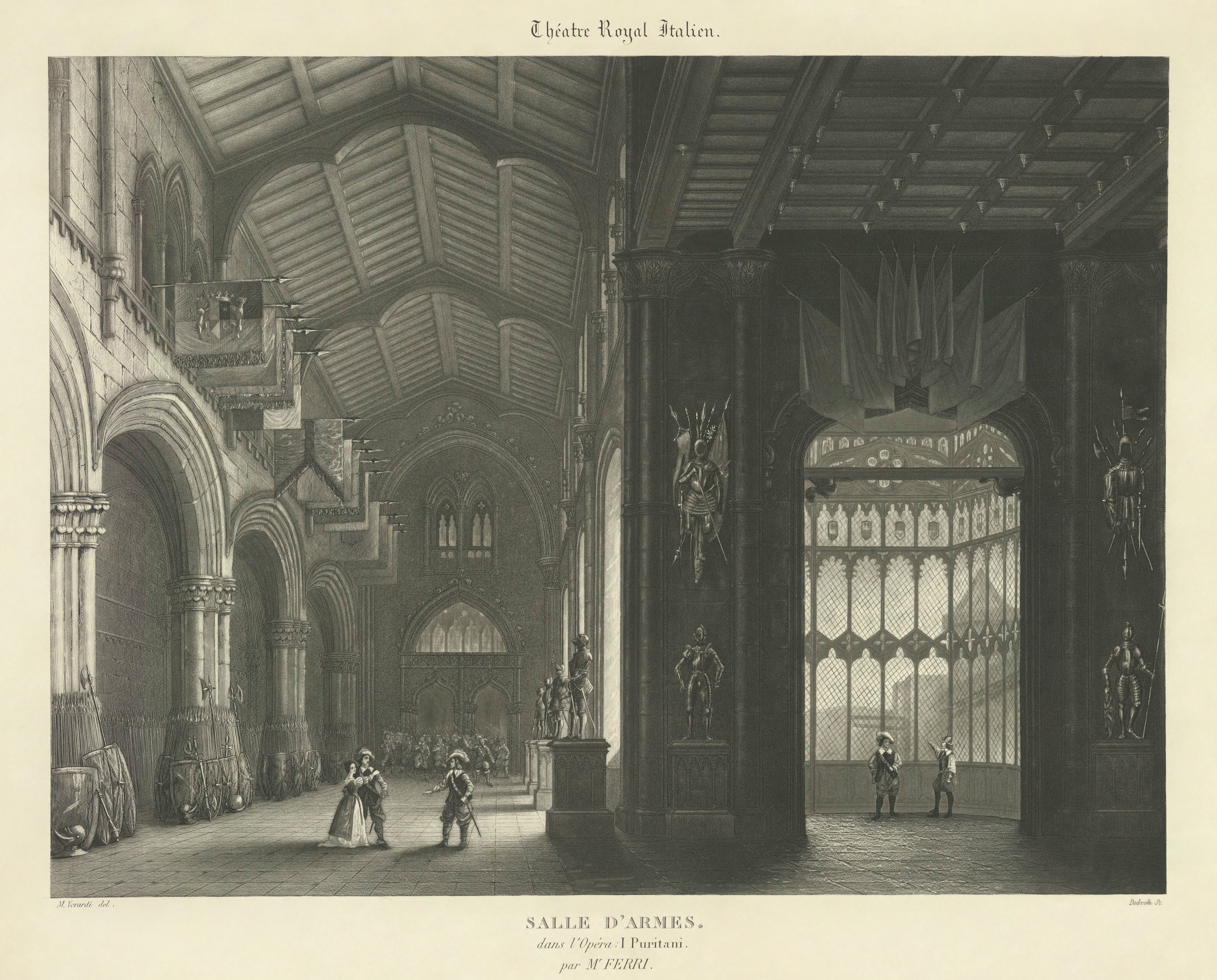
1835 aquatint showing the first production of I puritani.

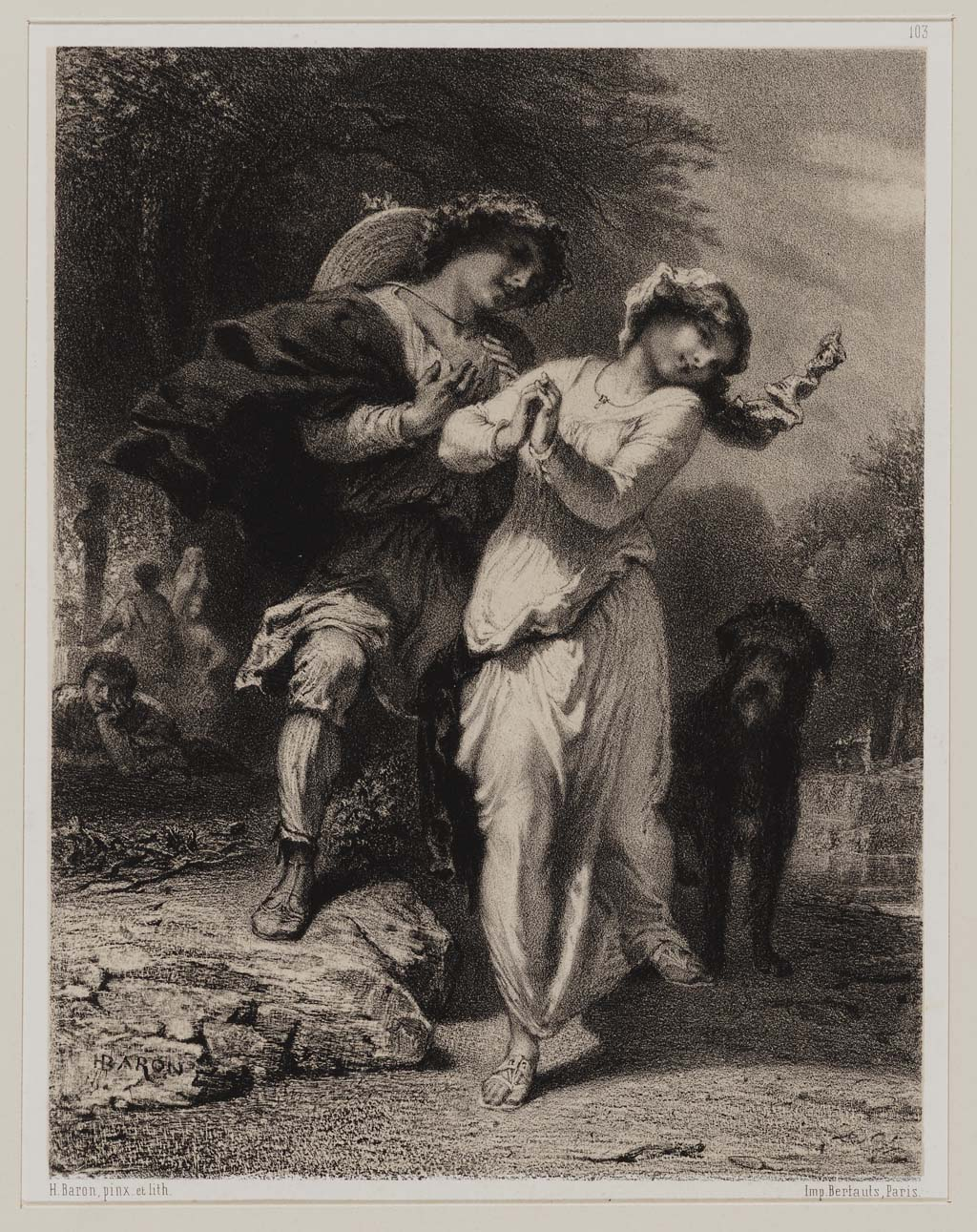
Coquetry, lithograph by Henri Baron (1816-1885).

Monochrome printmaking is a generic term for any printmaking technique that produces only shades of a single color. While the term may include ordinary printing with only two colors — "ink" and "no ink" — it usually implies the ability to produce several intermediate colors between those two extremes.

In contrast with color printing, monochrome printing needs only a single ink and may require only a single pass of the paper through the printing press.

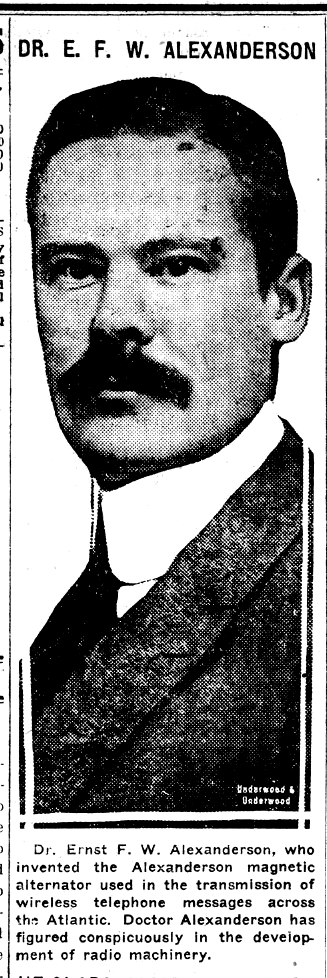
Halftone newspaper photo of Ernst Alexanderson. The Cordova Daily Times, Cordova, 1920-01-17.

== Techniques ==
Monochrome printmaking techniques include:

- Mezzotint
- Aquatint
- Lithography
- Halftoning

== See also ==
- Monochrome painting
- Monochrome photography
- Monochromatic image
