= Van Dyke brown (printing) =

Printing process named after Anthony van Dyck

Van Dyke brown is an iron-silver photographic printing process. It is named for the resemblance of the color of its prints to Van Dyke brown, a brown oil paint named after the Flemish painter Anthony van Dyck.

Paper is coated with a sensitizer mixed from solutions of ferric ammonium citrate, tartaric acid and silver nitrate, dried, and exposed to ultraviolet light or sunlight in contact with a negative. No developer is needed: the print is washed in water, fixed briefly in a dilute sodium thiosulfate (hypo) solution and washed again, and the final wash is important for the stability of the print. Unlike many other photographic printing methods, the process does not require a darkroom.

The process is based on the argentotype, the first iron-silver process, which John Herschel described in 1842. The Van Dyke brown process was patented in Germany in 1895 by Arndt and Troost. It was originally called many different names, such as sepia print or brown print. It has even been called kallitype, however that process uses ferric oxalate instead of ferric ammonium citrate. The Van Dyke process can be regarded as a simplified kallitype that needs no ferric oxalate and is processed in plain water, but it offers less control over contrast.

Concerns have been voiced about the archival qualities of the Van Dyke brown print, which had a poor reputation for permanence from the beginning because many early prints did not last long. These problems are attributed to inadequate processing rather than to the process itself, and properly processed Van Dyke brown prints should last as long as prints made by any other silver process.

== Gallery ==
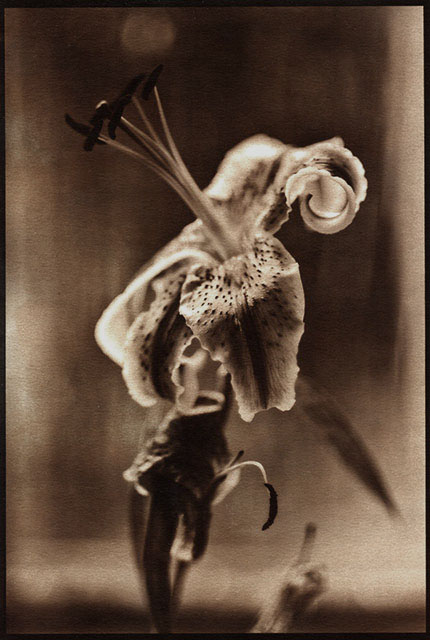
Van Dyke brown example

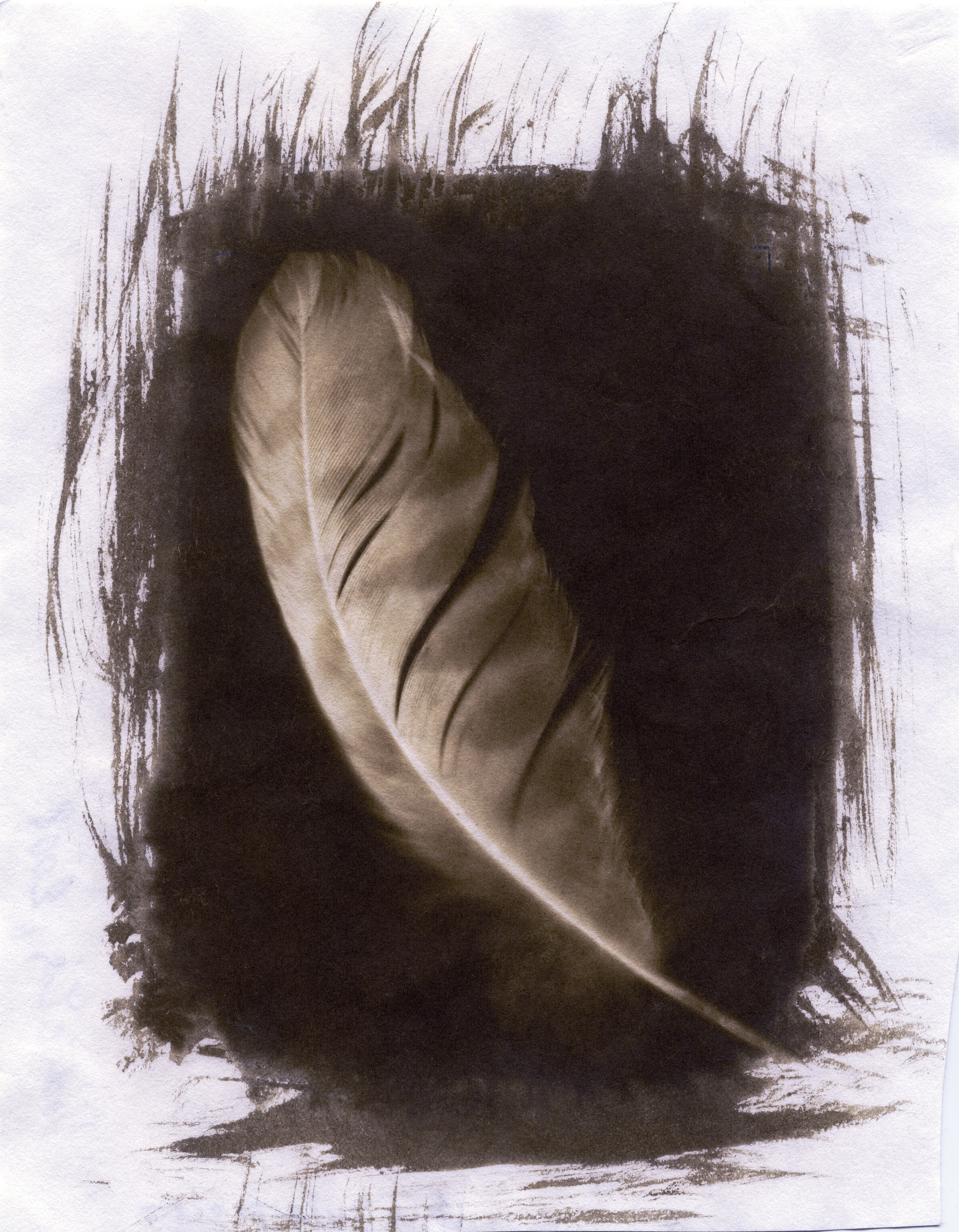
Brown print photogram

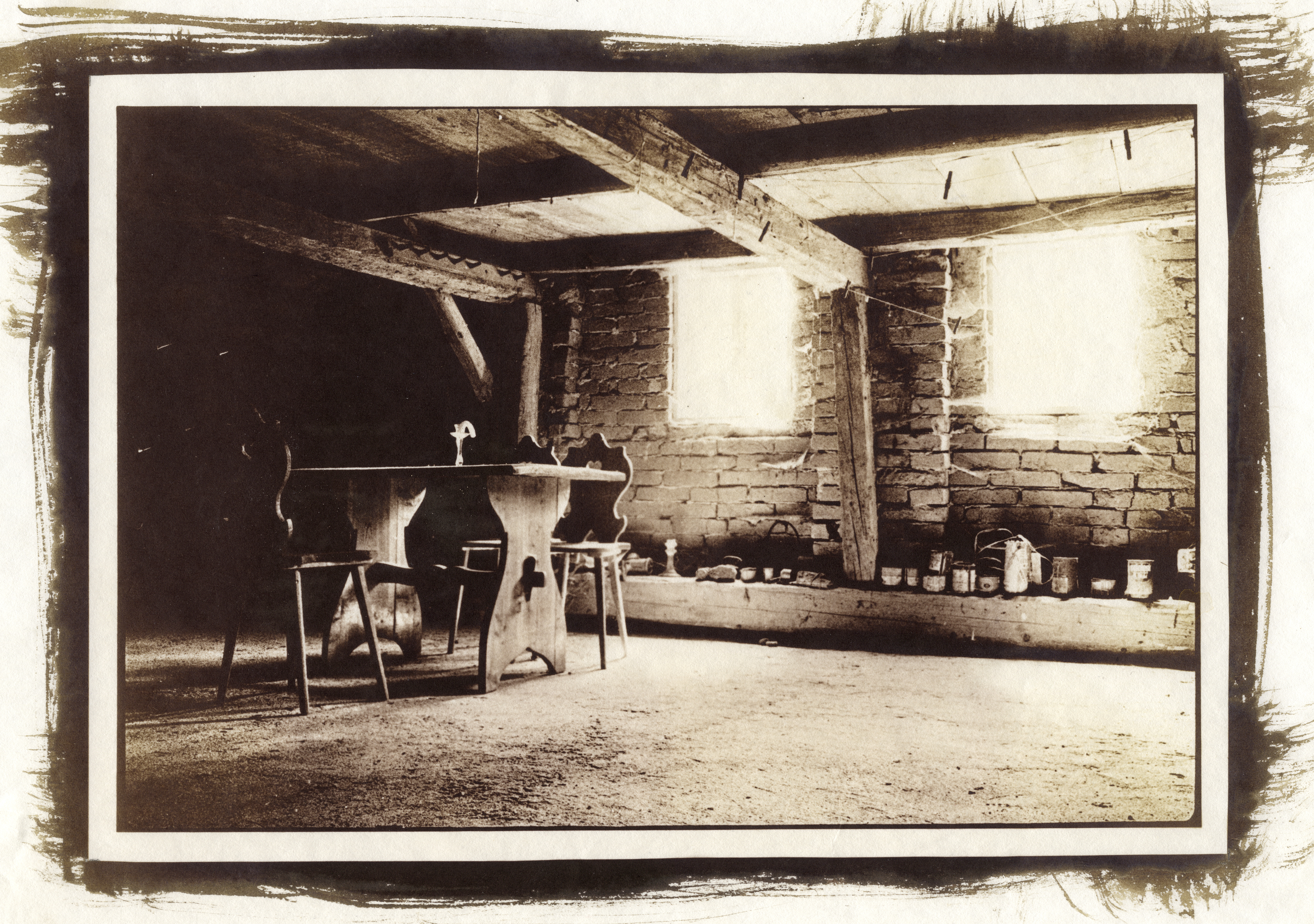
Van Dyke copy of negative printed on transparent foil
