= Anthotype =

Image created using photosensitive material from plants

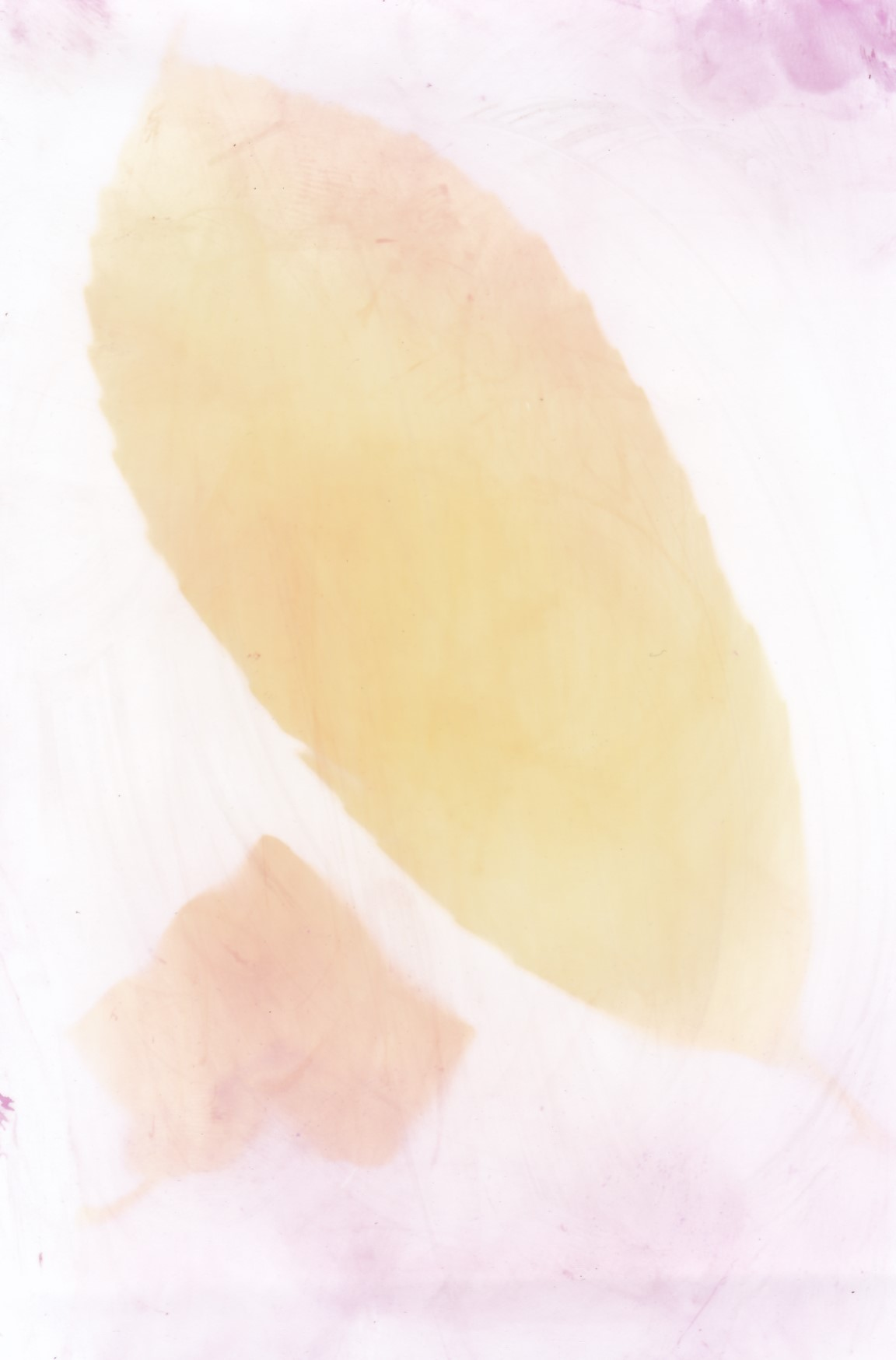
Rhododendron leaf and ivy leaf on photo paper for printers, sensitized with beetroot juice 10x15 cm; 4 x 6 inches

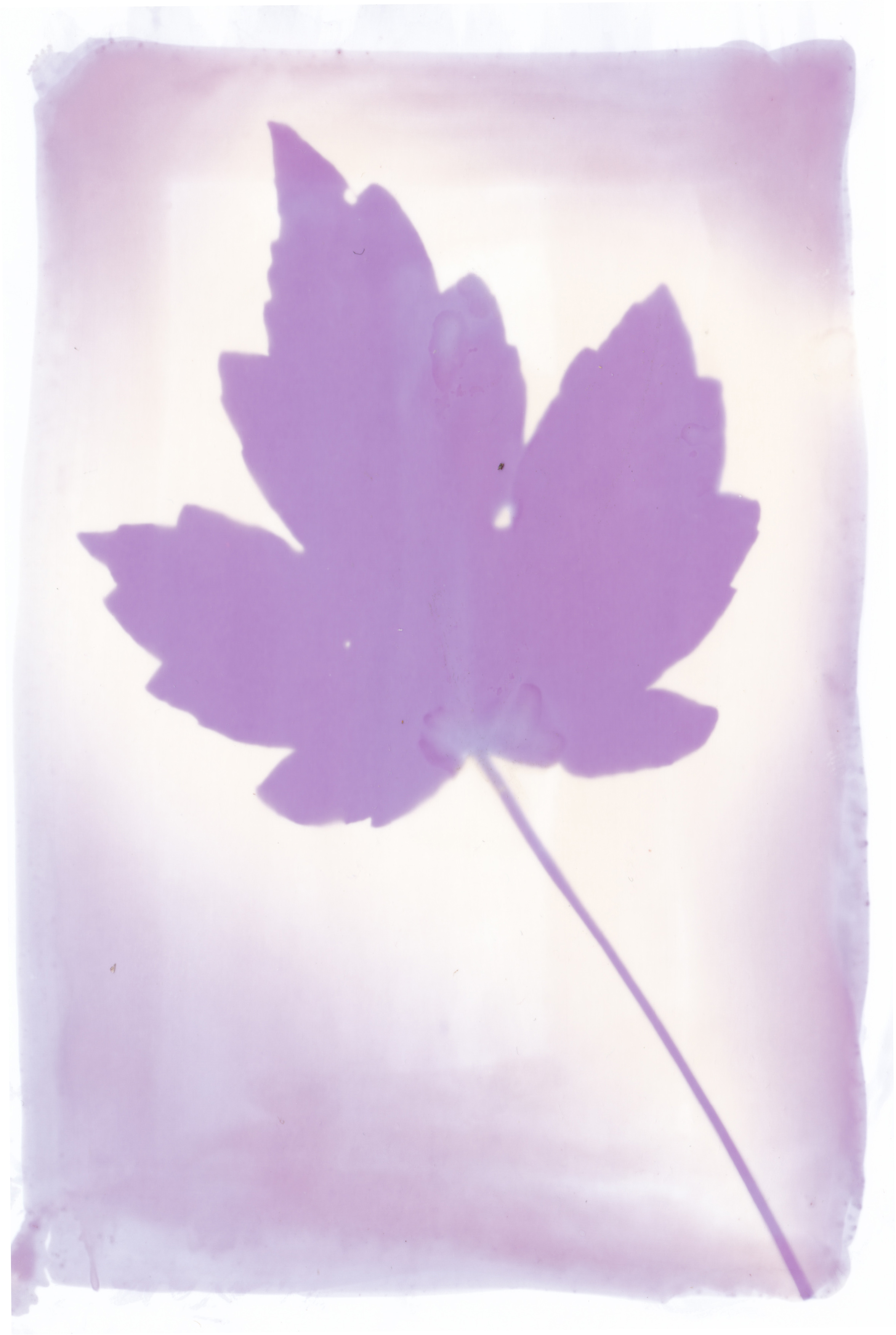
Maple leaf, anthotype with sour cherry juice, 2 h exposure time at high noon in summer time

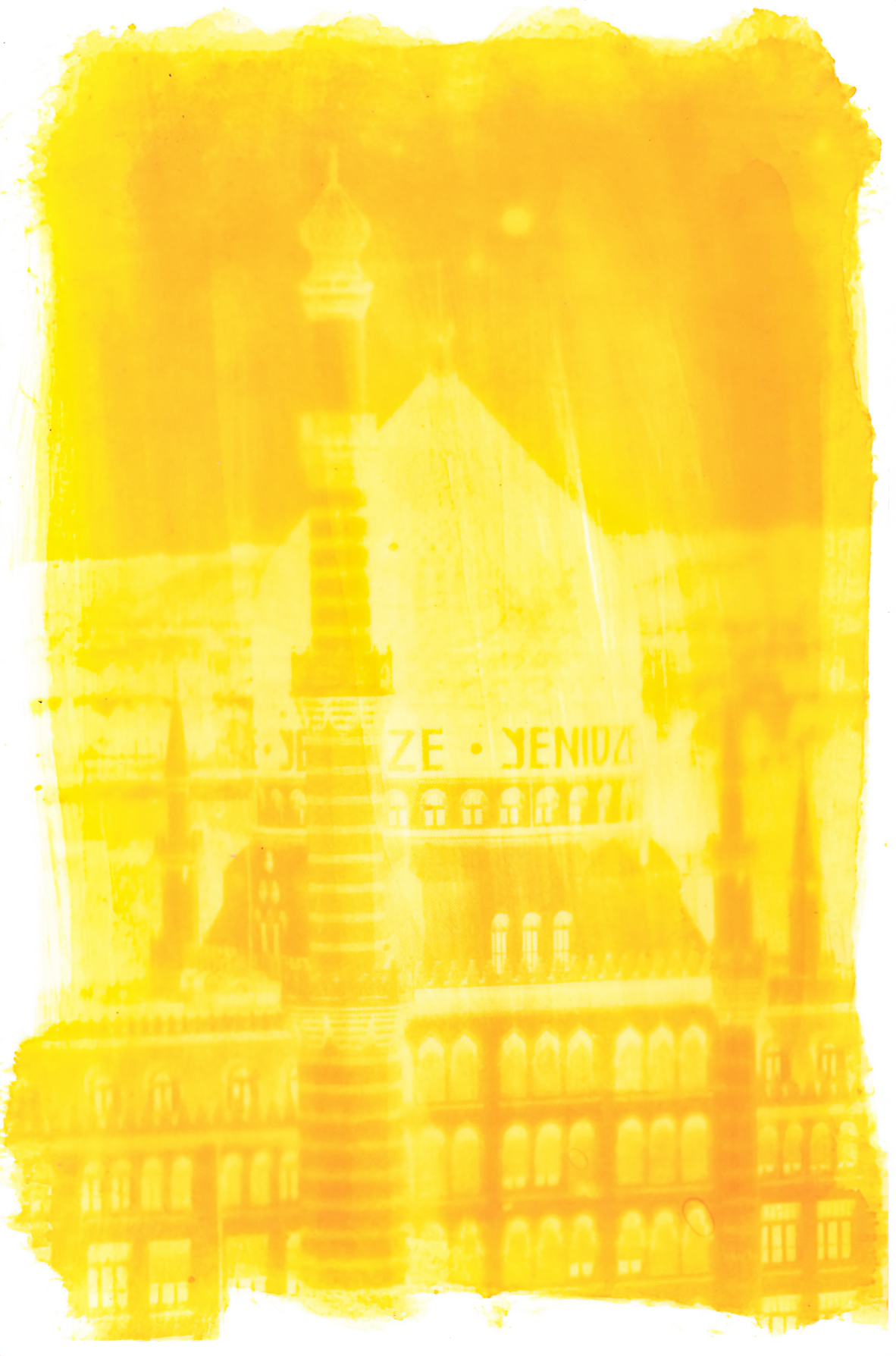
Yenidze, Dresden, transparent photo placed at the paper with turmeric, 4h exposure, anthotype with alcoholic solution of turmericin isopropanol

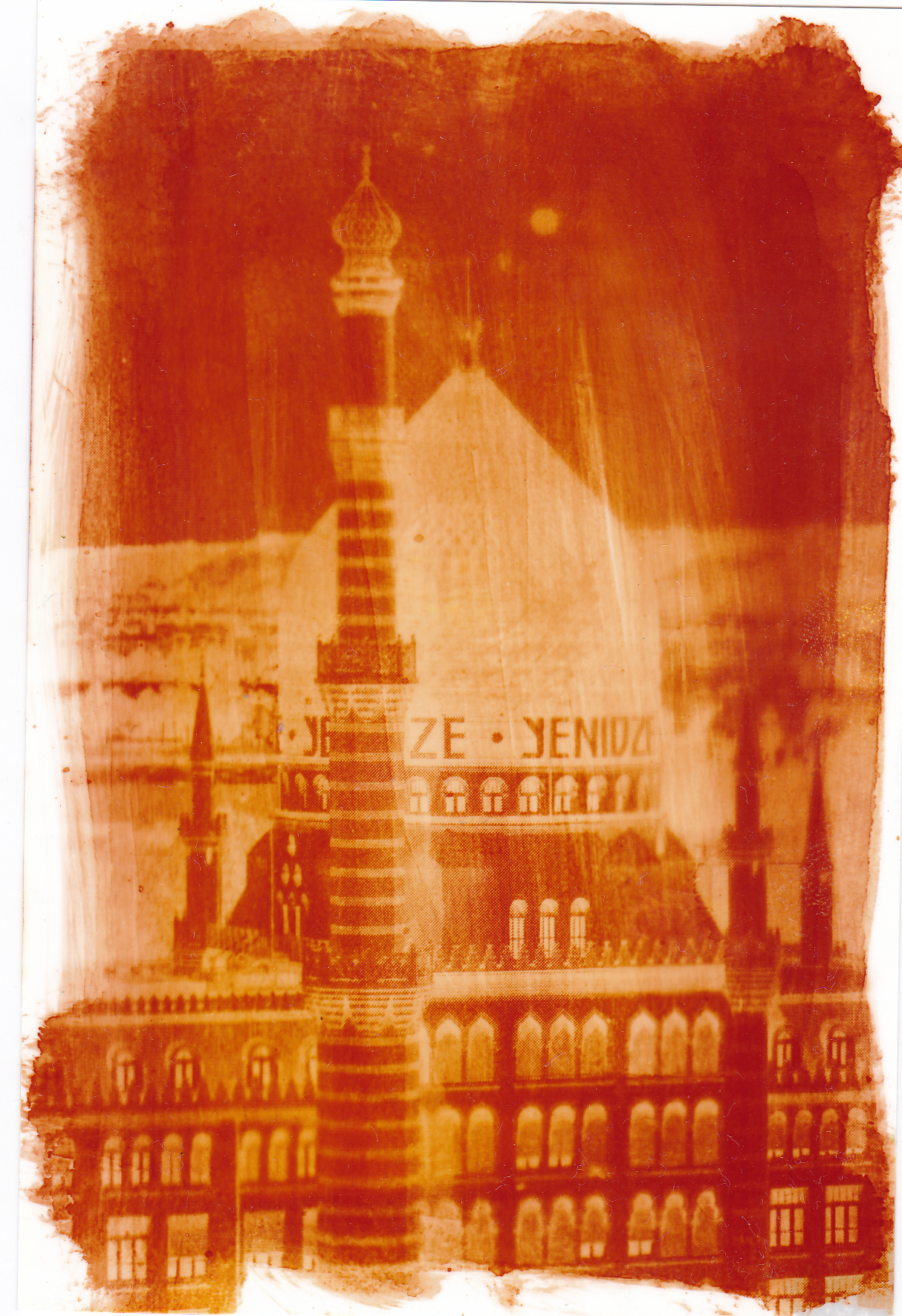
Yenidze, Dresden, the same anthotype with alcoholic solution of turmeric in isopropanol and later development with baking soda

An anthotype (from Greek άνθος anthos "flower" and τύπος týpos "imprint") is an image created using photosensitive material from plants under the influence of light (e.g. UV light, rays of sun). The anthotype is distinct from nature printing, the art of printing from pressed and inked specimens.

An emulsion is made from crushed flower petals or any other light-sensitive plant, fruit or vegetable.

A sheet of paper is covered with the emulsion, and then it is dried.

Some leaves, a transparent photo positive or other material is placed on the paper; and then it is exposed to direct full sunlight until the image part not covered by the material is bleached out by the sun rays.

The original color remains in the shadowed parts depending on the exposure. The image cannot be fixed, so the paper remains sensitive to light.

Note: The color of anthocyanidins, anthocyans, carotinoids, and other light sensitive plant material may depend on the pH of the water and of the paper.

== History ==
The photo-sensitive properties of plants and vegetables have been known to scholars for centuries. Among many early observations the experiments of Henri August Vogel in Paris are of particular interest. In 1816 he discovered that an alcoholic tincture of either red carnations, violets or corn poppy turned white behind blue glass in a few days, while it remained unchanged behind red glass after about the same time. Cotton and paper colored with these tinctures exhibited the same differences.

The anthotype process was discovered in 1839 by Sir John Herschel. Herschel referenced an experiment on October 11, 1839 in a paper published in 1840 at the Philosophical Transactions of the Royal Society of London. Herschel gave the anthotype process a proper introduction in his 1842 paper to the same institution. Mary Somerville built on Herschel's research and documented it in a letter to him dated 1845. Sir John Herschel presented her findings to the Royal Society, giving her full credit in his 1845 paper.

Herschel's research into making photographic images from flowers was limited and was ultimately abandoned since no commercial application was feasible from a process which takes days to produce an image.

The process continued to be listed in photographic literature of the time but was likely little used.

Over time the process earned a reputation for being too impractical. Image permanence has been brought into question, but this problem seems to be mostly related to choice of flower or plant matter.

== How it works ==
From an examination of the researches of Sir John Herschel on the coloring matter of plants, it will be seen that the action of the sun's rays is to destroy the color, effecting a sort of chromatic analysis, in which two distinct elements of color are separated, by destroying the one and leaving the other. The action is confined within the visible spectrum, and thus a broad distinction is exhibited between the action of the sun's rays on vegetable juices and on argentine compounds, the latter being most sensibly affected by the invisible rays beyond the violet. It may also be observed, that the rays effective in destroying a given tint, are in a great many cases, those whose union produces a color complementary to the tint destroyed, or, at least, one belonging to that class of colors to which such complementary tint may be preferred. For instance, yellows tending towards orange are destroyed with more energy by the blue rays; blues by the red, orange and yellow rays; purples and pinks by yellow and green rays.

— Henry H. Snelling

== Other flower suggestions ==
Henry H. Snelling writes based on his research: "Viola odorata--or sweet scented violet, yields to alcohol a rich blue color, which it imparts in high perfection to paper. Senecio Splendens -- or double purple groundsel, yields a beautiful color to paper."

Bingham, quoting by Sir John Herschel, recommends Corchorus japonicus flower (japanese Jute) for a "fine yellow colour" that "upon exposure to sunlight, it is in about half an hour rendered quite white".

== World Anthotype Day ==
World Anthotype Day is celebrated on the last Saturday of October. Since 2022, it has brought together global community of artists to share prints and celebrate the anthotype process.

== Literature ==
- Fabbri, M. Anthotypes: Explore the darkroom in your garden and make photographs using plants, ISBN 978-1466261006, 2012.
