= Mordançage =

Chemical photographic technique

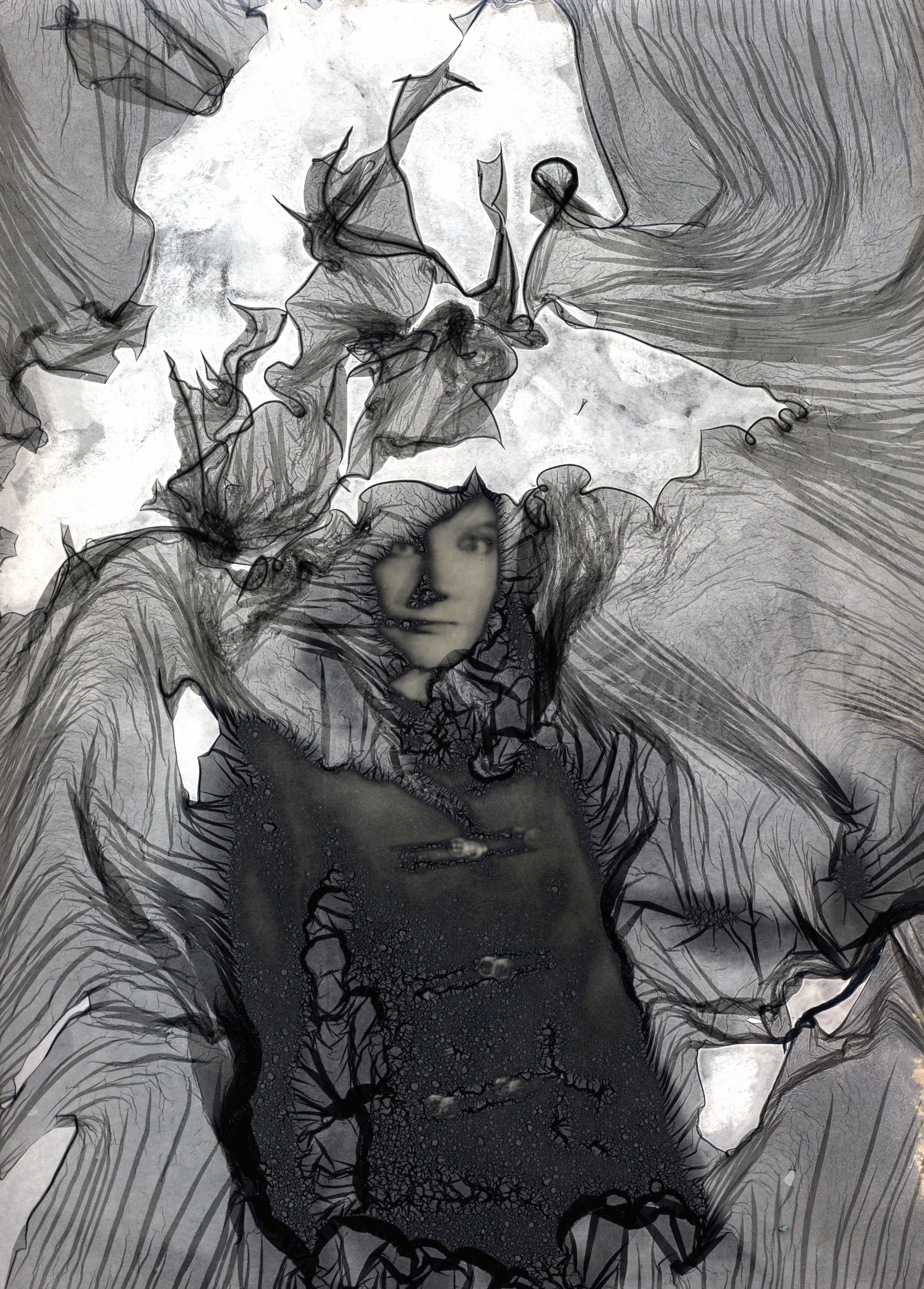
A self-portrait with mordançage applied

Mordançage (French pronunciation: [mɔʁdɑ̃saʒ]) is an alternative photographic process that alters silver gelatin prints to give them a degraded effect. The mordançage solution works in two ways: it chemically bleaches the print so that it can be redeveloped, and it lifts the black areas of the emulsion away from the paper, giving the appearance of veils. Once the emulsion is lifted, it can then be removed or manipulated depending on the desired outcome. Areas where the emulsion was removed appear to be in relief. These prints can become oxidized during their creation, further altering the tonality of the image.

== History ==
Mordançage (pronounced mor-dahn-sahzh) was created by Jean-Pierre Sudre during the 1960s, and he dubbed it with the French term used in the fabric-dying industry for the ancient process of fixing dyes—'mordanting' in English—derived from the Latin mordere, "to bite". The copper chloride component of Mordançage was used in the dyeing industry for fixing colours, and in photography also as a fixer, and for 'thinning down' dense negatives, with 'Spiller's Reducer' devised by John Spiller in the 1860s.

While Sudre is credited with the creation of Mordançage, it relates to late 19th-century photographic processes enabling the entire removal and transfer of emulsion to another surface, such as John Burgess's collodion transfer 'Eburneum' or 'Ivorytype' of 1865, Adolphe Fargier's carbon transfer or the similar and later Autotype, Kodak's Transferotype (1888), or more specifically to a process known as etch-bleach, also referred to as bleach-etch, gelatin relief, or reverse relief.

Etch-bleach was first documented in 1897 by Paul Liesegang and was originally used as a reversal process for film negatives. Within a year, Momme Andresen suggested using hydrogen peroxide and hydrochloric acid in the process in the place of ammonium persulfate. Later references to the etch-bleach process indicate chemistry that is very close to that of mordançage - the only difference being the use of citric acid in place of glacial acetic acid.

Sudre refined this technique and dubbed it "mordançage." His process has since been adopted by some of his students, and has spread from there. Sudre's American student, Elizabeth Opalenik, created what is now known as the "draping effect" in the Mordançage process.

== Chemistry ==
The mordançage solution consists of the following materials.

- 10 g copper(II) chloride
- 50 mL glacial acetic acid
- 25 mL 30%-35% hydrogen peroxide
- distilled water to make 1 liter

== Process ==
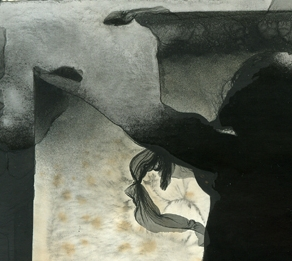
Detail of a mordançage print on matte fiber based paper. Oxidation, veiling, and bleaching effects are visible.

The mordançage process can be used to treat either fiber-based or resin-coated paper. After making a silver gelatin print, the photograph is placed in the mordançage solution, and left in until the image has bleached. The hydrogen peroxide in the solution softens the gelatin in the emulsion. Next, the chemicals are rinsed off of the print. Some people choose to remove the parts of the emulsion that have started to disintegrate while washing; these areas will be the darkest portions of the print.

After cleaning, the print is redeveloped. A variety of fresh or exhausted developers can be used at various dilutions, as well as some toners. Different developers and dilutions will result in different tonalities in the paper. Areas where the emulsion has been degraded may redevelop unevenly. Emulsion removal can cause a reversal effect when redeveloped. Once the image has been redeveloped, it is rinsed off again. The print can be fixed in fixer at this point. Neglecting to fix the image can lead to the oxidation of the print, however these color shifts can be a desirable effect.

A final washing of the print is performed after fixing. Any veils that have developed are fragile, which makes the print difficult to wash without causing them to pull away from the paper. Because of this difficulty, mordançage prints will often remain imbued with chemicals. The chemical saturation of the paper can lead to these prints contaminating work areas and other photographs.

While the process often follows this progression, it can be altered. Development of the print can be halted at any point in the process through the use of stop bath. Alternatively, sometimes prints will be bleached and redeveloped multiple times until the artist is happy with the results.

== Preservation ==
Photographs that have not been properly fixed and washed can shift color over time through oxidation and acid migration. As with any photographic print, mordançage prints are degraded by exposure to light, humidity, and high temperatures. The mordançage solution is acidic, so these prints can contaminate other materials. Photographs can be interleaved with alkaline buffered paper, or sleeved in polyethylene to help prevent acid migration.
