= Van Dyke brown =

Brown earth pigment

Colour coordinates
- Hex triplet: #44362F
- sRGB^{B} (r, g, b): (68, 54, 47)
- HSV (h, s, v): (20°, 31%, 27%)
- CIELCh_{uv} (L, C, h): (24, 10, 37°)
- Source: SHW
- ISCC–NBS descriptor: Dark blackish grey-brown
- B: Normalized to [0–255] (byte)

Van Dyke (Vandyke) brown, also known as Cassel earth or Cologne earth, is a deep, rich, and warm brown colour often used in photography, painting and printmaking. Early publications on the pigment refer to it as Cassel (or Kassel) earth or Cologne earth in reference to its city of origin; however, today it is typically called Van Dyke brown after the painter Anthony van Dyck.

The colour was originally made from peat or soil, and has been applied as both watercolour and oil paints. Today, the pigment is made by combining asphaltum-like black with iron oxide. This replicates the colour of the original iron oxide-rich earth found in Cassel and Cologne, Germany.

== History ==
Although the color is named after Anthony van Dyck, the origins of the pigment predate the painter by several centuries. The first use of Van Dyke brown is thought to date from as early as the sixteenth century. Manuscripts from the early seventeenth century testify to its use. Inconsistent use of terminology in historical sources has caused uncertainly as to how extensively the color was used in the past. Van Dyke brown was initially used in watercolor, oil, and encaustic, but in the nineteenth century its use spread to miniatures, crayons, and wood stains.

== Visual properties and permanence ==
Van Dyke brown is typically made by mixing raw umber or burnt sienna with black pigment, and as a rich, dark brown color, it is often used to create shadows and depth and can be mixed with other colors to create a range of earthy tones. Depending on how it is used and combined with other colors, Van Dyke brown can create a range of effects and moods in an artwork.

Since the nineteenth century, the sensitivity of Van Dyke brown to light has been a recurring preoccupation in literature on the pigment. Modern technical studies assess it to have poor to medium lightfastness. A study on the photochemical color change of traditional watercolor pigments in low oxygen levels took samples of Van Dyke brown from the nineteenth century and found that oxygen exposure did not affect the fading.

== Notable uses ==
Despite being named for Anthony van Dyck, the pigment has not been found in technical analyses of his work. The pigment has been identified by infrared spectroscopy in numerous American paintings from the Upper Hudson Valley in the first half of the nineteenth century. The Doerner Institute in Munich has identified the pigment in sixty-one paintings, the majority of which are from the nineteenth century.

Television host Bob Ross frequently used Van Dyke brown oil paint on The Joy of Painting as a color for trees, cabins, and basecoats.

== See also ==
- Lists of colors
