= Mike Ware (photographer) =

Photographer and chemist

Mike Ware FRSC FRPS
- Born: 1939
- Alma mater: University of Oxford
- Awards: Hood Medal (1990)
- Website: www.mikeware.co.uk/mikeware/main.html
- Academic career
- Thesis: The vibrational spectra of some inorganic complexes

Michael J. Ware (born 1939, Bromley) FRSC FRSC is a chemist and photographer, known for his work in alternative photographic processes, earlier methods of printing photographic images that were succeeded by the more common silver-gelatin used today. In the Present, Ware acts as a consultant, most recently on the history and development of the platinotype and palladium processes. His has also written about chemistry's influence on the history of photography.

== Early life and education ==
Ware was born in 1939 in Bromley. He earned his Ph.D. at the University of Oxford in 1965. His thesis was The vibrational spectra of some inorganic complexes.

== Awards and honours ==
- 1982 Fellow of the Royal Society of Chemistry
- 1990 Hood Medal, awarded by the Royal Photographic Society

== Selected publications ==
=== Academic works ===
- Mike Ware (1 October 2005). "Photography in Platinum and Palladium". Johnson Matthey Technology Review. 49 (4): 190–195. doi:10.1595/147106705X70291. ISSN 0032-1400. Wikidata Q55898495.
- Anne K. Powell; John M. Charnock; Annette C. Flood; C. David Garner; Michael J. Ware; William Clegg (1992). "Crystal structures and extended X-ray absorption fine structure spectra of [Fe{O(CH2CO2)2}(H2O)2X](X = Cl or Br)". Dalton transactions RSC (2): 203. doi:10.1039/DT9920000203. ISSN 1364-5447. Wikidata Q57967349.
- J. LEWIS; A. R. MANNING; J. R. MILLER; M. J. WARE; F. NYMAN (July 1965). "Use of Combination Bands in the Vibrational Spectroscopy of Metal Carbonyls". Nature. 207 (4993): 142–145. Bibcode:1965Natur.207..142L. doi:10.1038/207142A0. ISSN 1476-4687. Wikidata Q59084906.

=== Published books ===
- Mike Ware (1999). Cyanotype : The History, Science and Art of Photographic Printing in Prussian Blue. Gardners Books. ISBN 978-1-900-74707-3. OL 22242070M. Wikidata Q105415348.
- Mike Ware (1994). Mechanisms of Image Deterioration in Early Photographs: The Sensitivity to Light of W.H.F. Talbot's Halide-fixed Images 1834-1844. ISBN 978-0-901-80578-2. OL 11363069M. Wikidata Q105415405.
