= Platinum print =

Type of photographic print

A platinum print or platinotype is a photographic print in which platinum forms the image on paper. The paper is sensitized with iron and platinum salts and is usually printed in direct contact with a negative. Platinum prints are noted for their permanence, wide tonal range, subtle gradations and matte surface.

Experiments with platinum photography began in the 1830s, but a practical platinotype process was first patented by William Willis in 1873. Commercial platinum papers became widely available in the late 19th century, before rising prices and shortages during the First World War led most manufacturers to stop producing them. Platinum printing itself continued in use, interrupted by the world wars, and was later taken up by photographers including Irving Penn.

Palladium can be used instead of, or together with, platinum. Palladium printing became more common after the First World War as platinum grew more expensive, and modern platinum/palladium printers generally coat their own paper because pre-coated sensitized paper is no longer available.

== Characteristics ==
Platinum prints are noted for their permanence, wide tonal range with subtle gradations, and matte surface. Unlike the gelatin silver process, in which the image-forming silver is held in a gelatin layer, the platinum image is formed directly in or on the paper. Platinum prints are among the most durable photographic processes.

== History ==
The first person to have recorded observing the action of light rays on platinum was Ferdinand Gehlen of Germany in 1830. The following year, his countryman, Johann Wolfgang Dobereiner, determined that the action of light on platinum was quite weak, but that perhaps something could be combined with platinum to increase its sensitivity. Through experimentation, he eventually found that ferric oxalate was a highly-effective enhancer. The combination of these two metals remains the basis of the platinotype process in use today.

In 1832, Englishmen Sir John Herschel and Robert Hunt conducted their own experiments, further refining the chemistry of the process. In 1844, in his book Researches on Light, Hunt recorded the first known description of anyone employing platinum to make a photographic print. However, although he tried several different combinations of chemicals with platinum, none of them succeeded in producing any permanency in the image. All of his prints faded after several months.

Over the next decade, Hunt noted that platinum prints he had left in the dark faded very slowly but gradually resumed their original density, and had also shifted from a negative to a positive image, eventually becoming permanent.

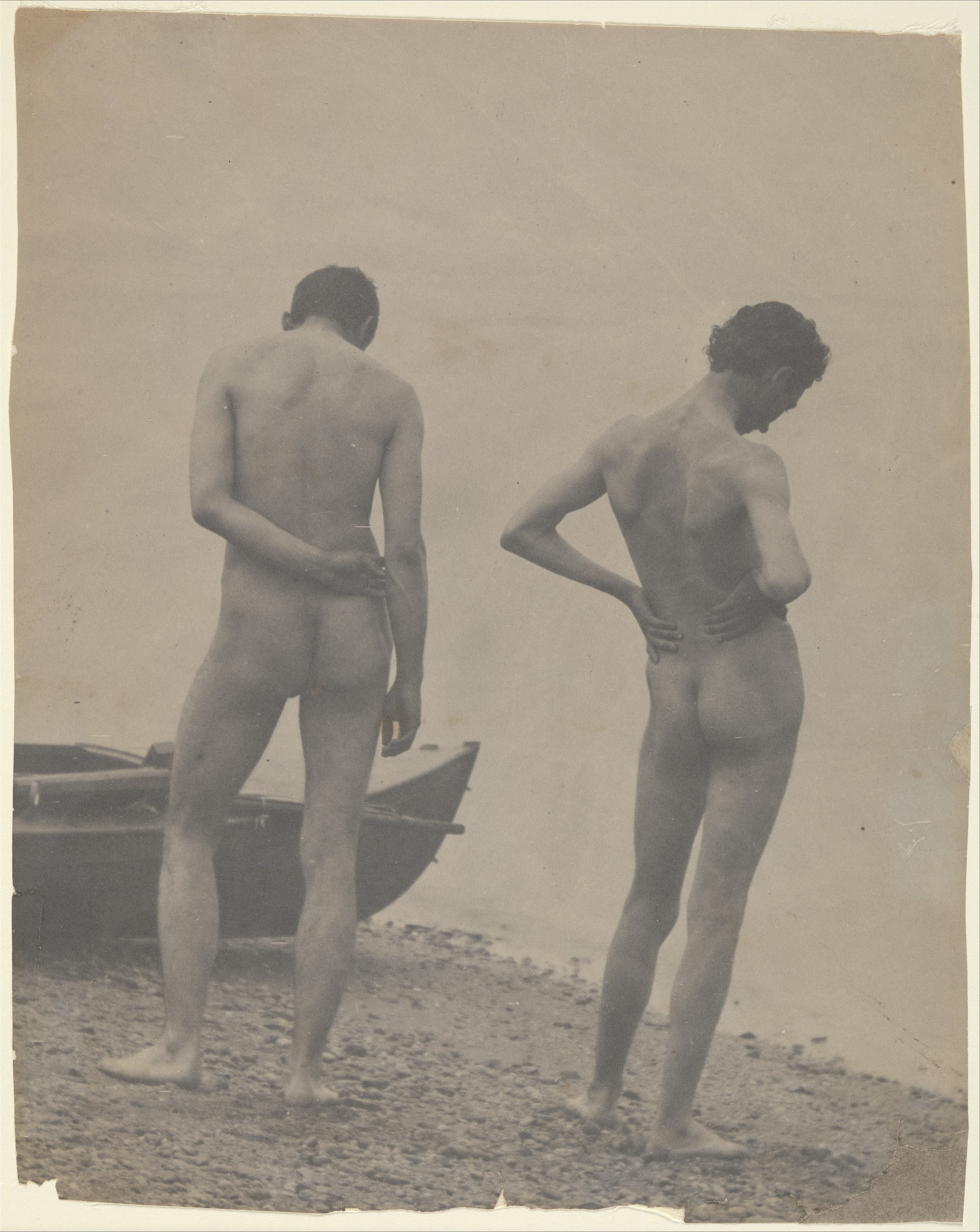
Title: [Thomas Eakins and John Laurie Wallace on a Beach]

By the early 1850s, however, other, more reliable photographic processes, such as salt and albumen printing, had been developed and were beginning to be widely used. Those scientists who had previously researched platinum lost interest in the process as other methods became more commercially viable. The only major advances in platinum research reported during that decade were made independently by C. J. Burnett and Lyonel Clark of Great Britain. In 1859, Burnett published an article in the British Journal of Photography describing his use of sodium chloroplatinate as a fixing agent. His modification of the platinum printing process resulted in prints that were permanent enough that he could exhibit them in public. That same year, Clark also exhibited prints made using a slightly different process.

== Patents ==
William Willis was the first to patent the platinotype process in 1873 (British Patent No. 2011, June 8, 1873), and again in 1878 and 1880, which he leveraged to gain commercial success in the manufacture of platinum papers sold through his Platinotype Company for professional and amateur use. He also developed the palladium process, requiring palladiotype paper and a silver-platinum paper, Satista.

Willis introduced the "hot bath" method, where a mixture of ferric oxalate and potassium chloroplatinate is coated onto paper, which is then exposed through a negative and developed in a warm solution of potassium oxalate.

== Commercialization ==
While Willis had greatly advanced the chemistry of the platinum process, there was still no reliable method for the individual preparation of platinum paper by 1880. Two years later, two Austrian Army officers, Giuseppe Pizzighelli and Arthur Baron V. Hubl, published a dissertation describing a straightforward process for preparing the paper. They continued their research for several years, and in 1887, Pizzighelli patented a new process that made the commercial production of platinum paper viable for the first time. The new process was briefly known as a "Pizzitype" and was marketed under the name "Dr. Jacoby's Printing Out Paper."

Willis quickly countered this advance by obtaining two more patents in 1888 for cold-bath processes. By adding more platinum to the developing process, he produced prints that had dense brown-black shadows rather than the lighter browns that were the best that previous processes could produce. While much more aesthetically pleasing, prints developed by this process were difficult to produce reliably.

Four years later, Willis began manufacturing a platinum paper that was designed for the cold-bath process, and this became the standard for the rest of the decade. The business he started in 1880, called the Platinotype Company, rapidly expanded, and soon he was selling his paper throughout Europe and in the United States. By 1906, his company had sales totaling US $273,715 ($6,535,706 in 2009 dollars), a significant amount at that time.

Seeing the skyrocketing demand for platinum paper, the Eastman Kodak Company in Rochester, New York, tried to develop its own line of paper starting in 1901, but they could not duplicate the quality of Willis's product. Kodak then tried to buy Willis's company but was not able to come to an agreement. Kodak instead bought the relatively new company of Joseph Di Nunzio who had recently developed his own brand of platinum paper comparable to Willis's, which he sold under the name of "Angelo". Kodak continued to sell this paper for several years before it was eventually discontinued.

When Willis began marketing his paper, platinum was relatively cheap. By 1907, platinum had become 52 times more expensive than silver. Eastman Kodak and most other producers stopped fabrication of the paper in 1916. Russia controlled 90% of the world platinum supply in World War I and all available platinum was used in the war effort. Nevertheless, platinum paper has continued in use until the present, interrupted only by the world wars.

Beginning in 1964, Irving Penn began experimenting with platinum printing. Penn had spent his career up to that point making photographs that were seen almost exclusively in reproduction within the glossy pages of magazines and in his pivotal 1960 book Moments Preserved. Penn set himself the challenge of producing photographic prints that would surpass the technical limitations of reprographic media and deliver a deeper visual experience. He was drawn to the antiquated platinum process for its long grayscale – its ability to display a seemingly infinite array of gradations between pure white and absolute black.

The platinum process requires direct contact with the negative, without enlargement, so Penn first needed to create flawless negatives the same size as the desired print. He then hand-coated paper with platinum emulsion. When dry, the paper was sandwiched with the negative and exposed to light before processing. Rigorous experimentation revealed that recoating a print with a secondary emulsion and making a second or third exposure of the same image on a single sheet of paper yielded prints of greater depth and subtlety. Penn solved the problem of aligning and re-aligning the negative and the print surface over multiple exposures by borrowing a technique from the graphic arts: he mounted his paper on a sheet of aluminum with a series of registration guides along the top edge. Penn was guarded about the preparation of his emulsions and his precise formulations varied considerably. He frequently introduced palladium and iron salts into his coatings to achieve desired effects.

== Palladium ==
In photography, the palladiotype is a less-common variant of the platinotype. The process came into greater use after World War I because the platinum used in the more-common platinotype quickly became too expensive. Due to the rising cost and the consequent shortage of commercial platinum paper, photographers tried to replace the platinum with the much cheaper palladium which gave similar effects. The cost of this metal, however, also started to rise and eventually around 1930 the process was abandoned in favor of more economical alternatives. In recent years, a handful of photographers have taken up the art of mixing platinum and palladium and printing fine art prints with those chemicals, despite its cost.

Characteristics of a palladium print, compared to a platinum print:

- A warmer tone
- Easier to solarize (see the Sabatier Effect)
- Large tonal range, up to D= 2.1, thus requiring a contrast-rich negative for printing
- Deeper blacks, with a higher maximum density
- A softer image, with delicate highlights

== Chemistry ==
Platinum printing is based on the light sensitivity of ferric oxalate. Ferric oxalate is reduced to ferrous oxalate by UV-light. The ferrous oxalate then reacts with platinum(II) or palladium(II) reducing it to elemental platinum (or palladium), which builds up the image.

By varying the amount of platinum versus palladium and the addition of oxidizing chemicals such as hydrogen peroxide and potassium dichromate or potassium chlorate, the contrast and "color" of the final image can be modified. Because of the non-uniformity of the coating and mixing phases of the process, no two prints are exactly the same.

In 2002, working from research done by Howard Efner and Richard Sullivan, Dick Arentz formulated the methodology for using sodium chloroplatinate as a contrast control agent. Richard Sullivan coined the term Na2 and began to sell a 20% solution through Bostick and Sullivan. Arentz found that, since it is a platinum compound (sodium chloroplatinATE), it does not work with platinum prints (potassium chloroplatinITE). It does, however, shorten the scale of a pure palladium print. When minute quantities of sodium chloroplatinate are added to the palladium salt/ferric oxalate emulsion it produces the high-contrast prints needed for thin negatives, but does not exhibit the granularity found when using traditional chlorates. A palladium print made with potassium chlorate will take on a warm, sepia tone. The same print using sodium chloroplatinate will have cooler tones similar to those of a platinum/palladium print.

The inherent low sensitivity of the process occurs because the ferric oxalate is sensitive to ultraviolet light only, thus specialized light sources must be used and exposure times are many times greater than those used in silver-based photographic processes.

Due to the unavailability of pre-coated sensitized paper, all platinum/palladium printing is done on paper coated by the printer. The light sensitive chemicals are mixed from powdered basic chemicals, or some commercially available solutions, then hand applied with a brush or a cylindrical "pusher".

Many artists achieve varying effects by choosing different papers for different surface characteristics, including vellum, 100% cotton rag, silk, and rice, among others. On the collecting market, platinum prints often sell for many times what a similar silver-gelatin print would bring.

== Notable photographers using the technique ==
- Dick Arentz
- George Charles Beresford
- Manuel Álvarez Bravo
- Alvin Langdon Coburn
- Lois Conner – Sahinefendi, Goreme, Turkey at the Museum of Modern Art
- Imogen Cunningham – The Wind at the Metropolitan Museum of Art, Clare Shepard at the Metropolitan Museum of Art
- Edward S. Curtis
- F. Holland Day – Study of Head of Christ at the Art Institute of Chicago, Menelek at the Art Institute of Chicago, Ebony and Ivory at the Metropolitan Museum of Art, Ebony and Ivory at the J. Paul Getty Museum
- Thomas Eakins – [Thomas Eakins and John Laurie Wallace on a Beach] at the Metropolitan Museum of Art
- Olive Edis – William McTaggart at the National Portrait Gallery
- Frederick H. Evans – Aubrey Beardsley at the Metropolitan Museum of Art, "A Sea of Steps," Wells Cathedral at the Museum of Modern Art
- Laura Gilpin
- Naohisa Hara
- Frederick Hollyer
- Gertrude Kasebier
- Sal Lopes
- Robert Mapplethorpe – Ken and Tyler at the Guggenheim, Self Portrait at the Guggenheim, Coral Sea at the Metropolitan Museum of Art
- Andrea Modica
- Tina Modotti
- Irving Penn – Cigarette No. 98, New York at the Metropolitan Museum of Art
- Ted Preuss
- Tom Sandberg
- J. Shimon & J. Lindemann
- Edward Steichen – The Flatiron at the Metropolitan Museum of Art (this work uses pigment over platinum to add color)
- Alfred Stieglitz – Georgia O'Keeffe at the Metropolitan Museum of Art
- Paul Strand – Blind Woman, New York at the Metropolitan Museum of Art, Market Woman with Basket, Mexico at the Philadelphia Museum of Art, The Italian, New York at the Philadelphia Museum of Art
- George A. Tice
- Robert Vano
- Edward Weston – Ted Shawn at the Metropolitan Museum of Art
- Clarence H. White – Blindman's Buff at the Museum of Modern Art

== See also ==
- Photographic processes
