= 1839 =

1839 in various calendars
- Gregorian calendar: 1839; MDCCCXXXIX
- Ab urbe condita: 2592
- Armenian calendar: 1288; ԹՎ ՌՄՁԸ
- Assyrian calendar: 6589
- Balinese saka calendar: 1760–1761
- Bengali calendar: 1245–1246
- Berber calendar: 2789
- British Regnal year: 2 Vict. 1 – 3 Vict. 1
- Buddhist calendar: 2383
- Burmese calendar: 1201
- Byzantine calendar: 7347–7348
- Chinese calendar: 戊戌年 (Earth Dog); 4536 or 4329 — to — 己亥年 (Earth Pig); 4537 or 4330
- Coptic calendar: 1555–1556
- Discordian calendar: 3005
- Ethiopian calendar: 1831–1832
- Hebrew calendar: 5599–5600
- Hindu calendars
- Vikram Samvat: 1895–1896
- Shaka Samvat: 1760–1761
- Kali Yuga: 4939–4940
- Holocene calendar: 11839
- Igbo calendar: 839–840
- Iranian calendar: 1217–1218
- Islamic calendar: 1254–1255
- Japanese calendar: Tenpō 10 (天保１０年)
- Javanese calendar: 1766–1767
- Julian calendar: Gregorian minus 12 days
- Korean calendar: 4172
- Minguo calendar: 73 before ROC 民前73年
- Nanakshahi calendar: 371
- Thai solar calendar: 2381–2382
- Tibetan calendar: ས་ཕོ་ཁྱི་ལོ་ (male Earth-Dog); 1965 or 1584 or 812 — to — ས་མོ་ཕག་ལོ་ (female Earth-Boar); 1966 or 1585 or 813

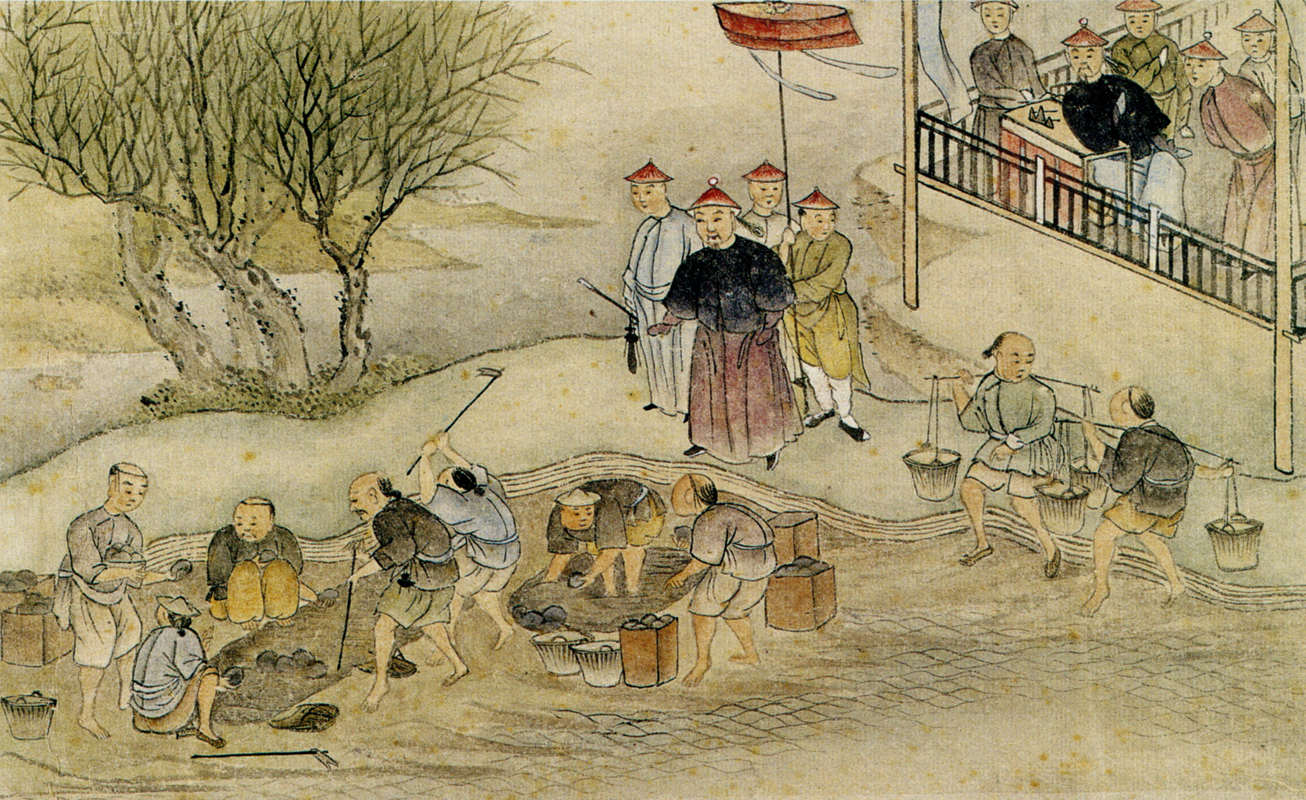
June 3: China's Imperial Commissioner Lin Zexu begins month-long program of destroying opium seized from British traders, triggering the First Opium War

1839 (MDCCCXXXIX) was a common year starting on Tuesday of the Gregorian calendar and a common year starting on Sunday of the Julian calendar, the 1839th year of the Common Era (CE) and Anno Domini (AD) designations, the 839th year of the 2nd millennium, the 39th year of the 19th century, and the 10th and last year of the 1830s decade. As of the start of 1839, the Gregorian calendar was 12 days ahead of the Julian calendar, which remained in localized use until 1923.

== Events ==
=== January–March ===
- January 2 – The first photograph of the Moon is taken, by French photographer Louis Daguerre.
- January 6 – Night of the Big Wind: Ireland is struck by the most damaging cyclone in 300 years.
- January 9 – The French Academy of Sciences announces the daguerreotype photography process.
- January 19 – The British Aden Expedition captures Aden.
- January 20 – Battle of Yungay: Chile defeats the Peru–Bolivian Confederation, leading to the restoration of an independent Peru.
- January – The first parallax measurement of the distance to Alpha Centauri is published by Thomas Henderson.
- February 11 – The University of Missouri is established, becoming the first public university west of the Mississippi River.
- February 24 – William Otis receives a U.S. patent for the steam shovel.
- March 5 – Longwood University is founded in Farmville, Virginia.
- March 7 – Baltimore City College, the third public high school in the United States, is established in Baltimore, Maryland.
- March 9
  - The Anti-Corn Law League is founded in Manchester, England.
  - The Pastry War between France and Mexico ends.
  - Prussia imposes the Child Labor Law of 1839, becoming the first nation in the world to place restrictions on child labor.
- March 23
  - An earthquake in the Kingdom of Burma kills more than 400 people and destroys three cities, as well as heavily damaging the capital at Ava.
  - The Boston Morning Post first records the use of "O.K." (oll korrect).
- March 26 – The first Henley Royal Regatta is held on the River Thames in England.

=== April–June ===
- April 9 – The world's first commercial electric telegraph line comes into operation, alongside the Great Western Railway line in England, from London Paddington station to West Drayton.
- April 19 – The Treaty of London establishes Belgium as a kingdom, with its independence and neutrality guaranteed by the great powers of Europe. Half of the Limburg province of Belgium is added to the Netherlands, giving rise to a Belgian Limburg and Dutch Limburg (the latter being joined (from September 5) to the German Confederation).
- April 24 – Boston University is established as the Newbury Biblical Institute in Vermont.
- May 7–11 – The Bedchamber Crisis in the United Kingdom: Following the announcement by Prime Minister Lord Melbourne that he intends to resign, Robert Peel asks (for political reasons) that Queen Victoria dismiss some of her personal attendants, Ladies of the Bedchamber, as a condition for his forming a government. Victoria refuses to accept the condition and Melbourne is persuaded to stay on as Prime Minister.
- 13 May – First Rebecca Riots targeted against turnpikes in Wales, at Efailwen in Carmarthenshire.
- May 12 – Socialist activist Louis Auguste Blanqui and the Société des Saisons begin an uprising against the government of France. The insurrection is suppressed, but not before 50 people are killed and 190 wounded. Blanqui is imprisoned until 1848.
- May 22 – Former British statesman Lord Durham, as President of the New Zealand Company, formally asks the British government for permission to colonize New Zealand, and to establish a colonial government under the sovereignty of the United Kingdom.
- May 23 – Turkish troops cross the Euphrates River and invade Syria, but are defeated in battle in June.
- June 3 – Destruction of opium at Humen begins, casus belli for Britain to open the 3-year First Opium War against Qing dynasty China. A rapid rise in the sale of opium in China to over 40,000 chests (~56,000 kilograms (123,000 lb) per annum) has caused the Chinese government to dispatch scholar-official Lin Zexu to Guangzhou to deal with the growing problem of opium addiction.
- June 22 – Louis Daguerre receives a patent for his camera (commercially available by September at the price of 400 francs).
- June 27 – The emperor of the Sikh Empire, Maharaja Ranjit Singh, dies at 58.

=== July–September ===
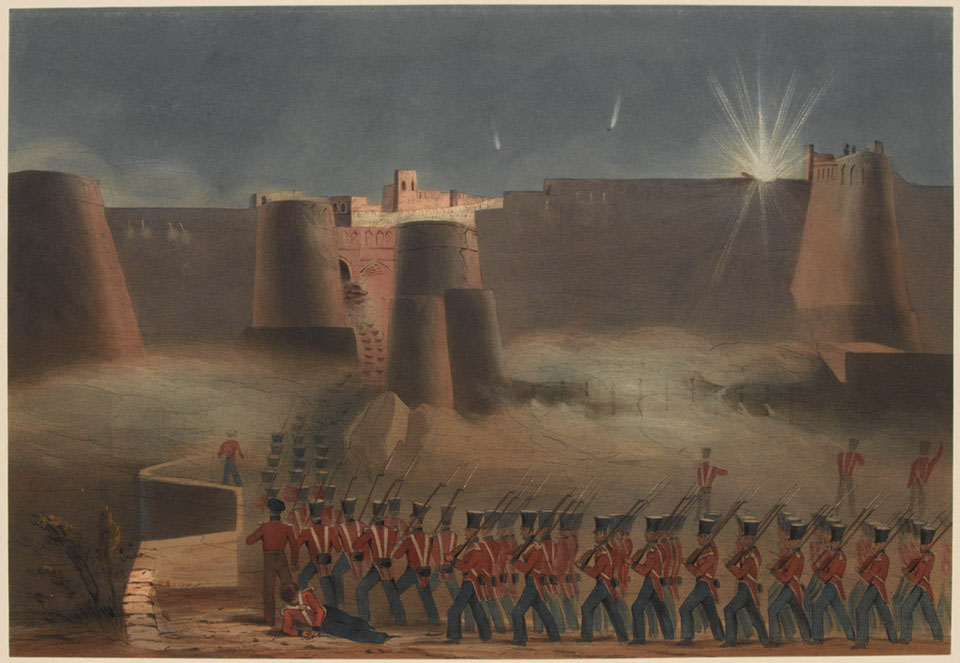
Lithograph depicting the July 23 storming of the fortress during the Battle of Ghazni.

- July 1
  - Slaves aboard the Amistad rebel, and capture the ship.
  - Abdülmecid I (1839–1861) succeeds Mahmud II (1808–1839) as Ottoman Emperor.
- July 23 – First Anglo-Afghan War: Battle of Ghazni – British forces capture the fortress city of Ghazni in Afghanistan.
- August 8 – The Fraternity of Beta Theta Pi is founded by John Reily Knox at Miami University.
- August 19 – The French government gives the daguerreotype "for the whole world".
- August 31 – The First Carlist War (Spain) ends with the Convenio de Vergara, also known as the Abrazo de Vergara ("the embrace in Vergara"; Bergara in Basque), between liberal general Baldomero Espartero, Count of Luchana and Carlist General Rafael Maroto.
- September 4 – Battle of Kowloon: British vessels open fire on Chinese war junks enforcing a food sales embargo on the British community in China in the first armed conflict of the First Opium War.

=== October–December ===
- October 3 – A railway between Naples and Portici (7.4 km (4.6 mi)) in the Kingdom of the Two Sicilies is inaugurated by King Ferdinand II of Bourbon as the first line in the Italian Peninsula.
- October 15 – Emir Abdelkader declares a jihad against the French.
- November 4 – Newport Rising: Between 5,000 and 10,000 Chartist sympathisers march on Newport, Monmouthshire, to liberate Chartist prisoners; around 22 are killed when troops fire on the crowd. This is the last large-scale armed civil rebellion against authority in mainland Britain and sees the most deaths.
- November 11 – The Virginia Military Institute is founded in Lexington, Virginia.
- November 17 – Giuseppe Verdi's first opera, Oberto, conte di San Bonifacio, opens in Milan.
- November 25 – A disastrous cyclone hits India with terrible winds and a giant 40-foot storm surge, wiping out the port city of Coringa; 300,000 people die.
- November 27 – The American Statistical Association is founded in Boston, Massachusetts.
- December 6 – The Whig Party (United States), at its first ever national convention, in Harrisburg, Pennsylvania, nominates former U.S. Army General William Henry Harrison to be its candidate for President of the United States in the 1840 election. Although Senator Henry Clay of Kentucky has received 103 of the 128 necessary votes on the first ballot, he obtains only 90 on the final vote, while Harrison gets 148. Former U.S. Senator John Tyler is unanimously nominated for vice president.
- December 26 – Heinola in the Grand Duchy of Finland is granted town rights by Czar Nicholas I.

=== Date unknown ===
- The United Kingdom, backed by the Russian Empire and the Austrian Empire, compels July Monarchy France to abandon Muhammad Ali of Egypt, and forces him to return Syria and Arabia to the Ottoman Empire.
- Khalid bin Saud Al Suad usurps the throne from Faisal bin Turki bin Abdullah Al Saud, who assumed power of Nejd in 1834, and is sent to Cairo as prisoner. Omar bin Ofaysan, the Amir Faisal's governor in the Eastern Province seeks asylum in Bahrain, but Khalid the pretender demands his surrender and the surrender of the fort at Dammam; then under the control of the Al Khalifa of Bahrain.
- Khorshid Pasha vows to attack Bahrain to exert Egyptian rule over Bahrain, but his attack is prevented after Shaikh Abdulla bin Ahmed of Bahrain pays tribute.
- A quarrel breaks out between the Chief of Abu Dhabi of the Beniyas tribe, Shaikh Khalifa bin Shakboot, and the fugitives who settled there after their departure from Bahrain, the Al Binali tribe. Under the command of their leader, Isa bin Tureef Al Binali, they relocate to Kenn Island where they exercise depredations over the Bahraini and other Gulf vessels. Their motive is to restore their belongings which they abandoned upon leaving Bahrain.
- Tanzimat starts in the Ottoman Empire.
- Emperor Minh Mạng renames Việt Nam to Đại Nam.
- In the United States, the first state law permitting women to own property is passed in Jackson, Mississippi.
- Michael Faraday publishes Experimental Researches in Electricity, clarifying the true nature of electricity.
- Charles Goodyear vulcanizes rubber.
- Valley Falls Company, a predecessor of Berkshire Hathaway, a conglomerate and holdings company in the United States, is founded in Rhode Island.
- Chattanooga, Tennessee, is incorporated as a town.
- Galveston, Texas, is incorporated.
- Episcopal High School (Alexandria, Virginia) is founded in Alexandria, Virginia, as the first high school in Virginia.
- John Lloyd Stephens and Frederick Catherwood discover the Mayan ruins of Copán.

== Births ==
=== January–June ===
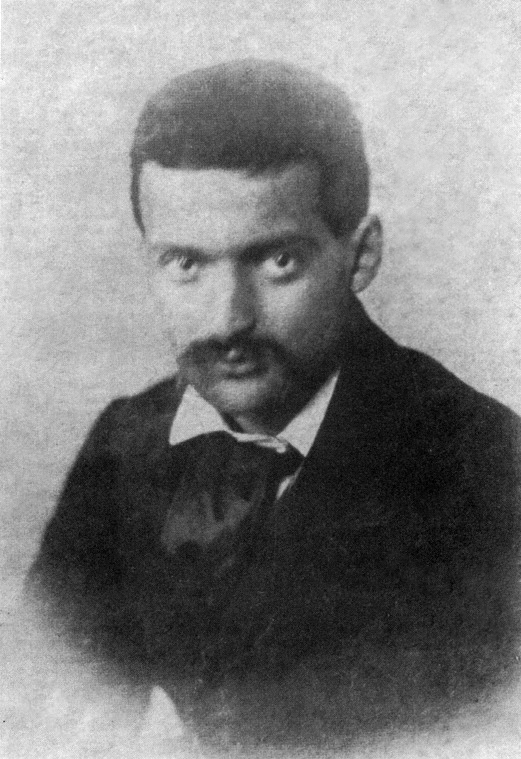
Paul Cézanne

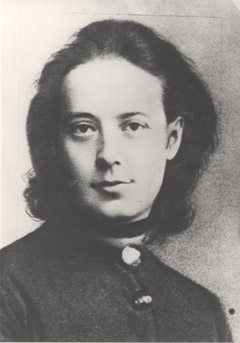
Marianne Hainisch

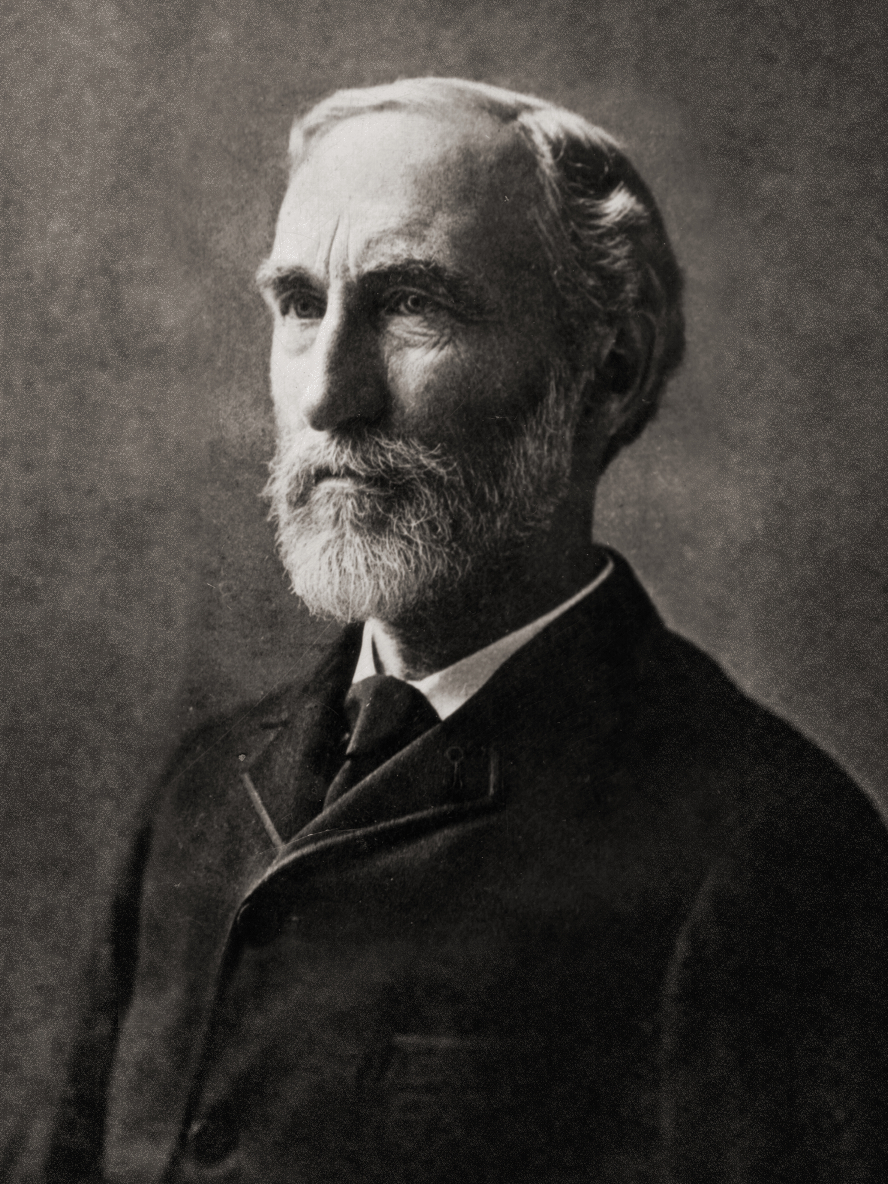
Josiah Willard Gibbs

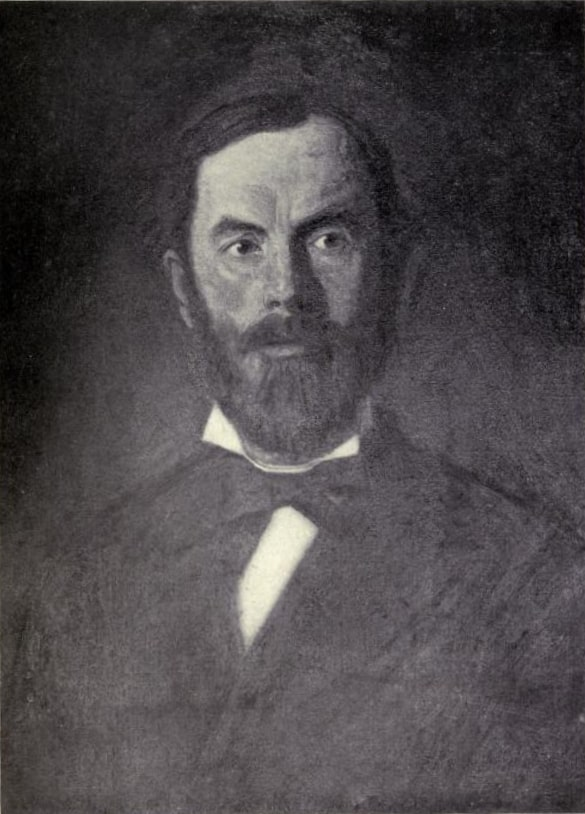
Frederic W. Tilton

- January 2 – Gustave Trouvé, French electrical engineer, inventor (d. 1902)
- January 8 – William A. Clark, American politician, entrepreneur (d. 1925)
- January 9 – John Knowles Paine, American composer (d. 1906)
- January 19 – Paul Cézanne, French painter (d. 1906)
- January 26 – Rachel Lloyd, American chemist (d. 1900)
- February 6 – Caroline Testman, Danish women's rights activist (d. 1919)
- February 11
  - Josiah Willard Gibbs, American physicist, chemist (d. 1903)
  - Almon Brown Strowger, American telecommunications engineer (d. 1902)
- February 15 – Rayko Zhinzifov, Bulgarian poet and translator (d. 1877)
- February 18 – Pascual Cervera y Topete, Spanish admiral (d. 1909)
- February 22 – Francis Pharcellus Church, American editor, publisher (d. 1906)
- March 3 – Jamsetji Tata, Indian Parsi businessman (d. 1904)
- March 8 – Josephine Cochrane, American inventor of the first commercially successful dishwasher (d. 1913)
- March 15 – Daniel Ridgway Knight, American artist (d. 1924)
- March 16
  - Sully Prudhomme, French poet, critic, Nobel Prize laureate (d. 1907)
  - John Butler Yeats, Irish artist (d. 1922)
- March 21 – Modest Mussorgsky, Russian composer (d. 1881)
- March 23 – Julius von Hann, Austrian meteorologist (The father of modern meteorology) (d. 1921)
- March 25
  - Carlo Pellegrini, Italian caricaturist (d. 1889)
  - Marianne Hainisch, founder, leader of the Austrian women's movement (d. 1936)
- March 27 – John Ballance, 14th Premier of New Zealand (d. 1893)
- April 3 – Karl, Freiherr von Prel, German philosopher (d. 1899)
- April 8 – Belle L. Pettigrew, American teacher, missionary (d. 1912)
- April 12 – Nikolay Przhevalsky, Russian explorer (d. 1888)
- April 16 – Antonio Starabba, Marchese di Rudinì, 12th Prime Minister of Italy (d. 1908)
- April 23 – Tom Allen, English boxer (d. 1903)
- April 30
  - Floriano Peixoto, 2nd President of Brazil (d. 1895)
  - Yoshitoshi, Japanese artist (d. 1892)
- May 21 – Mary of the Passion, French Roman Catholic religious sister, missionary, and blessed (d. 1904)
- June 1 – Abdyl Frashëri, Albanian politician (d.1892)
- June 10 – Ludvig Holstein-Ledreborg, Prime Minister of Denmark (d. 1912)
- June 17 – Arthur Tooth, Anglican clergyman prosecuted for Ritualist practices in the 1870s (d. 1931)
- June 21 – Machado de Assis, Brazilian author (d. 1908)

=== July–December ===
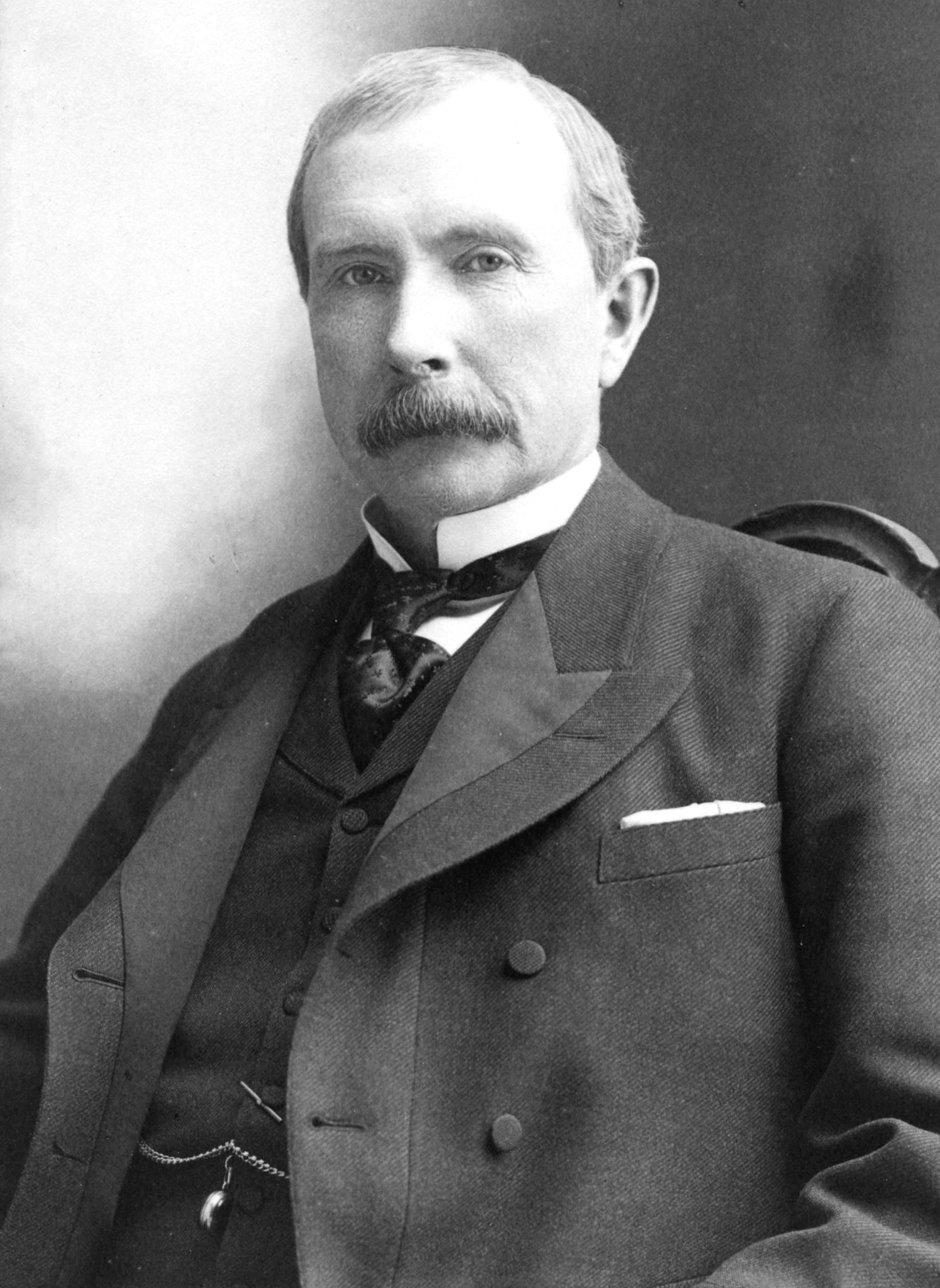
John D. Rockefeller

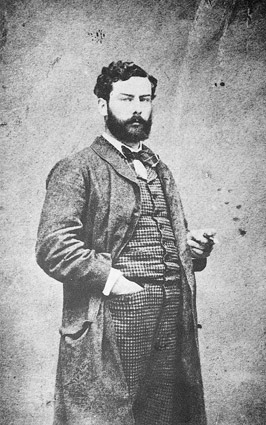
Alfred Sisley

- July – Baba Jaimal Singh, Founder of Radha Soami Satsang Beas (d. 1903)
- July 6 – Édouard Pottier, French admiral (d. 1903)
- July 8 – John D. Rockefeller, American industrialist, philanthropist (d. 1937)
- July 17 – Ephraim Shay, American inventor of the Shay locomotive (d. 1916)
- July 18 – James Surtees Phillpotts, English author (d. 1930)
- July 22 – Jacob Hägg, Swedish admiral and painter (d. 1931)
- July 28 – Isabelle Gatti de Gamond, Italo-Belgian educationalist, feminist, and politician (d. 1905)
- July 31 – Ignacio Andrade, 37th President of Venezuela (d. 1925)
- August 4 – Walter Pater, English essayist, critic (d. 1894)
- August 8 – Nelson A. Miles, American general (d. 1925)
- August 15 – Antonín Petrof, Czech piano maker (d. 1915)
- September 2 – Henry George, American writer, politician, and political economist (d. 1897)
- September 7 – Patricio Montojo y Pasarón, Spanish admiral (d. 1917)
- September 8 – Gregorio Luperón, Dominican soldier, activist and general (d. 1897)
- September 9 – Maria Swanenburg, Dutch serial killer (d. 1915)
- September 10 – Charles Sanders Peirce, American philosopher, logician, mathematician, and scientist (d. 1914)
- September 12 – Mary H. Graves, American minister, literary editor, writer (d. 1908)
- October 2 – Oscar de Négrier, French general (d. 1913)
- October 9
  - Georges Leclanché, French electrical engineer, inventor (d. 1882)
  - Winfield Scott Schley, American admiral (d. 1911)
- October 11 – Jeanne Merkus, Dutch deaconess, guerilla soldier, and political activist (d. 1897)
- October 30 – Alfred Sisley, French Impressionist landscape painter (d. 1899)
- November 1 – Pál Luthár, Slovene writer in Hungary (d. 1919)
- November 1 – Ahmed Muhtar Pasha, Ottoman field marshal (d. 1919)
- November 12 – Frank Furness, American architect, soldier (d. 1912)
- November 18 – Emil Škoda, Czech engineer, industrialist (d. 1900)
- November 20 – Christian Wilberg, German painter (d. 1882)
- November 30 – Catherine Amanda Coburn, American journalist, newspaper editor (d. 1913)
- December 5 – George Armstrong Custer, American cavalry officer (d. 1876)
- December 7 – Sir Redvers Buller, British general, Victoria Cross recipient (d. 1908)
- December 21 – Sherman Conant, American soldier and politician (d. 1890)

=== Date unknown ===
- Avis Crocombe, English cook at Audley End House

== Deaths ==
=== January–June ===
William Farquhar

- January 6 – Princess Marie of Orléans, French princess, artist, and duchess (b. 1813)
- January 7 – Jacquette Löwenhielm, Swedish noble, lady-in-waiting, and mistress of Oscar I of Sweden (b. 1797)
- January 12
  - Edward Coleman, gangster and founder of the Forty Thieves
  - Joseph Anton Koch, Austrian painter (b. 1768)
- January 14 – John Wesley Jarvis, American painter (b. 1780/1781)
- January 24 – Michele Cachia, Maltese architect, military engineer (b. 1760)
- January 28 – William Beechey, British portraitist (b. 1753)
- February 7 – Karl August Nicander, Swedish poet (b. 1799)
- February 8 – William Williams, English politician (b. 1774)
- February 10 – Pedro Romero, Spanish torero (b. 1754)
- February 12 – Moulvi Syed Qudratullah, Bengali judge (b. 1750)
- February 26 – Sybil Ludington, alleged heroine during the American Revolutionary War (b. 1761)
- March 2 – Charlotte Napoléone Bonaparte, niece of Emperor Napoleon (b. 1802)
- March 19 – Rachel Plummer, American writer, daughter of James W. Parker, and the cousin of Quanah Parker (b. 1819)
- March 20 – Caspar Voght, German businessman (b. 1752)
- March 28 – Giuseppe Siboni, Italian operatic tenor, opera director, choir conductor, and voice teacher (b. 1780)
- April 1 – Benjamin Pierce, American politician (b. 1757)
- April 2 – Hezekiah Niles, American editor, publisher (b. 1777)
- April 4 – Queen Kaahumanu II of Hawaii
- April 5 – John Tipton, American politician (b. 1786)
- April 8 – Du Pré Alexander, Irish peer, landlord and colonial administrator (b. 1777)
- April 11 – John Galt, Scottish novelist (b. 1779)
- April 15 – Christoph August Gabler, German classical composer (b. 1767)
- April 22
  - Denis Davydov, Russian general, poet (b. 1784)
  - Samuel Smith (Maryland politician), American politician (b. 1752)
  - Pär Aron Borg, Swedish educator and a pioneer in the education for the blind and deaf (b. 1776)
- May 3
  - Pehr Henrik Ling, pioneer of physical education in Sweden (b. 1776)
  - José Antonio Mexía, 19th-century Mexican general and politician (b. 1800)
- May 6 – John Batman, Australian grazier, entrepreneur, and explorer (b. 1801)
- May 11
  - Thomas Cooper, American political philosopher (b. 1759)
  - William Farquhar, First British Resident and Commandant of colonial Singapore (b. 1774)
  - Thomas Cooper, Anglo-American economist, college president, and political philosopher (b. 1759)
- May 16 – Edward Clive, British politician who sat in the House of Commons (b. 1754)
- May 17 – Archibald Alison, Scottish author (b. 1757)
- May 24 – Anna Pak Agi, Korean Martyr (b. 1782)
- May 27 – Barbara Yi, Korean Martyr (b. 1825)
- June 10 – Jacob Munch, Norwegian military officer and painter (b. 1776)
- June 19 – Joseph Paelinck, painter from the Southern Netherlands (b. 1781)
- June 23 – Lady Hester Stanhope, English archaeologist (b. 1776)
- June 27
  - Ranjit Singh, Maharaja of The Punjab (Sikh Empire) (b. 1780)
  - Allan Cunningham, English botanist and explorer (b. 1791)
- June 30 – Johan Olof Wallin, Swedish minister, orator, poet and later Archbishop (b. 1779)

=== July–December ===
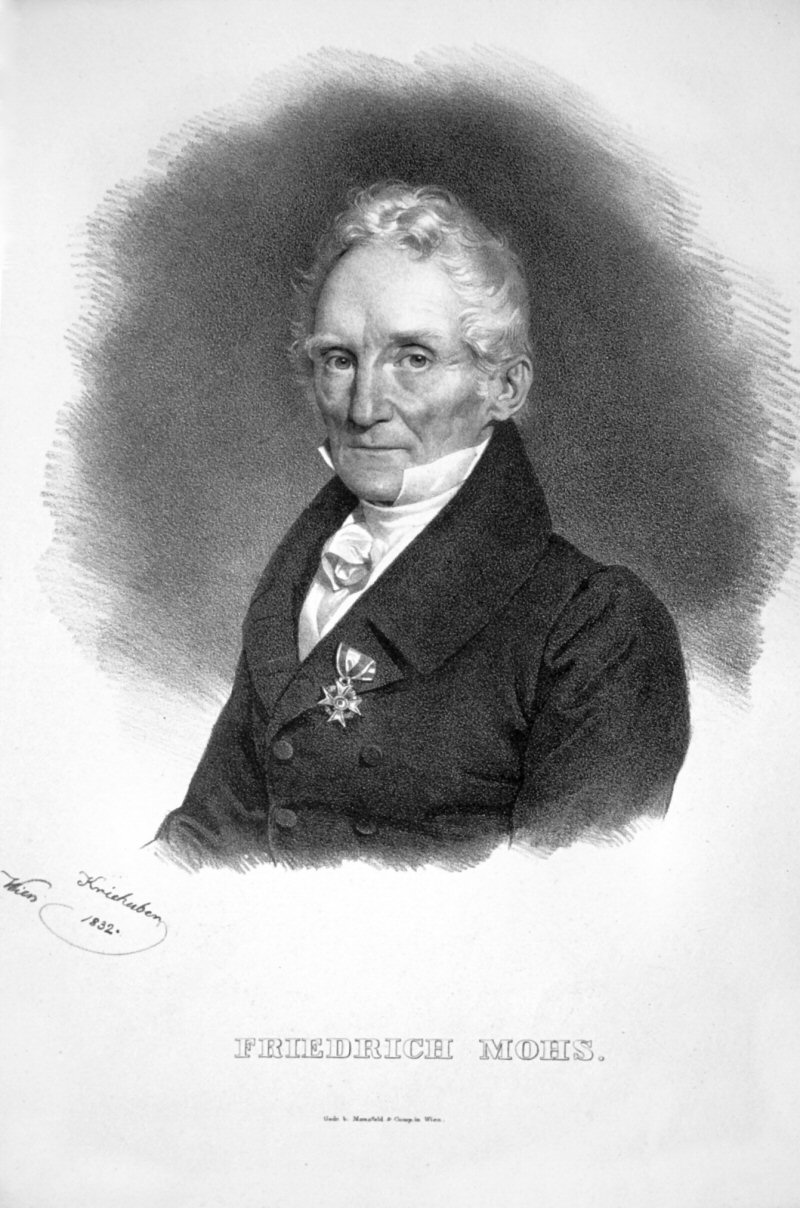
Friedrich Mohs

- July 1 – Mahmud II, Ottoman sultan (b. 1785)
- July 5 – Lady Flora Hastings, British aristocrat and lady-in-waiting (b. 1806)
- July 8 – Fernando Sor, Spanish guitarist, composer (b. 1778)
- July 15 – Winthrop Mackworth Praed, English politician, poet (b. 1802)
- July 16 – Chief Bowles, Cherokee leader (b. ~1756)
- July 19 – Maurice de Guérin, French poet (b. 1810)
- July 20 – John Baptist Yi Kwang-nyol, Korean Martyr (b. c.1800)
- July 22 – John Birdsall, American lawyer and politician (b. 1802)
- July 24 – Richard Spencer, captain of the Royal Navy (b. 1779)
- July 26 – Mervyn Archdall, Irish officer in the British Army and MP for County Fermanagh (b. 1763)
- August 3 – Dorothea von Schlegel, German novelist and translator (b. 1764)
- August 7 – Erasme Louis Surlet de Chokier, politician and first regent of Belgium (b. 1769)
- August 10 – Sir John St Aubyn, 5th Baronet, English fossil collector (b. 1758)
- August 18 – Bendix Frantz Ludwig Schow, member of the nobility of Schleswig-Holstein (b. 1778)
- August 22 – Benjamin Lundy, American abolitionist (b. 1789)
- August 28 – William Smith, English geologist, cartographer (b. 1769)
- September 4 – Hermann Olshausen, German theologian (b. 1796)
- September 10 – James Maitland, 8th Earl of Lauderdale, Scottish politician (b. 1759)
- September 18 – Jeanne-Charlotte Allamand, Swiss-born Canadian pioneer, educator and artist (b. 1760)
- September 21 – Laurent-Joseph-Marius Imbert, French Roman Catholic saint (b. 1796)
- September 22 – Paul Chong Hasang, Korean Roman Catholic saint and martyr (b. 1794/1795)
- September 28 – William Dunlap, producer, playwright, actor, and historian (b. 1766)
- September 29 – Friedrich Mohs, German geologist, mineralogist (b. 1773)
- October 2 – Mary Ann Rundall, British educational writer
- October 6 – William Light, British Army colonel, first Surveyor-General of South Australia (b. 1786)
- October 8 – Ee-mat-la, Seminole chief during the Second Seminole War (b. 1739)
- October 9 – James Oatley, British-born colonial Australian watch and clock maker (b. 1769)
- October 11 – Leonor de Almeida Portugal, 4th Marquise of Alorna, Portuguese painter, poet (b. 1750)
- October 24 – William Charles Ellis, pioneer in treatment of mental illness (b. 1780)
- October 27 – Frederik Hauch, Danish government official (b. 1754)
- October 28 – Makea Pori Ariki, sovereign of the Cook Islands and one of three High Chiefs of Te Au O Tonga (b.
- October 31 – Peter Yu Tae-cholm, Korean Martyr (b. 1826)
- November 15 – William Murdoch, Scottish inventor (b. 1754)
- November 18 – Hans Blackwood, Irish peer and politician (b. 1758)
- November 22 – Vénérande Robichaud, Canadian businesswoman (b. 1753)
- December 2 – Andreas Landmark, Norwegian politician and civil servant (b. 1769)
- December 3 – Frederick VI, King of Denmark, ex-King of Norway (b. 1768)
- December 4 – John Leamy, Irish–American merchant (b. 1757)
- December 15 – Ignaz Aurelius Fessler, Hungarian court councillor, minister to Alexander I (b. 1756)
- December 21 – Andrew Dũng-Lạc, Vietnamese Roman Catholic priest, saint, and martyr (b. 1795)
- December 26 – Laurent Jean François Truguet, French admiral (b. 1752)

=== Date unknown ===
- Thomas Plunket, Irish soldier (b. 1785)
- Walter Jones, Irish politician (b. 1754)
- Pierre le Pelley III, Seigneur of Sark from 1820 to 1839 (b. 1799)
- George Scholey, banker who served as Lord Mayor of London
- Otto Christian von Rohr, Prussian army officer during the Napoleonic Wars
- John D'Arcy, founder of the town of Clifden (b. 1785)
- Jean-François Allard, French soldier and adventurer (b. 1785)
- Edmund Lodge, English officer of arms and a writer on heraldic subjects and short biographies (b. 1756)
- Sankara Varman, astronomer-mathematician (b. 1774)
- William Francklin, English orientalist and army officer (b. 1763)
- Mattheus Ignatius van Bree, Belgian painter (b. 1773)
