= Gabler =

Gabler (or Gäbler) is a surname. Notable people with the surname include:

- Christoph August Gabler (1767–1839), German composer
- Dorit Gäbler (born 1943) is a German stage and film actress and singer
- Frank Gabler (1911–1967), American baseball player
- Fritz Gäbler (1897–1974), German politician
- Gabe Gabler (1930–2014), American baseball player
- Johann Philipp Gabler (1753–1826), German Protestant theologian
- John Gabler (1930–2009), American baseball player
- Josephine Gabler (1879–1961), American physician
- Kathrin Gabler (born 1984), German Egyptologist
- Matt Gabler (born 1983), American politician
- Mel and Norma Gabler (1915–2014; 1923–2007), American activists
- Mike Gabler (born 1970), Winner of Survivor 43
- Milt Gabler (1911–2001), American record producer
- Neal Gabler (born 1950), American journalist
- Roland Gäbler (born 1964), German sailor
- Rosalie Gabler (c.1870–1949), German-British psychotherapist
- Wally Gabler (1944–2025), American football player

== See also ==
- Hedda Gabler, play by Henrik Ibsen
