= Peter Yu (disambiguation) =

Peter Yu (born 1968) is a Singaporean actor.

Peter Yu may also refer to:

- Peter Yu, American politician who ran in the 2018 United States House of Representatives elections in Colorado
- Peter Yu Tae-chol (c. 1826 – 1839), Korean martyr
