= The Ruins of Holyrood Chapel =

Painting by Louis Daguerre

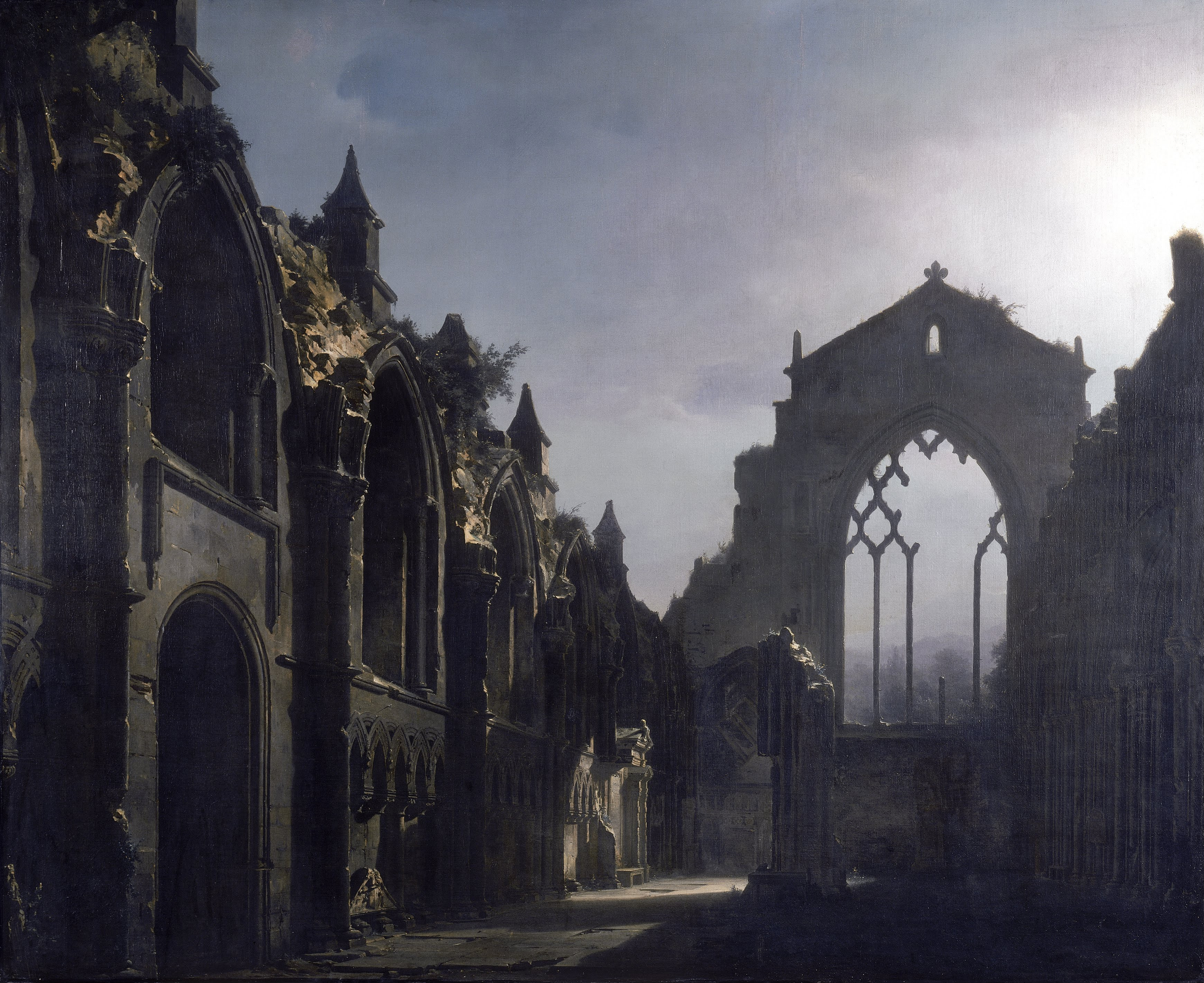
- Artist: Louis Daguerre
- Year: c. 1824
- Medium: Oil on canvas
- Dimensions: 211 cm × 256.3 cm (83 in × 100.9 in)
- Location: Walker Art Gallery, Liverpool

The Ruins of Holyrood Chapel is an oil on canvas painting of the Holyrood Abbey completed around 1824 by the French artist Louis Daguerre. The painting measures 211 × 256.3 cm (83.1 × 100.9 in), and is exhibited at the Walker Art Gallery in Liverpool, England. The museum acquired it in 1864. It featured at the Salon of 1824 at the Louvre in Paris.

== Background ==
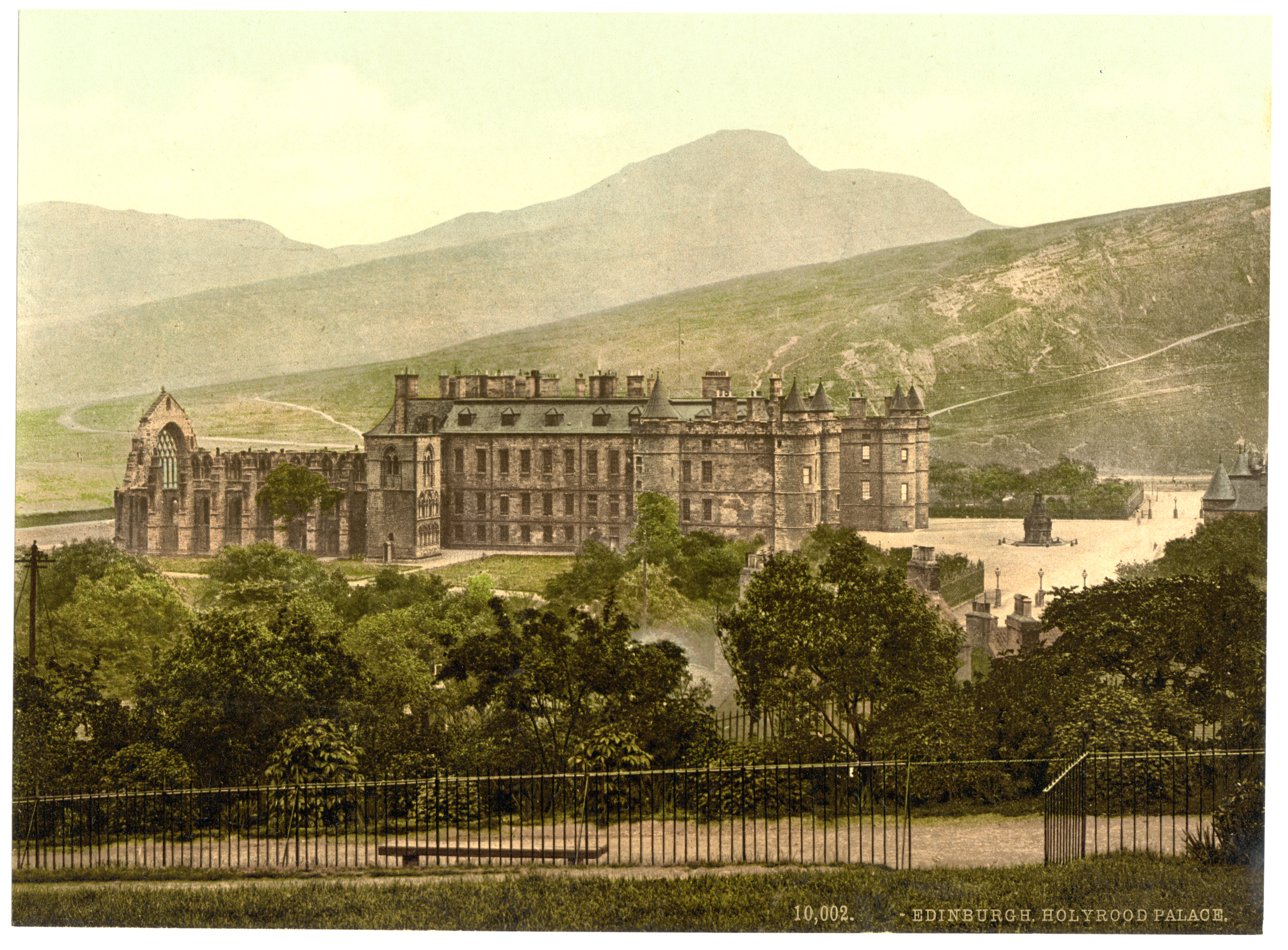
Holyrood Palace as viewed circa 1900. The abbey is on the left.

Holyrood Abbey is located next to the Palace of Holyroodhouse, built by James IV of Scotland in 1501, which became the official residence of the Monarch of the United Kingdom situated in Edinburgh, Scotland. The Abbey started operation in 1128, with various rounds of destruction and reconstruction over the centuries. It has been used as the Parliament of Scotland, the site of coronations, royal weddings, and the location of royal tombs. During a storm in 1768 the roof collapsed, leaving the abbey as it currently stands.

Daguerre, who worked at the time as a stage designer for the theatre, was enamored by dioramas and the contrast of light and shadow. Although it is not known whether Daguerre visited the abbey in person, he created and exhibited a diorama of Holyrood Abbey (along with many other dioramas) in Paris around 1824. The diorama measured 70 feet (21 m) wide. When lit from behind, a small figure could be seen inside the chapel.

Real-life ruins inspired Daguerre, and he used the Holyrood Abbey ruins as a source of inspiration for two paintings, both with the same title. The first painting had the same figure from the diorama visiting the grave of her friend. Daguerre was able to study the way the light hit the interior of the ruins by emulating the scenario with his diorama.

== Description ==
The painting depicts the ruins of Holyrood Abbey during a moonlit scene, which was a popular attraction (in real life) for visitors to the abbey at the time. The perspective and scale of the ruins was altered slightly to fit the walls onto the canvas.

== In Literature ==
Letitia Elizabeth Landon's poem Holyrood was written in response to a visit to the diorama in Regent's Park, London, in 1825.

== Mendelssohn ==
In 1829, a young Felix Mendelssohn embarked on a concert tour which brought him to London. He then travelled north to tour Scotland, and visited Hollyrood Chapel, where he found the inspiration for his Symphony No. 3 in A Minor, Op. 56 "Scottish".
