= Kynžvart Daguerreotype =

Photograph by Louis Daguerre

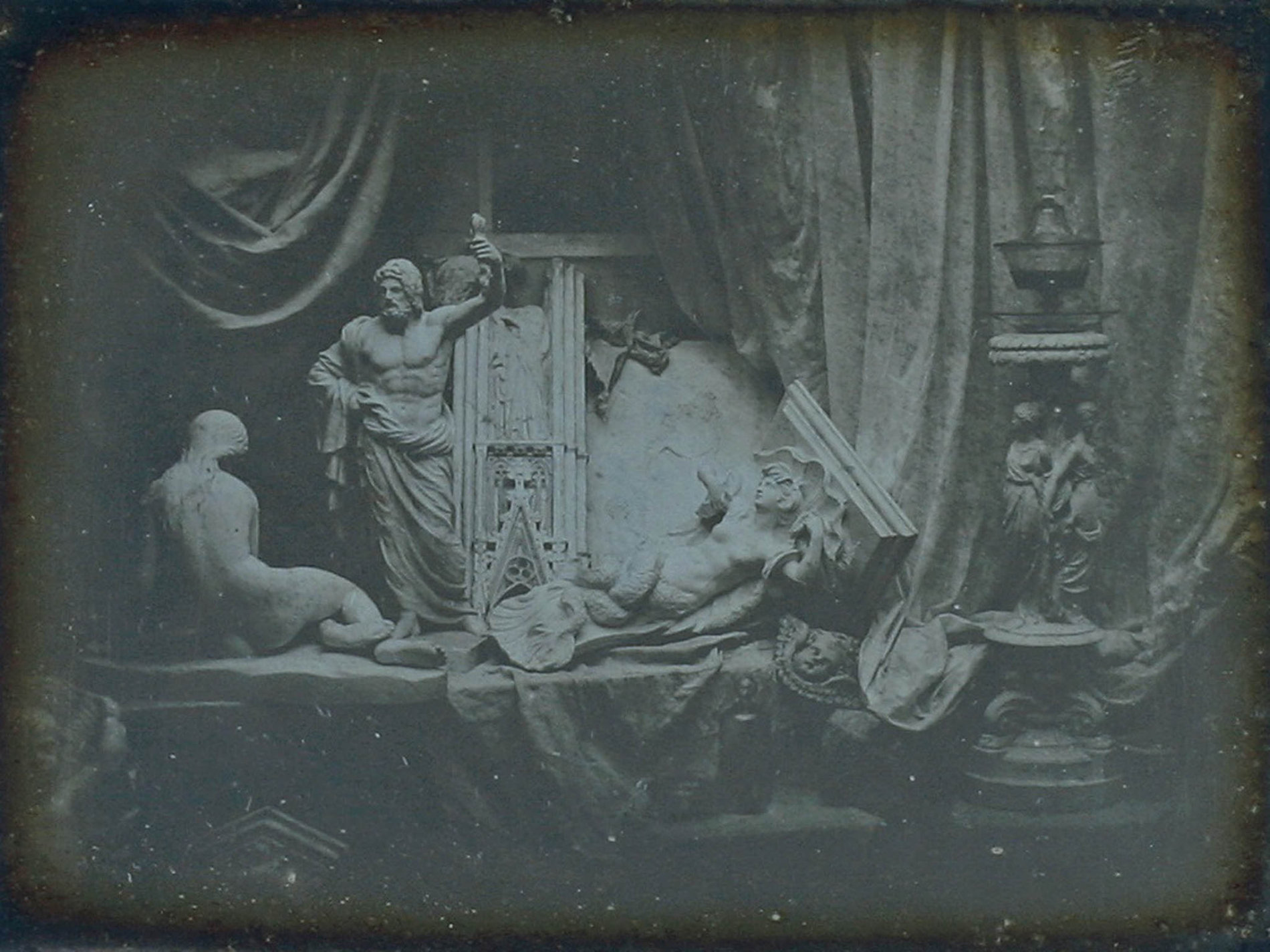
Still Life with Jupiter Tonans

The Kynžvart Daguerreotype (Czech: Kynžvartská daguerrotypie) or Still Life with Jupiter Tonans is an early daguerreotype made in 1839 by Louis Daguerre. It was inscribed in the UNESCO Memory of the World Register in 2017, where it was described as a "highly important document of a new type of visual information carrier". It has also been a Czech national cultural monument, registration number 305, since 2006.

The image depicts several classical statues against a draped background. The most prominent statue is a Jupiter Tonans ('Thundering Jove').

The daguerreotype was gifted to State Chancellor of the Austrian Empire Klemens von Metternich before Daguerre revealed his invention to the French Academy of Sciences on 19 August 1839. As such it is one of the world's oldest surviving photographic images. The dedication on the paper surrounding the daguerreotype reads:

Épreuve ayant servi à constater la découverte du Daguerreotype offerte à Monseigneur le Prince de Metternich par son très humble et très obligeant serviteur Daguerre
Evidence that served to confirm the invention of daguerreotypy dedicated to Prince Metternich by his very humble and very devoted servant Daguerre

The wording of this dedication (the name excepted) is identical to that of another image that Daguerre send to Alphonse de Cailleux, director of the Louvre, in the same year. He similarly sent sample daguerreotypes to Ludwig I of Bavaria, Leopold I of Belgium, Ferdinand I of Austria, Nicholas I of Russia and Frederick William III of Prussia.

It is held at the National Technical Museum in Prague, where it has been on loan from Kynžvart Castle, Metternich's former home, since 1985. It been passed down in the Metternich family until 1945 when it became state property upon the confiscation of Kynžvart Castle. The daguerreotype had been forgotten until it was rediscovered by historian of photography Rudolf Skopec around 1960, according to an interview with his grandson.

== See also ==
- History of photography
