= Wilhelm Stekel =

Austrian physician and psychologist (1868–1940)

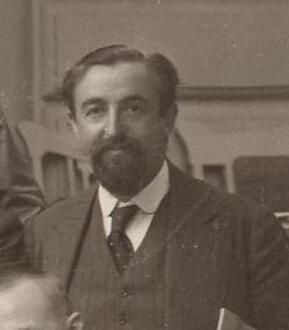
- Wilhelm Stekel in 1911
- Born: 18 March 1868; Boiany, Bukovina, Austria-Hungary (present-day Ukraine)
- Died: 25 June 1940 (aged 72); Kensington, County of London, England
- Occupations: Psychoanalyst; Psychologist
- Known for: Auto-erotism: A Psychiatric Study of Onanism and Neurosis
- Spouse: Hilda Binder Stekel

Wilhelm Stekel (German: [ˈʃteːkəl]; 18 March 1868 – 25 June 1940) was an Austrian physician and psychologist, who became one of Sigmund Freud's earliest followers, and was once described as "Freud's most distinguished pupil". According to Ernest Jones, "Stekel may be accorded the honour, together with Freud, of having founded the first psycho-analytic society". However, a phrase used by Freud in a letter to Stekel, "the Psychological Society founded by you", suggests that the initiative was entirely Stekel's. Jones also wrote of Stekel that he was "a naturally gifted psychologist with an unusual flair for detecting repressed material". Freud and Stekel later had a falling-out, with Freud announcing in November 1912 that "Stekel is going his own way". A letter from Freud to Stekel dated January 1924 indicates that the falling out was on interpersonal rather than theoretical grounds, and that at some point Freud developed a low opinion of his former associate. He wrote: "I...contradict your often repeated assertion that you were rejected by me on account of scientific differences. This sounds quite good in public but it doesn't correspond with the truth. It was exclusively your personal qualities—usually described as character and behavior—which made collaboration with you impossible for my friends and myself." Stekel's works are translated and published in many languages.

== Early life ==
Stekel was born to Jewish parents in 1868 in Boiany (Yiddish Boyan), Bukovina, then an eastern province of the Austro-Hungarian empire, but now divided between Ukraine in the north and Romania in the south. His parents, who were of mixed Ashkenazi and Sephardic background, were relatively poor, a fact which restricted his life choices. However, the fact that he later used "Boyan" as one of his noms de plume seems to corroborate his own account of a happy childhood. His parents enrolled him into a Protestant school.

After an abortive apprenticeship to a shoemaker, he completed his education, matriculating in 1887. He then enlisted as a "one-year-volunteer" with the 9th Company, Prince Eugen's Imperial Infantry Regiment No 41 in Czernowitz [today's Chernivtsi, Ukraine]. Under this scheme he was not obliged to do his military service until 1890, after completing the first part of his medical studies. He was therefore free to enrol at the University of Vienna in 1887, and studied under the eminent sexologist Richard von Krafft-Ebing, Theodor Meynert, Emil Zuckerkandl, (whose son would later marry Stekel's daughter, Gertrude), Ernst Wilhelm von Brücke, Hermann Notnagel, and Max Kassowitz.

From 1886 to 1896 Freud was head of the neurological department at the "1st Public Institute for Sick Children" (otherwise known as the Kassowitz Institute) of which Kassowitz had been the director since 1882. As Stekel worked at this institute during the summer semester of 1891, it seems probable that he knew about Freud then, and possibly was also introduced to him by one of the founder members of the Wednesday Psychological Society, Max Kahane, who also worked there.

In 1890 Stekel completed the first six months of required military training, which he described as "the most disagreeable period of my life." No doubt in part because of this experience, in 1891 Stekel attended the International Pacifist Convention in Bern, funded by the well-known peace activist Berta von Suttner, and founded a University Pacifists Club supported not only by von Suttner, but also by Krafft-Ebing.

Nevertheless, he was in such financial straits that at the instigation of his family he applied for a military scholarship. This bound him to another six years of service in the army, and also prohibited him from marrying until his release in 1897. He managed, however, by intentionally failing an examination and using a loophole in the regulations, to gain his release in 1894.

Thereafter Stekel opened a successful doctor's practice, while as a sideline, following the example of his elder brother, the journalist Moritz Stekel, wrote articles and pamphlets covering issues around health and disease. In 1895 Stekel wrote an article, "Coitus in Childhood" which Freud cited in an article on "The Aetiology of Hysteria" in 1896. The same year Stekel cited Freud in an article on migraine, which, however, did not appear until 1897.

== Career ==
Stekel wrote a book called Auto-erotism: A Psychiatric Study of Onanism and Neurosis, first published in English in 1950. He is also credited with coining the term paraphilia to replace perversion. He analysed, among others, the psychoanalysts Otto Gross and A. S. Neill, as well as Freud's first biographer, Fritz Wittels. In his 1924 Freud biography, Wittels expressed his admiration for Stekel, to whose school he at that time adhered. This annoyed Freud who wrote in the margin of the copy of the book Wittels sent him 'Zu viel Stekel,' (Too much Stekel). Much later, Wittels, who by then had returned to the Freudian fold, still praised Stekel's "strange ease in understanding" but commented, "The trouble with Stekel's analysis was that it almost invariably reached an impasse when the so-called negative transference grew stronger". Stekel's autobiography was published posthumously in English in 1950.

== Contributions to psychoanalytic theory ==
=== Theory of neurosis ===
Stekel made significant contributions to symbolism in dreams, "as successive editions of The Interpretation of Dreams attest, with their explicit acknowledgement of Freud's debt to Stekel": "the works of Wilhelm Stekel and others...since taught me to form a truer estimate of the extent and importance of symbolism in dreams".

Considering obsessional doubts, Stekel said,

In anxiety the libido is transformed into organic and somatic symptoms; in doubt, the libido is transformed into intellectual symptoms. The more intellectual someone is, the greater will be the doubt component of the transformed forces. Doubt becomes pleasure sublimated as intellectual achievement.

Stekel wrote one of a set of three early "Psychoanalytic studies of psychical impotence" referred to approvingly by Freud: "Freud had written a preface to Stekel's book". Related to this may be Stekel's "elaboration of the idea that everyone, and in particular neurotics, has a peculiar form of sexual gratification which is alone adequate".

Freud credited Stekel as a potential forerunner when pondering the possibility that (for obsessional neurotics) "in the order of development hate is the precursor of love. This is perhaps the meaning of an assertion by Stekel (1911 [Die Sprache des Traumes], 536), which at the time I found incomprehensible, to the effect that hate and not love is the primary emotional relation between men". The same work is credited by Otto Fenichel as establishing 'the symbolic significance of right and left...right meaning correct and left meaning wrong '. Less flatteringly, Fenichel also associated it with "a comparatively large school of pseudo analysis which held that the patient should be 'bombarded' with 'deep interpretations,'" a backhanded tribute to the extent of Stekel's early following in the wake of his break with Freud.

=== Contributions to the theory of fetishism and of perversion ===
Stekel contrasted what he called "normal fetishes" from extreme interests: "They become pathological only when they have pushed the whole love object into the background and themselves appropriate the function of a love object, e.g., when a lover satisfies himself with the possession of a woman's shoe and considers the woman herself as secondary or even disturbing and superfluous" (p. 3). Stekel also deals differently than Freud with the problem of perversion. A lot of perversions are defense mechanisms (Schutzbauten) of the moral "self"; they represent hidden forms of asceticism. To Freud, the primal sexual venting meant health, while neuroses were created because of repressing sexual drives. Stekel, on the other hand, points out the significance of the repressed religious "self" in neuroses and indicates that apart from the repressed sexuality type, there is also a repressed morality type. This type is created in the conditions of sexual licentiousness while being opposed to doing it at the same time. In the latter instance, 'Stekel holds that fetichism is the patient's unconscious religion'. "Normal" fetishes for Stekel contributed more broadly to choice of lifestyle: thus "choice of vocation was actually an attempt to solve mental conflicts through the displacement of them", so that doctors for Stekel were "voyeurs who have transferred their original sexual current into the art of diagnosis".

Complaining of Freud's tendency to indiscretion, Ernest Jones wrote that he had told him "the nature of Stekel's sexual perversion, which he should not have and which I have never repeated to anyone". Stekel's "elaboration of the idea that everyone, and in particular every neurotic, has a peculiar form of sexual gratification which is alone adequate" may thus have been grounded in personal experience.

On sado-masochism, "Stekel has described the essence of the sadomasochistic act to be humiliation".

=== Freud's critique of Stekel's theory of the origin of phobias ===
In The Ego and the Id, Freud wrote of the "high-sounding phrase, 'every fear is ultimately the fear of death'"—associated with Stekel (1908)—that it "has hardly any meaning, and at any rate cannot be justified", evidence perhaps (as with psychic impotence and love/hate) of his continuing engagement with the thought of his former associate.

=== On technique ===
Stekel "was also an innovator in technique...devis[ing] a form of short-term therapy called active analysis which has much in common with some modern form of counselling and therapy".

=== On aesthetics ===
Stekel maintained that "in every child there slumbered a creative artist". In connection with the psychoanalytic examination of the roots of art, however, he emphasised that "...the Freudian interpretation, no matter how far it be carried, never offers even the rudest criterion of 'artistic' excellence...we are investigating only the impulse which drives people to create". Analyzing the dreams of artists and non-artists alike, Stekel pointed out that "at the level of symbol production the poet does not differ from the most prosaic soul...Is it not remarkable that the great poet Goethe and the unknown little woman...should have constructed such similar dreams?".

== Personal life ==
Stekel was married twice and had two children. Stekel committed suicide in Kensington by taking an overdose of Aspirin "to end the pain of his prostate and the diabetic gangrene". He died at 34–37 Pembridge Gardens, Kensington, London W2, leaving a modest estate valued at £2,430. His remains were cremated at Golders Green Crematorium on 29 June 1940. His ashes lie in section 3-V of the Garden of Remembrance but there is no memorial.

Stekel's autobiography was published posthumously, edited by his former personal assistant Emil Gutheil and his wife Hilda Binder Stekel. His widow died in 1969.

A biographical account of Stekel's life appeared in The Self-Marginalization of Wilhelm Stekel (2007) by Jaap Bos and Leendert Groenendijk, which also includes his correspondence with Sigmund Freud. See also L. Mecacci, Freudian Slips: The Casualties of Psychoanalysis from the Wolf Man to Marilyn Monroe, Vagabond Voices 2009, pp. 101

== In popular culture ==
- He is referenced in the episodes 22 and 26 of Ghost in the Shell: Stand Alone Complex.
- A quote attributed to Stekel ("The mark of the immature man is that he wants to die nobly for a cause. The mark of the mature man is that he wants to live humbly for one.") is referenced in The Catcher in the Rye by J.D. Salinger. Cited by a character in the novel as a statement of Stekel's, it has sometimes been attributed to Salinger and may indeed be his paraphrase of a statement by the German writer Otto Ludwig (1813–1865), which Stekel himself has quoted in his writings: "Das Höchste, wozu er sich erheben konnte, war, für etwas rühmlich zu sterben; jetzt erhebt er sich zu dem Größern, für etwas ruhmlos zu leben." Cf. q:Wilhelm Stekel#Misattributed.
- A quote from Stekel's Sadism and Masochism: The Psychology of Hatred and Cruelty. is used by British extreme metal band Carcass in the booklet of the album Necroticism - Descanting the Insalubrious (1991).

== Selected publications ==
- Stekel W. (1908) Nervöse Angstzustände und ihre Behandlung. Fourth Edition. Urban & Schwarzenberg.
- Stekel W. (1911). Die Sprache des Traumes: Eine Darstellung der Symbolik und Deutung des Traumes in ihren Bezeihungen
- Stekel W. (1911). Sexual Root of Kleptomania. J. Am. Inst. Crim. L. & Criminology
- Stekel W. (1917). Nietzsche und Wagner, eine sexualpsychologische Studie zur Psychogenese des Freundschaftsgefühles und des Freundschaftsverrates
- Stekel W. (1921). The beloved ego, foundations of the new study of the psyche
- Stekel W. (1921) The depths of the soul; psycho-analytical studies
- Stekel W. (1922). Compulsion and Doubt (Zwang und Zweifel) Liveright
- Stekel W. (1922). Disguises of love; psycho-analytical sketches
- Stekel W. (1922). The Homosexual Neuroses
- Stekel W. (1922). Bi-sexual love; the homosexual neurosis (2003 reprint: Bisexual Love. Fredonia)
- Stekel W. (1922). Sex and dreams; the language of dreams
- Stekel W. (1923) Conditions of Nervous Anxiety and Their Treatment, Tr. Rosalie Gabler, Dood, Mead & Co. Reprinted (2014) by Routledge
- Stekel W. (1926). Frigidity in women Vol. II. Grove Press
- Stekel W., Boltz O.H. (1927). Impotence in the Male: The Psychic Disorders of Sexual Function in the Male. Boni and Liveright
- Stekel W., Van Teslaar J.S. (1929). Peculiarities of Behavior: Wandering Mania, Dipsomania, Cleptomania, Pyromania and Allied Impulsive Disorders. H. Liveright
- Stekel W. (1929). Sadism and Masochism: The Psychology of Hatred and Cruelty. Liveright
- Stekel W. (1943). The Interpretation of Dreams: New Developments and Technique. Liveright
- Stekel W., Gutheil E. (1950). The Autobiography of Wilhelm Stekel. Liveright
- Stekel W., Boltz O.H. (1950). Technique of Analytical Psychotherapy. Liveright
- Stekel W. (1952). Disorders of the Instincts and the Emotions -- The Parapathaic Disorders, Vol. 1 and Sexual Aberrations -- The Phenomena of Fetishism in Relation to Sex, Volume 2. (Two volumes in one.) Liveright
- Stekel W. (1952). Patterns of Psychosexual Infantilism Grove Press Books and Evergreen Books
- Stekel W. (1961). Auto-erotism: a psychiatric study of masturbation and neurosis. Grove Press

== See also ==
- Rosalie Gabler translated several books by Stekel into English
