= Ipjeong-dong =

Neighborhood in Seoul, South Korea

- Interactive map of Ipjeong-dong
- Country: South Korea

Area
  - Total: 0.04 km^{2} (0.015 sq mi)

Korean name
- Hangul: 입정동
- Hanja: 笠井洞
- RR: Ipjeong-dong
- MR: Ipchŏng-dong

Ipjeong-dong (Korean: 입정동) is a legal dong (neighborhood) of Jung District, Seoul, South Korea. It is governed by its administrative dong, Euljiro 3, 4, 5ga-dong.

== See also ==
- Administrative divisions of South Korea
