= Louis Daguerre =

French scientist, artist and photographer (1787–1851)

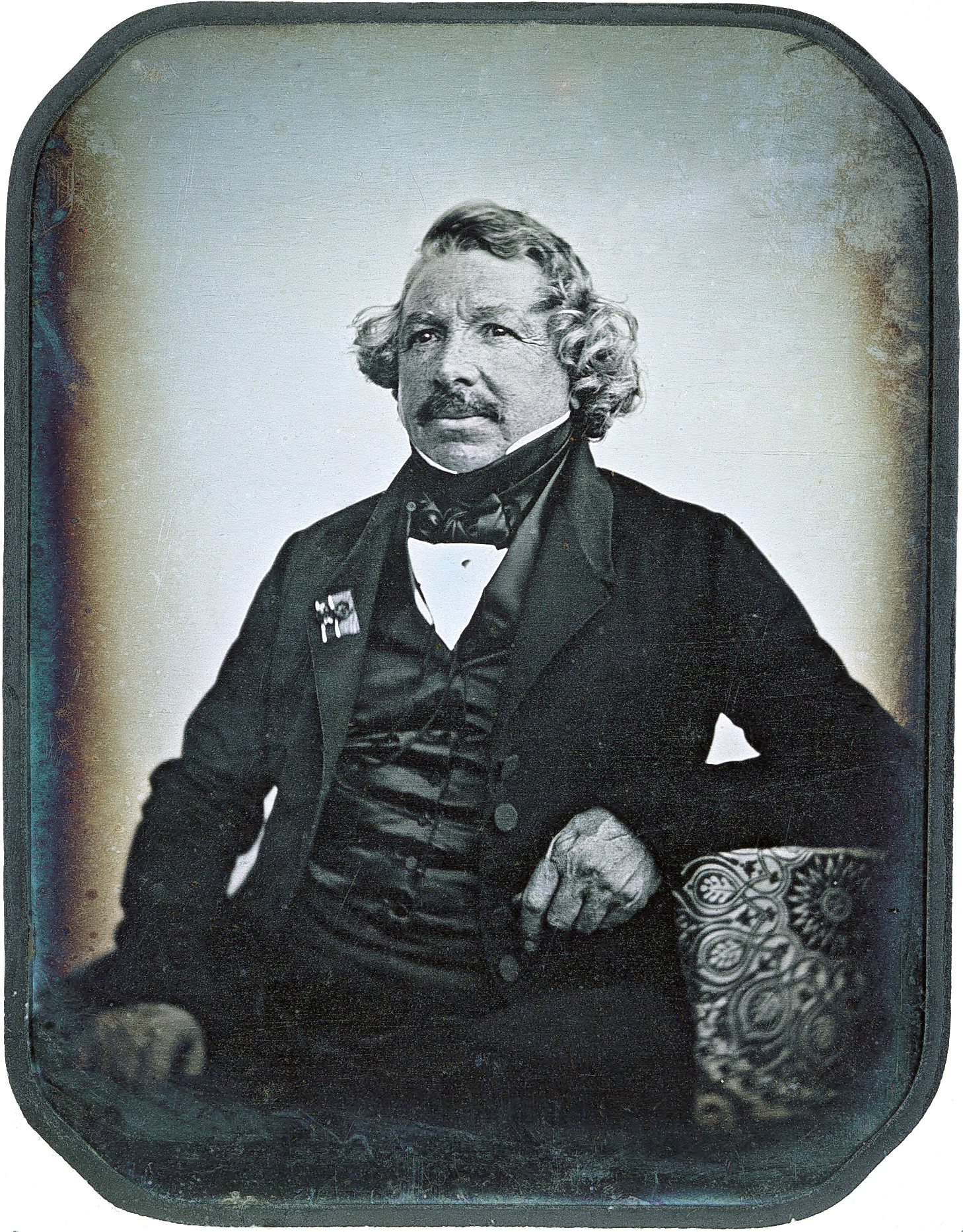
- 1844 daguerreotype (Note: Note that the image is reversed laterally, as was common for daguerreotypes)
- Born: Louis-Jacques-Mandé Daguerre; 18 November 1787; Cormeilles-en-Parisis, France
- Died: 10 July 1851 (aged 63); Bry-sur-Marne, France
- Occupations: Scientist; photographer
- Years active: 1822–1851
- Known for: Invention of the daguerreotype process
- Spouse: Louise Georgina Arrow-Smith (m. 1810)

Louis-Jacques-Mandé Daguerre (/dəˈɡɛər/ də-GAIR; French: [lwi ʒɑk mɑ̃de daɡɛʁ]; 18 November 1787 – 10 July 1851) was a French scientist, artist and photographer. He is recognized for his invention of the eponymous daguerreotype process of photography. He became known as one of the fathers of photography. Though he is most famous for his contributions to photography, he was also an accomplished painter, scenic designer, and a developer of the diorama theatre.

== Biography ==
Louis Daguerre was born in Cormeilles-en-Parisis, Val-d'Oise. He was apprenticed in architecture, theatre design, and panoramic painting to Pierre Prévost, the first French panorama painter. Exceedingly adept at his skill of theatrical illusion, he became a celebrated designer for the theatre, and later came to invent the diorama, which opened in Paris in July 1822.

In 1829, Daguerre partnered with Nicéphore Niépce, an inventor who had produced the world's first heliograph in 1822 and the oldest surviving camera photograph in 1826 or 1827. Niépce died suddenly in 1833, but Daguerre continued experimenting, and evolved the process which would subsequently be known as the daguerreotype. After efforts to interest private investors proved fruitless, Daguerre went public with his invention in 1839. At a joint meeting of the French Academy of Sciences and the Académie des Beaux Arts on 7 January of that year, the invention was announced and described in general terms, but all specific details were withheld. Under assurances of strict confidentiality, Daguerre explained and demonstrated the process only to the Academy's perpetual secretary François Arago, who proved to be an invaluable advocate. Members of the Academy and other select individuals were allowed to examine specimens at Daguerre's studio. The images were enthusiastically praised as nearly miraculous, and news of the daguerreotype quickly spread. Arrangements were made for Daguerre's rights to be acquired by the French Government in exchange for lifetime pensions for himself and Niépce's son Isidore; then, on 19 August 1839, the French Government presented the invention as a gift from France "free to the world", and complete working instructions were published. In 1839, he was elected to the National Academy of Design as an Honorary Academician.

Daguerre died, from a heart attack, on 10 July 1851 in Bry-sur-Marne, 12 km (7 mi) from Paris. A monument marks his grave there.

Daguerre's name is one of the 72 names inscribed on the Eiffel tower.

== Development of the daguerreotype ==
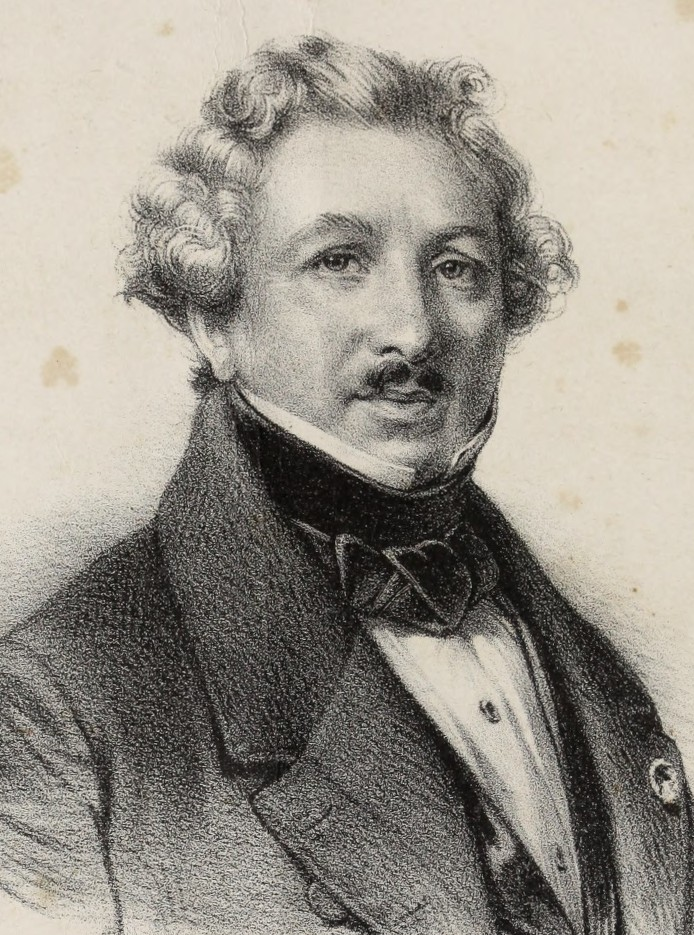
An engraving of Daguerre during his career

In the mid-1820s, prior to his association with Daguerre, Niépce used a coating of bitumen of Judea to make the first permanent camera photographs. The bitumen was hardened where it was exposed to light and the unhardened portion was then removed with a solvent. A camera exposure lasting for hours or days was required. Niépce and Daguerre later refined this process, but unacceptably long exposures were still needed.

After the death of Niépce in 1833, Daguerre concentrated his attention on the light-sensitive properties of silver salts, which had previously been demonstrated by Johann Heinrich Schultz and others. For the process which was eventually named the daguerreotype, he exposed a thin silver-plated copper sheet to the vapour given off by iodine crystals, producing a coating of light-sensitive silver iodide on the surface. The plate was then exposed in the camera. Initially, this process, too, required a very long exposure to produce a distinct image, but Daguerre made the crucial discovery that an invisibly faint "latent" image created by a much shorter exposure could be chemically "developed" into a visible image. Upon seeing the image, the contents of which are unknown, Daguerre said, "I have seized the light – I have arrested its flight!"

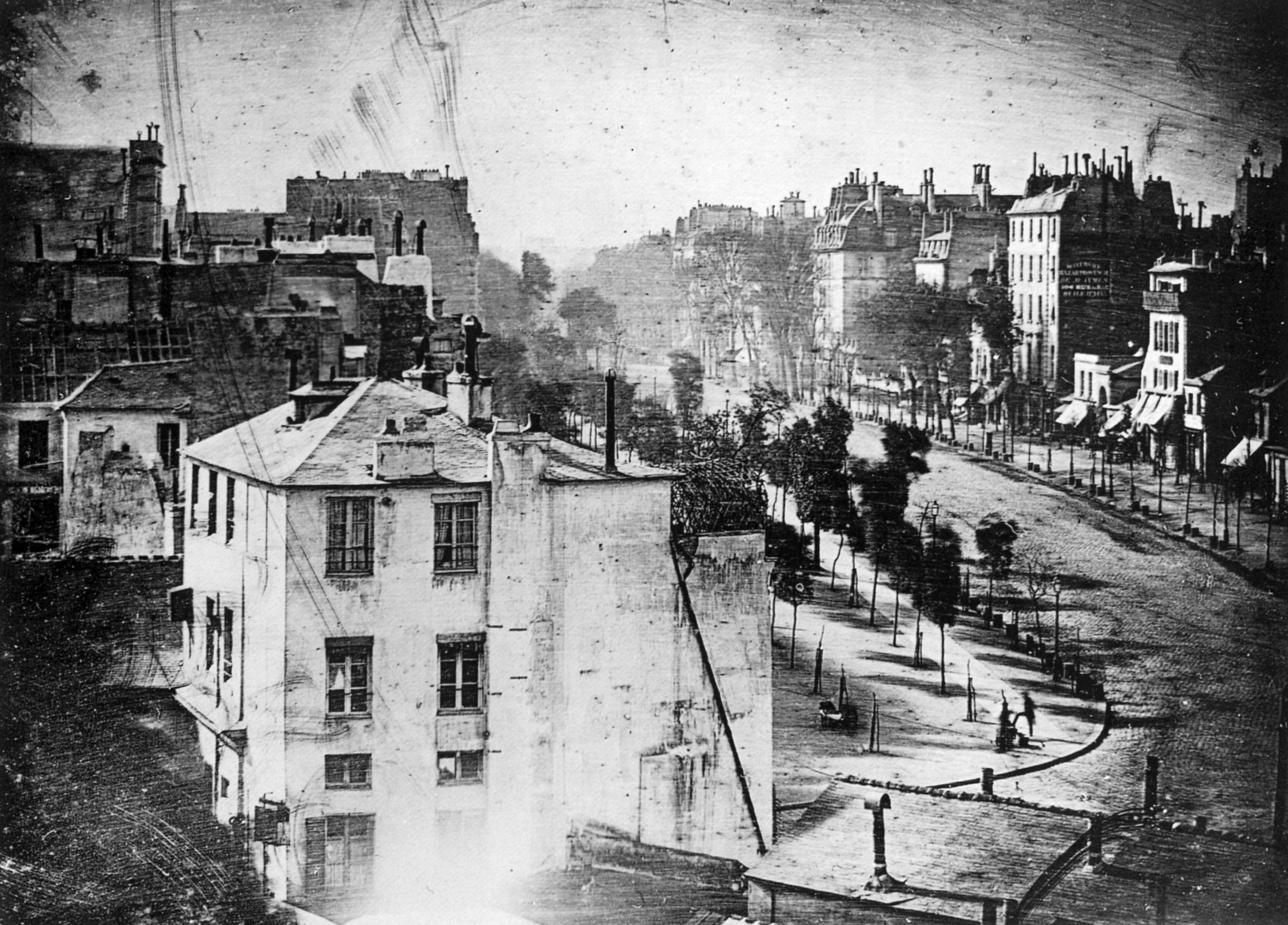
View of the Boulevard du Temple, taken by Daguerre in 1838 in Paris, includes the earliest known verified photograph of a person. The image shows a busy street, but because the exposure had to continue for four to five minutes the moving traffic is not visible. At the lower right, however, a man apparently having his boots polished, and the bootblack polishing them, were motionless enough for their images to be captured.

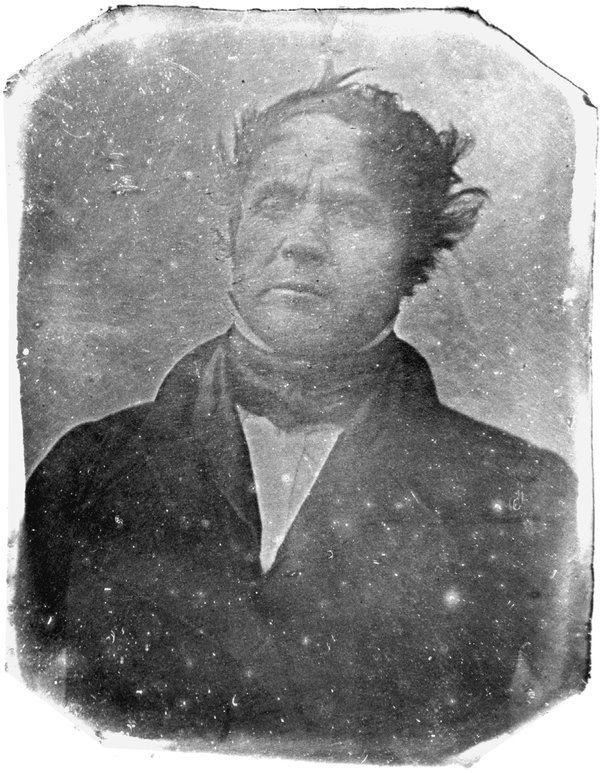
Daguerreotype possibly made by Daguerre in 1837. The subject is believed to be Constant Huet, who worked at the Natural History Museum, where Daguerre took pictures in 1837. If correct, this would be the oldest surviving portrait photograph of a human being.

The latent image on a daguerreotype plate was developed by subjecting it to the vapour given off by mercury heated to 75 °C. The resulting visible image was then "fixed" (made insensitive to further exposure to light) by removing the unaffected silver iodide with concentrated and heated salt water. Later, a solution of the more effective "hypo" (hyposulphite of soda, now known as sodium thiosulfate) was used instead.

The resultant plate produced an exact reproduction of the scene. The image was laterally reversed—as images in mirrors are—unless a mirror or inverting prism was used during exposure to flip the image. To be seen optimally, the image had to be lit at a certain angle and viewed so that the smooth parts of its mirror-like surface, which represented the darkest parts of the image, reflected something dark or dimly lit. The surface was subject to tarnishing by prolonged exposure to the air and was so soft that it could be marred by the slightest friction, so a daguerreotype was almost always sealed under glass before being framed (as was commonly done in France) or mounted in a small folding case (as was normal in the UK and US).

Daguerreotypes were usually portraits; the rarer landscape views and other unusual subjects are now much sought after by collectors and sell for much higher prices than ordinary portraits. At the time of its introduction, the process required exposures lasting ten minutes or more for brightly sunlit subjects, so portraiture was an impractical ordeal. Samuel Morse was astonished to learn that daguerreotypes of the streets of Paris did not show any people, horses or vehicles, until he realized that due to the long exposure times all moving objects became invisible. Within a few years, exposures had been reduced to as little as a few seconds by the use of additional sensitizing chemicals and "faster" lenses such as Petzval's portrait lens, the first mathematically calculated lens.

The daguerreotype was the Polaroid film of its day: it produced a unique image which could only be duplicated by using a camera to photograph the original. Despite this drawback, millions of daguerreotypes were produced. The paper-based calotype process, introduced by Henry Fox Talbot in 1841, allowed the production of an unlimited number of copies by simple contact printing, but it had its own shortcomings—the grain of the paper was obtrusively visible in the image, and the extremely fine detail of which the daguerreotype was capable was not possible. The introduction of the wet collodion process in the early 1850s provided the basis for a negative-positive print-making process not subject to these limitations, although it, like the daguerreotype, was initially used to produce one-of-a-kind images—ambrotypes on glass and tintypes on black-lacquered iron sheets—rather than prints on paper. These new types of images were much less expensive than daguerreotypes, and they were easier to view. By 1860 few photographers were still using Daguerre's process.

The same small ornate cases commonly used to house daguerreotypes were also used for images produced by the later and very different ambrotype and tintype processes, and the images originally in them were sometimes later discarded so that they could be used to display photographic paper prints. It is now a very common error for any image in such a case to be described as "a daguerreotype". A true daguerreotype is always an image on a highly polished silver surface, usually under protective glass. If it is viewed while a brightly lit sheet of white paper is held so as to be seen reflected in its mirror-like metal surface, the daguerreotype image will appear as a relatively faint negative—its dark and light areas reversed—instead of a normal positive. Other types of photographic images are almost never on polished metal and do not exhibit this peculiar characteristic of appearing positive or negative depending on the lighting and reflections.

== Competition with Talbot ==
Unbeknownst to either inventor, Daguerre's developmental work in the mid-1830s coincided with photographic experiments being conducted by William Henry Fox Talbot in England. Talbot had succeeded in producing a "sensitive paper" impregnated with silver chloride and capturing small camera images on it in the summer of 1835, though he did not publicly reveal this until January 1839. Talbot was unaware that Daguerre's late partner Niépce had obtained similar small camera images on silver-chloride-coated paper nearly twenty years earlier. Niépce could find no way to keep them from darkening all over when exposed to light for viewing and had therefore turned away from silver salts to experiment with other substances such as bitumen. Talbot chemically stabilized his images to withstand subsequent inspection in daylight by treating them with a strong solution of common salt.

When the first reports of the French Academy of Sciences announcement of Daguerre's invention reached Talbot, with no details about the exact nature of the images or the process itself, he assumed that methods similar to his own must have been used, and promptly wrote an open letter to the Academy claiming priority of invention. Although it soon became apparent that Daguerre's process was very unlike his own, Talbot had been stimulated to resume his long-discontinued photographic experiments. The developed out daguerreotype process only required an exposure sufficient to create a very faint or completely invisible latent image which was then chemically developed to full visibility. Talbot's earlier "sensitive paper" (now known as "salted paper") process was a printed out process that required prolonged exposure in the camera until the image was fully formed, but his later calotype (also known as talbotype) paper negative process, introduced in 1841, also used latent image development, greatly reducing the exposure needed, and making it competitive with the daguerreotype.

Daguerre's agent Miles Berry applied for a British patent under the instruction of Daguerre just days before France declared the invention "free to the world". The United Kingdom was thereby uniquely denied France's free gift, and became the only country where the payment of license fees was required. This had the effect of inhibiting the spread of the process there, to the eventual advantage of competing processes which were subsequently introduced into England. Antoine Claudet was one of the few people legally licensed to make daguerreotypes in Britain.

== Diorama theatres ==
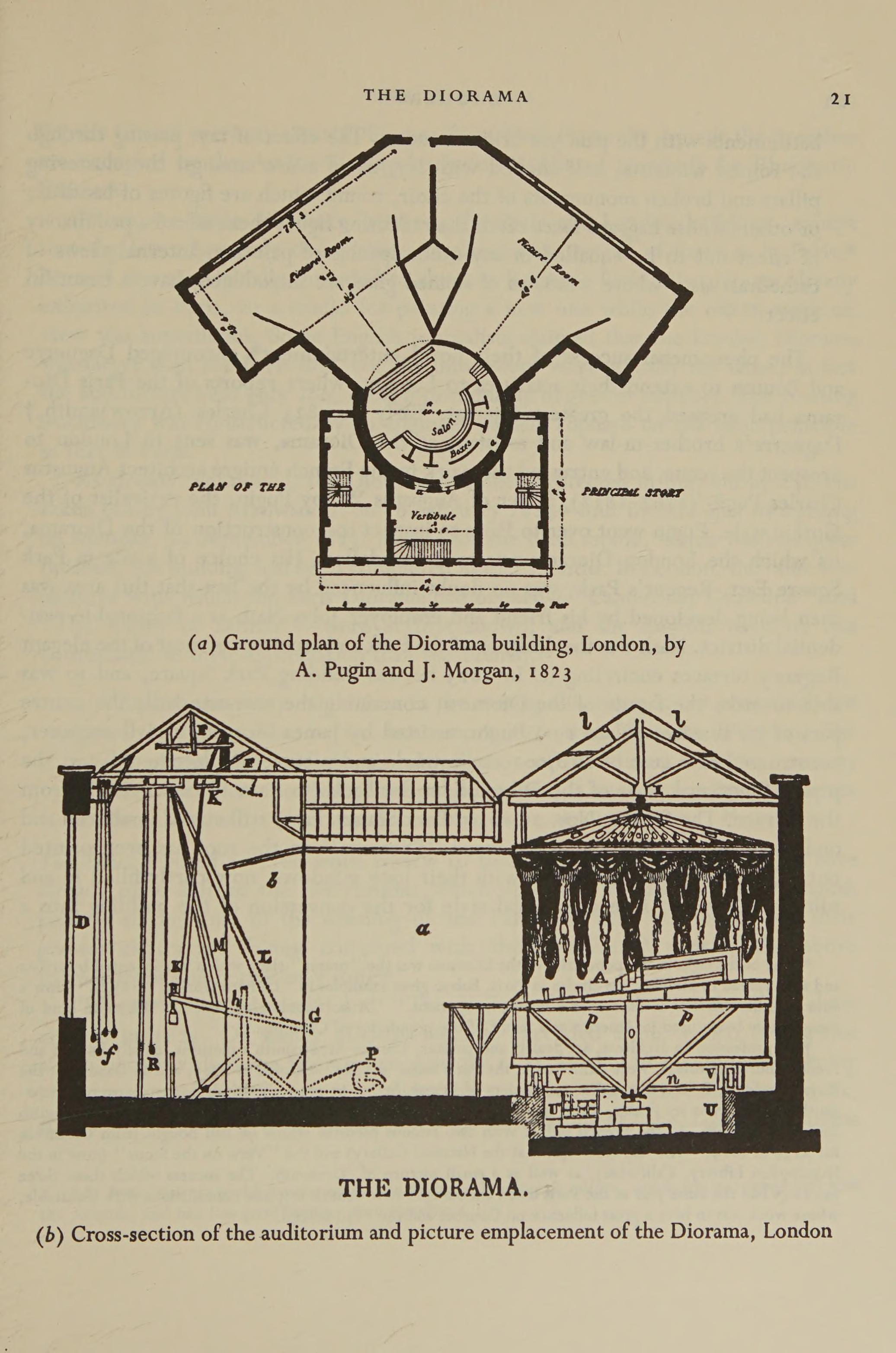
Diagram of the London diorama building

In the spring of 1821, Daguerre partnered with Charles Marie Bouton with the common goal of creating a diorama theatre. Daguerre had expertise in lighting and scenic effects, and Bouton was the more experienced painter. However, Bouton eventually withdrew, and Daguerre acquired sole responsibility of the diorama theatre.

The first diorama theatre was built in the Place du Château d'Eau (now the Place de la République) in Paris. The first exhibit opened 1822 and showed scenes of the Black Forest, the Inauguration of the Temple of Solomon and the Great Fire of Edinburgh. It showed two tableaux, one by Daguerre and one by Bouton. This would become a pattern. Each exhibition would typically have two tableaux, one each by Daguerre and Bouton. Also, one would be an interior depiction, and the other would be a landscape. Daguerre hoped to create a realistic illusion for an audience, and wanted audiences to be not only entertained, but awe-stricken. The diorama theatres were magnificent in size. A large translucent canvas, measuring around 70 ft wide and 45 ft tall, was painted on both sides. These paintings were vivid and detailed pictures, and were lit from different angles. As the lights changed, the scene would transform. The audience would begin to see the painting on the other side of the screen. The effect was awe-inspiring. "Transforming impressions, mood changes, and movements were produced by a system of shutters and screens that allowed light to be projected- from behind- on alternately separate sections of an image painted on a semi-transparent backdrop".

Because of their size, the screens had to remain stationary. Since the tableaux were stationary, the auditorium revolved from one scene to another. The auditorium was a cylindrical room and had a single opening in the wall, similar to a proscenium arch, through which the audience could watch a "scene". Audiences would average around 350, and most would stand, though limited seating was provided. Twenty-one diorama paintings were exhibited in the first eight years. These included 'Trinity Chapel in Canterbury Cathedral', 'Chartres Cathedral', 'City of Rouen', and 'Environs of Paris' by Bouton; 'Valley of Sarnen', 'Harbour of Brest', 'Holyroodhouse Chapel', and 'Roslin Chapel' by Daguerre.

The Roslin Chapel was known for a few legends involving an unconsuming fire. The legend goes that the Chapel has appeared to be in flames just before a high-status death, but has later shown no damage from any such fire. This chapel was also known for being unique in its architectural beauty. Daguerre was aware of both of these aspects of Roslin Chapel, and this made it a perfect subject for his diorama painting. The legends connected with the chapel would be sure to attract a large audience. Interior of Roslin Chapel in Paris opened 24 September 1824 and closed February 1825. The scene depicted light coming in through a door and a window. Foliage shadows could be seen at the window, and the way the light's rays shone through the leaves was breathtaking and seemed to "go beyond the power of painting" (Maggi). Then the light faded on the scene as if a cloud was passing over the sun. The Times dedicated an article to the exhibition, calling it "perfectly magical".

The dioramas prospered, earning 200,000 francs a year, a very high profit for the 1830s period. The surging demand led to new diorama theatres opening in London and Berlin. However, in 8 March 1839, a fire broke out in the theatre in Paris. Daguerre urged the firefighters to stop the blaze on the fifth floor, where all his daguerreotype specimens, notes, and equipment were kept. He was more interested in the development of daguerreotypes, and later in August 1839, his daguerreotype specimens were debuted. Later in the 1840s, along with increasing attention to motion photography and cinema, people lost interest in dioramas. The fire, along with the waning demand of dioramas caused a decline in the industry.

== Portraits of and works by Louis Daguerre ==
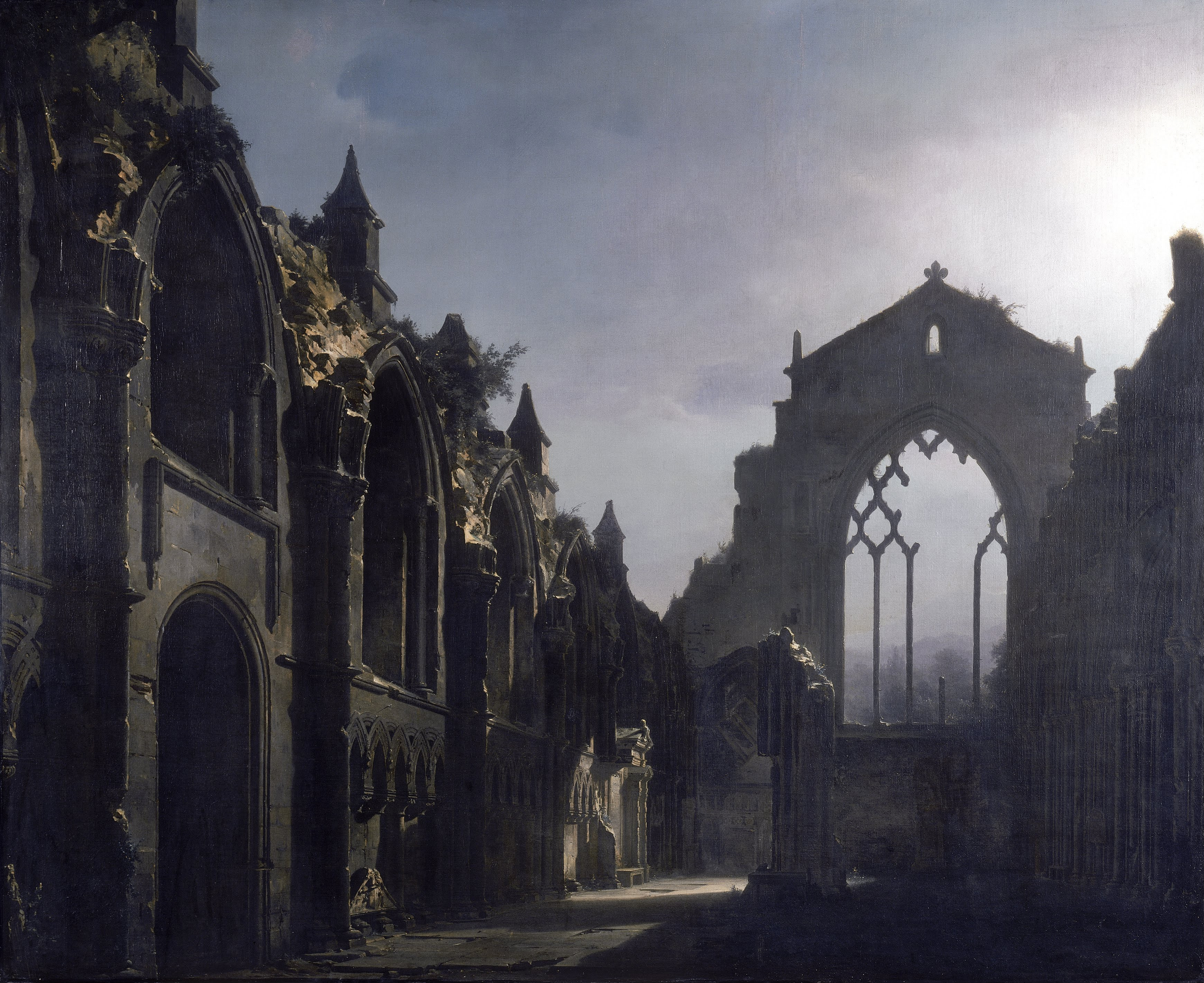
The Ruins of Holyrood Chapel, painting by Daguerre (1824)

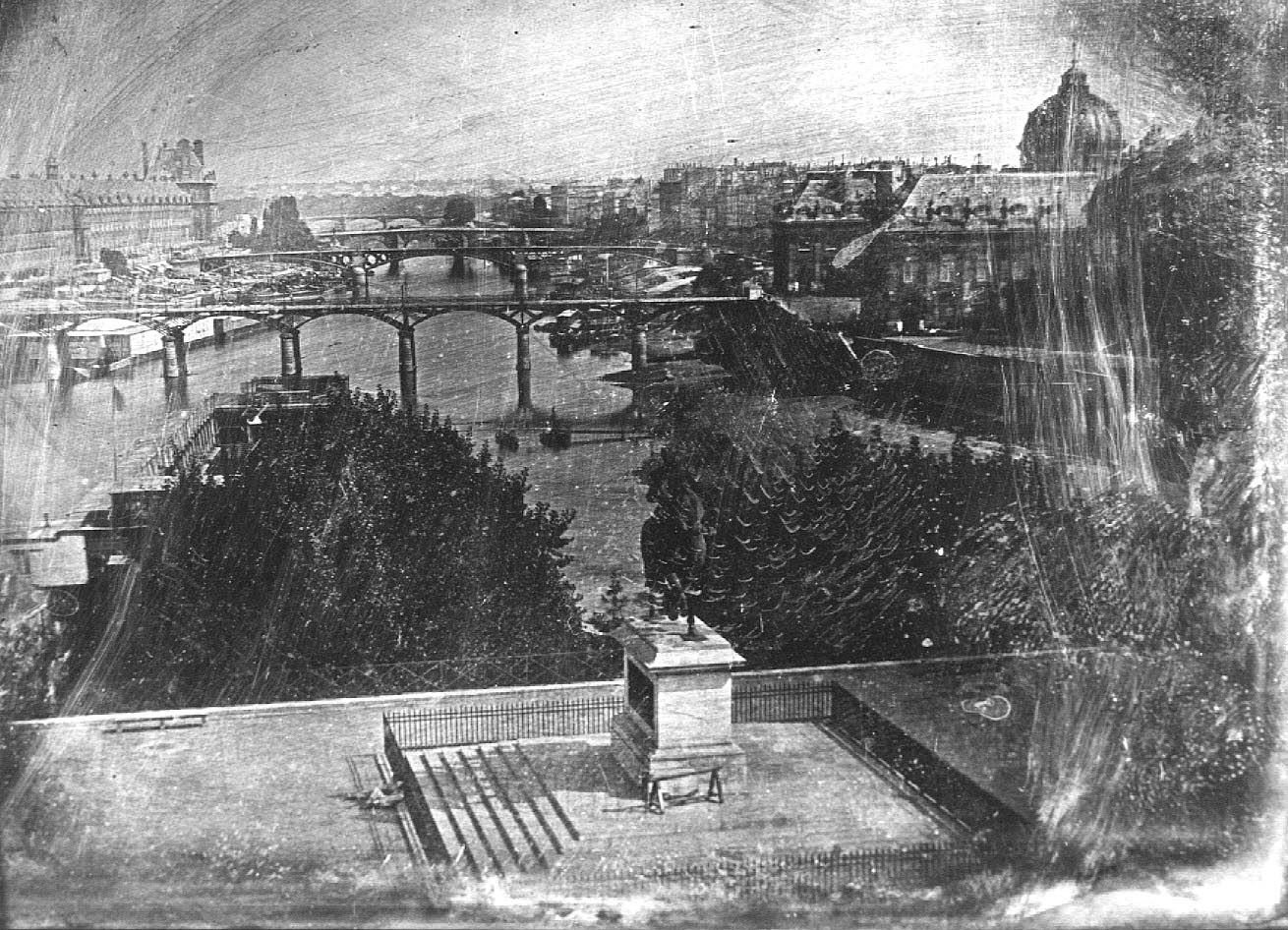
Daguerreotype of the Pont Neuf, 1836-39. Two people can be seen lying in the shade of the statue. Said to be the first successful daguerreotype taken in open air by Daguerre and Mathurin Fordos.

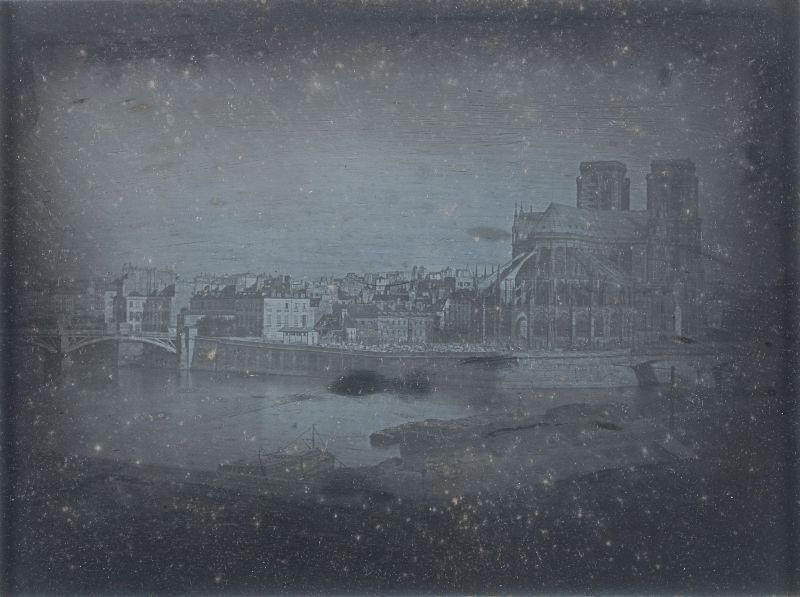
Daguerreotype of Notre Dame de Paris by Daguerre, c. 1838

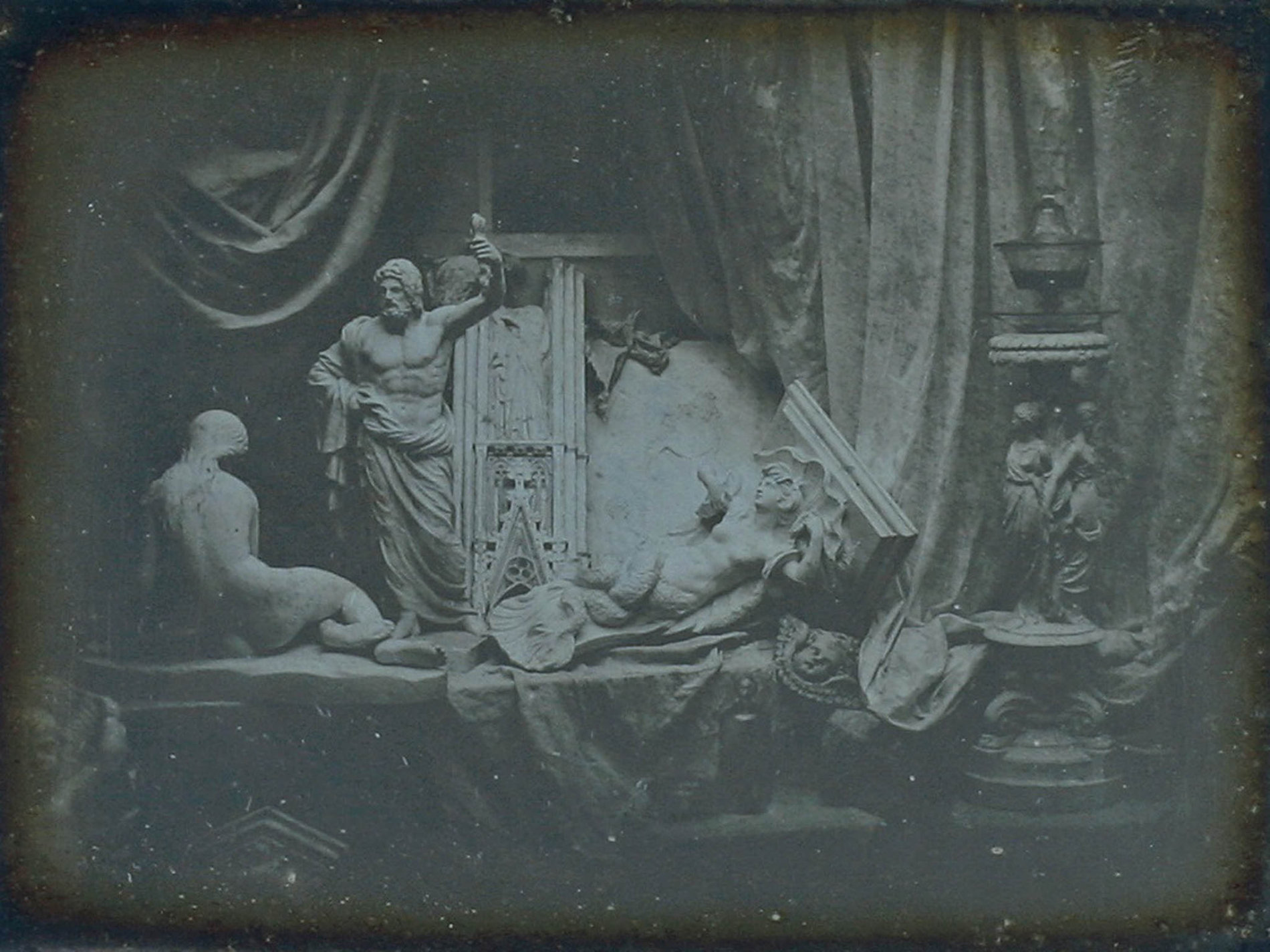
Still Life with Jupiter Tonans (1839)

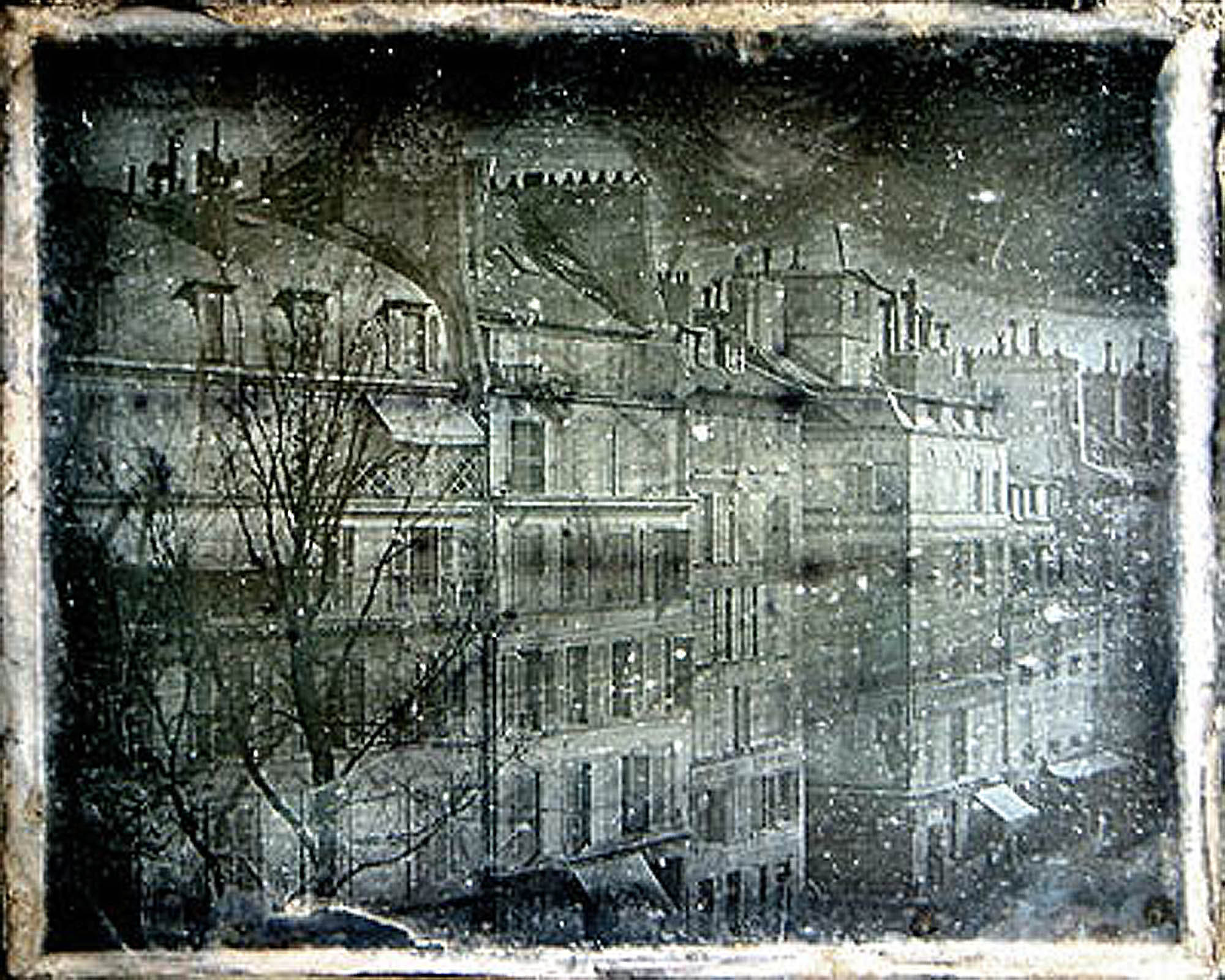
1839 daguerreotype made by Daguerre from his apartment at Boulevard Saint-Martin, where he lived after the diorama fire.

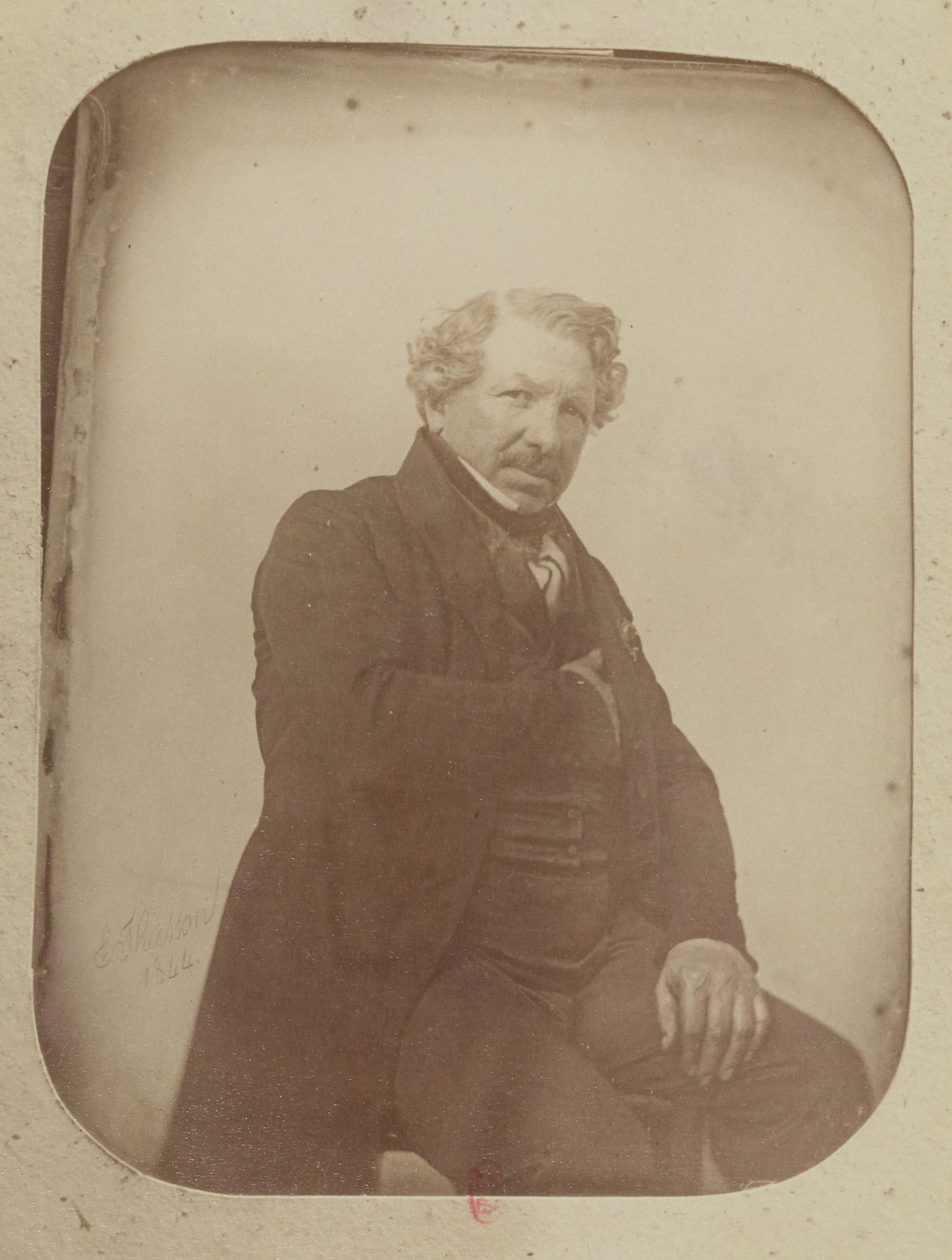
Portrait by E. Thiésson (1844)

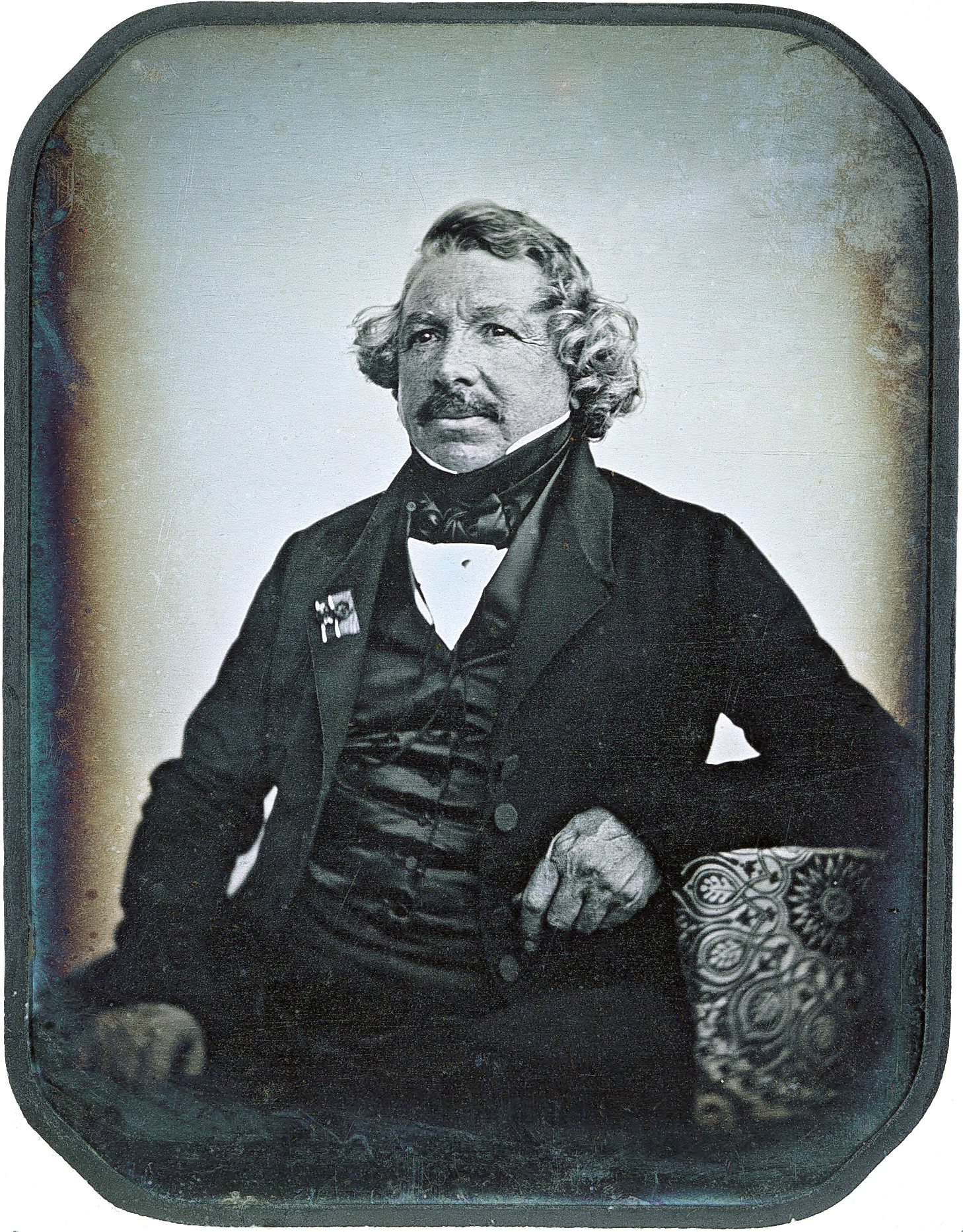
Portrait by Jean-Baptiste Sabatier-Blot (1844)

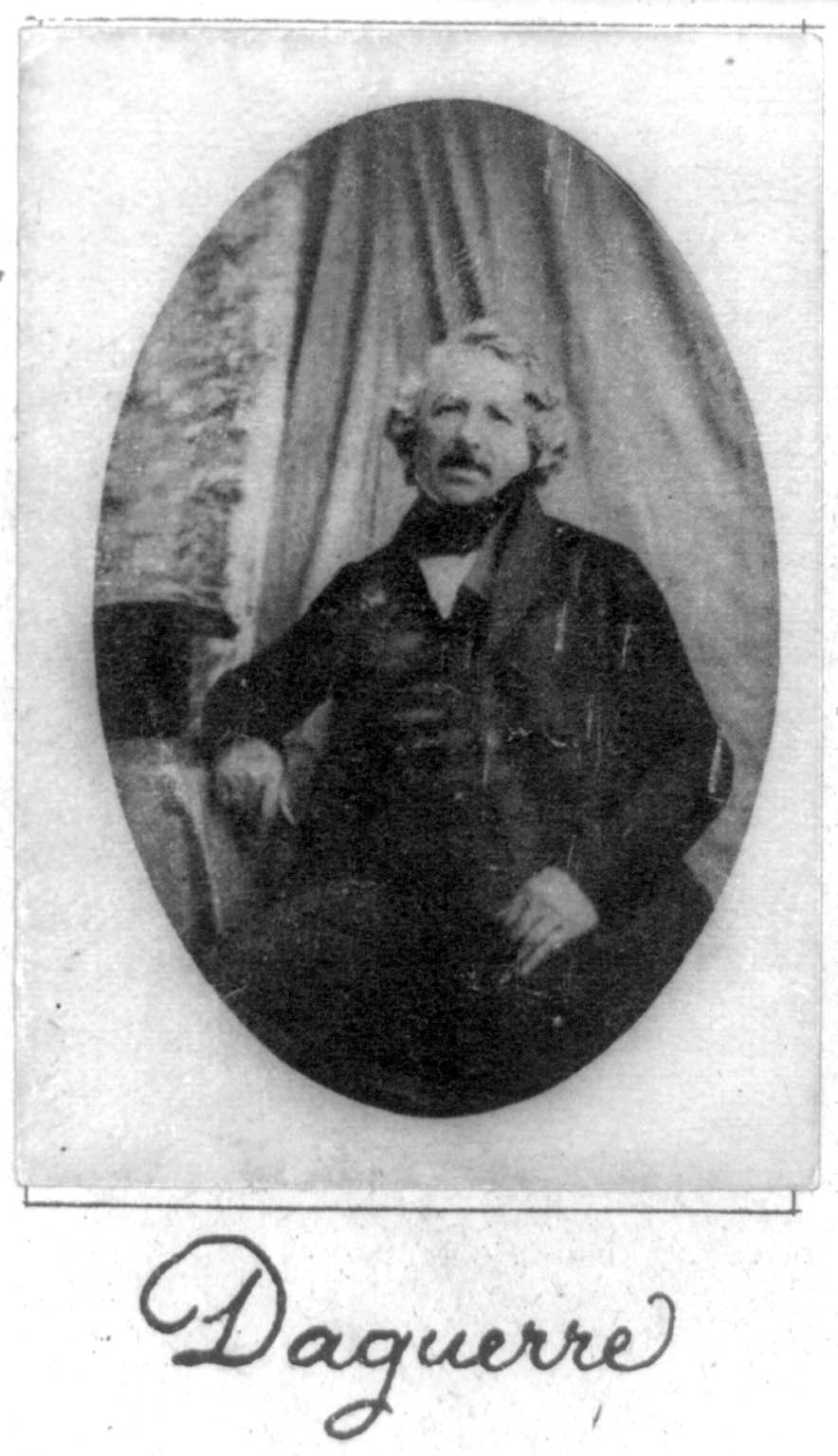
Portrait by unknown photographer (c. 1844)

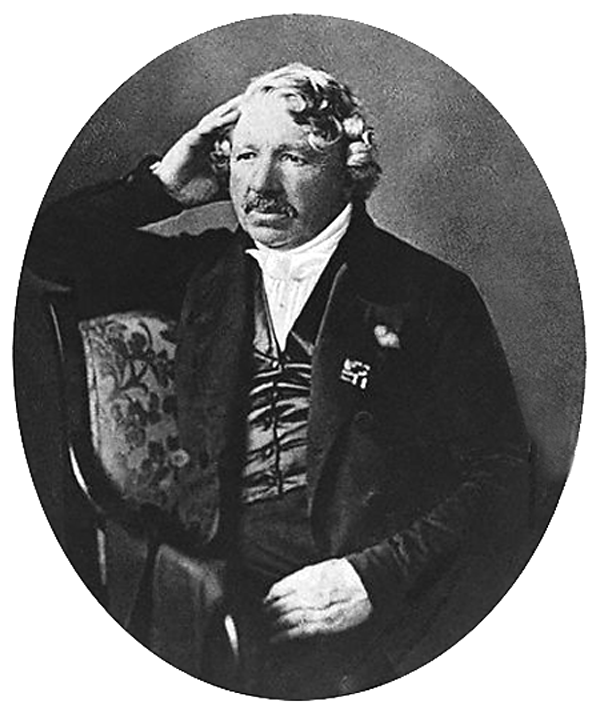
Portrait by Charles Meade (1848)

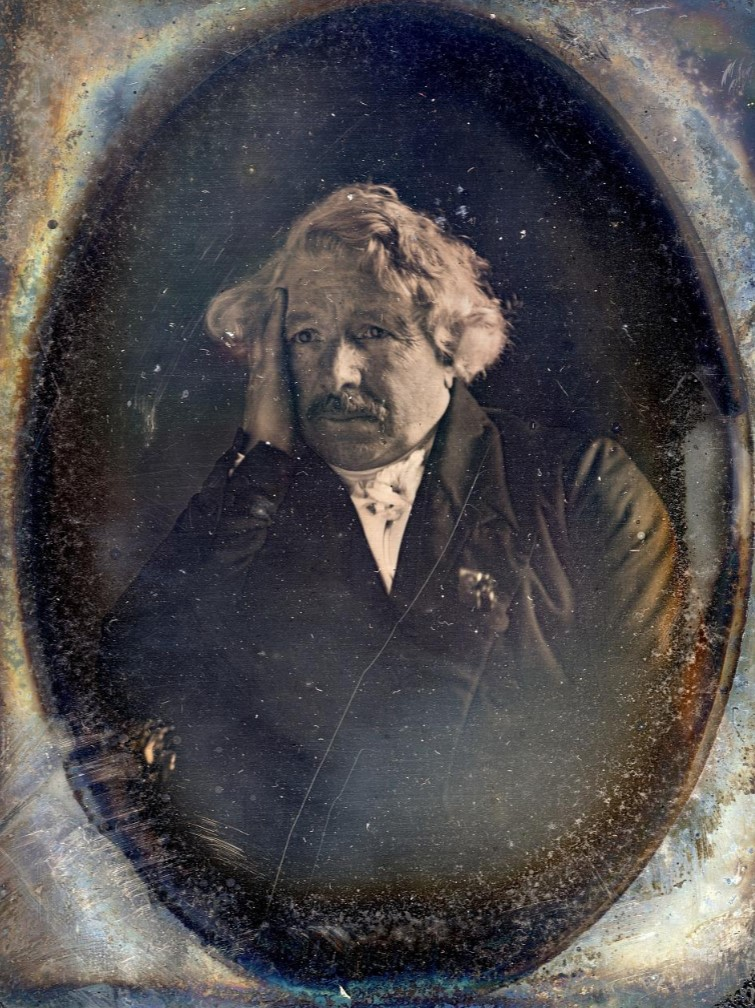
Portrait by Charles Meade (1848)

== See also ==
- John Herschel
- List of people considered father or mother of a field
- Palladiotype
- Photographic processes
- Platinotype
- William Willis
- Daguerreotype

== Sources ==
- Carl Edwin Lindgren. Teaching Photography in the Indian School. Photo Trade Directory: 1991. India International Photographic Council. Edited: N. Sundarraj and K. Ponnuswamy. VII IIPC-SIPATA Intl. Workshop and Conference on Photography – Madras, p. 9.
- R. Colson (ed.), "Mémoires originaux des créateurs de la photographie. Nicéphore Niepce, Daguerre, Bayard, Talbot, Niepce de Saint-Victor", Poitevin, Paris 1898
- Helmut and Alison Gernsheim, L.J.M. Daguerre. The History of the Diorama and the Daguerreotype, London 1956 (revised edition 1968)
- Beaumont Newhall, An Historical and Descriptive Account of the Various Processes of the Daguerreotype and the Diorama by Daguerre, New York, 1971
- Hans Rooseboom, "What's wrong with Daguerre? Reconsidering old and new views on the invention of photography", Nescio, Amsterdam, 2010 (www.nescioprivatepress.blogspot.com)
- Daguerre, Louis (1839). History and Practice of the Photogenic Drawing on the True Principles of the Daguerreotype with the New Method of Dioramic Painting. London: Stewart and Murray. "A practical description of that process called the daguerreotype."
- Daniel, Malcolm. "Daguerre (1787–1851) and the Invention of Photography". The Metropolitan Museum of Art, 2011. Web. 17 January 2012.
- Gale, Thomas. "Louis Jacques Mande Daguerre". BookRags, Inc., 2012. Web. 14 April 2012.
- Kahane, Henry. Comparative Literature Studies. 3rd ed. Vol. 12. Penn State UP, 1975. Print.
- Maggi, Angelo. "Roslin Chapel in Gandy's Sketchbook and Daguerre's Diorama". Architectural History. 1991 ed. Vol. 42. SAHGB Publications Limited, 1991. Print.
- Szalczer, Eszter. "Nature's Dream Play: Modes of Vision and August Strindberg's Re-Definition Of the Theatre". Theatre Journal. 1st ed. Vol. 53. Johns Hopkins UP, 2001. Print.
- "Classics of Science: The Daguerreotype". The Science News-Letter. 374th ed. Vol. 13. Society For Science & the Public, 1928. Print.
- Watson, Bruce, "Light: A Radiant History from Creation to the Quantum Age", (London and NY: Bloomsbury, 2016). Print.
- Wilkinson, Lynn R. "Le Cousin Pons and the Invention of Ideology". PMLA. 2nd ed. Vol. 107. Modern Language Association, 1992. Print.
- Wood, R. Derek. "The Diorama in Great Britain in the 1820s". Annals of Science, Sept 1997, Vol 54, No. 5, pp. 489–506 (Taylor & Francis Group). Web. (Midley History of early Photography) 14 April 2012
