= Peter Yu Tae-chol =

Korean saint

Saint Peter Yu Tae-chol 유대철 베드로

Martyr
- Born: c. 1826; Ipjeong, South Korea
- Died: October 31, 1839; Seoul, South Korea
- Venerated in: Roman Catholic Church
- Beatified: 6 June 1925 by Pope Pius XI
- Canonized: 6 May 1984 by Pope John Paul II
- Feast: October 21; September 20

- Peter Yu Tae-chol
- Hangul: 유대철
- RR: Yu Daecheol
- MR: Yu Taech'ŏl

Baptismal name
- Hangul: 베드로
- RR: Bedeuro
- MR: Pedŭro

Peter Yu Tae-chol (Korean: 유대철 베드로; c. 1826 – October 31, 1839) was one of the 103 canonised Korean Martyrs during the Gihae persecution of 1839, and a son of a government interpreter named Augustine Nyou Tjin-kil, also a martyr. His feast day is October 21, and he is also venerated along with the rest of the 103 Korean martyrs on September 20.

After giving himself up, he was beaten, tortured with hot coals and then sent to prison, where he was strangled at the age of 13.

== Bibliography ==
- The Lives of the 103 Martyr Saints of Korea 33: Saint Yu Tae-chol Peter (1826 ~ 1839), Catholic Bishops' Conference of Korea Newsletter No. 53 (Winter 2005).
- “Saint Petrus Yu Tae-Ch’ol“. CatholicSaints.Info. 4 June 2018. Web. 24 December 2018.
