= Jeanne Merkus =

Dutch guerilla soldier and political activist

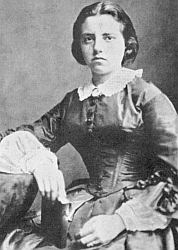
Jeanne "Jenny" Merkus

Jeanne Merkus (Batavia, 11 October 1839 – Utrecht, 1 February 1897), was a Dutch deaconess, guerilla soldier, and political activist.

She was an educated deaconess and worked tending the wounded in Paris during the Franco-Prussian War.

Between 1873 and 1876, she was a member of the Serbian rebel guerilla of Mićo Ljubibratić, participating in fighting the Ottoman Empire in Herzegovina, dressed as a male soldier and leading soldiers in battle.

She served by organizing the army medical service on the Serbian side during the Serbian–Turkish Wars (1876–1878).

She was famous in the contemporary international press and referred to as the "Joan of Arc of the Balkans."
