= Rosalie Gabler =

Rosalie Adolfine Johanna Gabler (c.1870–1949) was a German-British psychotherapist. A "good friend and former pupil" of the pioneer psychoanalyst Wilhelm Stekel, she translated several books by Stekel into English.

== Life ==
Around 1901 Gabler had a child, Katharina. She subsequently divorced her husband and moved with her daughter to England. In the early 1920s, she befriended Harold Samuel Coxeter, father of the future geometer Harold Coxeter. In 1922, her daughter Katie married Harold Samuel Coxeter.

Gabler was a member of the British Psychological Society and the Society for the Study of Orthopsychics. She also corresponded with the British Sexological Society.

In June 1934, she became naturalized as a British citizen. In the 1940s, she was living in Peaslake near Guildford.

== Works ==
- (tr.) The Beloved Ego: Foundations of the New Study of the Psyche by Wilkelm Stekel. Kegan Paul & Co.: London, 1921.
- (tr.) Disguises of Love: Psychoanalytic Sketches by Wilhelm Stekel. London: K. Paul, Trench, Trubner, 1922.
- (tr.) Conditions of Nervous Anxiety and their Treatment by Wilhelm Stekel. London: K. Paul, Trench, Trubner, 1923.
