= Vénérande Robichaud =

- Born: 1 March 1753; Annapolis Royal, Nova Scotia
- Died: 22 November 1839 (aged 86); Quebec City, Quebec
- Citizenship: Kingdom of Great Britain
- Occupation: Businesswoman

Vénérande Robichaud (1 March 1753 – 22 November 1839) was a Canadian businesswoman. She is best known for her correspondence with her brother Otho Robichaud.

== Early life ==
Vénérande Robichaud was born on 1 March 1753 in Annapolis Royal, [Nova Scotia. She was the youngest daughter of Louis Robichaud, a merchant, and his wife Jeanne Bourgeois. Her father had good relations with the British authorities, supplying them with food, timber, and firewood. In 1729, he took the oath of allegiance to George II the King of Great Britain.

In 1755, despite her father's good relations with the British authorities, Vénérande and her family were still deported during the deportation of the Acadians. They were, however, fortunate to choose their destination, which was Boston, a city in the state of Massachusetts. A few months later, the Massachusetts government transferred them to Cambridge. In this city, Vénérande learned English while her father taught her to read and write French. In 1766, Vénérande's parents missed an opportunity to return to Annapolis Royal.

== Heading to Quebec ==
As a family supportive of the Loyalists, the Robichauds moved to Lower Canada, where they settled in Quebec City, at the outbreak of the American Revolution in 1775. Vénérande took care of her elderly parents during the move. Her father died of flea fever on 20 December 1780 and her mother died on 18 March 1790. Two of her brothers also died in Quebec.

Meanwhile, three of her brothers, Otho, Frédéric and Florent, went to Néguac, now in New Brunswick, to trade. Otho sent various goods to resell in Quebec while Vénérande supplied him with bedding, flour, medicines, spinning wheels and carding machines.

In Quebec, Vénérande stayed for a long time with her cousin Marie-Vénérande Pelerin, wife of the goldsmith François Ranvoyzé. She frequently received visits from family friends living in Boston, English people from New Brunswick, missionaries from the Chaleur Bay like Thomas Cooke, Acadians from the same region as well as Micmacs. These guests allowed her to keep up to date with the latest news from her "dear Acadia" and sometimes to act as couriers. She also maintained a correspondence with her brother Otho; about fifteen of these letters have been preserved. These letters bear witness to the exiles' struggle between their scattered families and their living conditions.

== Death ==
She died on 22 November 1839 in Quebec.
