= Josephine Gabler =

American physician

Dr. Josephine Gabler (January 16, 1879 – June 13, 1961) was a physician best known for performing illegal abortions in Chicago, serving the entire Midwest, during the 1930s.

== Career ==
Gabler graduated from medical school in 1905 and was licensed to practice that year; by the late 1920s, she had begun to specialize in abortion. Gabler and the other doctors at her clinic performed more than 18,000 abortions between 1932 and 1941, or approximately five a day. Patients were referred by their physicians, or sometimes heard about the clinic from friends or relatives. Information about the clinic comes from seventy patient records preserved in legal documents. In 1941, police raided Gabler's clinic, and confiscated her patient records. These records indicated that over 200 Chicago physicians had been sending patients to her clinic for abortion procedures.

== Influence ==
In the 1920s and 30s, on State Street in downtown Chicago, Gabler specialized in abortions in a time of great repression. She recognized that more women were moving into the working world, and she provided a service to them that allowed women reproductive independence. On another note, she broke the law, and was arrested. Gabler was a significant player in women's health by providing abortions in accordance with standard medical procedures during a time where the number of abortions occurring in the United States ranged from 250,000 to 2 million per year.

== Sources ==
- Leslie J. Reagan, When Abortion Was A Crime, University of California Press 1997
- Langum, David J. "A Personal Voyage of Exploration through the Literature of Abortion History." Law and Social Inquiry 25, no. 2 (2000): 693–703.
