= Otto Christian von Rohr =

Major General Otto Christian von Rohr (died 1839) was a Prussian army officer during the Napoleonic Wars.

== Biography ==
In 1806, Rohr was made a captain in the Kleist Infantry Regiment. In 1816, he was commander of the 6th Kurmark Landwehr-Regiment. In 1817, he was promoted to Major General on his retirement from the army. He was then a member of the General-Orders-Commission.
