= Christian Wilberg =

German painter

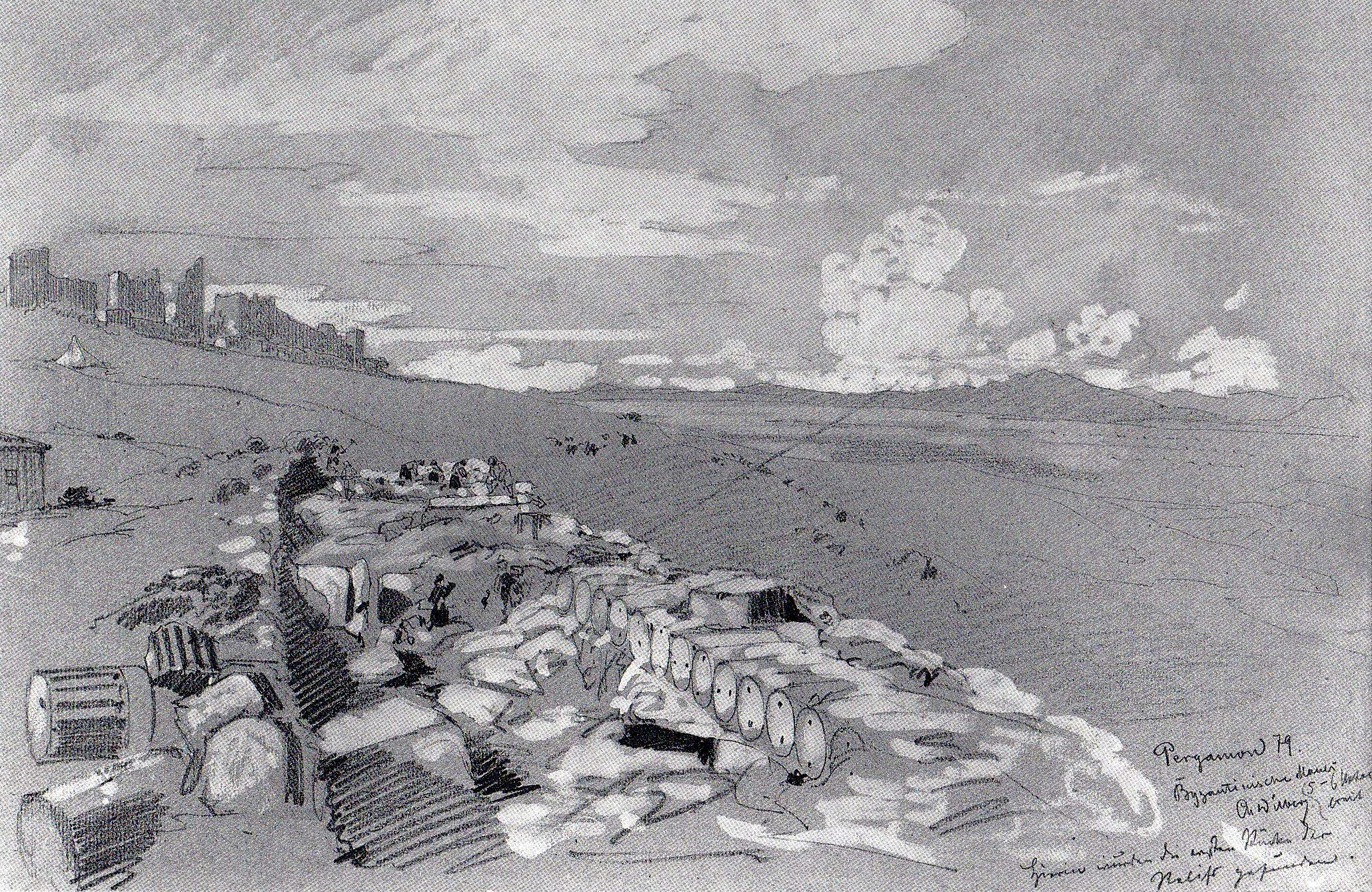
Pencil drawing: Ausgrabungen an der byzantinischen Mauer

Christian Wilberg (20 November 1839 – 3 June 1882) was a German painter.

Wilberg was born in 1839 in Havelberg in the Margraviate of Brandenburg (nowadays Saxony-Anhalt) where he lived until 1861. He was originally a house painter before moving to Berlin where he studied painting at Eduard Pape's atelier. After 18 months, Pape suggested to Wilberg that he should study further with Paul Gropius, where he acquired a good knowledge of perspective and architecture. After finishing his apprenticeship under Oswald Achenbach's supervision in Düsseldorf in 1870, Wilberg traveled through Northern Germany and spent two years in Venice. Even after returning to Berlin, Wilberg continued visiting Italy as his favourite field of art was Italian architecture. Amongst his most important works in this field are his paintings of St Mark's Basilica in Venice and the Cappella Palatina in Palermo.

In 1880, Wilberg painted a panorama of the Gulf of Naples for the Berlin Fishery exhibition, which gained him recognition amongst insiders. In the year before he went on a trip to Pergamon with the director of the Berlin Collection of Classical Antiquities. It was here that Wilberg made a series of sketches of the Acropolis which he later utilised for paintings. He acquired a large knowledge in ancient architecture and used this to conceive reconstructions of Roman buildings – one of which was later hung in Berlin's famous Café Bauer.

Wilberg's last major project was a great panorama of the Baths of Caracalla which he created for the Berlin Hygiene exhibition of 1882. This last major work was incinerated when the exhibition hall caught fire and Wilberg only had time to save a few paintings and drawings. After the fire, Wilberg travelled to France in the company of Werner Ludwig Pietsch in order to paint in Sedan; on his way there, he got ill while visiting Paris. He died there shortly afterwards. In October and November 1882 a special exhibition including more than 677 of Wilberg's works was held in Berlin's National Gallery. Some of the paintings from this exhibition, Villa Mondagrone and a number of oil sketches in watercolour and pencil drawings, were transferred to the National Gallery's ownership. In 1883, the Old Masters Picture Gallery in Dresden was presented with Memento Mori, one of Wilberg's motifs of the Sabini Mountains in Italy.
