= Barbara Yi =

Korean martyr (1825–1839)

Saint Barbara Yi

Martyr
- Born: 1825; Songpa District, Seoul, Joseon
- Died: 27 May 1839 (aged 13–14); Prison in Seoul
- Venerated in: Roman Catholic Church
- Beatified: 5 July 1925 by Pope Pius XI
- Canonized: 6 May 1984 by Pope John Paul II
- Feast: 27 May

Saint Barbara Yi (Korean: 이 바르바라; Hanja: 李巴巴拉; 1825–1839) was a 14-year-old Korean girl who was made a Catholic saint. She was imprisoned for her faith and died during her imprisonment on 27 May 1839, in Seoul, Joseon. She is one of the Martyrs of Korea canonized on 6 May 1984 by Pope John Paul II.

== Martyrdom ==
Barbara was put in prison for her faith. She suffered from typhoid fever in the prison. This disease caused excruciating pain and was very easily transmitted in prisons because of the unhealthy environment in crowded and cramped prison cells. Barbara suffered for one week, and died in prison in Seoul on 27 May 1839, at the age of 15.

== Canonisation ==
Saint Barbara was venerated by Pope Pius XI (decree of martyrdom) on 9 May 1925, Beatified on 5 July 1925 by Pope Pius XI and canonised on 6 May 1984 by Pope John Paul II.
