= Christoph August Gabler =

German composer

Christoph August Gabler (15 March 1767, in Mühldorf – 15 April 1839, in Saint Petersburg) was a German classical composer. He studied theology at Leipzig. Ernst Pauer said that Gabler "followed up with zeal his musical studies" in his book A Dictionary of Pianists and Composers for the Pianoforte. Gabler became a music teacher in Reval in 1800, where he performed music and met with success and fame. In 1836 he settled in Saint Petersburg. He died in his home in 1839 and was buried in Saint Petersburg. Gabler was a prolific composer and his works include three sonatas, Op. 19; Sonata, Op. 26; Sonatine, Op. 46; Adagio and Rondo, Op. 50; and several sets of variations and fugues.
