= Edward Abraham Kusel =

American photographer

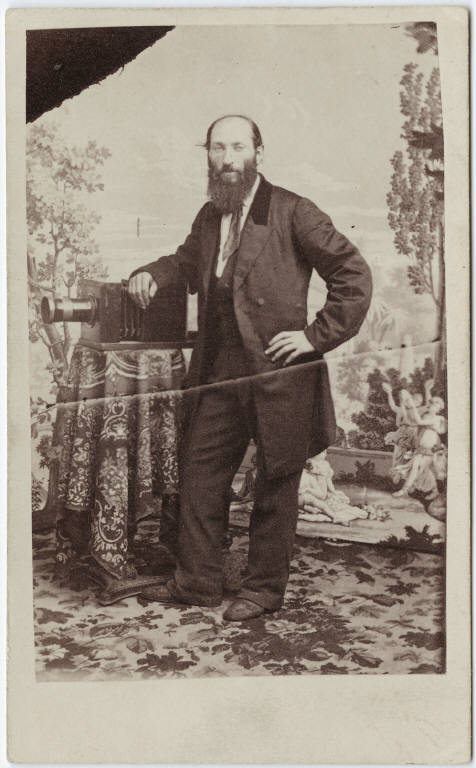
- Born: August 1, 1824; Mecklenburg-Vorpommern, Prussia
- Died: April 5, 1907 (aged 82); Oroville, California, United States
- Resting place: Oroville Jewish Cemetery
- Known for: Photography
- Spouse: Bertha Heilbronner

Edward Abraham Kusel (1824-1907) was an American photographer and merchant. Born in Prussia, Kusel immigrated to the United States during the California Gold Rush. He eventually arrived in California, in 1852, making him one of the first Jewish settlers in the state. During his time as a merchant, he imported one of the first sewing machines into California. In 1859, he founded his photography studio, where he developed scientifically-based photography methods to improve early portrait photography. Kusel is considered a pioneer of the town of Oroville, California, where he served as a school board trustee for thirty years, built the first schoolhouse in the town, and donated a founding collection of books to the Oroville Public Library.

== Early life and arrival in America ==
Edward Abraham Kusel was born in 1824 in Mecklenburg-Vorpommern in Prussia. His father, Abraham, was a veteran of the Napoleonic Wars. Around 1850, Kusel heard about the California Gold Rush. He left for America to find his fortune, running out of money upon arrival in New York. For the duration of 1850-51, Kusel worked out east, saving money to move to California. Interested in the sciences since he was a child, he followed early developments in electrical engineering and photography.

At the end of 1851, Kusel started his journey west. He spent time in Chicago and St. Louis and then walked to Salt Lake City, where he purchased a burro that he rode to California, arriving in Placerville in 1852.

He visited Sacramento and San Francisco. It was during these visits that Kusel found a demand for firefighting equipment due to frequent fires in both cities. He relocated to Marysville, where he started a fire hose company. During that time, he imported one of the first sewing machines into California to create canvas fire hoses.

== Career in photography ==
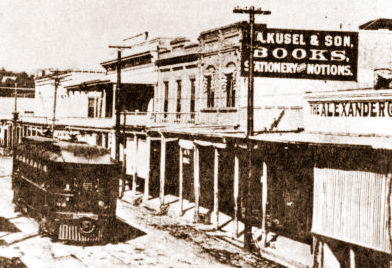
Kusel's downtown Oroville store in 1906

Kusel moved to the settlement of Oroville in 1856, just two years after a post office was opened in the community. In Oroville, Kusel opened a shop, selling books, stationery and office supplies. He met and married Bertha Heilbronner, whom he married around 1856, and in 1858 the couple had their first child, Carolus (Carl).

Kusel created a photography studio behind his Oroville boutique, where he offered portrait photography. In 1859, he opened a photography studio in Marysville. He offered both photographs and ambrotypes on leather and paper.

On November 5, 1860, Kusel became a United States citizen in Butte County. From 1860 until 1869, Kusel owned a 150-acre ranch outside of Chico.

He opened his third studio in Sacramento in 1861, offering sun printing. It was at this gallery where he created a strict regime around specific colors of clothing to wear in order to achieve the best portraits. Additionally, Kusel became a regular contributor to Humphrey's Journal starting in 1863. He published works about photographic negative pinholes, solution development, fogging, collodion film, and other photography subjects. He also published a major piece in the Philadelphia Photographer in April 1869 documenting enameling, including troubleshooting. In the piece, Kusel used photographs of his son, Eli, who was regularly used as a model in Kusel's experiments.

Kusel continued to maintain his Oroville gallery, where he returned to around 1865. He also opened another gallery in Chico in 1869, which also offered a general store. In 1878, Kusel's oldest son, Carl, joined Kusel in the photography business and the company was named E. A. Kusel and Son. The Chico store operated until 1884.

In the 1890s, a flood destroyed many of the negatives from Kusel's work, which were kept in the basement of his general store in Oroville. Eli Kusel operated his medical practice above the store until 1941.

== Life in Oroville ==
Kusel served on the Oroville school board for thirty-five years. He donated the funds and equipment to build the first schoolhouse in the town. In 1903, Kusel donated 60 books to the Oroville Public Library. He was a member of the Union League, where he supported abolitionist causes, and was an Oddfellow. He was an active member of the Union for Reform Judaism, donating money to promote education and agriculture. He was also a regular contributor to The American Israelite.

Kusel was an avid telegraphist and installed the first telephones in Oroville.

Kusel died in 1907, after becoming sick with pneumonia after a flood in Oroville. He is buried in the Oroville Jewish Cemetery.

== Legacy ==
Kusel Road, located in Oroville, is named after Kusel and his family. A collection of Kusel's work is held in the collection of the California Historical Society.
