= Table Mountain (Butte County, California) =

North and South Table Mountain, Butte County, California

North Table Mountain and South Table Mountain are two prominent basaltic mesas overlooking the city of Oroville, California. They lie a few miles north of Oroville in Butte County, California. In the scientific literature, both mesas are also known as North Oroville Table Mountain and South Oroville Table Mountain to differentiate them from the Tuolumne Table Mountain, which is also capped by the eroded remnant of a basaltic (or, more properly, a latite) lava flow, in the central foothills of California. They are named for their flat surface, like a table top; because of this it is often mistakenly called Table Top Mountain.

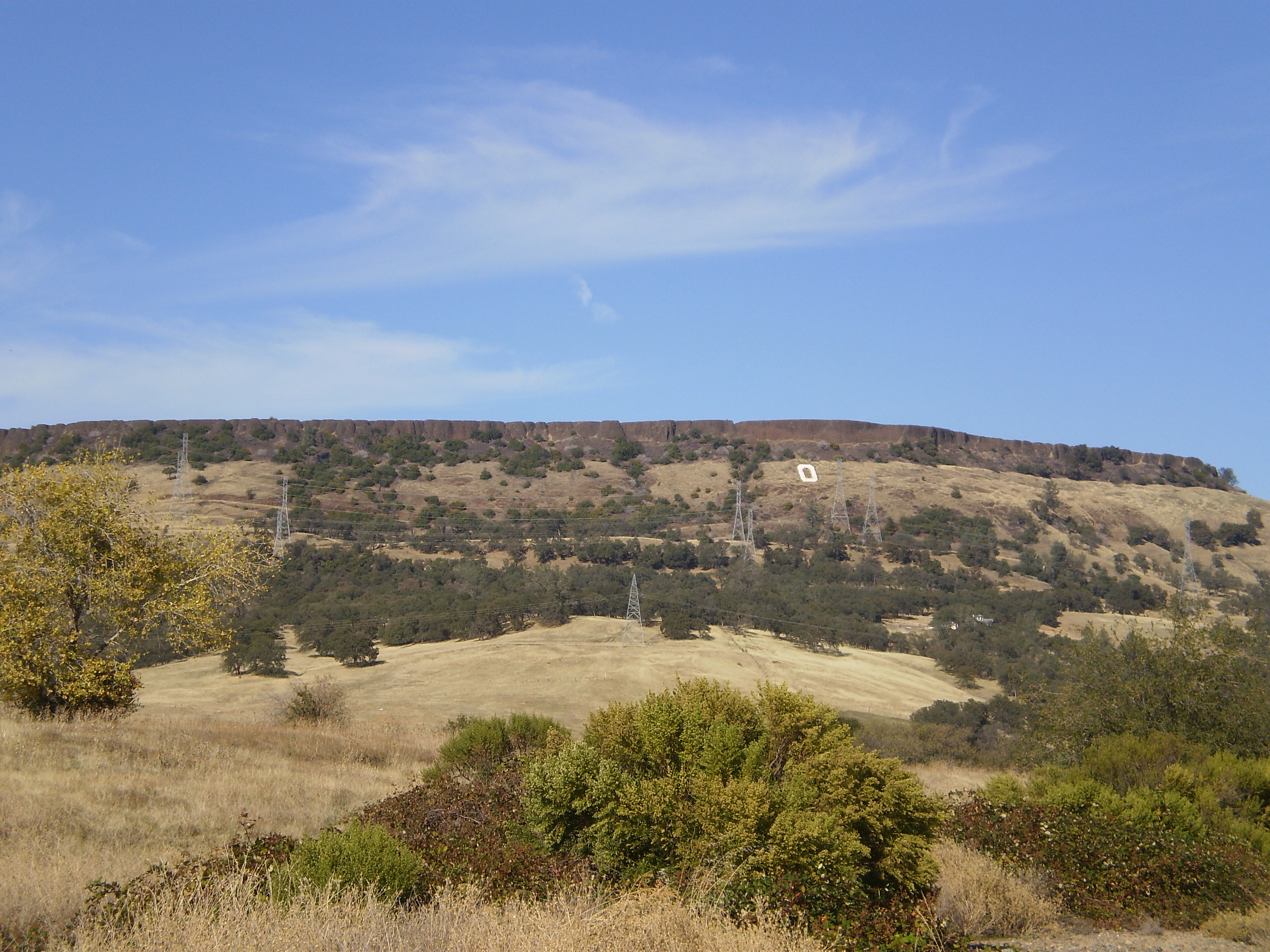
South Table Mountain with the symbolic "O", which stands for (and faces) the city of Oroville

== Location and geography ==
North Table Mountain and South Table Mountain are capped by the eroded remnants of a Miocene lava flow. The dense, black basalt that caps North Table Mountain and South Table Mountain was initially called the Older Basalt. Later it was renamed the Lovejoy Formation. Finally, the Lovejoy Formation was renamed and is currently known as the Lovejoy Basalt.

=== South Table Mountain ===
South Table Mountain, at 39°33′23″N 121°33′00″W, is mostly privately owned, and contains the "O", which is a big "O" on the side of the plateau, that stands for "Oroville", the city that it towers over. Dedicated on June 8, 1929 by Oroville High School (OHS) alumni Morrow Steadman, the "big O" has a concrete thickness of four inches, and was measured by its builders to be 87 feet by 33 feet. It was intended to last through the generations and convey a spirit of good sportsmanship in local high school athletic events. The "O", and most of its access routes, are located on private property. It was to have another meaning, too, Steadman wrote in the '29 OHS Yearbook the Alpha, saying he hoped the "O" would remind students of "cooperation and teamwork, both on the athletic fields and in our school activities".

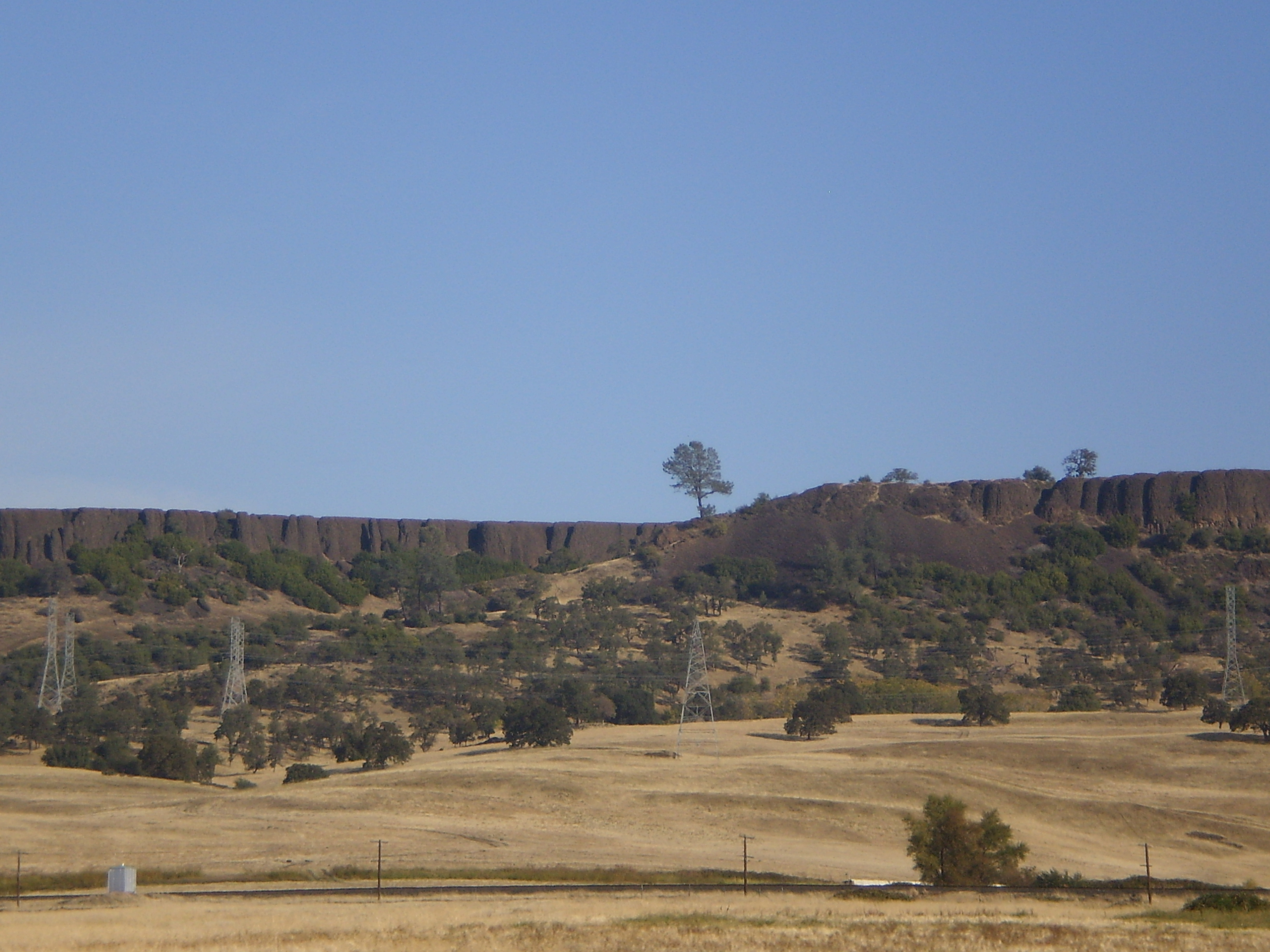
Southwest cliff faces of South Table Mountain, near Highway 70

=== North Table Mountain ===
North Table Mountain, at 39°38′10″N 121°33′00″W, is mostly private, but includes a small portion which is a wildlife area, and contains several vernal pools and waterfalls, including Phantom Falls, and Beatson Falls. There are two hiking trails, and information about these trails can be found on chicohiking.org. The best time to view the waterfalls is winter to early spring. They are usually dry during the summer months. Everything east of Cherokee Road in Morris Ravine is on private property and is off limits to visitors unless given specific permission.

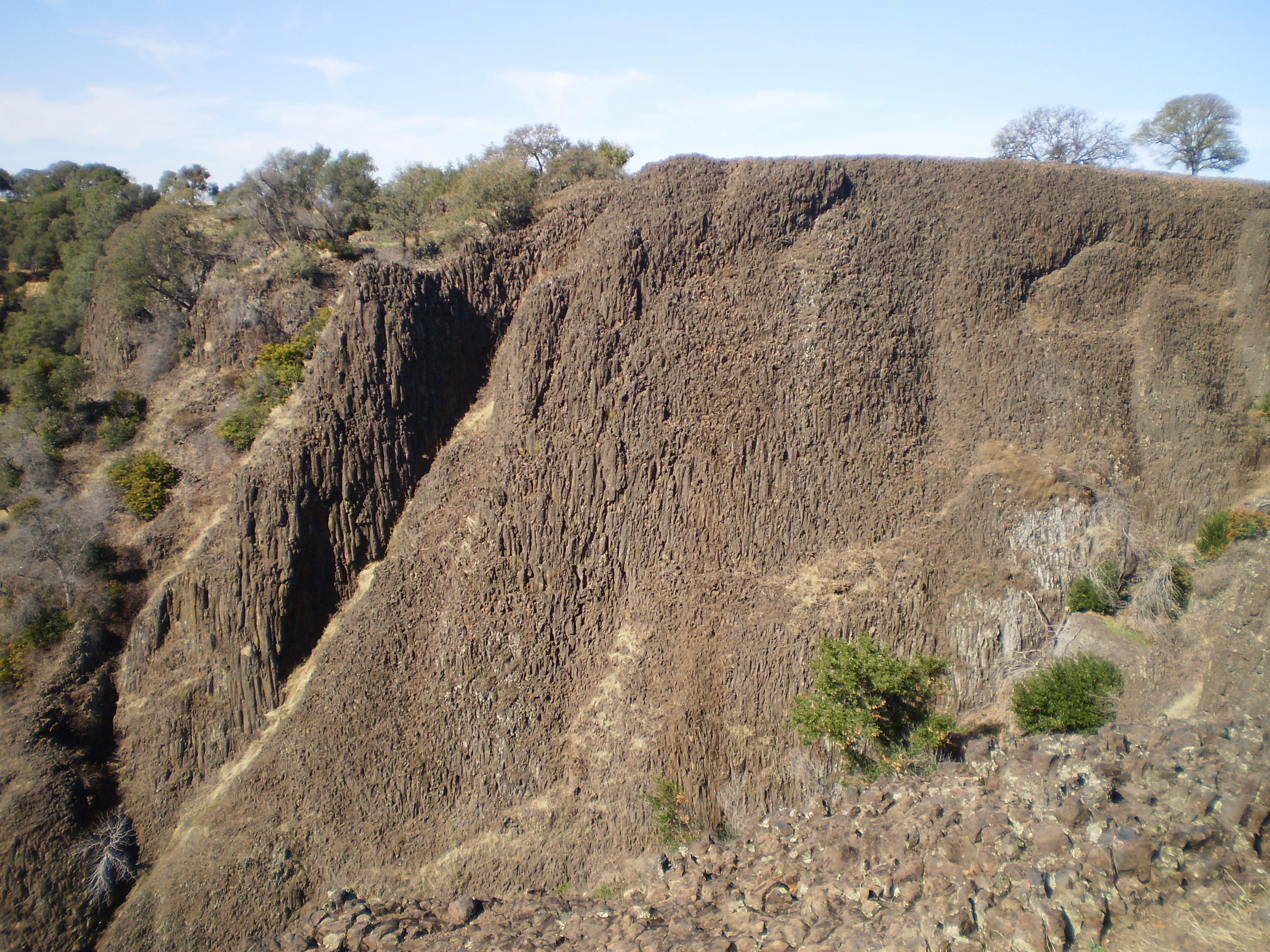
Lava wall on North Table Mountain.

=== Coal Canyon ===
Coal Canyon, where Phantom Falls is located, gets its name because it looks like coal, but is actually made from basalt. The canyon and waterfall are accessible by a difficult, steep downhill hike, and the canyon itself can also be hiked.

=== Caves ===
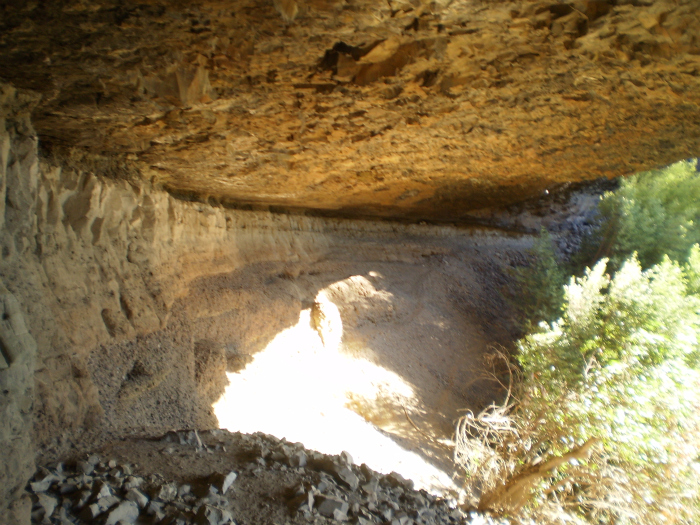
The cave at Phantom Falls

In addition to dozens of seasonal waterfalls, there are also several shallow caves scattered throughout the basalt canyons. There are about 5 caves located on North Table Mountain, all behind large waterfalls.

The largest cave is located at Phantom Falls, and the deepest cave is at Little Phantom Falls, which actually requires crawling. Both are located in Coal Canyon. A small cave is also located at Flag Falls and Beatson Falls.

Another cave is located behind a small unnamed waterfall.

The caves are made of a mixture of basalt and clay, and were created over thousands of years as the waterfalls eroded the rock. The two caves at Coal Canyon are the most easily accessible, and the one at Phantom Falls is the most visited.

== History ==
=== Cherokee ===
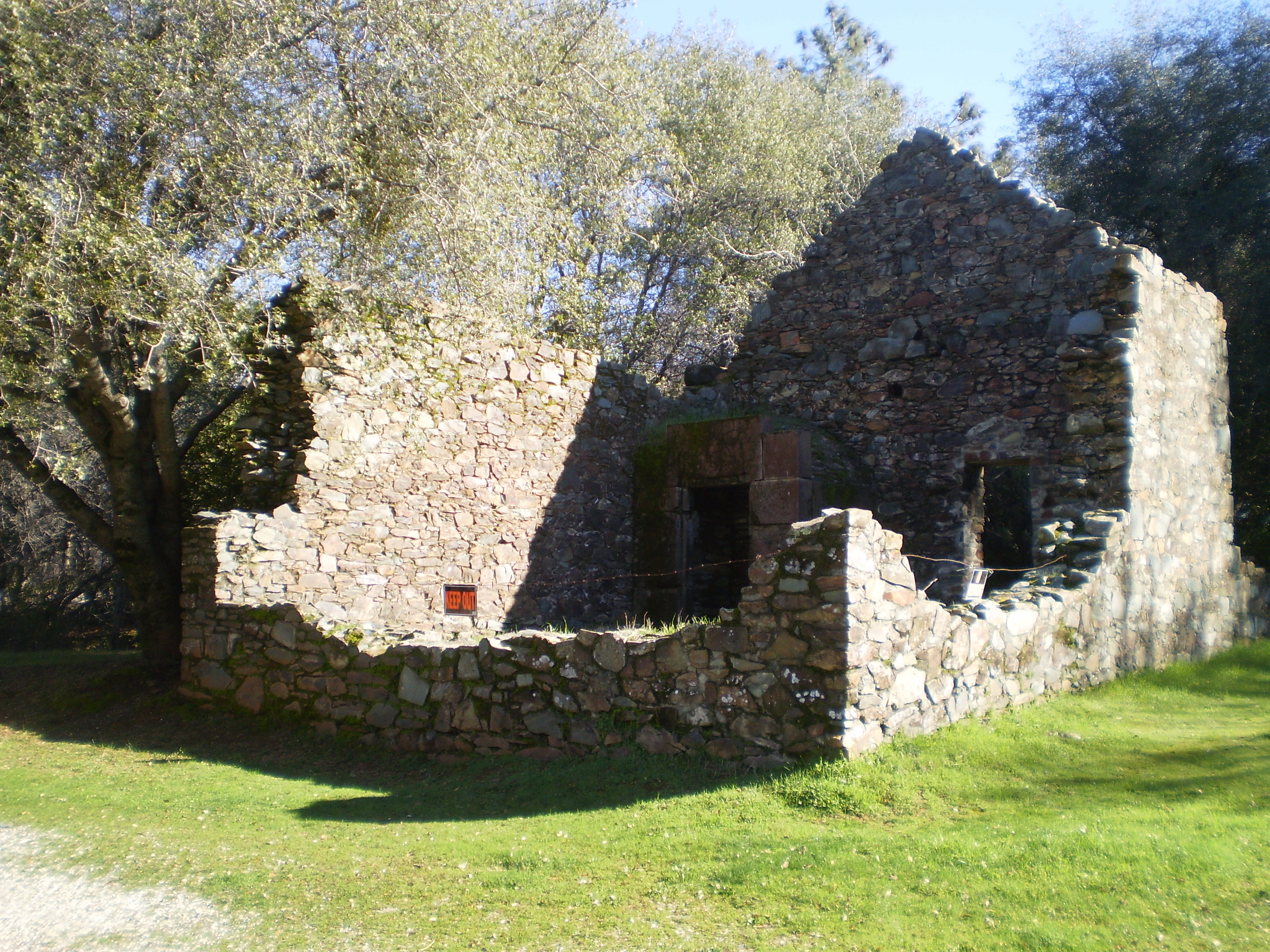
Cherokee ruins

The small ghost town of Cherokee, California, is on the mountain, and is named because a small group of Cherokee Native Americans were brought there and established a small community. Today only ruins remain, but the area is home to around 150 people.

=== Phantom Ranch ===
Phantom Ranch is the ruins of an ancient ranch house from the late 19th century that was used during the Gold Rush. The ranch can be seen from the Phantom Falls hike. The ranch is now completely in ruins, and the only thing left of it are a few pieces of wood where the foundation used to be.

== Wildlife ==
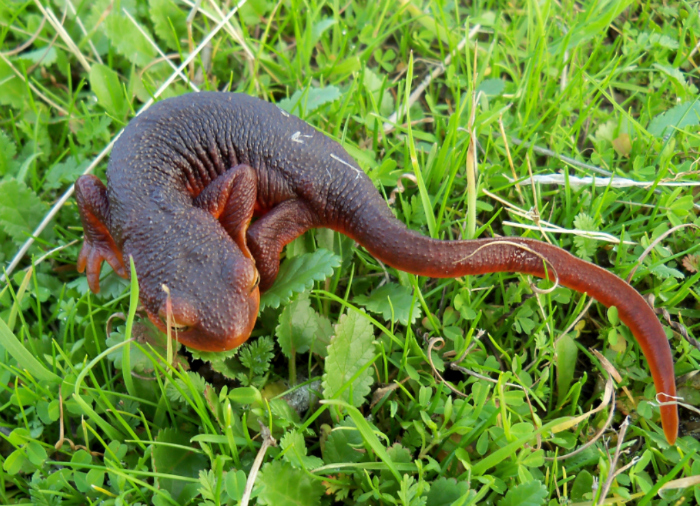
Newt on Table Mountain

The mountain includes several wildlife species, including: the California newt, banana slugs, different frog species, several bird species, western Pacific rattlesnake, garter snakes, California horned lizard, and several mammal species, including black-tailed deer, coyotes, mountain lion, and domesticated cattle, which move around freely. There is also a small area known as Sugarloaf Mountain, where several animals are said to live, including peacocks, foxes, and wild turkey.

== Climate and habitat ==
Both mountains are made up of two main habitats, grassland and forest. The climate is wet and rainy from late autumn to early spring, and hot and dry in the summer.

== Mining ==
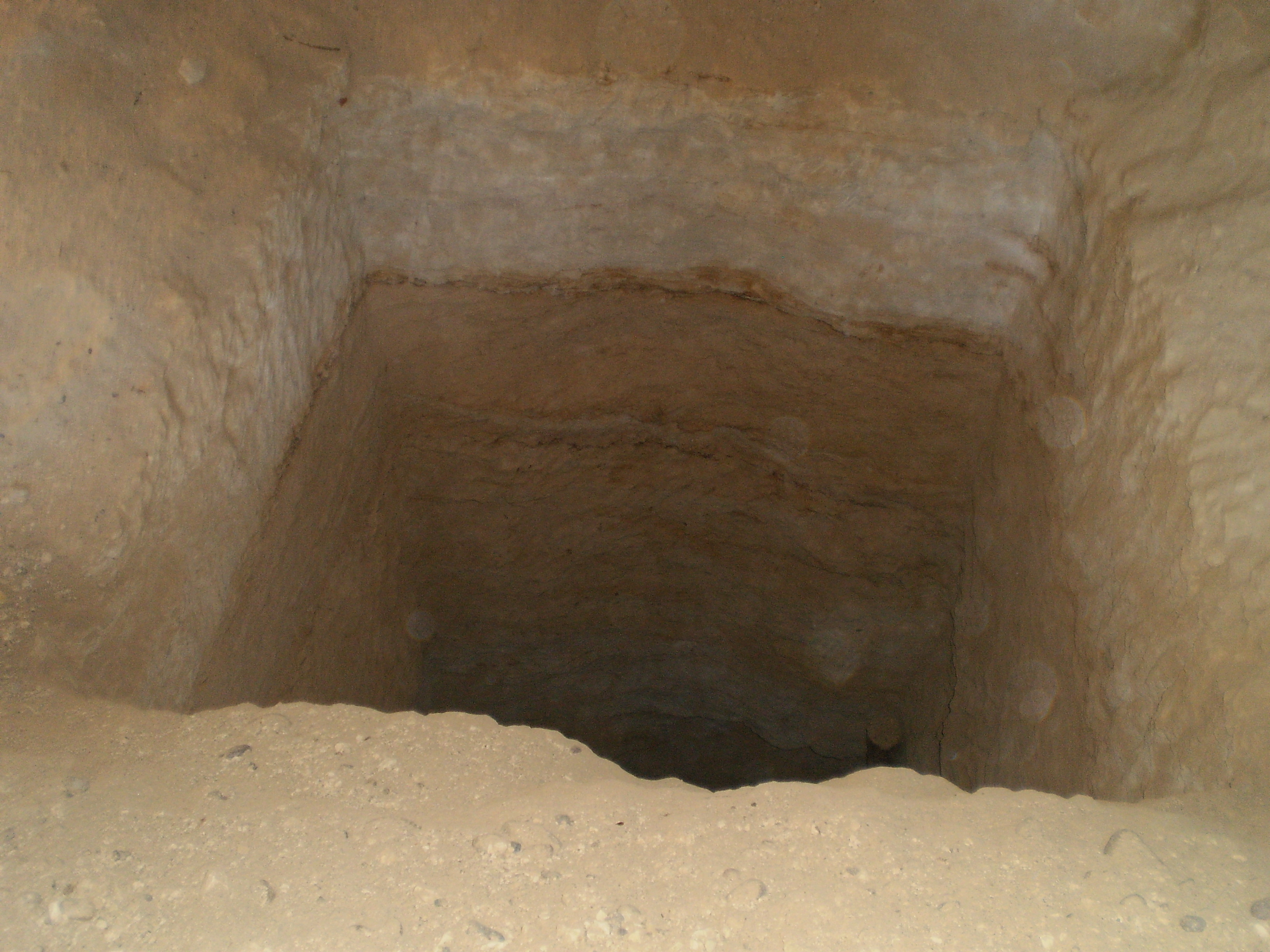
Abandoned mine shaft at Phantom Falls

There is a silicon mine at the bottom of North Table Mountain. There are also several old irrigation mines at the north end of North Table Mountain. There is also an old mine shaft at Phantom Falls, which was used during the Gold Rush. Research sometimes takes place at the mine, although it can be difficult. Hydraulic mining near Cherokee produced a large amount of gold before environmental concerns forced an end to it in the late 1800s.

== In film ==
Table Mountain was used to film scenes for Terence Young's movie (which starred O. J. Simpson) The Klansman, which were set in Alabama.

Clint Eastwood also used this location for parts of his 1976 film The Outlaw Josey Wales, as did director John Leone for the Henry Fonda film The Last of the Cowboys later the same year.

== Tours ==
Volunteers from the California Department of Fish and Wildlife have now started giving free tours on North Table Mountain. Tours are given the first and third Saturday of the month, Feb-May, when the waterfalls are flowing and flowers are blooming. Tours start from a parking lot on Cherokee road, and there are two tours a day, which last about two hours each.

== Spring wildflowers ==
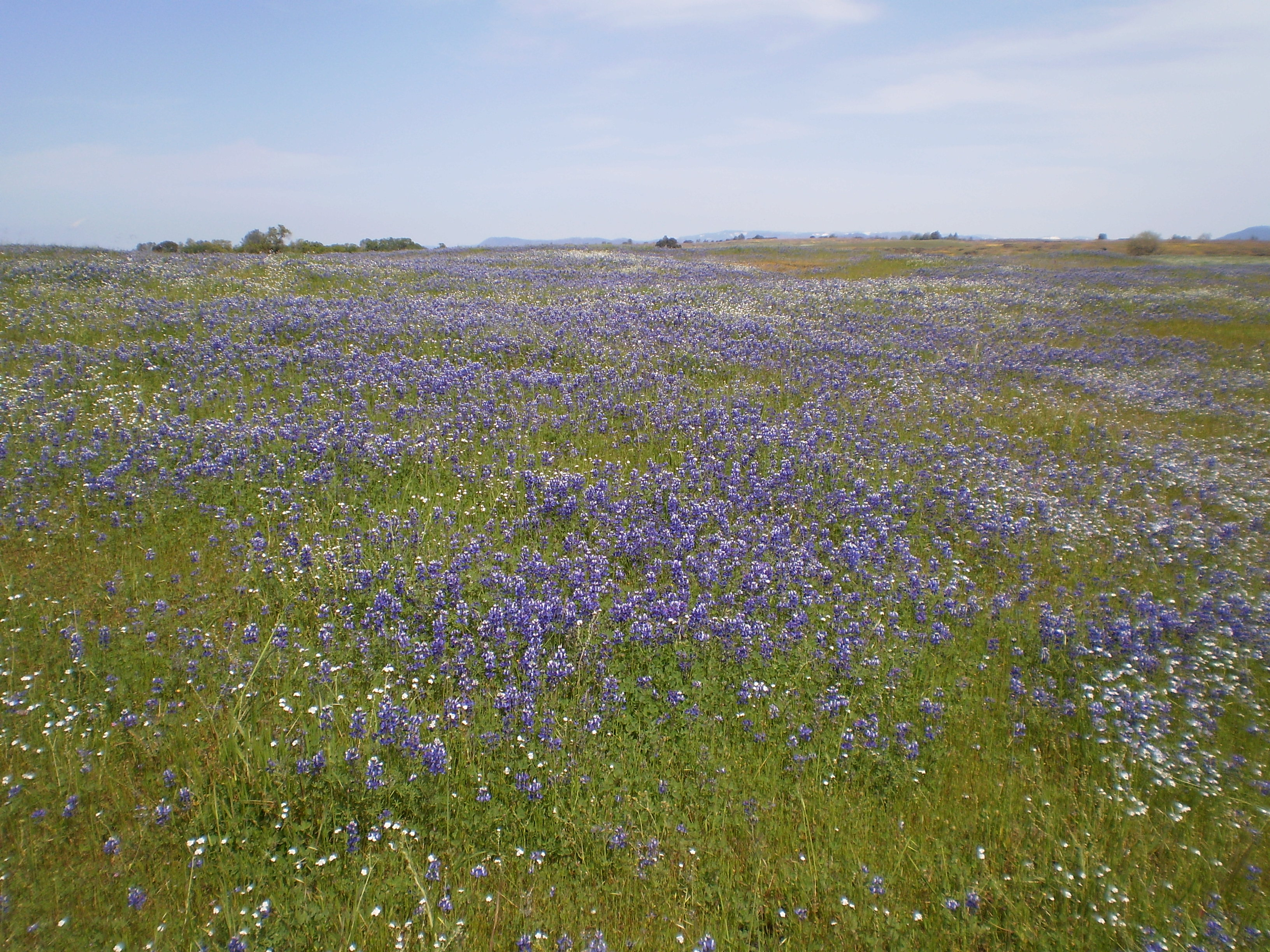
Lupine field on Table Mountain

Table Mountain is most famous for its vast array of wildflowers, which bloom during spring time. The bloom usually lasts from the last two weeks of March, to the first two weeks of April. The flower bloom is the most popular attraction on Table Mountain. During the time of the bloom, people come from all over Northern California to see the wildflowers, and tourism is at its highest. There are even photo-taking tours offered one weekend, but this changes every year. These tours are usually announced in the local paper and news.

There are several species of flowers that bloom during this period. The most common are lupine, frying-pan poppy, and goldfields. The flowers are protected by the California Department of Fish and Wildlife, so picking them is illegal, but visitors are allowed to look and even touch the flowers, as long as they are not damaged. Because the area has few trails, stepping on the flowers may be hard to avoid in some areas. It is advised that visitors are careful while trekking so the delicate flowers are not damaged. The best flowers are usually found in the area between Fern and Phantom Falls.

== List of waterfalls on Table Mountain ==
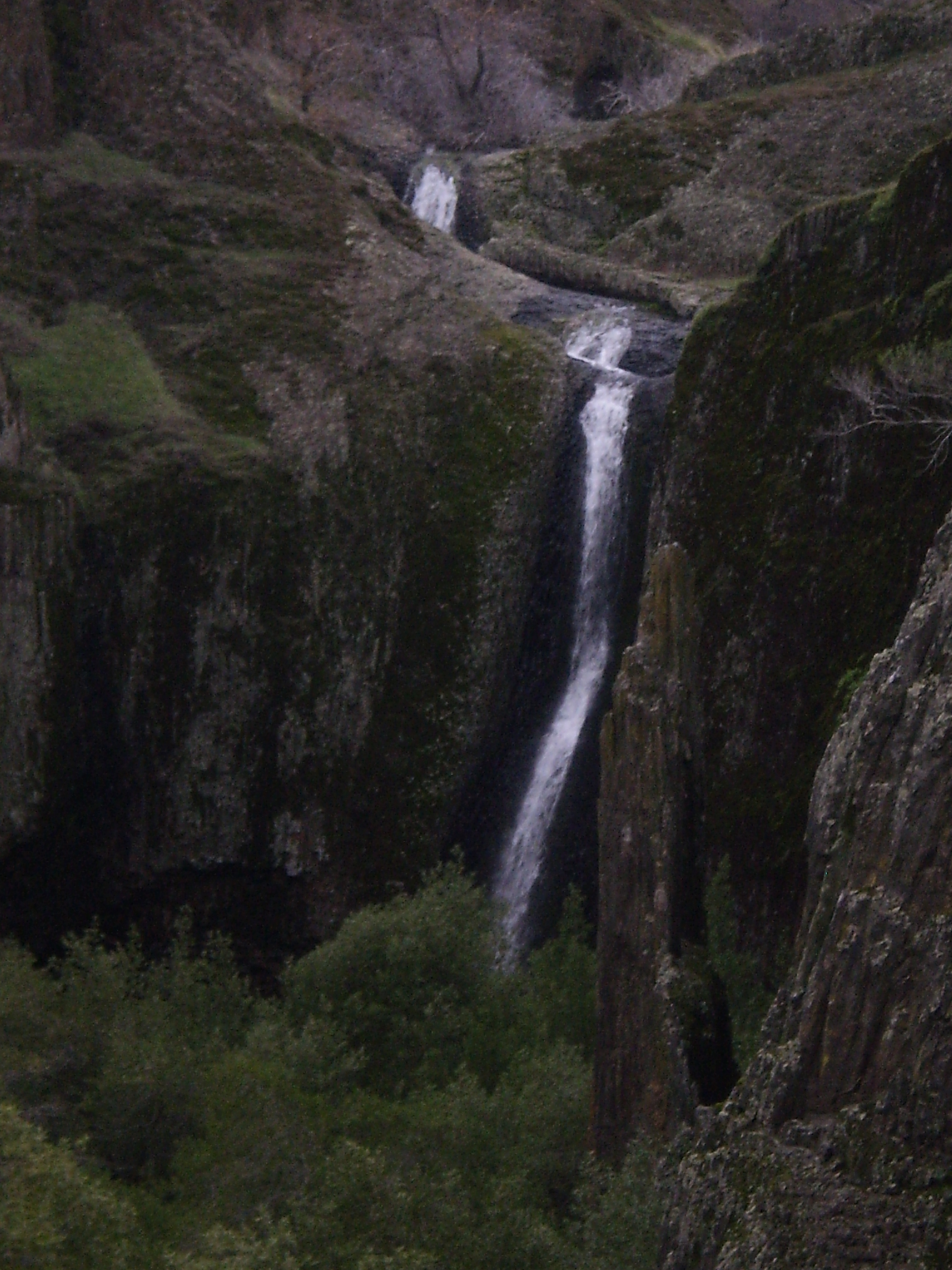
Beatson Falls on Table Mountain

- Beatson Falls
- Catamount Falls
- Coon Falls
- Crack Falls (Crevice Falls)
- Fern Falls (Ravine Falls)
- Flag Falls
- Hidden Falls
- Hollow Falls
- Little Phantom Falls
- Long Falls (Ranch Falls)
- Lower Ravine Falls
- Phantom Falls (Coal Canyon Falls)
- Ravine Twin Falls
- Schirmer Cascade
- Schirmer Falls
- Scott Falls
- Western Falls

There are also several smaller waterfalls that are unnamed.
