= Arthur R. Wilson =

U.S. Army Major General

Arthur Riehl Wilson
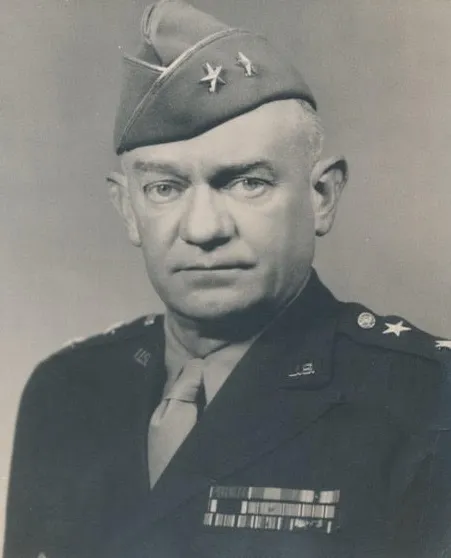
- Arthur R. Wilson
- Born: July 18, 1894; Cherokee, California, United States
- Died: August 11, 1956 (aged 62); San Francisco, California, United States
- Military career
- Allegiance: United States
- Branch: United States Army
- Service years: 1916-1946
- Rank: Major General
- Service number: 0-8346
- Unit: Field Artillery Branch
- Commands: Coastal Base Section
- Conflicts: Pancho Villa Expedition; World War I World War II: Operation Torch; Operation Dragoon
- Awards: Army Distinguished Service Medal (2); Legion of Merit (2); Bronze Star Medal; Order of the Crown of Italy

Major General Arthur Riehl Wilson (July 18, 1894 – August 11, 1956) was a United States Army officer who served during World War I and World War II. He served in the Pacific Theater as quartermaster of United States Army Forces in Australia, in the Meditteranean Theatre as commander of the Atlantic and Mediterranean Base Sections, and in France and Germany as commander of the Coastal Base Section and

== Early career and World War I ==
Arthur R. Wilson was born on July 18, 1894, in Cherokee, California, as the son of Alexander Moffatt and Agnes Matilda Wilson. He attended grammar school in Cherokee and subsequently enrolled at Oroville Union High School. Following the graduation in summer 1913, he briefly worked as a reporter for the Oroville Mercury-Register. He entered the University of California at Berkeley and enlisted the California National Guard.

Wilson rose through the ranks from Private to Sergeant and left the University in June 1916, when his regiment was called for the federal service during Pancho Villa Expedition. He was ordered to the Mexican Border with 2nd California National Guard Infantry Regiment and was promoted to the rank of Quartermaster Sergeant. Wilson's unit was deactivated by the end of September 1916 and he returned to the civilian life.

Following the American entry into World War I in April 1917, Wilson entered the Army service and was commissioned as a second lieutenant in the Field Artillery Branch on August 15, 1917. He was ordered to the Presidio of San Francisco and attached to the 386th Field Artillery Regiment. Wilson completed basic training and moved with the regiment to Camp Lewis, Washington, in September 1917. He was promoted to the temporary rank of first lieutenant on April 11, 1918, and embarked for France in June that year. He was meanwhile promoted to the temporary rank of captain on May 24, 1918, and was stationed at Camp de Souge, where he participated in the training of replacement units.

Upon the signing of the Armistice with Germany in November 1918, he participated in the occupation of the Rhineland, Germany until February 1919, when his regiment was ordered back to the United States.

== Interwar period ==
Following his return to the United States, Wilson remained in the Army and was stationed at Fort Collins, Colorado. He was allowed to complete his education at the University of California and graduated with Bachelor of Arts degree in May 1919. Wilson then assumed duty as Professor of Military Science and Tactics at Colorado Agricultural College and remained in that capacity until October that year, when he was sent to Fort Sill, Oklahoma, for duty with 9th Field Artillery Regiment.

On July 1, 1920, Wilson was transferred to the Regular Army and commissioned first lieutenant and Captain on the same day. While at Fort Sill, he entered the Army Field Artillery School in September 1921 and following the graduation in June of the following year. Wilson then moved to Columbia, Missouri, where he assumed duty as a Professor of Military Science and Tactics at University of Missouri. His tenure there ended in September 1926 and joined 76th Field Artillery Regiment at the Presidio of Monterey, California, and remained until March 1928, when he was sent to the Schofield Barracks, Hawaii, for service with 13th Field Artillery Regiment.

In December 1930, Wilson returned stateside and joined the headquarters of Experimental Mechanized Force at Fort Eustis, Virginia, under Brigadier general Daniel Van Voorhis as Publicity Officer. The mission of the Force was to conduct experiments in armored warfare and test experimental armored equipment. The attached subordinate units came under the control of the Mechanized Force for specific training events related to the testing of equipment or tactics and Wilson was in the frequent contact with the press.

Wilson moved to Fort Knox, Kentucky, and became Post Adjutant in November 1931 and remained in that capacity until August 1932, when he was ordered to the Army Command and General Staff College at Fort Leavenworth, Kansas, and graduated from the two-year course in June 1934. Wilson was then sent to the Army War College in Washington, D.C., where he completed advanced course in June 1935. He then attended the Chemical Warfare School at Edgewood Arsenal, Maryland, and following the graduation on August 1, 1935, he was promoted to major.

He then served as an instructor at the Army Command and General Staff College at Fort Leavenworth until July 1937, when he was sent to the War Department General Staff in Washington, D.C., for duty as Liaison officer with the Works Progress Administration (WPA), a New Deal agency, employing millions of job-seekers (mostly unskilled men) to carry out public works projects, including the construction of public buildings and roads.

Wilson was appointed Chief of the WPA Branch at the Supply Division, War Department General Staff in September 1939 and remained in that capacity until January 1940, when he resumed his previous duty as liaison officer with the War Department General Staff. He was appointed Chief of the Federal Works Agency Branch within the Supply Division in June 1940 and was promoted to lieutenant colonel on August 18 of that year. While in this capacity, Wilson was given additional duty as liaison officer with the Truman Committee under then-Senator Harry S. Truman, which was formed in March 1941 to find and correct problems in U.S. war production with waste, inefficiency, and war profiteering.

== World War II ==
Following the Japanese Attack on Pearl Harbor, Wilson was promoted to the temporary rank of colonel on December 24, 1941, and ordered back to the War Department General Staff. He was promoted to the temporary rank of brigadier general in January 1942, and sailed with the first waves of American troops to the Southwest Pacific. As chief quartermaster and assistant chief of staff, G-4, United States Army Forces in Australia, his mission was to "infuse vigor into all supply activities in Australia".

Wilson returned to the United States in June 1942 and then embarked for Europe as Commanding general, Services of Supply, Western Task Force during the Operation Torch, the Anglo–American invasion of French North Africa in November 1942. By the beginning of January 1943, Wilson was appointed Commanding General, Atlantic and Mediterranean Base Sections, U.S. North African Theater of Operations, and was responsible for the administration of supplies during the combat operations in that areas, and during the Allied invasion of Sicily in July–August 1943. Wilson was decorated with Legion of Merit for his service in 1942–1943. He was promoted to the temporary rank of major general on January 13, 1944.

In July 1944, Wilson was based in Naples, Italy as commanding general, Coastal Base Section, which accompanied the Seventh Army on 15 August 1944 during Operation Dragoon, the Allied invasion of Southern France. For the first three weeks Coastal Base Section was largely occupied with the operation of the landing beaches. Wilson also transformed Naples into the major supply center on the Italian mainland and did the similar work in two other ports. He commanded the Continental Base Section and then the Continental Advance Section (CONAD) until the end of the war.

Wilson's work was appreciated by the Italian Government and he was decorated with the Order of the Crown of Italy and the University of Naples awarded him an honorary degree of doctor of laws. The City of Naples conferred honorary citizenship upon him and he was also elected a Cavalier Magistrate, Order of the Knights of Malta, in connection with these recognition's of his significant part in helping to restore the life and culture of Free Italy. For his service in that capacity, Wilson received Army Distinguished Service Medal.

Wilson participated in the Ardennes-Alsace and Central Europe operations. He distinguished himself in this capacity and received second Army Distinguished Service Medal and Bronze Star Medal. He was also decorated with the Legion of Honour, Croix de Guerre with Palm by the Government of France. In 1945 he was conferred the Freedom of the City of Dijon.

== Postwar service and retirement ==
Wilson returned to the United States, where he was a military aide to Presidents Franklin D. Roosevelt and Harry S. Truman and a liaison officer between Congress and the War Department. He retired from active duty in May 1946, after almost thirty years of service, and accepted job as vice president of Trans World Airlines. He remained in this capacity until late 1947, when he opened is own trading company as vice president of Industrial Products Trading Company.

Wilson died at the Letterman General Hospital in San Francisco on August 11, 1956, and was buried at Cherokee Cemetery in Oroville, California.

== Decorations ==
Here is Major General Wilson's ribbon bar:

1st Row	Army Distinguished Service Medal with Oak Leaf Cluster			
2nd Row	Legion of Merit with Oak Leaf Cluster	Bronze Star Medal	Mexican Border Service Medal	World War I Victory Medal with one Battle Clasp
3rd Row	Army of Occupation of Germany Medal	American Defense Service Medal with Clasp	Asiatic–Pacific Campaign Medal	American Campaign Medal
4th Row	European-African-Middle Eastern Campaign Medal with five 3/16 inch service stars	World War II Victory Medal	Army of Occupation Medal	Commander of the Order of the British Empire
5th Row	Commander of the Legion of Honor (France)	French Croix de guerre 1939-1945 with Palm	Knight of the Grand Cross of the Order of the Crown of Italy	Officer of the Order of Ouissam Alaouite (Morocco)
