= Phantom Falls =

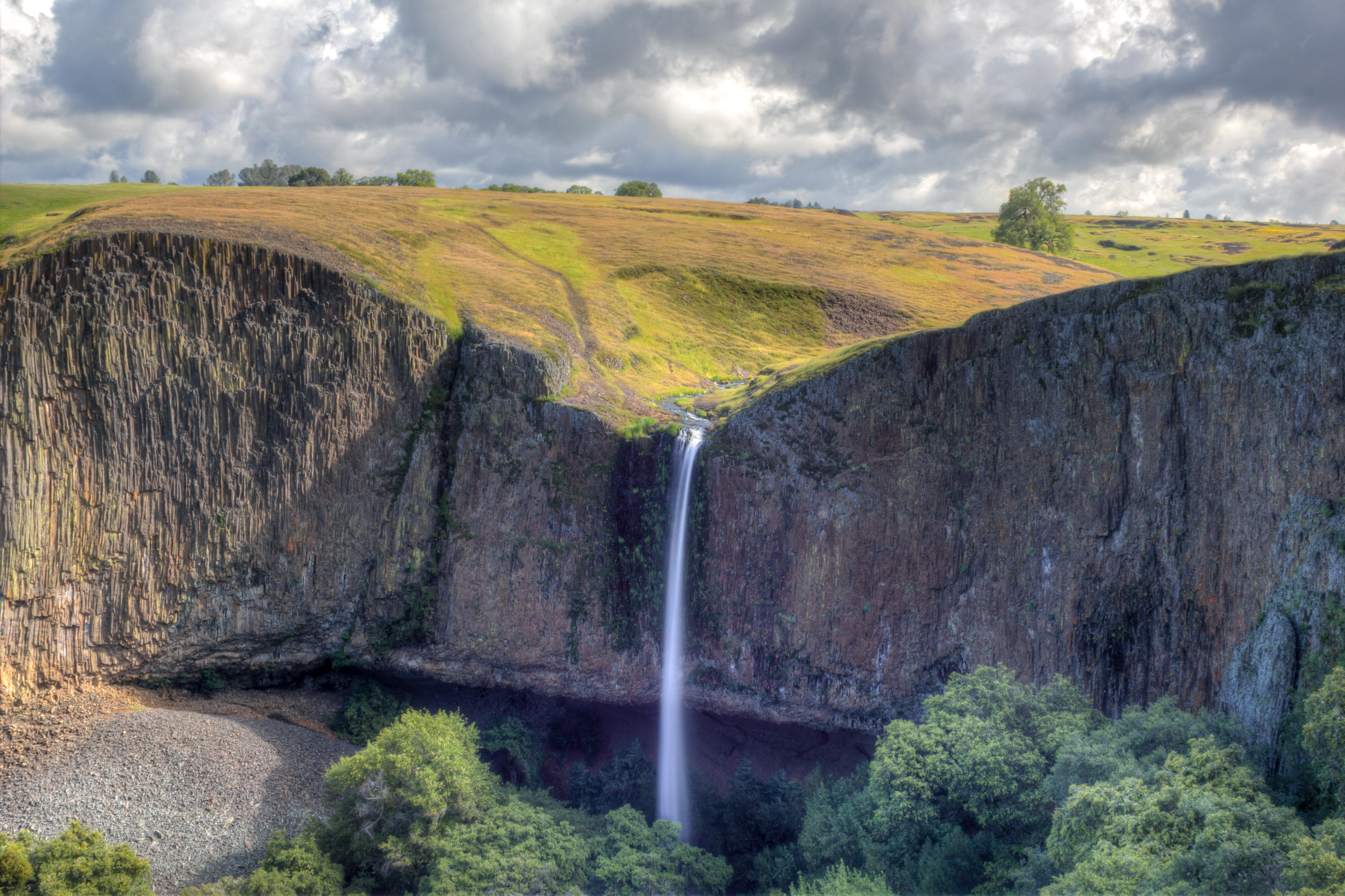
- Phantom Falls after spring rain, 2017

- Location within California
- Location: North Table Mountain (Butte County, California)
- Coordinates: 39°36′37″N 121°33′38″W
- Type: Plunge
- Total height: 130 ft (40 m)

Phantom Falls or Coal Canyon Falls is a waterfall at Coal Canyon near Oroville, California, within the North Table Mountain Ecological Reserve. The waterfall is 166 feet (51 m) high and runs off the edge of Coal Canyon, in front of a grotto. A small pool at the bottom is home to a California newt subspecies, the Coastal Range newt. As a seasonal waterfall, Phantom Falls runs only during the rainy months, late autumn to early spring. It is named Phantom Falls because it disappears during the dry season.

There is no trail to the waterfall, although a parking lot on Cherokee Road provides access for hikers. It is about 2 miles (3.2 km) from the parking lot to the waterfall, which is visible from the rim of Coal Canyon. A strenuous downhill hike then ends at the bottom of the waterfall. The falls can also be reached from Coal Canyon Road at the bottom of Coal Canyon, a hike of about the same distance but longer and more strenuous, over rocky terrain.

The shaft of an abandoned gold mine in the grotto behind the falls dates to the California Gold Rush. Today, there is no gold there, but research still takes place in the mineshaft. Entering the mineshaft is difficult but not prohibited.

== See also ==
- List of waterfalls
- List of waterfalls in California
