= Taikus, California =

Taikus (also, Tagas, Tagus, Taiku, Taikushi, and Tigres) is a former Maidu settlement in Butte County, California, United States. It was located near Cherokee at the head of Dry Creek; its precise location is unknown.
