= Las Plumas High School =

Location
- 2380 Las Plumas Ave; South Oroville; Oroville, Butte, California 95966; United States
- Coordinates: 39.48005°N 121.53683°W

Information
- Motto: Home of the Thunderbirds
- Established: 1960
- School district: Oroville Union High School District
- School number: (530) 538-2310
- Principal: Shanna Lee
- Staff: 58.58 (FTE)
- Grades: 9 - 12
- Student to teacher ratio: 22.17
- Campus size: 64 acres
- Campus type: Suburban
- Colours: Red, white, and blue
- Fight song: "Thunderbird Fight Song"
- Mascot: Thunderbird
- Rival: Oroville High School
- Newspaper: The Las Plumas Times
- Yearbook: Legend
- Website: lphs.ouhsd.org

Las Plumas High School (LP) is located in the north valley in Oroville, California, United States, about 70 miles north of Sacramento. The school was established in the autumn of 1961. The class of 1965 was the first class to go from freshmen to seniors at the school. Its main sports rival is Oroville High School.

== Location ==
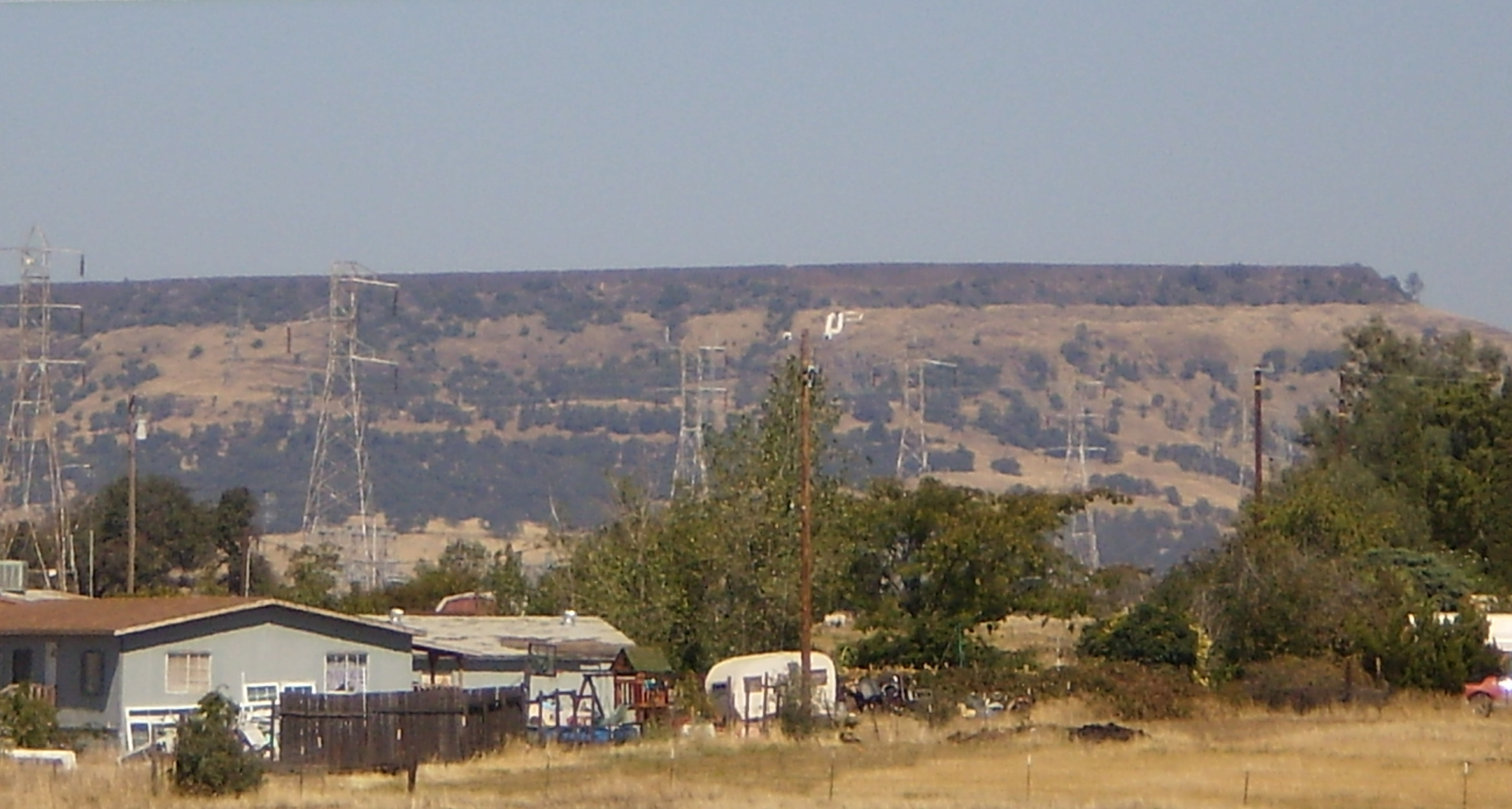
View of South Table Mountain

Las Plumas High School

The school is situated north of the small farming community of Palermo, located just south of Oroville. Both Table Mountain and the Sutter Buttes can be seen from the school, as well as the foothills of the Sierra Nevada Mountains.

The school has a large, spread-out campus that is dominated by open fields in the southern part. In the center of the campus is the quad, where most of the school's activity takes place. The quad is regularly decorated by several clubs and is maintained by many student organizations.

== History ==
=== Fight song ===
Las Plumas portables

The Las Plumas Fight song was written by art teacher Al Walsh in the Fall of 1961. About this same time, Steve Green and George Kerth, two members of the class of '65, designed the multi-colored Thunderbird that was used as the school's symbol during its early years. This symbol was painted on the band's bass drum and used in other areas. The fight song fell into disuse, until it was revived by the Associated Student Body in 2008. The class of 1998 donated the fight song board located in the gymnasium next to the scoreboard.

=== Greg Wright incident ===
A lockdown took place at the school on September 28, 2007. Student Greg Wright brought a gun to school and held a drama class hostage in the band room. The attack was not directed at the drama class, but at a rival student who was not on campus at the time. After about 2½ hours, Wright released the hostages and was taken into custody by Oroville police. The other students were taken to a church across from the school, where they were picked up by their parents. Greg Wright was charged with attempted murder and was sentenced to 22 years in prison and will have to serve 19 years before he will become eligible for parole. He will be eligible for release as early as 2027, and as late as 2029. Wright's mother, Sharlee Morton, was later also convicted of smuggling marijuana into her son's prison, allegedly Wright had been involved in selling the drug to other inmates.

== Academics ==
=== Student demographics ===
The 2014–2015 student population was broken down as follows: 4% American Indian, 10% Asian (mostly Hmong), 24% Hispanic, 1% Black, .1% Filipino, and 53% White. The ratio of males/females was 51%/49%, and the graduation rate was 89.96%. For that school year the school had 80 classroom teachers, and the ratio of teachers to students was 24:1.

=== School programs ===
The Link Crew program connects upperclassmen with freshmen students. Link Leaders help freshmen improve student study skills and beneficial academic habits. Activities including tailgate parties and movie nights help freshmen to become more involved in high school life.

The Safe School Ambassadors are students who were trained to identify potential problems on campus dealing with bullying and mistreatment. This draws from the theory and practice of restorative justice and in particular the method of peer mediators. Similarly, Conflict Managers were students students who have been trained to act as neutral third parties to help settle disputes between other students.

On Respect Days, up to 100 students are taken out of class for the day and placed together in groups of mixed races, genders, and social affiliations to promote respect for others who are different. Las Plumas High School has not observed Respect Days since the 2008 school year, but may hold more in the future.

=== Opportunities for higher education ===
Butte College offers comprehensive programs in many fields as well as a college connection program for current seniors. California State University Chico, a four-year university that offers a full spectrum of curricula, is about a 25-minute drive from the city of Oroville. Oroville is about three hours from the cultural centers of San Francisco and the Bay Area and about two hours from Reno, Tahoe and Sacramento.

== Clubs and activities ==
Las Plumas ROTC course

Twenty clubs are listed at the school's official website. Clubs included are: Action Now, Anime Club, Art Club, Asian Club, Black Student Union, CSF, Diversified Occupations, FCCLA, Friday Night Live, Gaming Club, Interact Club, Key Club, Link Crew, LP Café, LP Environmental Club, Mock Trial, The Movement/Youth Christian Club, Native American Club, SkillsUSA, and Ceramics Club.

Las Plumas High has maintained a mock trial team since 1993, and has competed at the state level for 14 years. Two students have been recognized by the Constitution Rights Foundation with outstanding achievement awards at the state level - Benjamin Rodgers for outstanding pretrial in 2005, and Gary Ferdinand for outstanding prosecution witness in 2010.

The Las Plumas/Oroville Alliance Marching Band is the biggest source of prestige for the Oroville Unified High School District, having consistently placed among the top ten bands in California while under the direction of director Jeff Stratton. In the fall of 2008, the LPO band won nine sweepstakes awards, almost breaking the record for the school. In the same school year, the band room's renovation was completed, allowing room for the hundreds of trophies and plaques accumulated over the years. Some of LPO's biggest consistent rivals include Fairfield High School, Armijo, Golden Valley, and Franklin. In the fall of 2009, the Las Plumas/Oroville Alliance marching band was named the third-best in the state by the California Band Directors Association. Normally, the band is judged by members of the Northern California Band Association.

In 1988 the Las Plumas High School Marching Band and Auxiliary represented the United States of America at the World's Fair in Brisbane, Australia under the direction of Glenn and Carolyn Dawson. The band and auxiliary toured for ten days on the eastern coast of Australia presenting student leadership and marching techniques before performing at the world's fair.

In 1990 the Las Plumas High School and Auxiliary toured the island of O'ahu performing at several schools demonstrating student leadership, marching and music techniques under the direction of Glenn and Carolyn Dawson. Within two years Glenn combined the Oroville High School music program with the Las Plumas High School music program to promote music education that included all students in the greater Oroville area.

== Athletics ==
Las Plumas track and field

Las Plumas offers sports, including football, girls' volleyball, boys' basketball, girls' basketball, girls' softball, baseball, boys' soccer, girls' soccer, wrestling, boys' and girls' track and field, boys and girls' cross country, girls' tennis, boys' tennis, and golf. The school's premiere sports are football, basketball, and baseball.
