= Oroville Hospital =

- OroHealth Corporation

Geography
- Location: 2767 Olive Highway, Oroville, California, United States
- Coordinates: 39°30′24″N 121°32′28″W

Organization
- Type: Community

Services
- Beds: 133

History
- Founded: 1962

Links
- Website: http://www.orovillehospital.com/
- Lists: Hospitals in California

Oroville Hospital provides health coverage to the City of Oroville. It is the main hospital for the city of Oroville, California. The building is the City of Oroville in Butte County. It is also a Level III trauma care center. The hospital was founded in 1962 and has grown from a modest community hospital supported by a small staff of doctors into a 133-bed acute care facility specializing in a broad range of inpatient and outpatient services, including multiple physician practices. Oroville Hospital is a private, non-profit corporation serving the Oroville area and Butte County by OroHealth Corporation.

In December 2025, Oroville Hospital filed for Chapter 11 bankruptcy protection in an effort to sell its assets.

== Services ==
Oroville Hospital offers a wide array of inpatient and outpatient services.

Outpatient services include primary care, pediatric care, dermatology, chiropractic, anticoagulation, orthopedics, rehab services, cardiology, women's imaging, urology, nephrology, women's services, and general surgery. Oroville hospital's surgical specialist team includes physicians specialized in performing thoracoscopic surgery using video-assistance, also known as VATS, nuro orphus surgery, endoscopic surgery, vascular and endovascular surgery, as well as advanced laparoscopic surgery.

Oroville Hospital's inpatient services include an intensive care unit, extended care unit, same day surgery, and an emergency service department. Oroville Hospital also has a hospitalist program. Hospitalists provide 24-hour services to patients admitted into the hospital. Their main responsibilities include admitting patients, taking care of them while they're in the hospital and then discharging them back to their primary-care doctor.
