= Sun printing =

Printing techniques

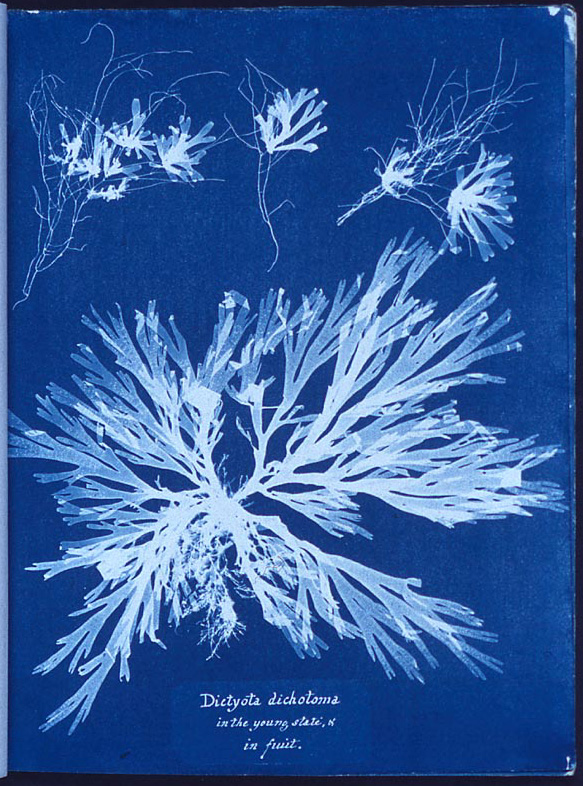
Anna Atkins algae cyanotype

Sun printing may refer to various printing techniques which use sunlight as a developing or fixative agent.

== Techniques ==
=== Cyanotype ===
Cyanotype, also referred to as "blueprinting", is the oldest non-silver photographic printing process. It was invented in 1842 by John Herschel and was long used by architects to copy their line drawings as blueprints. Between 1843 and 1853 the botanist Anna Atkins used it for Photographs of British Algae: Cyanotype Impressions, the first book to be photographically printed and illustrated; she made its plates by placing algae directly on sensitized paper and exposing the paper to sunlight. The process involves exposing materials which have been treated with a solution of potassium ferricyanide and ferric ammonium citrate to a UV light source such as the sun. Negative or positive images can be obtained by blocking UV light from reaching the sensitized material. For example, a negative image can be produced by placing a leaf upon paper treated with this solution and exposing to sunlight for 10 to 20 minutes. The paper will retain the image of the leaf after it has been rinsed with water. Once the paper dries, parts that were exposed to the sun will turn a shade of Prussian blue (ferric ferrocyanide), while parts that were covered by the leaf will remain white.

=== Light-sensitive vat dyes ===
A specialized type of vat dye called Inkodye is also used for sun-printing due to its light-sensitive quality. Unlike other vat dyes which use oxygen to develop their color, Inkodyes are developed by light. These dyes are suspended in leuco form appearing colorless until they are exposed to UV. Their usage resembles that of cyanotype, but unlike cyanotype Inkodyes are primarily used on textiles and exist in a full range of colors. Exposure times vary from 3 to 15 minutes depending on the desired color and intensity of light. Once exposed, the sensitized material is washed in soapy water to remove dye from unexposed areas. Such dyes are typically used by craftspeople, fabric printers and artists and can be printed with photographic negatives, resist paste or through a silk screen.

=== Potassium dichromate ===
Sun printing may also refer to a photographic process using potassium dichromate which produces a negative plate for conventional lithographic printing. It relies on the fact that dichromated gelatine hardens in proportion to the amount of light it receives: exposed areas become hard and resistant to moisture, while unexposed areas remain soft. Dichromated gelatine was first described by Henry Fox Talbot in 1852 for use in photogravure. The process uses a film of gelatine spread on a flat and rigid surface. This is coated with a dilute solution of potassium dichromate and dried in low light conditions. A translucent positive is secured in tight contact with the treated gelatine layer and exposed to bright sunlight for a period of up to 30 minutes. During this time the sunlight and potassium dichromate tan the gelatine exposed to light. The plate is developed by washing in warm water and removing the untanned gelatine. Once dry, a relief print is revealed on the plate. The surface can be inked and printed in a hand press to produce any number of identical prints of the original subject.
