= Oroville High School =

Location
- 1535 Bridge Street; Oroville, Butte County, California 95965; United States; 39°30′52″N 121°32′43″W

Information
- Established: 1892
- Status: Open
- School district: Oroville Union High School District
- Principal: Kristen Wiedenman
- Teaching staff: 42.84 (FTE)
- Enrollment: 870 (2023-2024)
- Student to teacher ratio: 20.31
- Colors: Purple and white
- Mascot: Tiger
- Rival: Las Plumas High School

Oroville High School is a public high school located in the rural north valley at the base of the Sierra Nevada foothills, about seventy miles north of Sacramento, California, United States. Founded in 1892, Oroville High School is the oldest high school in the district. The campus covers 4 acres (16,000 m^{2}). Of the 46 classrooms on campus, five have fully functioning computer labs. The campus also has two computer labs and a library.

In 2003, a school bond for $8,523,932 was passed, allowing for the construction of a new library, a science wing, and an industrial technology center. These funds were intended to convert older buildings on campus to an art building, a center for performing arts, and a more modern gymnasium. Despite the money set aside, all of these projects were shelved due to the extreme financial situation of the school district.

== Historic buildings ==
Oroville High School has one of the oldest buildings in the city. The original three-story building was built in 1917. The cafeteria was in the basement and the gymnasium in the middle floor. The school had an auditorium with a theater, and a shop class. Although the buildings were big, the classes were small: 20 by 20 in dimension. Altogether the school grounds covered about 16,000 feet (4,900 m).

The building was torn down because of earthquake safety concerns. Now the oldest school building is the gymnasium, which is now used as the cafeteria. Oroville High remains as the city's oldest school.

== Faculty and staff ==
Oroville High School employs 50 certificated teachers, four counselors, and 25 classified staff.

== Student demographics ==
The 2006-2007 student population was broken down as follows: 6.2% American Indian, 22.5% Asian, .7% Pacific Islander, .4% Filipino, 6.8% Hispanic, 5.5% African American, and 58% Caucasian.

== Academic ranking ==
The rating for Oroville High School, using weighted 2006 test averages as compared to other high schools in California with a range from 0 (worst) to 100 (best), is 63.

== Opportunities for higher education ==
Butte College offers comprehensive programs in many fields as well as a college connection program for current seniors. California State University Chico, a four-year university that offers a full spectrum of curricula, is about a 25-minute drive from Oroville. Oroville is about three hours from the cultural centers of San Francisco and the Bay Area, and about two hours from Reno, Tahoe and Sacramento.

== Sports ==
The school offers sports including football, volleyball, boys' and girls' basketball, softball, baseball, boys' and girls' soccer, wrestling, boys' and girls' track and field, boys' and girls' cross country, boys' and girls' tennis, golf, and boys' and girls' swimming.

Other schools in the league are about twice Oroville's size. The track, cross country and wrestling teams have recently seen at least one state-level championship participant nearly every year. In 2009 the boys' and girls' cross country teams both qualified first in their division and went to state.

== School programs ==
The link crew program connects upperclassmen with freshmen students link leaders help freshmen improve student study skills and beneficial academic habits. Activities including tailgate parties and movie nights help freshmen become more involved in high school life.

The safe school ambassadors are students trained to identify potential problems on campus dealing with bullying and mistreatment.

Conflict managers are students who have been trained to act as neutral third parties to help settle disputes between other students.

On respect days up to 100 students are taken out of class for the day and placed together in groups of mixed races, genders, and social affiliations to promote respect for others who are different.

== Notable alumni ==
- Kevin Brown, left-handed Major League Baseball pitcher who played parts of three seasons
- Jim Campbell, left-handed Major League Baseball pitcher who played one season for the Kansas City Royals
- Dave Hudgens, Major League Baseball first baseman and coach
- Jay Johnson, currenlty head coach of LSU Tigers (2022–present) and was the former head coaches Arizona (2016-2021) and Nevada (2014-2015) and the assistant coach University of San Diego (2006-2013).
- Gary Nolan, right-handed Major League Baseball pitcher who played ten seasons
- Rocky Smith, basketball player
- Arthur R. Wilson, major general during World War II
