= Humphrey's Journal of Photography =

19th-century photography periodical

Humphrey's Journal of Photography was a periodical published in New York City from 1852 to 1870. Samuel Dwight Humphrey (April 4, 1823 – 1883) was its publisher. He was a doctor. In 1865, J. H. Ladd took over as its publisher in 1859. It was one of the earliest photographic periodicals.

== History ==
Originally Humphrey's Journal of the Daguerreotype and Photographic Arts and the Sciences and Arts Pertaining to Heliography, it became Humphrey's Journal of Photography and the Heliographic Arts and Sciences in 1862, and in 1863 was renamed Humphrey's Journal of Photography and the Allied Arts and Sciences.

John Jackson Brown did a stint as its editor.

Ladd published other books on photography including John Towler's popular Silver Sunbeam.

Ladd also published The Independent, a newspaper oriented to religion. Ladd published George Barrell Cheever's God against Slavery; And the Freedom and Duty of the Pulpit to Rebuke It, as a Sin against God in 1857.

Humphrey was a portrait photographer. In 1849, he made a multiple exposure daguerreotype of the moon, a daguerreotype that is at the Met. Humphrey also published books on daguerreotypes.
