= Oroville, California =

City in California, United States

- City
- City of Oroville
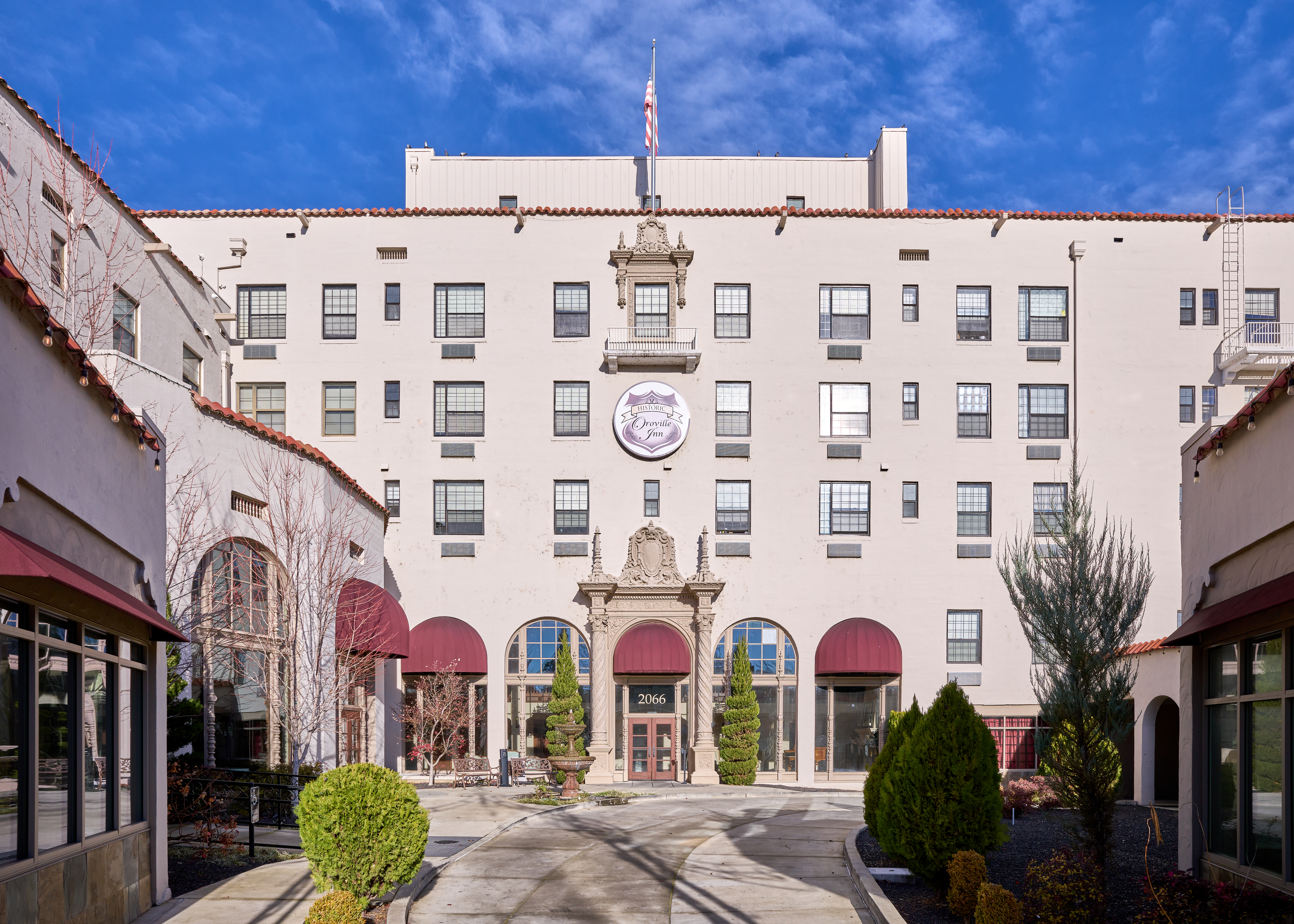
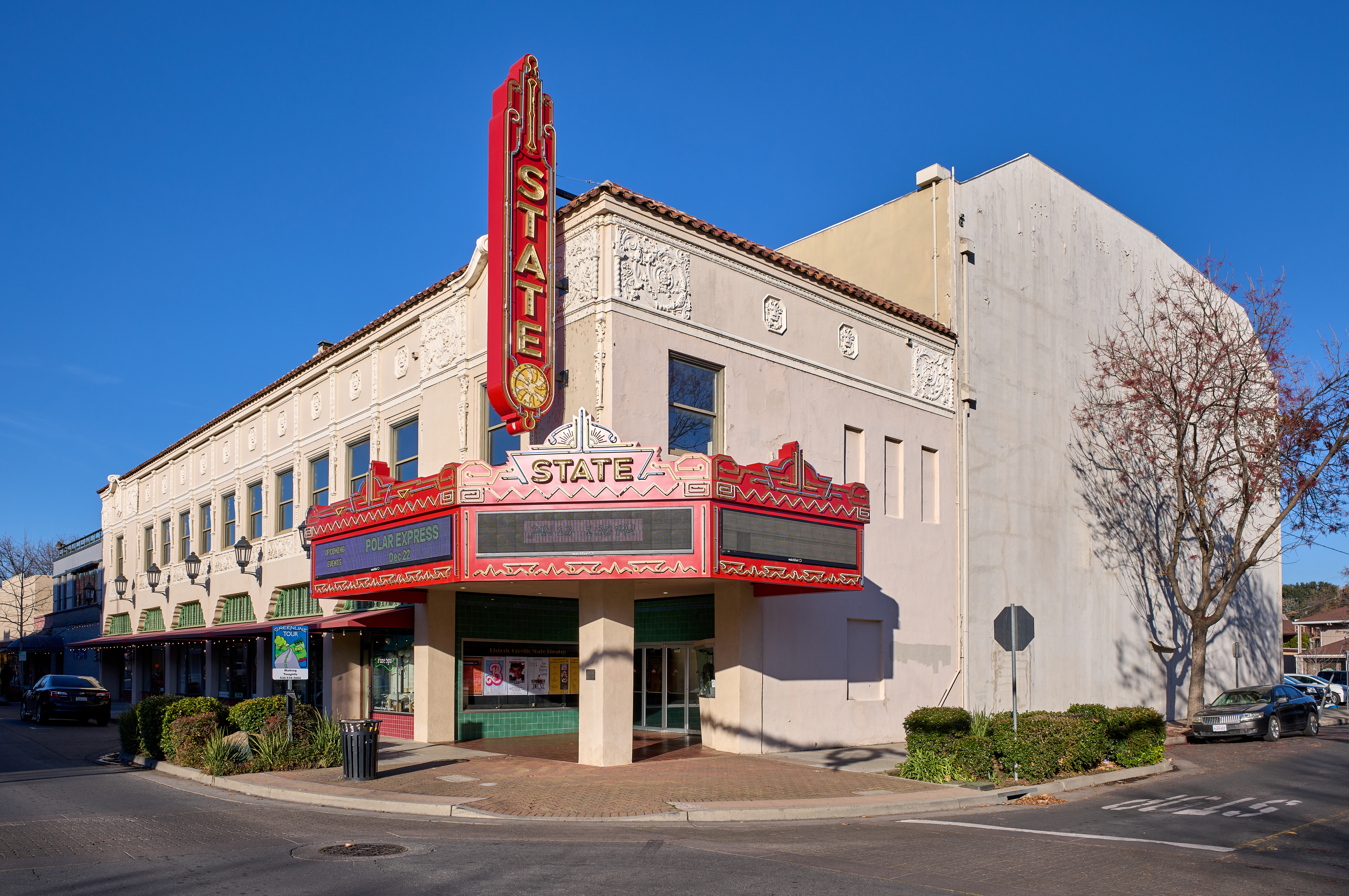
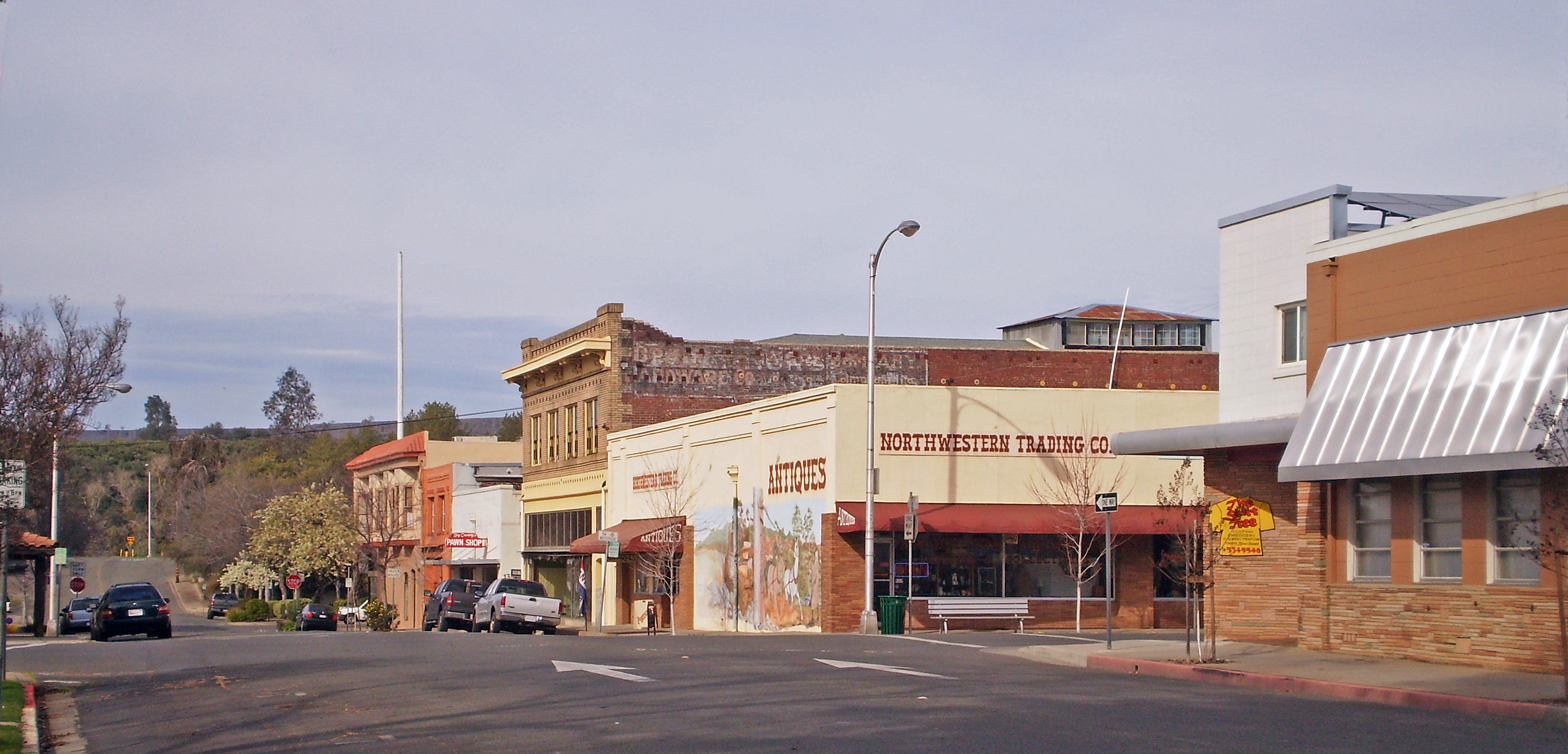
- Oroville Inn State Theatre Downtown

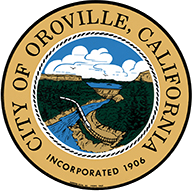
- Seal
- Nickname: "City of Gold"
- Interactive map of Oroville, California
- Location in the contiguous United States
- Coordinates: 39°30′49″N 121°33′24″W
- Country: United States
- State: California
- County: Butte
- Incorporated: January 3, 1906

Government
  - City Council: Mayor: David Pittman; Vice Mayor: Eric Smith; Tracy Johnstone; Janet Goodson; Scott Thomson; Shawn Webber; Chuck Reynolds
  - State Senator: Megan Dahle (R)
  - State Assembly: Vacant
  - U.S. Congress: James Gallagher (R)

Area
  - City: 13.85 sq mi (35.88 km^{2})
  - Land: 13.83 sq mi (35.83 km^{2})
  - Water: 0.019 sq mi (0.05 km^{2}) 0.13%
- Elevation: 167 ft (51 m)

Population (2020)
  - City: 20,042
  - Density: 1,448.7/sq mi (559.36/km^{2})
  - Urban: 40,190
- Time zone: UTC-8 (PST)
  - Summer (DST): UTC-7 (PDT)
- ZIP Codes: 95940, 95965, 95966
- Area codes: 530, 837
- FIPS code: 06-54386
- Website: www.orovilleca.gov

Oroville (Oro, Spanish for "Gold" and Ville, French for "town") is a city in and the county seat of Butte County of the U.S. state of California. As of the 2020 census, Oroville had a population of 20,042. After the 2018 Camp Fire that destroyed much of the town of Paradise, Oroville's population increased as many people who lost their homes moved there.

Oroville is considered the gateway to Lake Oroville and Feather River recreational areas. The Berry Creek Rancheria of Maidu Indians of California is headquartered in Oroville.

Oroville is adjacent to State Route 70 and in close proximity to State Route 99, which connects Butte County with Interstate 5. The city of Chico is about 23 miles (37 kilometers) northwest of the city, and the state capital, Sacramento, around 70 miles (110 kilometers) to the south.

Oroville's nickname is the "City of Gold", which is essentially the Spanish name of the city in English. The National Arbor Day Foundation has declared Oroville a Tree City USA for 41 years.

== History ==
Oroville is on the banks of the Feather River, which flows from the Sierra Nevada onto the flat floor of the California Central Valley. During the California Gold Rush, it was created as the Feather River's head of navigation to serve miners. The original inhabitants of Oroville were the Konkow subdivision of Maidu people. In their native language, the Oroville area is ʔópamtani.

The town was originally named "Ophir City", but was renamed Oroville when the first post office opened in 1854 (oro is Spanish for "gold"). The City of Oroville was incorporated on January 3, 1906.

Gold was found at Bidwell Bar, one of California's first gold-mining sites, bringing thousands of prospectors to the Oroville area. Now inundated by the waters of enormous Lake Oroville, which was filled in 1968, Bidwell Bar is memorialized by the Bidwell Bar Bridge, an original remnant of the area and the first suspension bridge in California (California Historical Landmark #314). The Western Pacific Railroad built the all-weather Feather River Canyon route across the Sierra Nevada in the early 20th century, earning it the moniker "The Feather River Route". The California Zephyr made frequent stops at Oroville station during its 20-year existence. This was included on the Union Pacific Railroad's Feather River Canyon Subdivision in 1983. State Route 70, a significant thoroughfare, runs almost parallel to the train line that winds through the canyon.

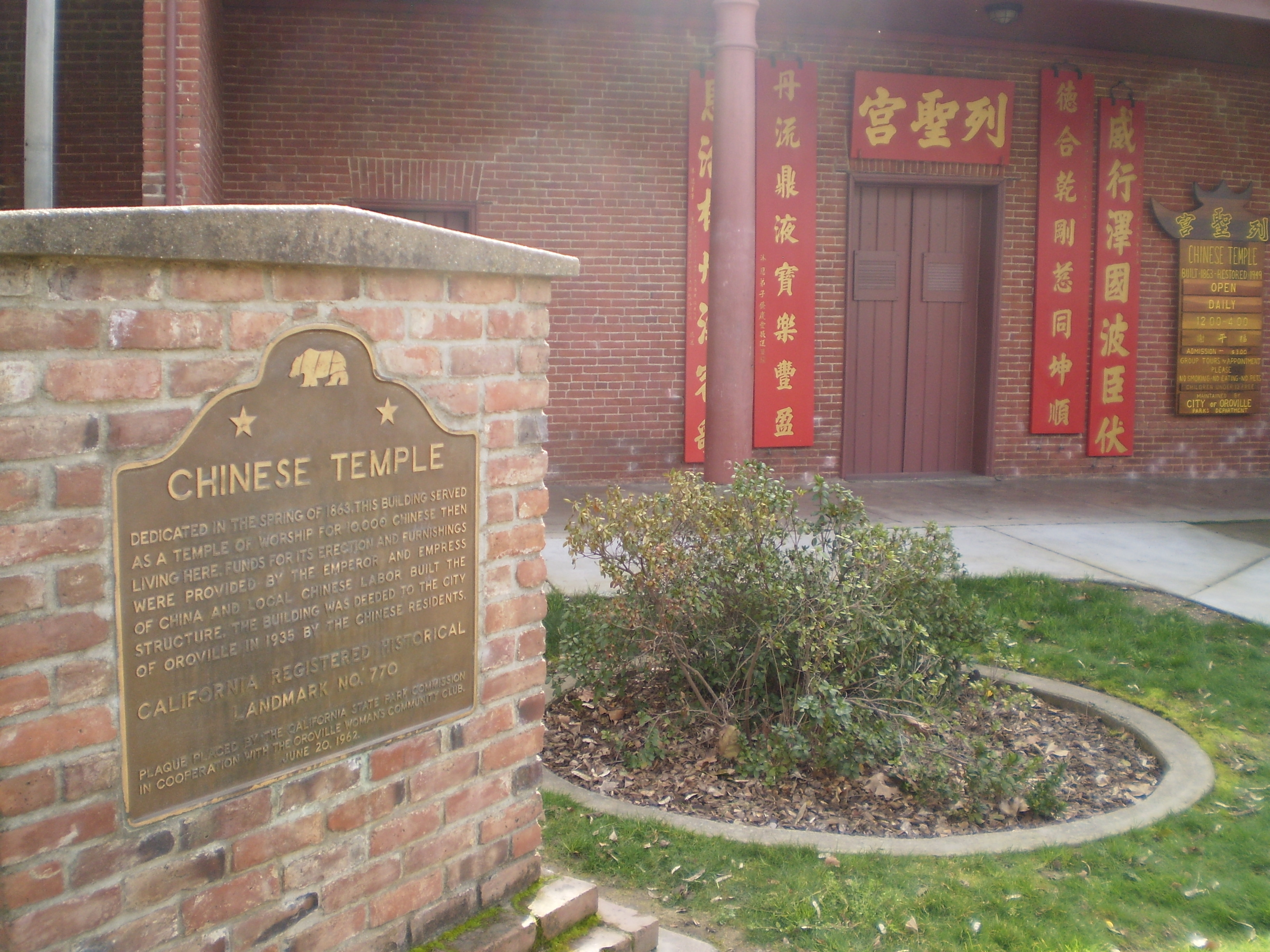
Oroville Chinese Temple

The Chinese Temple (CHL No. 770 and listed on the National Register of Historic Places) was built in 1863 to cater to the biggest Chinese colony north of Sacramento. Chinese laborers established the Temple as a place of worship for followers of Chinese folk religion and the three major Chinese religions: Taoism, Buddhism, and Confucianism. It has a large collection of antiques as well as a garden.

The olive-canning industry was founded in Oroville by Freda Ehmann, credited as the "mother of the California ripe olive industry". She built a large cannery in Oroville and by 1900 was the president of the world's largest canned olive factory. Ehmann was a believer in women's suffrage and a friend of Susan B. Anthony.

Ishi, Oroville's most famous resident, was the last of the Yahi people and is considered the last "Stone Age" Indian to come out of the wilderness and into Western civilization. When he appeared out of the hills in East Oroville in 1911, he was immediately thrust into the national spotlight. The Visitor Center at Lake Oroville has a thorough exhibit and documentary film on Ishi and his life in society.

Archaeological finds place the northwestern border for the prehistoric Martis people in the Oroville area.

=== 1881 lynching ===
On August 7, 1881, pioneer Jack Crum was allegedly stomped to death by local bully Tom Noacks in Chico, California. The young Noacks was feared by the locals of Butte County, not only because of his size and strength, but allegedly because he was mentally unbalanced and enjoyed punching oxen in the head.

Noacks was arrested and jailed in the Chico jail. Once word got out that the old pioneer had been murdered, the authorities moved Noacks to the Butte County county jail in Oroville for his safety. Crum's friends, knowing that Noacks was in the county jail, made their way to Oroville with rope in hand. Knocking on the jail door, the men told the jailer that they had a prisoner from the town of Biggs, California. Once inside the jail, they overpowered the jailer and dragged Noacks from his cell. They took Noacks to Crum's former farm and hanged him from an old cottonwood tree. Nobody was ever prosecuted for the lynching.

=== Hate groups ===
Hate groups began appearing in Oroville media stories beginning in 1976 with a neo-Nazi husband and wife couple killed in a shootout. In 1980, members of the American Nazi Party moved to Oroville from Tracy, California, to re-organize as Chico Area National Socialists. In September 1982, 17-year-old Joseph Hoover was murdered by his Nazi colleagues after he told police he helped spread anti-Black hate literature at Oroville High School. One thousand people marched in Oroville in protest of Nazi and Ku Klux Klan activity on December 11, 1982. Local Nazi leader Perry "Red" Warthan was convicted of Hoover's murder and sentenced to 27 years, and two more male high school–age Nazi recruits were convicted as accessories to murder. In 2016, an Oroville man was found spreading Nazi hate messages in Sacramento. In January 2004, a white power publication was distributed in the Kelly Ridge area east of Oroville.

=== Oroville Dam crisis ===
On February 7, 2017, after heavy rains, a defect formed in a spillway of Oroville Dam. For the first time since its construction, the secondary spillway was overtopped on February 11. Shortly after being put into service, this structure began to show signs of being undermined, raising fears of catastrophic failure. Owing to their inability to predict the continued safety of this spillway, the Butte County Sheriff ordered evacuations of downstream residents from Butte, Sutter, and Yuba counties.

=== COVID-19 ===
In November 2021, citing alleged federal and state overreach during the COVID-19 pandemic, the Oroville city council passed a resolution declaring the city as its own "Constitutional Republic" and refused to enforce federal orders that it said violated its citizens' rights.

The resolution to declare the town a constitutional republic was an attempt to limit state and federal restrictions related to the COVID-19 pandemic in California. One rural law expert stated that the designation was unclear and would not operate to shield the city from following state and federal laws.

== Geography ==
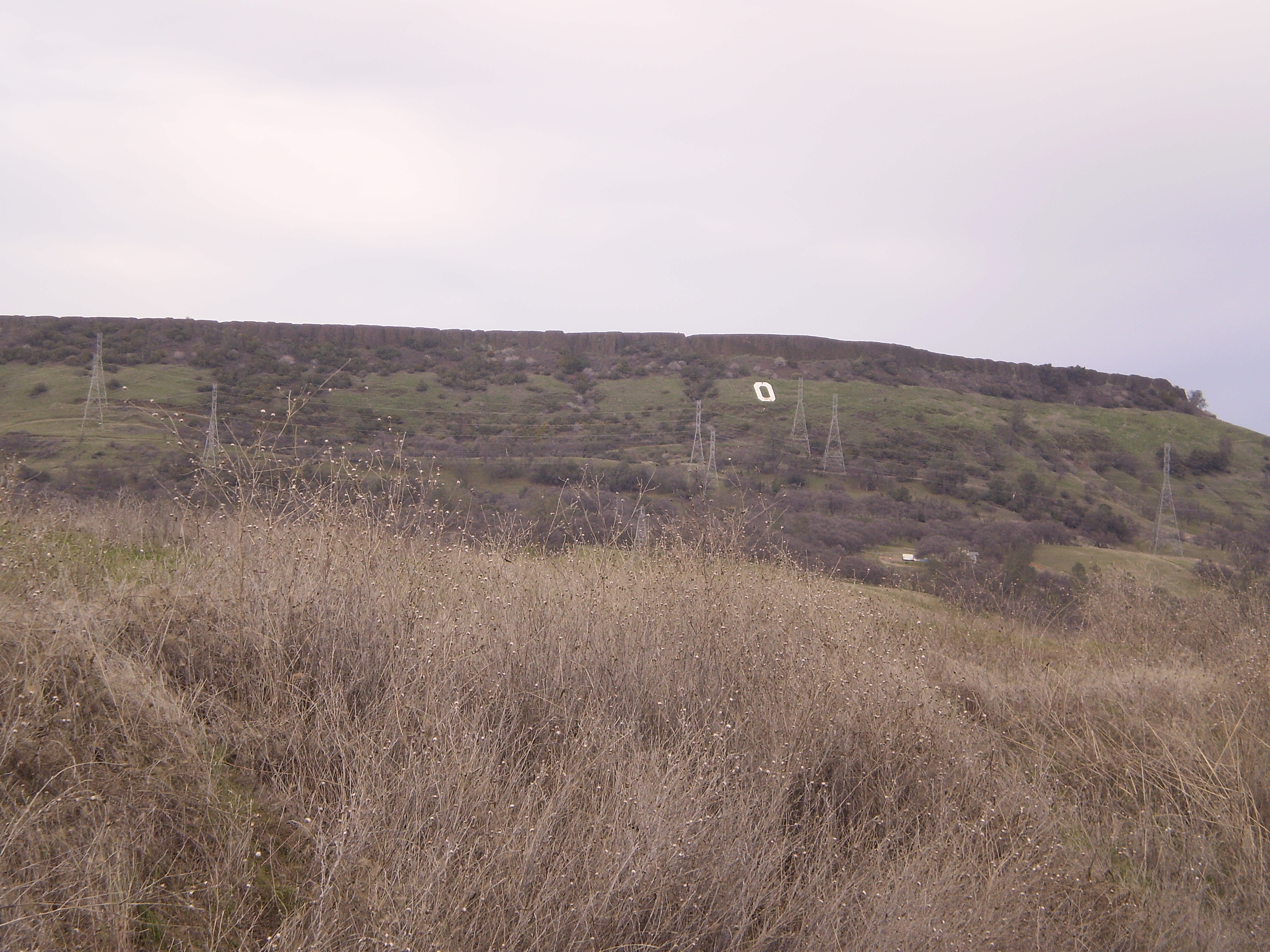
Table Mountain near Oroville.

According to the United States Census Bureau, the city has a land area of 13.83 square miles (35.8 km^{2}).

Oroville is situated at the head of navigation on the Feather River. The Yuba River flows into the Feather River near Marysville and these flow together to the Sacramento River. Geologically, Oroville is situated at the meeting place of three provinces: the Central Valley alluvial plain to the west, the crystalline Sierra Nevada to the southeast and the volcanic Cascade Mountains to the north. It has a Mediterranean climate.

Oroville sits on the eastern rim of the Great Valley, defined today by the floodplains of the Sacramento River and its tributaries. Around Oroville these sediments are dominated by thick fans of Feather River sediments, but just east of this there is a thin, north-south band of late Cretaceous sediments. These sit atop the Sierran basement, which beneath eastern Oroville comprises greenschist-facies metavolcanic rocks of Jurassic age, giving way to granites of the Sierra batholith to the east. These are manifestations of a vigorous island arc sequence, built out over an east-dipping subduction zone of mid-to-late Mesozoic age. The gold veins lace this ancient arc, remobilized by Mesozoic shearing and intrusions of igneous rock. The crystalline foothills are locally overlain by a Cenozoic sequence of Eocene clean beach sands overlain by Neogene volcanics, including the Diamond Head-like profile of "Table Mountain".

=== Climate ===
According to the Köppen Climate Classification system, Oroville has a hot-summer Mediterranean climate, abbreviated "Csa" on climate maps.

According to US climate data, on the average Oroville receives 30.7 inches (780 mm) of precipitation per year, which is about 20% less than the national average, but somewhat higher than the average California rainfall total.

Climate data for Oroville, California (Oroville Municipal Airport), 1991–2020 normals, extremes 1998–present
Month	Jan	Feb	Mar	Apr	May	Jun	Jul	Aug	Sep	Oct	Nov	Dec	Year
Record high °F (°C)	83 (28)	86 (30)	97 (36)	98 (37)	107 (42)	116 (47)	115 (46)	115 (46)	115 (46)	105 (41)	90 (32)	84 (29)	116 (47)
Mean maximum °F (°C)	67.5 (19.7)	72.5 (22.5)	77.9 (25.5)	89.3 (31.8)	96.1 (35.6)	104.8 (40.4)	107.0 (41.7)	104.0 (40.0)	101.1 (38.4)	92.5 (33.6)	77.2 (25.1)	67.5 (19.7)	107.7 (42.1)
Mean daily maximum °F (°C)	55.2 (12.9)	60.5 (15.8)	66.0 (18.9)	72.3 (22.4)	81.1 (27.3)	89.7 (32.1)	95.8 (35.4)	94.1 (34.5)	88.6 (31.4)	78.4 (25.8)	63.7 (17.6)	55.2 (12.9)	75.1 (23.9)
Daily mean °F (°C)	46.9 (8.3)	51.0 (10.6)	55.1 (12.8)	59.9 (15.5)	67.5 (19.7)	74.4 (23.6)	79.5 (26.4)	77.8 (25.4)	73.0 (22.8)	65.1 (18.4)	53.4 (11.9)	46.9 (8.3)	62.5 (17.0)
Mean daily minimum °F (°C)	38.7 (3.7)	41.4 (5.2)	44.2 (6.8)	47.5 (8.6)	53.9 (12.2)	59.1 (15.1)	63.2 (17.3)	61.5 (16.4)	57.4 (14.1)	51.7 (10.9)	43.1 (6.2)	38.6 (3.7)	50.0 (10.0)
Mean minimum °F (°C)	29.1 (−1.6)	32.1 (0.1)	34.3 (1.3)	37.8 (3.2)	43.7 (6.5)	49.9 (9.9)	52.7 (11.5)	52.0 (11.1)	48.3 (9.1)	40.8 (4.9)	32.6 (0.3)	28.9 (−1.7)	27.3 (−2.6)
Record low °F (°C)	15 (−9)	21 (−6)	25 (−4)	29 (−2)	30 (−1)	35 (2)	43 (6)	35 (2)	36 (2)	29 (−2)	22 (−6)	12 (−11)	12 (−11)
Average precipitation inches (mm)	5.20 (132)	4.79 (122)	3.33 (85)	1.80 (46)	1.05 (27)	0.32 (8.1)	0.04 (1.0)	0.04 (1.0)	0.16 (4.1)	1.44 (37)	2.87 (73)	4.63 (118)	25.67 (654.2)
Average precipitation days (≥ 0.01 in)	12.2	10.4	10.0	6.6	4.5	1.5	0.2	0.5	1.1	4.4	9.5	11.8	72.7
Source 1: NOAA
Source 2: National Weather Service (mean maxima/minima 2006–2020)

== Demographics ==
Historical population
Census	Pop.	Note	%±
1860	2,429		—
1870	1,425		−41.3%
1880	1,743		22.3%
1890	1,787		2.5%
1910	3,859		—
1920	3,340		−13.4%
1930	3,698		10.7%
1940	4,421		19.6%
1950	5,387		21.9%
1960	6,115		13.5%
1970	7,536		23.2%
1980	8,683		15.2%
1990	11,960		37.7%
2000	13,004		8.7%
2010	15,546		19.5%
2020	20,042		28.9%
U.S. Decennial Census

=== 2020 census ===
As of the 2020 census, Oroville had a population of 20,042. The population density was 1,448.7 inhabitants per square mile (559.3/km^{2}). The median age was 34.7 years. 25.7% of residents were under the age of 18 and 15.4% were 65 years of age or older. For every 100 females, there were 98.4 males, and for every 100 females age 18 and over there were 97.4 males age 18 and over.

The census reported that 95.1% of the population lived in households, 1.6% lived in non-institutionalized group quarters, and 3.3% were institutionalized. 99.0% of residents lived in urban areas, while 1.0% lived in rural areas.

There were 7,161 households, of which 35.8% had children under the age of 18 living in them. Of all households, 33.1% were married-couple households, 10.9% were cohabiting couple households, 20.4% had a male householder with no spouse or partner present, and 35.6% had a female householder with no spouse or partner present. About 28.9% of all households were made up of individuals and 13.2% had someone living alone who was 65 years of age or older. The average household size was 2.66, and there were 4,488 families (62.7% of all households).

There were 7,705 housing units at an average density of 557.0 units per square mile (215.1 units/km^{2}). Of these, 7,161 (92.9%) were occupied and 544 (7.1%) were vacant. Of occupied units, 44.2% were owner-occupied and 55.8% were renter-occupied. The homeowner vacancy rate was 1.9%, and the rental vacancy rate was 4.5%.

Racial composition as of the 2020 census
Race	Number	Percent
White	12,608	62.9%
Black or African American	749	3.7%
American Indian and Alaska Native	698	3.5%
Asian	1,956	9.8%
Native Hawaiian and Other Pacific Islander	58	0.3%
Some other race	1,334	6.7%
Two or more races	2,639	13.2%
Hispanic or Latino (of any race)	3,267	16.3%

=== 2023 ACS estimates ===
In 2023, the US Census Bureau estimated that 8.4% of the population were foreign-born. Of all people aged 5 or older, 82.1% spoke only English at home, 8.4% spoke Spanish, 1.2% spoke other Indo-European languages, 7.8% spoke Asian or Pacific Islander languages, and 0.5% spoke other languages. Of those aged 25 or older, 83.0% were high school graduates and 13.0% had a bachelor's degree.

The median household income in 2023 was $51,893, and the per capita income was $25,124. About 13.1% of families and 21.8% of the population were below the poverty line.

=== 2010 census ===
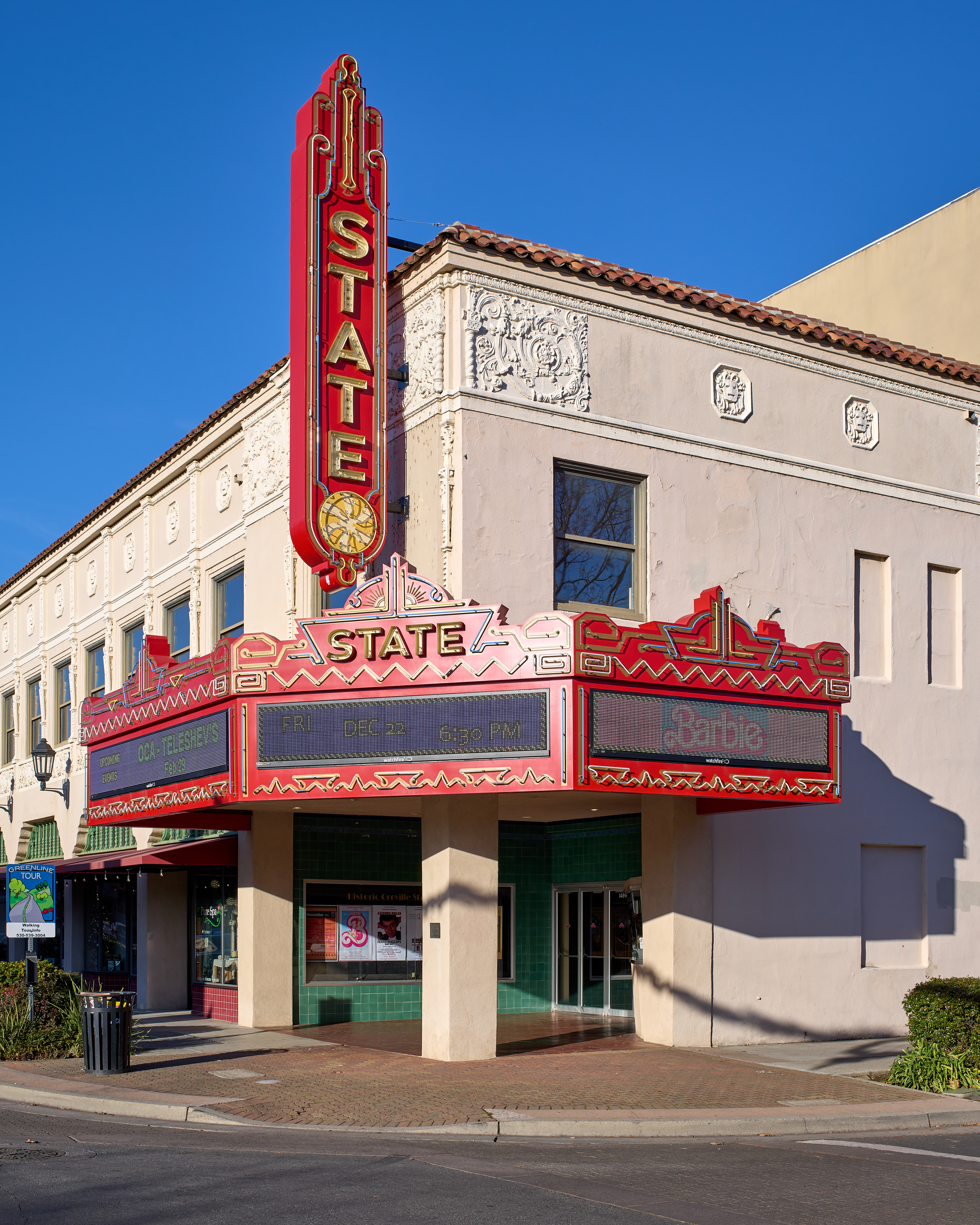
The Spanish Colonial Revival style State Theatre

As of the 2010 United States census, Oroville had a population of 15,546. The racial makeup was 11,686 (75.2%) White, 453 (2.9%) African American, 573 (3.7%) Native American, 1,238 (8.0%) Asian, 56 (0.4%) Pacific Islander, 554 (3.6%) from other races, and 986 (6.3%) from two or more races. Hispanic or Latino of any race were 1,945 persons (12.5%).

The Census reported that 14,662 people (94.3% of the population) lived in households, 72 (0.5%) lived in non-institutionalized group quarters, and 812 (5.2%) were institutionalized.

There were 5,646 households, out of which 2,126 (37.7%) had children under the age of 18 living in them, 1,893 (33.5%) were opposite-sex married couples living together, 1,174 (20.8%) had a female householder with no husband present, 430 (7.6%) had a male householder with no wife present. There were 615 (10.9%) unmarried opposite-sex partnerships, and 33 (0.6%) same-sex married couples or partnerships. 1,699 households (30.1%) were made up of individuals, and 718 (12.7%) had someone living alone who was 65 years of age or older. The average household size was 2.60. There were 3,497 families (61.9% of all households); the average family size was 3.22.

The population was spread out, with 4,267 people (27.4%) under the age of 18, 1,969 people (12.7%) aged 18 to 24, 3,940 people (25.3%) aged 25 to 44, 3,417 people (22.0%) aged 45 to 64, and 1,953 people (12.6%) who were 65 years of age or older. The median age was 31.5 years. For every 100 females, there were 93.7 males. For every 100 females age 18 and over, there were 91.8 males.

There were 6,194 housing units at an average density of 476.0 units per square mile (183.8 units/km^{2}), of which 5,646 were occupied, of which 2,423 (42.9%) were owner-occupied, and 3,223 (57.1%) were occupied by renters. The homeowner vacancy rate was 3.6%; the rental vacancy rate was 8.4%. 6,293 people (40.5% of the population) lived in owner-occupied housing units and 8,369 people (53.8%) lived in rental housing units.

Oroville is home to a considerable number of ethnic Hmong. The Hmong migrated from Southeast Asia, especially from the country Laos, after the Vietnam War. The Hmong were allies of the American forces during the Vietnam War, many were recruited to help fight the Communist-aligned North Vietnamese forces in Laos and Vietnam. The Hmong people were given blanket political asylum after the fall of Saigon to the NVA in 1975. Every year there is an annual festival during autumn which was originally a harvest festival but now called the New Year celebration. In 2010, 773 people of Hmong descent lived in the city of Oroville, 726 in South Oroville, 640 in Thermalito, and 140 in Oroville East. In 2010, the Oroville/Chico Hmong community was the 9th largest in the Western US.

In the 1950s, a community of Romanians migrated from Europe, with 560 remaining at the time of the 2010 census.

Native Americans made up 3.7% of Oroville's population in 2010. The largest tribal group is the local Maidu. The Berry Creek Rancheria of Maidu Indians of California is headquartered in Oroville, with 306 members. The world's largest museum of Maidu culture is located in Oroville East, at the Lookout Museum.

== Economy ==
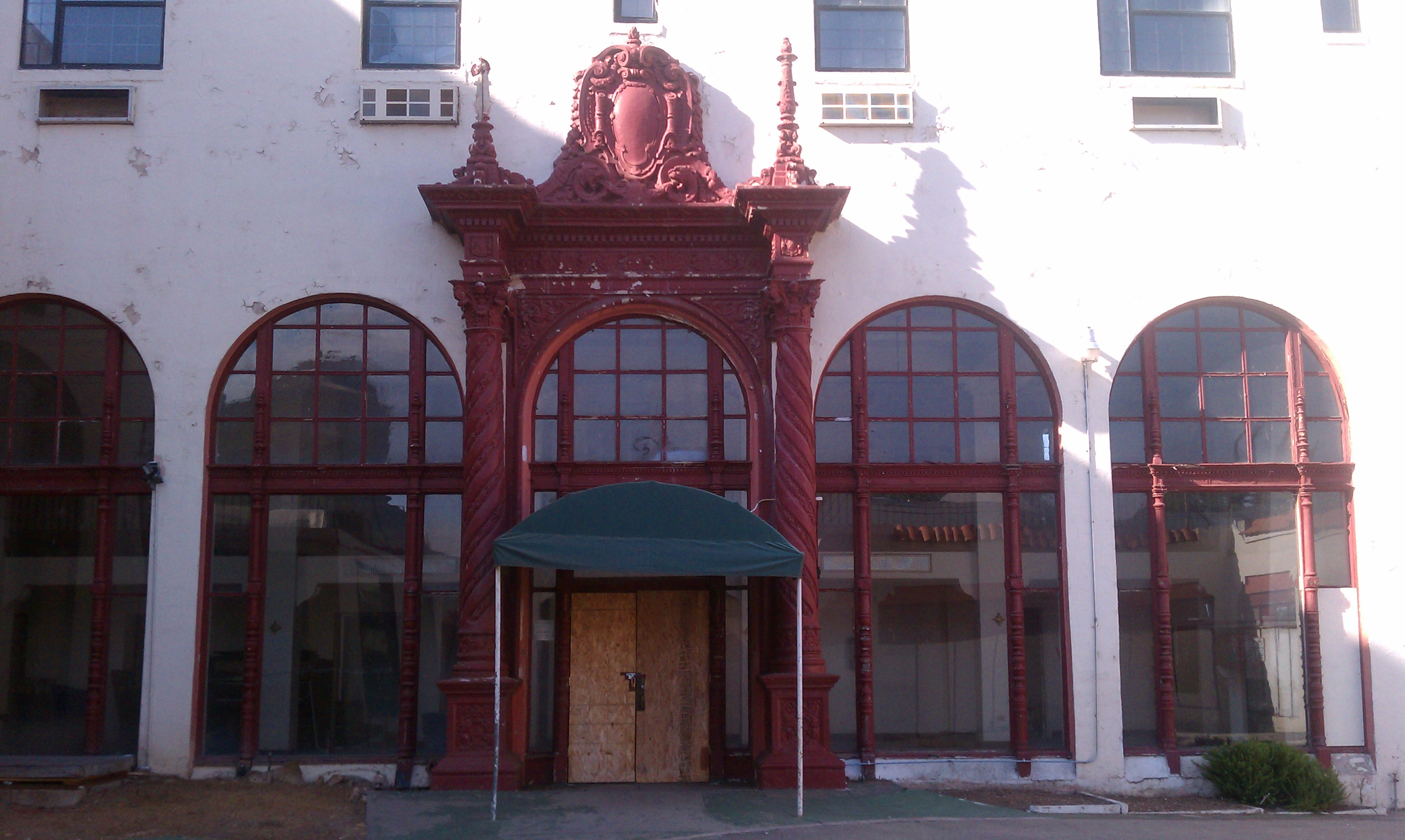
The historic Spanish Colonial Revival style Oroville Inn

The economy of Oroville is largely driven by tourism to Lake Oroville and the Feather River recreation areas. The largest industries in Oroville as of 2017 are: Healthcare and Social Assistance (20%), Retail Trade (11%), and Accommodation and Food Service (10%).

As the neighboring city of Chico experiences growth in retail, education, and technology industries, Oroville has experienced population growth associated with commuters attracted to lower property costs, and a smaller cost of living. Recently, Oroville has seen an increase in economic development. Oroville Hospital announced in 2018 a hospital expansion, and in 2019 received $200 million in bonds for a five-story hospital tower expected to be competed in 2022.

=== Top employers ===
According to the city's 2020–2021 Annual Comprehensive Financial Report, the top employers in the city are:

#	Employer	# of Employees
1	County of Butte	2,320
2	Oroville Medical Complex	1,650
3	Pacific Coast Producers	992
4	Walmart Stores, Inc.	289
5	Graphic Packaging International	205
5	Walmart Stores, Inc.	234
6	Ammunition Accessories	158
7	Sierra Pacific Industries	128
8	Home Depot	126
9	City of Oroville	111
10	Roplast Industries, Inc	93
11	Currier Square Spe LLC	67

=== Tourism ===
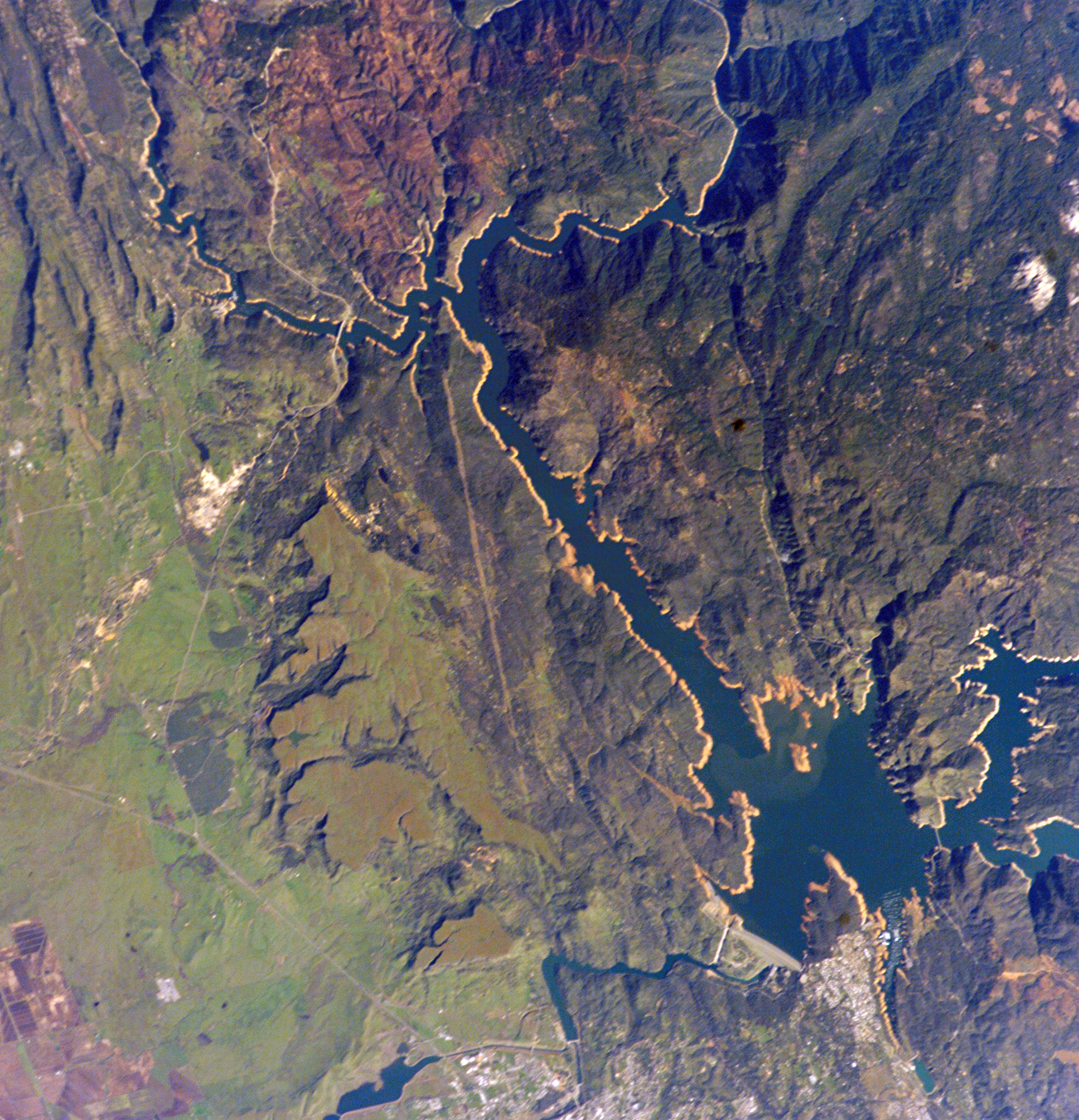
Lake Oroville in the foothills of the Sierra Nevada mountains

- The Oroville Dam is the tallest dam in the United States and one of the 20 largest dams in the world. At 770 feet (230 m) tall and 6,920 feet (2,110 m) long, it impounds Lake Oroville, which has a capacity of 3,500,000 acre⋅ft (4,300 million m^{3}) of water, making it the second-largest reservoir in California.
- Lake Oroville is a man-made lake that was formed by the Oroville Dam. At 900 feet (270 m) when full, the lake has a surface of 15,500 acres (6,300 ha) for recreation and 167 miles (269 km) of shoreline. Lake Oroville features an abundance of camping, picnicking, horseback riding, hiking, sail and power boating, water-skiing, fishing, swimming, boat-in camping, floating campsites, and horse camping.
- Lake Oroville Visitor Center is located in Kelly Ridge and overlooks the Oroville Dam and Lake Oroville. The visitor center is home to a museum with interpretive displays, the history of the dam and the State Water Project. A 47-foot (14 m) viewing tower allows the visitor the opportunity to have a panoramic view of the lake and surrounding areas.
- Mother Orange Tree, located in Oroville, is the oldest of all Northern California orange trees.
- The Feather River Fish Hatchery raise Chinook salmon and steelhead along the Feather River. The annual Oroville Salmon Festival is held on the fourth Saturday of September at both the Hatchery and downtown Oroville.
- Riverbend Park is a 210-acre (85 ha) park on the Feather River established in 2006. The river features boat access and fishing. Other available activities include disc golf, running and walking trails, a river beach, and water fountains to play in on hot days.
- Brad Freeman Bike Trail – a 41-mile (66 km) bicycle trail running along the Feather River up to the dam, down through the city then out to the Thermalito Forebay and Thermalito Afterbay.
- Oroville Chinese Temple – built in 1863 by members of the Chinese Popular Religion.

The Oroville Municipal Airport is located south of State Route 162 west of State Route 70.

== Parks and recreation ==
Oroville has several parks featuring playgrounds, picnic tables and benches.

=== Parks and trails ===
==== Parks ====
- Riverbend Park
- Bedrock Park
- The C.F. Lott Home in Sank Park – A Victorian revival home built in 1856 by "Judge" Lott. Sank Park, a lush shaded garden with a gazebo, encompasses an entire city block that Judge Lott bought in 1855 for $200
- Hammon Park
- Hewitt Park
- Rotary Park
- Martin Luther King Jr. Park
- Playtown USA Park
- Gary Nolan Baseball Complex (Mitchell Field)
- Nelson Sports Complex
- Centennial Park

==== Trails ====
- Feather River Bike Trail
- Brad Freeman Trail
- Dan Beebe Trail
- North Table Mountain Ecological Reserve
- Kelly Ridge Recreation Area

== Education ==
Most of Oroville is in the Oroville City Elementary School District. Portions extend into Thermalito Union School District and Palermo Union School District. All of Oroville is in the Oroville Union High School District.

The high school district includes two traditional high schools, Las Plumas High School and Oroville High School, and Prospect High School, a continuation/remedial high school. The city also has an adult school, Oroville Adult School.

Several small, rural school districts are in the surrounding areas.

=== Oroville City Elementary School District ===
==== Elementary schools ====
- Oakdale Heights Elementary
- Ophir Elementary
- Stanford Avenue Elementary
- Wyandotte Academy
- STREAM Charter School
- Helen Wilcox Elementary School
- Golden Hills Elementary

==== Middle schools ====
- Central Middle School
- Ishi Hills Middle School
- Palermo Middle School
- Nelson Ave Middle School

=== Oroville Union High School District ===
==== High schools ====
- Oroville High School
- Las Plumas High School
- Prospect High School

=== Higher education ===
- Oroville Adult School
- California State University, Chico (in Chico, 24 miles (39 km) northwest of Oroville)
- Butte Community College
- Northwest Lineman College

== Media ==
=== Radio ===
Oroville is home to KOYO-LP, a low-power community radio station owned and operated by the Bird Street Arbor Day Media Project. The station was built by numerous volunteers from Oroville and around the region in April 2002 at the second Prometheus Radio Project barnraising. KOYO-LP broadcasts music, news, and public affairs to listeners at 107.1FM.

=== Print ===
The Oroville Mercury-Register is a newspaper published in the city and dates back to 1873. Its owned by MediaNews Group.

== Transportation ==
=== Rail ===
The Amtrak Thruway 3 provides thrice daily connections from Oroville (with a curbside stop at 2525 Feather River Blvd) to/from Sacramento and Stockton

=== Roads ===
State Route 70 runs north–south on the west of the main part of Oroville. The road has an overpass over the Feather River in the city. State Route 162 runs through east–west of the city.

== Infrastructure ==
=== Hospital ===
Oroville Hospital is a general acute care hospital and offers basic emergency care located in the City of Oroville.

=== Fire department ===
The Oroville Fire Department is responsible for calls within the city jurisdiction of approximately 13 square miles (34 km^{2}) with a population of 16,260 (as of 2015).

=== Superfund sites ===
Oroville has three designated superfund cleanup sites, two of which have been cleaned up and delisted: a Koppers Co. wood treatment plant, a Louisiana Pacific sawmill, and the Western Pacific railyard.

The Koppers Co. plant was listed on September 21, 1984, for pentachlorophenol (PCP), dioxin, furans, polycyclic aromatic hydrocarbons (PAHs), and heavy metals (copper, chromium, and arsenic) contamination due to chemicals spilled on unpaved areas.

The Louisiana-Pacific sawmill was listed on June 10, 1986, for pentachlorophenol (PCP), dioxin, furan, heavy metal (arsenic, boron, and copper), and polycyclic aromatic hydrocarbon (PAH) contamination. Following remediation, the site was delisted on November 21, 1996. The sawmill was shut down in 2001.

The Western Pacific Railroad yard was listed on August 30, 1990, for volatile organic compound (VOC) and heavy metals (arsenic, lead, and chromium) contamination. Following remediation, the site was delisted on August 29, 2001.

== Notable people ==
- Isaac Austin, professional basketball player
- Kevin Brown, professional baseball player for Milwaukee Brewers in early 1990s
- Ishi, last surviving member of Yahi Native American Tribe
- Hartford H Keifer (1902–1986), authority on eriophyid mites
- Edward Abraham Kusel, photographer
- Doug LaMalfa (1960–2026), U.S. Representative of California's 1st congressional district
- Marilyn Nash, actress and casting director
- Gary Nolan, professional baseball player
- Rebecca Sonnenshine, Emmy nominated screenwriter of The Boys
- John Spence, first American combat frogman
- Adolphus Frederic St. Sure, federal judge
- Kendall Thomas, Nash Professor of Law and a co-founder of the Center for the Study of Law and Culture at Columbia Law School
- Frank Tuttle, contemporary Native American artist
- Robert H. Young, Korean War Medal of Honor recipient
- Hubert Zemke, pilot

== In popular culture ==
In the early 1970s, the movie The Klansman was filmed in Oroville.

== Sister cities ==
- – Salem, Massachusetts (United States) 2007
