= Cherokee, California =

- Unincorporated community
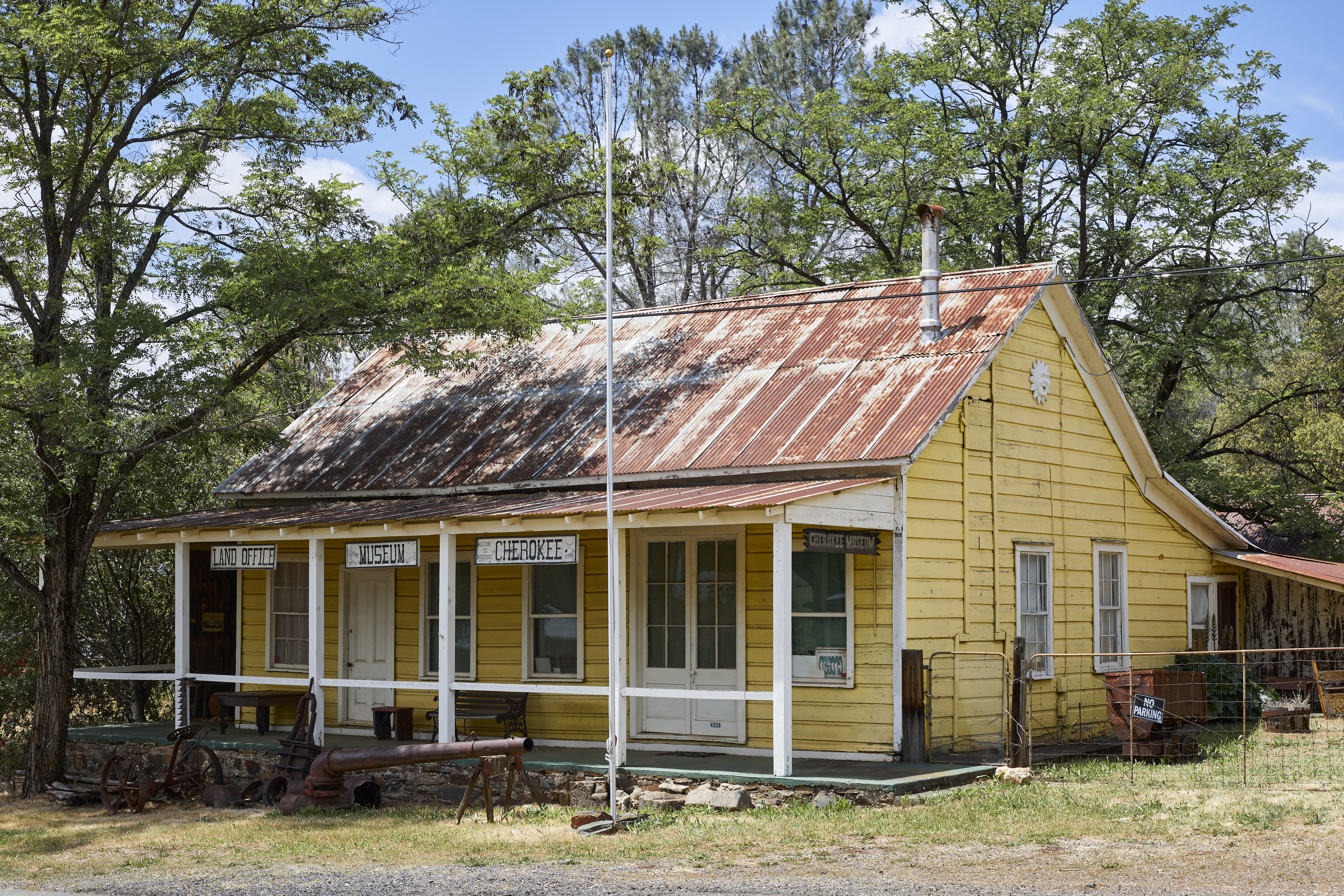
- The Cherokee Museum

- Location of Cherokee in Butte County, California.

- Location in California
- Coordinates: 39°38′47″N 121°32′18″W
- Country: United States
- State: California
- County: Butte

Area
  - Total: 1.921 sq mi (4.976 km^{2})
  - Land: 1.751 sq mi (4.534 km^{2})
  - Water: 0.171 sq mi (0.442 km^{2}) 8.9%
- Elevation: 1,306 ft (398 m)

Population (2020)
  - Total: 88
  - Density: 50/sq mi (19/km^{2})
- Time zone: UTC-8 (Pacific)
  - Summer (DST): UTC-7 (PDT)
- ZIP code: 95965
- Area code: 530, 837
- GNIS feature IDs: 1655889, 2612476

Cherokee is an unincorporated community and census-designated place in Butte County, California, United States. It is an area inhabited by Maidu Indians prior to the gold rush, but takes its name from a band of Cherokee prospectors who perfected a mining claim on the site. The population was 88 at the 2020 census. It lies at an elevation of 1306 feet (398 m).

Possibly the site of the historic gold mine, on the 1994 Cherokee, California 7.5-minute quadrangle, a feature named "Cherokee Placer Mine" exists about 0.65 miles southwest of the above coordinates. USGS identifies Cherokee Flat and Drytown as historic variant names for the community. The town is located on Cherokee Road off State Route 70.

Today, Cherokee now consists of a museum and a Cherokee cemetery, as well as a few houses. The Cherokee Heritage and Museum Association maintains both.

The ZIP Code is 95965. The community is served by area code 530.

== History ==
Cherokee is within the traditional territory of the Maidu. Around 1818 Spanish explorers found gold on Cherokee's south side near Table Mountain. In 1849 Cherokee came from Oklahoma. Welsh miners came in the 1850s, naming the town after the Cherokee and constructing many buildings in town.

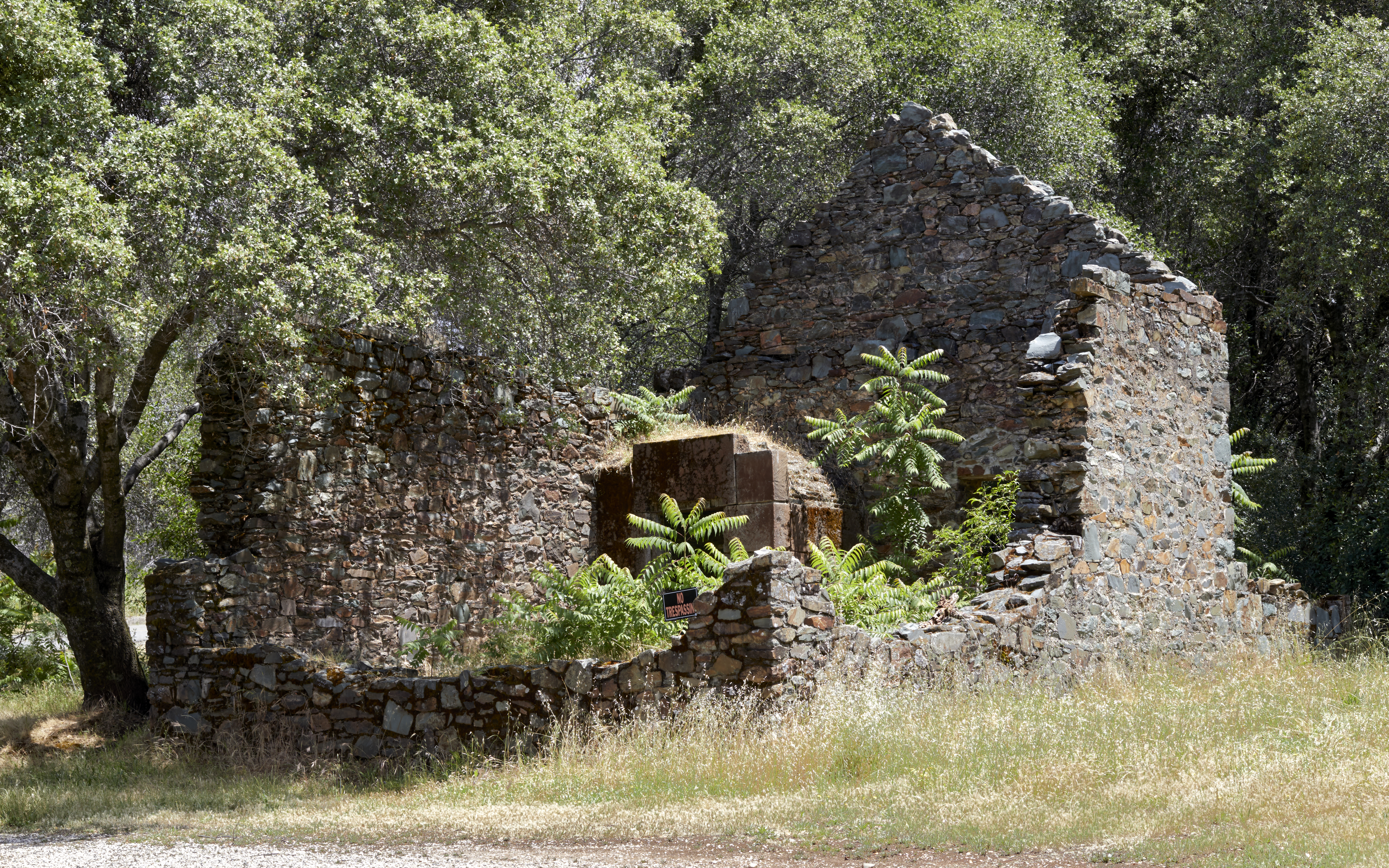
Ruins of Cherokee Bank

Thomas Edison owned one of the mines which sprung up in the area, and he saw to it that the mines were electrified to ease the work. The town prospered during the mining period, and Butte County's first homes with running water were built in Cherokee. A post office operated at Cherokee from 1854 to 1912.

=== The Gold Rush ===
In 1880 President Rutherford B. Hayes, his wife Lucy, Civil War General William T. Sherman and Genera»l John Bidwell came to visit Cherokee's famous hydraulic gold mine. In the 1890s, the gold mines were sold off because of operational costs. At its prime, the town had a population in the thousands. Cherokee, CA had an estimated $15,000,000 in gold that was recovered in the district, which was mostly from the spring valley mine. It’s also worth it to note that Cherokee was the location of the only commercial diamond deposit that was ever mined in California. Though the diamonds were beautiful, their value was very small compared to the value of the gold being found which made them almost worthless.

=== Spring Valley Mine ===
The Spring Valley Mine was formed in 1862 and over time, mines consolidated, by 1870, Cherokee's hydraulic-mining ventures were consolidated into a single operation controlled by the Spring Valley Mining and Irrigation Company. The mine closed in 1894. Still existing in the area are Spring Valley Elementary School, Spring Valley Reservoir, and Spring Valley Gulch (an actual valley)

== Cherokee as a tourist attraction ==
Cherokee, California is not seen as a tourist location though visitors can come to Cherokee to see the museum and the cemetery, and for its two annual festivals, on July 4 and on a weekend near September 24, which is called President Hayes Day.

In the vicinity are Sugarloaf, a nearby promontory which is home to deer, foxes, doves, peacocks and hiking trails. Table Mountain is famous for its springtime wildflowers.

A Chinese Taoist temple, one of America's oldest Taoist establishments (no longer in use), built in the 1860s by the town's small Chinese community, was made a state historic site.

== Demographics ==
Historical population
| Census | Pop. | Note | %± |
|---|---|---|---|
| 2010 | 69 | | — |
| 2020 | 88 | | 27.5% |
U.S. Decennial Census; 2010

=== 2020 census ===
As of the 2020 census, Cherokee had a population of 88. The median age was 45.5 years. The age distribution was 25.0% under the age of 18, 6.8% aged 18 to 24, 17.0% aged 25 to 44, 36.4% aged 45 to 64, and 14.8% who were 65 years of age or older. For every 100 females there were 137.8 males, and for every 100 females age 18 and over there were 127.6 males age 18 and over.

0.0% of residents lived in urban areas, while 100.0% lived in rural areas.

There were 30 households in Cherokee, of which 26.7% had children under the age of 18 living in them. Of all households, 56.7% were married-couple households, 16.7% were cohabiting couple households, 20.0% were households with a male householder and no spouse or partner present, and 6.7% were households with a female householder and no spouse or partner present. About 6.7% of all households were made up of individuals and 0.0% had someone living alone who was 65 years of age or older. The average household size was 2.93. There were 23 families (76.7% of all households).

There were 31 housing units at an average density of 17.7 units per square mile (6.8 units/km^{2}), of which 3.2% were vacant. All occupied units were owner-occupied. The homeowner vacancy rate was 3.2% and the rental vacancy rate was 0.0%.

Racial composition as of the 2020 census
| Race | Number | Percent |
|---|---|---|
| White | 73 | 83.0% |
| Black or African American | 0 | 0.0% |
| American Indian and Alaska Native | 0 | 0.0% |
| Asian | 1 | 1.1% |
| Native Hawaiian and Other Pacific Islander | 0 | 0.0% |
| Some other race | 1 | 1.1% |
| Two or more races | 13 | 14.8% |
| Hispanic or Latino (of any race) | 6 | 6.8% |

=== 2010 census ===
Cherokee first appeared as a census designated place in the 2010 U.S. census.

=== American Community Survey ===
The median household income in Cherokee is $29,896, with an employment rate of 24.5%. An estimated 15.5% ± 16.5% of residents are foreign born, compared to 27.6% ± 0.2% in California.

== Education ==
Grow Academy in Shafter, along with Cherokee nation offering scholarships for their students, and emphasizing tribal history and culture in their curriculum. Local k-12 schools serve the general population of their areas while Cherokee Nation programs help support their students college goals through the scholarships mentioned above.

Some school districts are the Golden Feather Union Elementary School District and the Oroville Union High School District.
