= Cyanotype =

Photographic printing process that produces a blue print

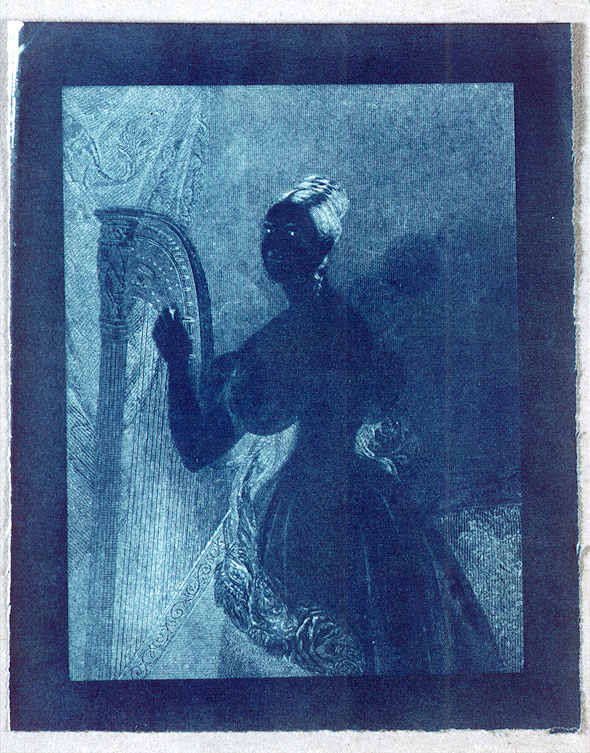
Sir John Herschel (1842) Experimental cyanotype of an unidentified engraving of a lady with a harp, Museum of the History of Science

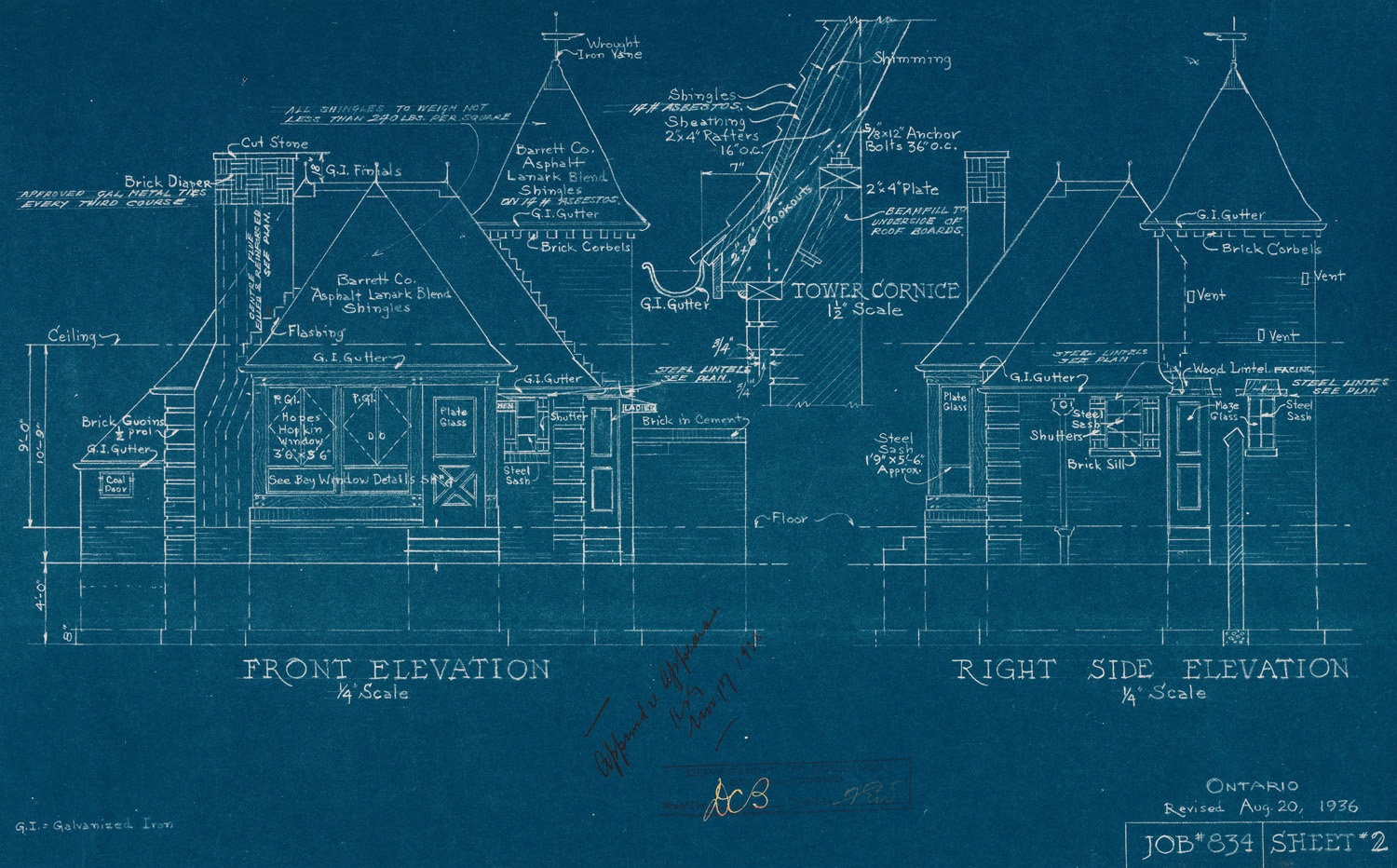
Architectural drawing blueprint, Canada, 1936

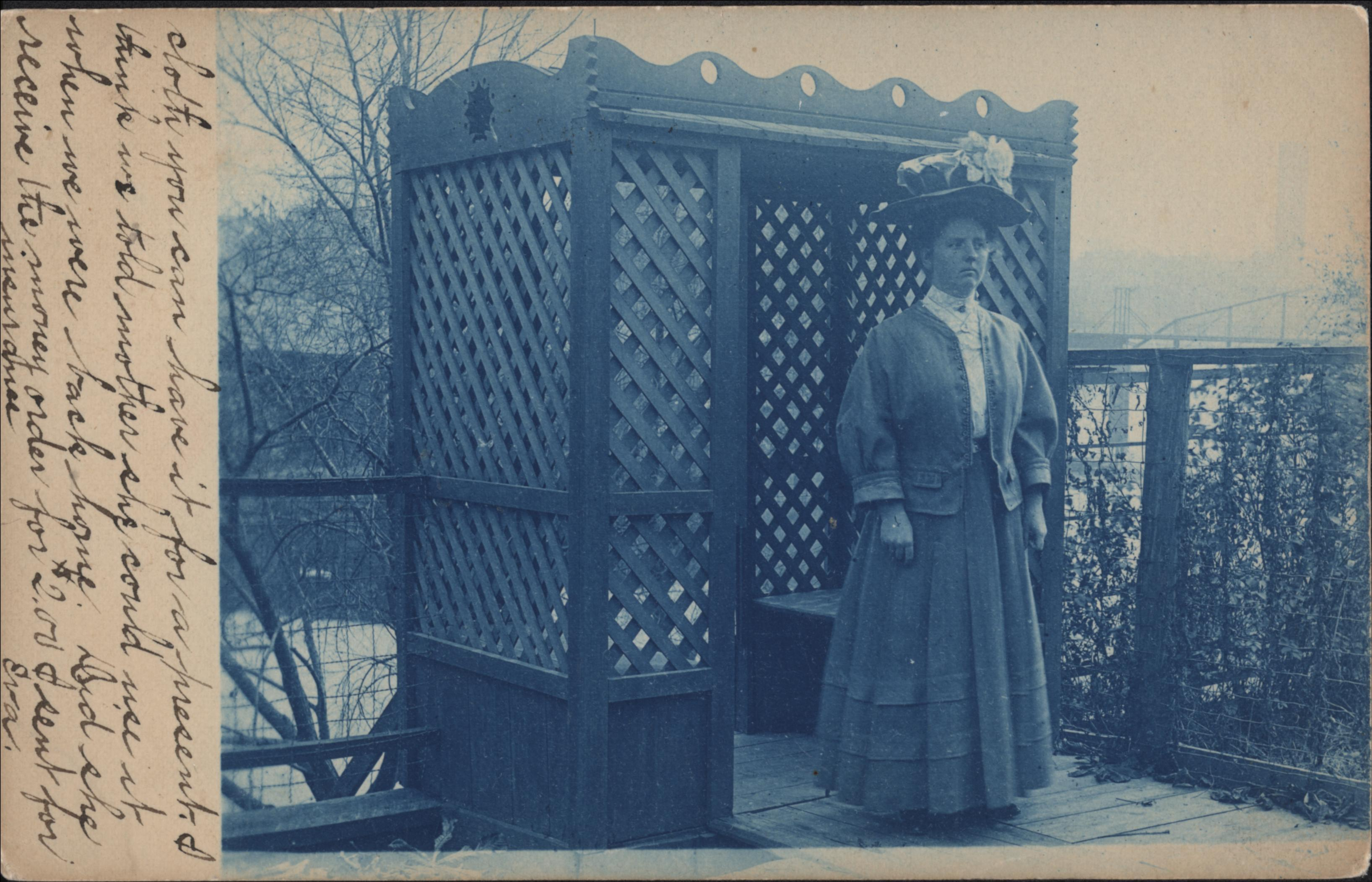
Cyanotype postcard, Racine, Wis., c. 1910

The cyanotype (from Ancient Greek: κυάνεος, kyáneos 'dark blue' and τύπος, týpos 'mark, impression, type') is a slow-reacting, photographic printing formulation sensitive to a limited near-ultraviolet and blue light spectrum, the range of 300 nm to 400 nm, known as UVA radiation. It produces a monochrome, blue-coloured print on a range of supports, and is often used for art and reprography in the form of blueprints. For any purpose, the process usually uses two chemicals – ferric ammonium citrate or ferric ammonium oxalate, and potassium ferricyanide, and only water to develop and fix. Announced in 1842, it is still in use.

== History ==
The cyanotype process was discovered and named by Sir John Herschel. Herschel's investigation of the effects of light on iron compounds was published in 1842. In this investigation Herschel expected that photochemical reactions would reveal the infrared extreme of the electromagnetic spectrum, which had been detected by his father William Herschel, and the ultraviolet or "actinic" rays, that had been discovered in 1801 by Johann Ritter, in a form visible to the human eye. Johann Wolfgang Döbereiner had published earlier in 1831 in German on the light-sensitivity of ferric oxalate, of which Herschel became aware during his visit to Hamburg, but Döbereiner‘s reaction created too lightly toned images and would require a second reaction to make a permanent print.

Alfred Smee had in 1840 used electrochemistry to isolate a pure form of potassium ferricyanide from potassium ferrocyanide, which he sent to Herschel, whose innovation was to use the ammonium iron(III) citrate or tartrate, then commercially available as an iron tonic (meant to remedy iron deficiencies) and also introduced to him by Smee, for photographic purposes. Today, green ferric ammonium citrate is used instead. He mixed the ammonium ferric citrate in a 20% aqueous solution, with 16% of the potassium ferricyanide, to make the sensitizer for coating plain paper. Upon exposure to sunlight, the ferric salt is reduced, and then combines with the ferricyanide to yield ferric ferrocyanide – Prussian blue (also known as Turnbull's blue, or Berlin Blue in Germany). Intensifying and fixing is achieved simply by rinsing the print in water in which unexposed sensitizer and reaction products are readily soluble.

Anna Atkins, a friend of the Herschel family, over 1843–61 and with the assistance of Anne Dixon, hand-printed several albums of botanical and textile specimens, especially Photographs of British Algae: Cyanotype Impressions, effectively the world's first photographically illustrated books. After the Antarctic Ross expedition (1839–1843), John Davis, artist and naturalist on the expedition, made or commissioned some cyanotypes in 1848 from seaweeds collected on the voyage. Also in Australasia, Herbert Dobbie, inspired by Atkins, produced a book New Zealand ferns: 148 varieties, but with double-sided pages of cyanotype prints, in 1880.

John Mercer in the 1850s used the process for printing photographs onto cotton textiles, and discovered means of toning the cyanotype violet, green, brown, red, or black.

As with all of his photographic inventions, Herschel did not patent his cyanotype process. Chemist George Thomas Fisher Jr. quickly disseminated information on the new medium internationally in his popular 50-page manual Photogenic manipulation in 1843, containing plain instructions in the theory and practice of the arts of photography: calotype, cyanotype, ferrotype, chrysotype, anthotype, daguerreotype, and thermography, which the following year was translated into German and Dutch. The medium was immediately taken up and perfected by notable photographic practitioners of the time, including William Henry Fox Talbot and Henry Bosse. The latter, in making fine presentation albums of bridges and structural steel, foresaw an appropriate effect in colour; the intense blues of his refined cyanotypes from large glass plates were printed on fine French paper 37 cm x 43.6 cm, and watermarked Johannot et Cie. Annonay, aloe's satin and leather bound.

Commercial use came only in 1872, the year after Herschel's death. Marion and Company of Paris were first to market the cyanotype, under the proprietary name of "Ferro-prussiate", for reprography of plans and technical drawings and to advantage due to its low cost and simplicity of processing, which required only water. In this application and with the manufacture of blueprint papers, it remained the dominant reprographic process until the 1940s. During the 217-day Siege of Mafeking of the town of Mafeking (Mafikeng) in South Africa during the Second Boer War from October 1899, the process was used to print stamps and banknotes. Unlike many nineteenth-century photographic processes that became obsolete, cyanotype remained in continuous use through the twentieth century due to its widespread adoption for architectural and engineering blueprints and its later revival among artists and alternative-process photographers.

The simple technology of the cyanotype remained accessible in the nonindustrial realm and contributed to folk art; Francois Brunet notes the cyanotypes on cloth used by American home quilt-makers after 1880, and Geoffrey Batchen cites thirty or more early cyanotyped family snapshots on cloth, sewn into pillow slips or quilts, in the collection of Eastman House. Sandra Sider perpetuates this tradition in her own quilt-making and as a proponent for increased museum acquisitions of art quilts.

The cyanotype produced negatives, reversing the darks and lights of the image or object exposed on it, but Herschel also contrived a version, though more complex, to produce positives, which he hoped would aid in his ambition to achieve images of full natural colour. Its difficulties were overcome by Henri Pellet in 1877 in his gum arabic iron cyanofer direct positive photographic tracing method, which he commercialised.

== Process ==
=== Herschel's formula and method ===
In a typical procedure, equal volumes of an 8.1% (w/v) solution of potassium ferricyanide and a 20% solution of ferric ammonium citrate are mixed. The overall contrast of the sensitizer solution can be increased with the addition of about 6 drops of 1% (w/v) solution potassium dichromate for every 2 ml of sensitizer solution.

This mildly photosensitive solution is then applied to a receptive surface (such as paper or cloth) and allowed to dry in a dark place. Cyanotypes can be printed on any support capable of soaking up the iron solution. Although watercolor paper is a preferred medium, cotton, wool, anodized aluminium, and even gelatin sizing on nonporous surfaces have been used. Care should be taken to avoid alkaline-buffered papers, which degrade the image over time.

An image can be produced by exposing sensitised paper to a source of ultraviolet (UV) light (such as sunlight) as a contact print. The combination of UV light and the citrate reduces the iron(III) to iron(II). This is followed by a complex reaction of the iron(II) with ferricyanide. The result is an insoluble, blue pigment (ferric ferrocyanide) known as Prussian blue. The exposure time varies widely, from a few seconds in strong direct sunlight, to 10–20 minute exposures on a dull day.

After exposure, the paper is developed by washing in cold, running water; the water-soluble iron(III) salts are washed away. The parts that were exposed to UV turn blue as the water-insoluble Prussian blue pigment remains in the paper, which gives the print its typical blue color. An acidified rinse using citric acid or vinegar is sometimes used after exposure to help clear residual unexposed ferric compounds, reducing staining and improving highlight separation. The blue color darkens upon drying.

=== Improved formula ===
The ingredients for the process have remained mostly unchanged since its inception in 1840. After 1897, the green form of ammonium ferric citrate introduced by Austrian chemist Eduard Valenta quickly replaced the earlier brown form because it increased the light sensitivity of cyanotype materials, although the final chemical composition of cyanotype images made with either form is identical. In 1994, Mike Ware improved on Herschel's formula with ammonium iron(III) oxalate, also known as ferric ammonium oxalate, to replace the variable and unreliable ammonium ferric citrate. It has the advantage of being made up as a convenient single stock solution with a good shelf-life that does not nourish mould growth. Some formulas include ammonium dichromate to increase contrast and sensitivity; however, ammonium dichromate is toxic, carcinogenic, and an environmental hazard. The solution is well-absorbed by paper fibres, so it does not pool on the surface or result in a tackiness, which may adhere to negatives. The paper better retains the pigment, with little of the Prussian blue image being lost in the washing stage, and exposure is shorter (ca. 4-8 times) than the traditional process. The cyanotype solution, even once its excess is washed off with water, remains photo-sensitive to some degree. A print that has been stored or displayed in bright light will eventually fade, the light causing a chemical reaction that changes the Prussian blue of the cyanotype to white. Storing the cyanotypes in darkness reverses the process, restoring them to their original vibrancy.

Different composition levels of ferric ammonium citrate (or oxalate) and potassium ferricyanide result in a variety of effects in the final cyanotypes. Mixtures of half ferric ammonium citrate and half potassium ferricyanide produces a medium, even shade of blue that is most commonly seen in a cyanotype. A mix of one-third ferric ammonium citrate and two-thirds potassium ferricyanide produces a darker blue, and a more high-contrast final print.

Disadvantages of the Ware formula are a higher cost, more complicated preparation, and a level of toxicity.

=== Printmaking ===
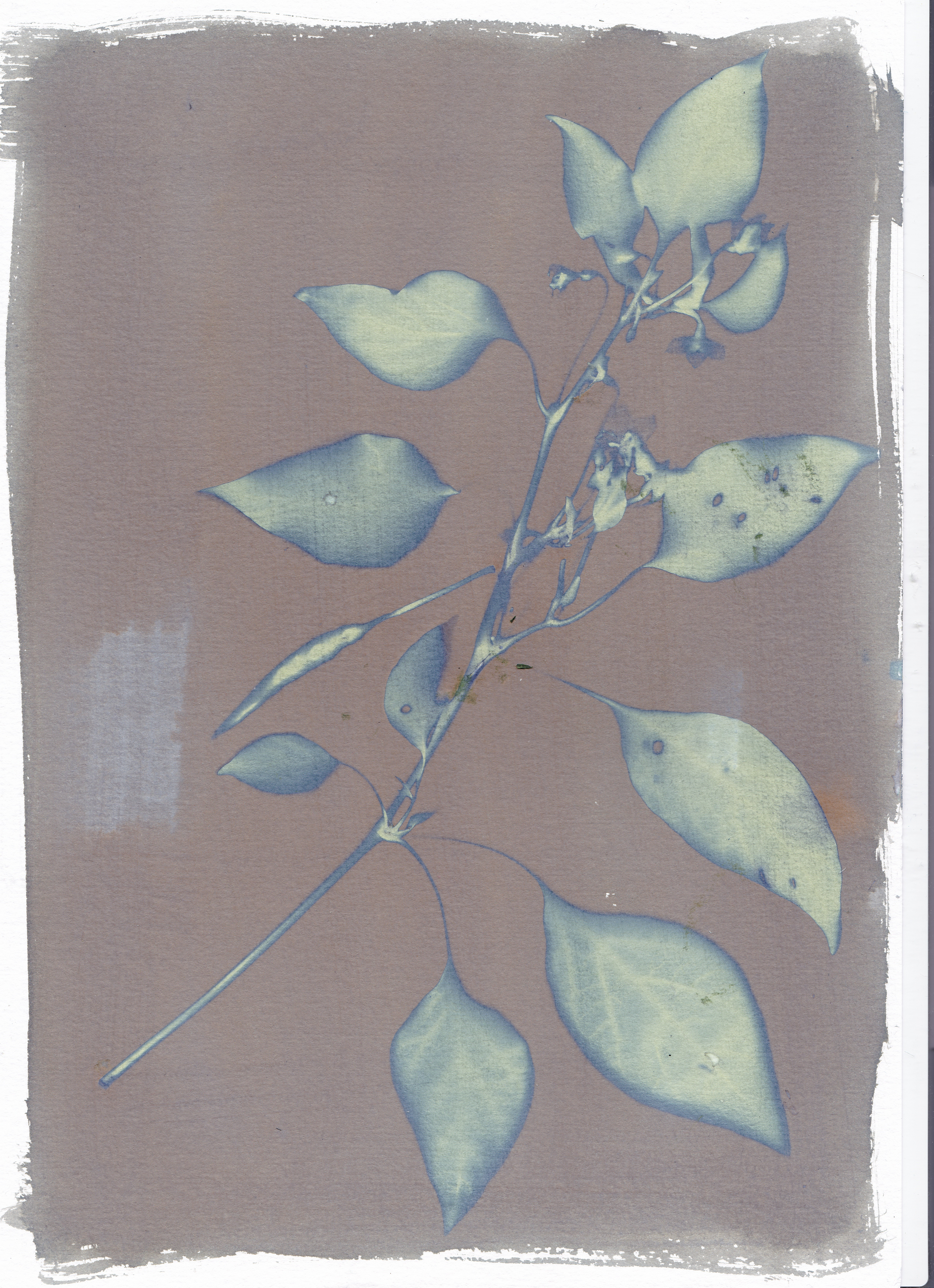
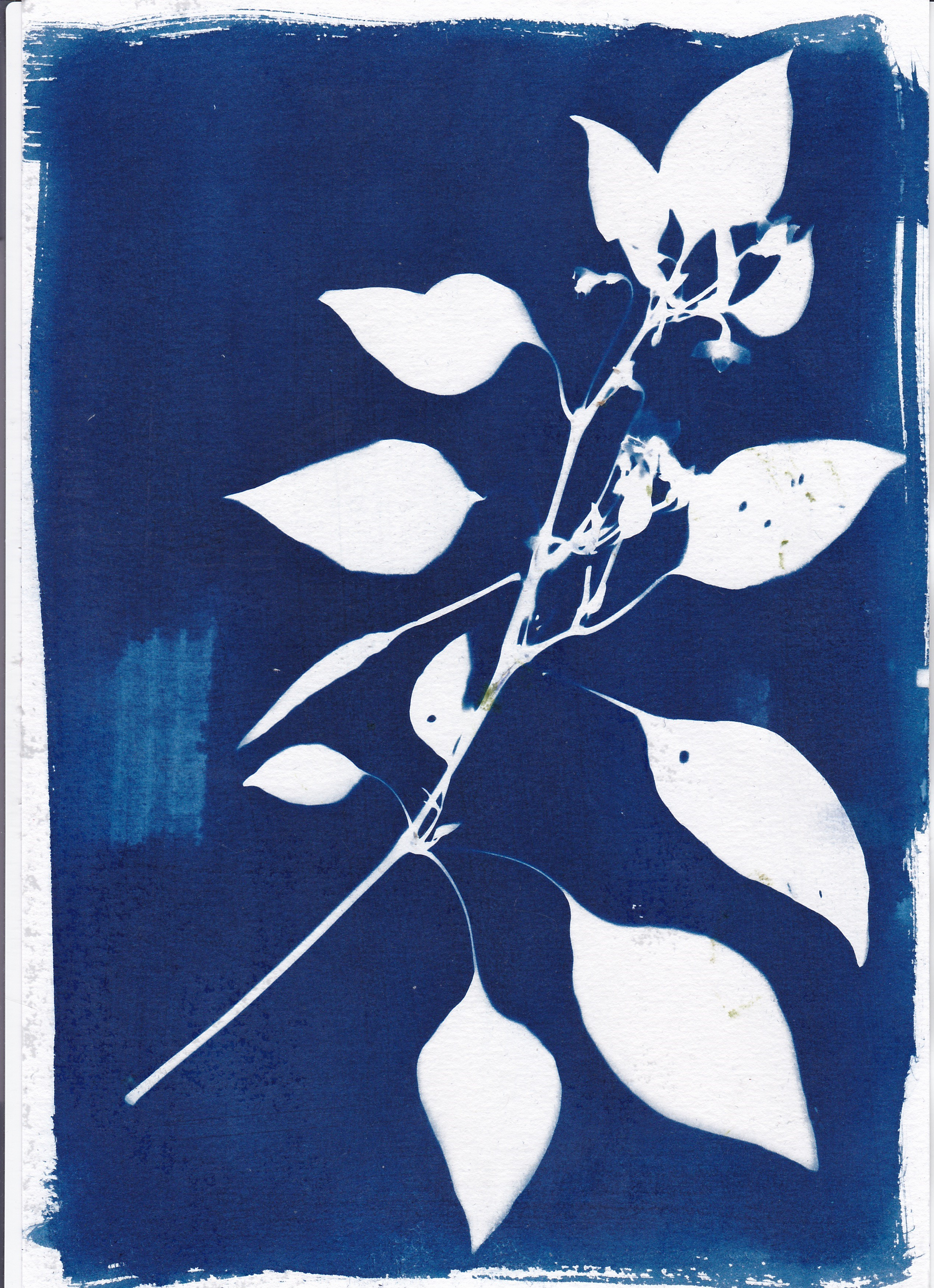
A paprika branch (Chilie) with leaves, cyanotype as a photogram, exposed (left) and developed (right).

The simplest kind of cyanotype print is a photogram, made by arranging objects on sensitised paper. Fresh or pressed plants are a typical subject, but any opaque to translucent object will create an image. A sheet of glass presses flat objects into close contact with the paper, resulting in a sharp image. Otherwise, three-dimensional objects or less-than-perfectly flat ones create a more- or less-blurred image depending on the incidence and breadth of the light source.

Chemigrams are variants of photograms. The cyanotype solution is applied, poured, or sprayed irregularly. A variant of action painting results from repeated washing and application, placing objects on top.

More sophisticated prints can be made from artwork or photographic images on transparent or translucent media. The cyanotype process reverses light and dark, so a negative original is required to print as a positive image. Large-format photographic negatives or transparent digital negatives can produce images with a full tonal range, or lithographic film can be used to create high-contrast images.

The cyanotype may be combination-printed with gumoil, or with a gum bichromate image, in which, for full-colour imaging from colour separations, it may form the blue layer; or it may be combined with a hand-painted or hand-drawn layer.

=== Toning ===
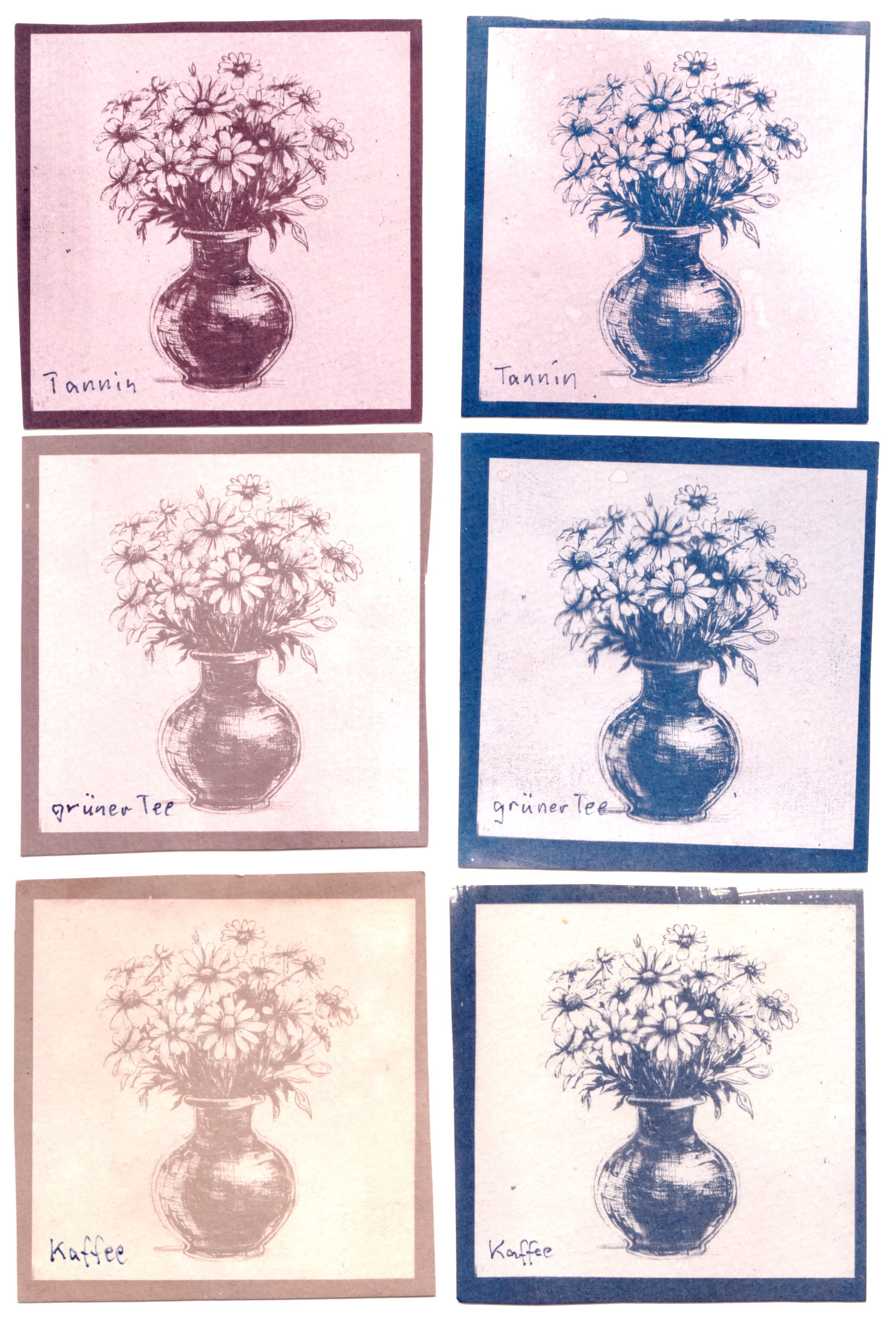
Cyanotype, toned with tannin, tea, and coffee; left side – bleached with washing soda before toning, picture of flower made with Image Creator

In a cyanotype, blue is usually the desired color, but a variety of alternative effects can be achieved. These fall into three categories – reducing, intensifying, and toning. It is common to bleach prints before toning them, but also possible to achieve different effects by toning prints without bleaching.

- Bleaching processes are ways of decreasing the intensity of the blue. Sodium carbonate, ammonia, borax, Dektol photographic developer, and other chemicals can be used to do this. Household bleach is also effective, but tends to destroy the paper base. How much and how long to bleach depends on the image content, emulsion thickness, and what kind of toning is being used. When using a bleaching agent, controlling the bleaching process by washing in clean water as soon as the desired effect is achieved, to prevent loss of detail in the highlights is important.
- Intensifying processes strengthen the blue effect. Chemicals used are hydrogen peroxide or mild acidic substances – citric acid, lemon juice, vinegar/acetic acid, etc. These can also be used to speed up the oxidation process that creates the blue pigment.
- Toning processes are used to change the color of the iron oxide in the print. The color change varies with the reagent used. A variety of agents can be used, including various types of tea, coffee, wine, urine, tannic acid, or pyrogallic acid, resulting in tones varying from brown to black. Most toning processes will to some extent tint the white parts of a print.

=== Long-term preservation ===
One of the most robust of Victorian print technologies, cyanotypes are quite stable on their own, but in contrast to most historical and present-day processes, the prints do not react well to basic environments. As a result, it is not advised to store or present the print in chemically buffered museum board, as this makes the image fade. Another unusual characteristic of the cyanotype is its regenerative behavior: prints that have faded due to prolonged exposure to light can often be significantly restored to their original tone by simply temporarily storing them in a dark environment.

Cyanotypes on cloth are permanent but must be washed by hand with non-phosphate soap so as to not turn the blue to yellow.

== Cyanotype in artistic practice ==
=== Artistic potential ===
The cyanotype's success as a form of artistic expression lies in its capacity for manipulation or distortion. It produces distinctive effects and is versatile, enabling prints to be made on a wide variety of surfaces, including paper, wood, fabric, glass, Perspex, bone, shell and eggshell, plaster and ceramics, and at any scale; to date 2017, the largest is 276.64 m^{2} (2977.72 ft^{2}), created by Stefanos Tsakiris in Thessaloniki, Greece, on 18 September 2017. Robin Hill in 2001 exhibited Sweet Everyday, a 30.5 m (100 ft) cyanotype enwrapping Lennon, Weinberg, Inc.'s Soho gallery, and evoking wavy brushstrokes by placing ordinary shopping bags on photo-sensitive paper exposed to light. For photographic negatives or positives enlargement directly onto the emulsion is not feasible due to the low sensitivity of the emulsion (except with a solar enlarger), so requires contact printing at 1:1 ratio. The low sensitivity permits progress to be inspected in a printing frame during exposure. Consequently and because of its long exposure scale it suits most negatives whether of high or low contrast. As a recognisably 19th century technology, artists like John Dugdale use it to evoke, or to critique, Victorian aesthetics and social constructs.

The artist is not restricted to the reproduction of existing photographic negatives. Prints can be made of three-dimensional objects, utilising the ability of the objects to be placed on top of the photosensitive material. Once exposed to light, the final print is of an outline of an item with internal detail where they allow light, depending on their relative transparency and exposure, to filter through; Anna Atkins' botanical cyanotypes sharply register the more transparent segments of a petal or leaf. An object original, used to make a cyanotype photogram, including the human figure for example, is reproduced at actual size. Robert Rauschenberg's and Susan Weil's collaborative cyanotypes, including Untitled (Double Rauschenberg), c. 1950 were made by both artists lying down, hands held, on a large piece of photosensitive paper (treated with cyanotype chemicals). The resulting prints of their bodies in various poses are currently part of the Museum of Modern Art's permanent collection. In France, from the end of the 1970s, Nancy Wilson-Pajic made cyanotype photograms of everything from a broken windshield to herself (Falling Angels), and eventually several long series of museum collections and of Haute-Couture robes by Christian Lacroix and other designers. The results have been shown all over the world and are in major institutions and public collections.

The blue hue naturally associates symbolically with sea or sky. As German photographer Thomas Kellner notes of his 1997 Cubist multi-pinhole portraits of porcelain dolls; "I am specially happy with the blue colour in this series as the blue has a different depth in the background than a black print. Blue is still infinite, whereas black usually has the character of ending." The negative form may be disorienting or surreal; while white is often used to frame or highlight a central subject in many artistic media, the opposite may be true in the cyanotype, requiring the artist to adapt their ideas to the effect.

Equally important is the expressive potential of the application of emulsion using brush, squeegee, roller or cloth, or by stamping, for calligraphic effect.

The cyanotype process is quite flexible, and it can be scaled up to incredible sizes. For example, in 2017, Stefanos Tsakiris created a 276.64 square meter cyanotype in Thessaloniki, Greece. The print, which holds the world record for the largest cyanotype print, was made to help teach people about cyanotype photography and increase environmental awareness.

== Artists ==
=== Nineteenth century ===
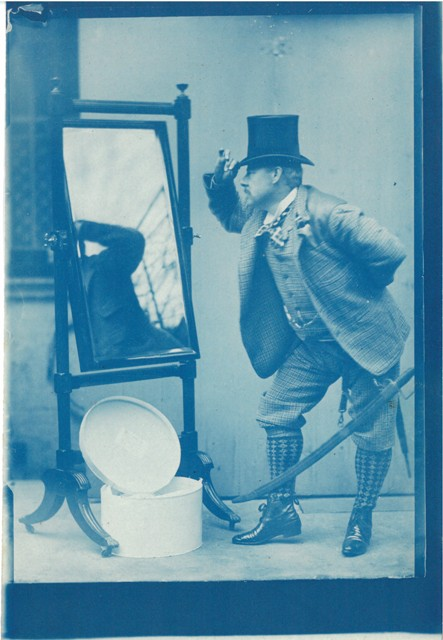
Self portrait of Linley Sambourne modelling (10 January 1895) for Punch cartoon 'Quite English, You Know!

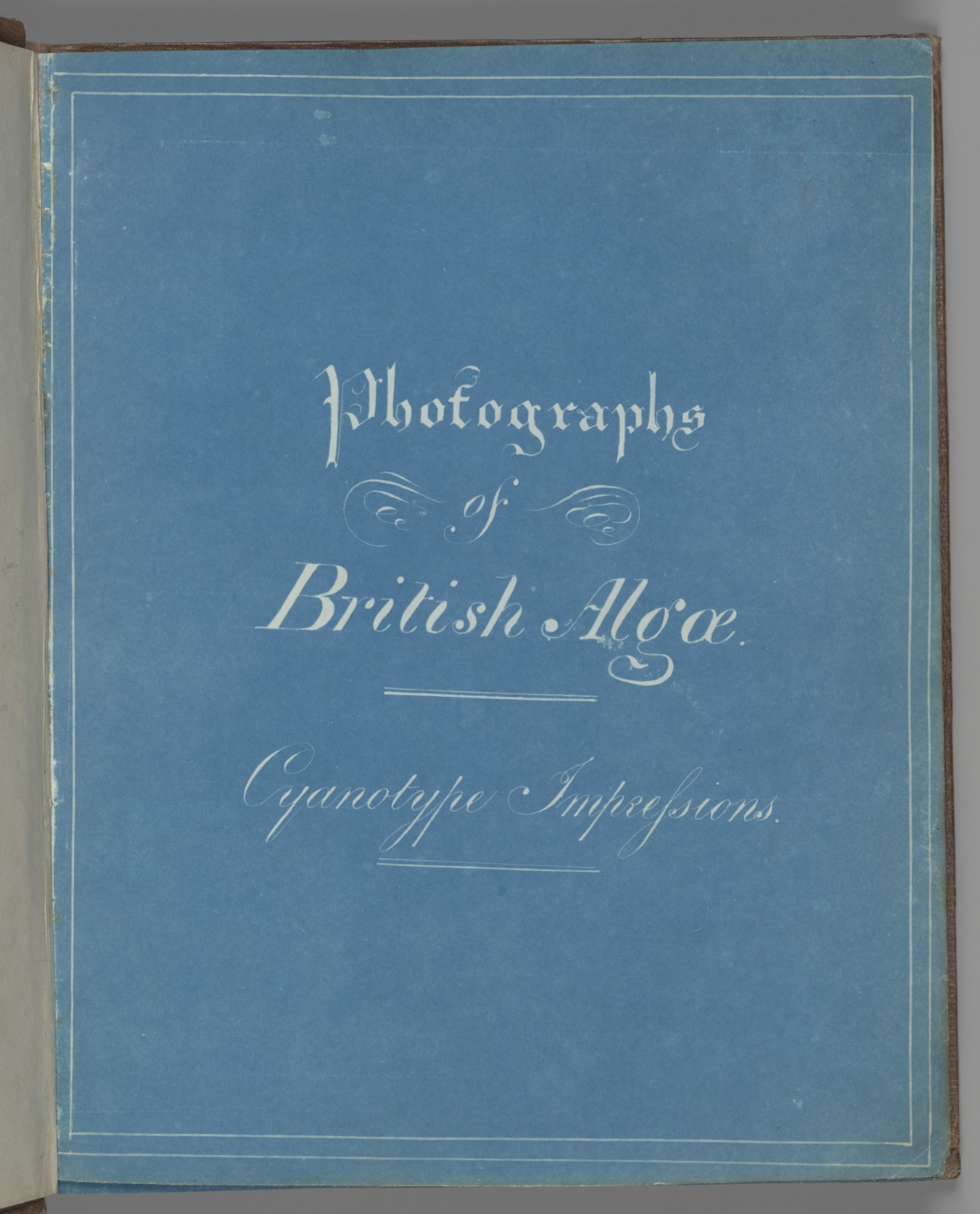
Anna Atkins, Photographs of British Algae: Cyanotype Impressions, cyanotype, 1843-53

==== Britain ====
Anna Atkins, who was also an accomplished watercolorist, in her cyanotype botanical specimens, is considered the first to make art with the medium in which the sea plants appear suspended in an oceanic blue, and while her hundreds of images satisfy a scientific curiosity, their aesthetic quality has served as inspiration for cyanotype artists ever since.

Cyanotype photography was popular in Victorian England, but became less popular as photography improved. By the mid-1800s few photographers continued to exploit its accessible qualities and at the Great Exhibition of 1851, despite extensive displays of photographic technology, only a single example of the cyanotype process was included. Peter Henry Emerson exemplified the British attitude that cyanotypes were unworthy of purchase or exhibition with his assertion that: "No one but a vandal would print a landscape in red, or in cyanotype."

Consequently, the process devolved to the proofing of domestic negatives by hobbyist photographers and to postcards, though another British scientist, Fellow of the Royal Astronomical Society Washington Teasdale, delivered hundreds of lectures throughout his lifetime and was among the first to illustrate them with lantern slides, and, up to 1890, to record his experiments and specimens, used the cyanotype, a collection of which is held at the Museum of the History of Science, Oxford.

Edwin Linley Sambourne used cyanotypes as an archive of reference images for his Punch cartoons.

==== France ====
Curators and practitioners in France embraced the process. Caricaturist, illustrator, writer and portrait photographer Bertall (born Charles Albert, vicomte d' Arnoux, comte de Limoges-Saint-Saëns) as partner of Hippolyte Bayard was commissioned in the 1860s to make cyanotype portraits from glass negatives for the Société d'Ethnographie for their publication Collection anthropologique. While artistic in execution they also satisfy with the scientific interests of the group as each subject is photographed nude with front, back and profile views, not in the field but in his studio. The project also takes advantage of the ease of making multiples of cyanotypes for the publication Henri Le Secq's cyanotypes, which he made after he gave up photography after 1856 to continue painting and collecting art, were reprints of his famous works and made around 1870 as he was afraid of possible loss due to fading. He gave the reprints dates of the original negatives, some of which are still in good condition. They are well-represented in French collections. From the early 1850s through the 1870s Corot, with associated artists working in and near the town Barbizon adopted the hand-drawn cliché-verre, and though most were printed on salted or albumenized paper, some used the cyanotype.

==== United States ====
In the US the medium persevered into the 20th century. Eadweard Muybridge made cyanotype contact prints of his animal locomotion sequences, and Edward Curtis' ethnographic cyanotypes of native North Americans are preserved in the George Eastman House.

=== Pictorialism ===
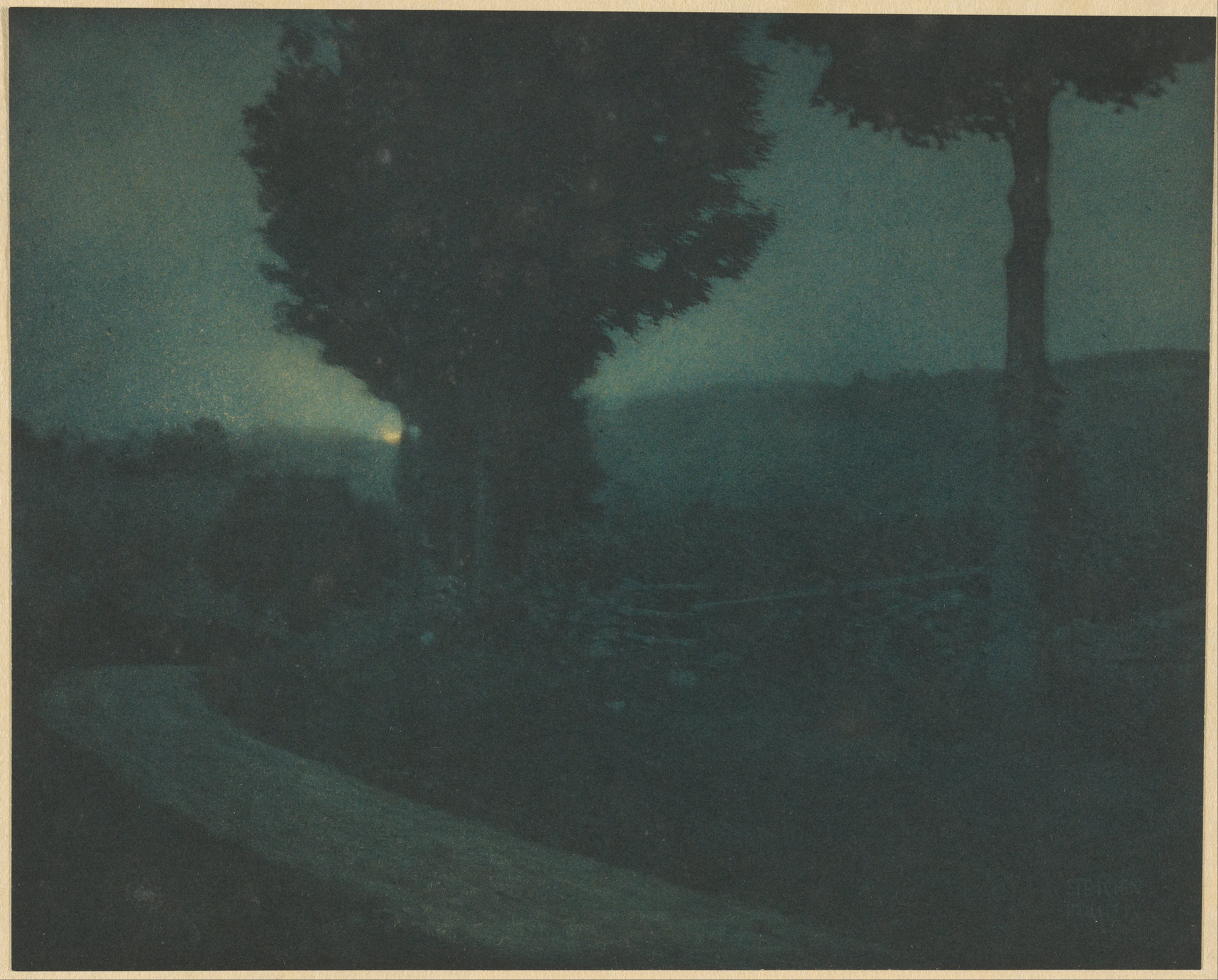
Edward Steichen (1904) Midnight Lake George or Road into the Valley – Moonrise.

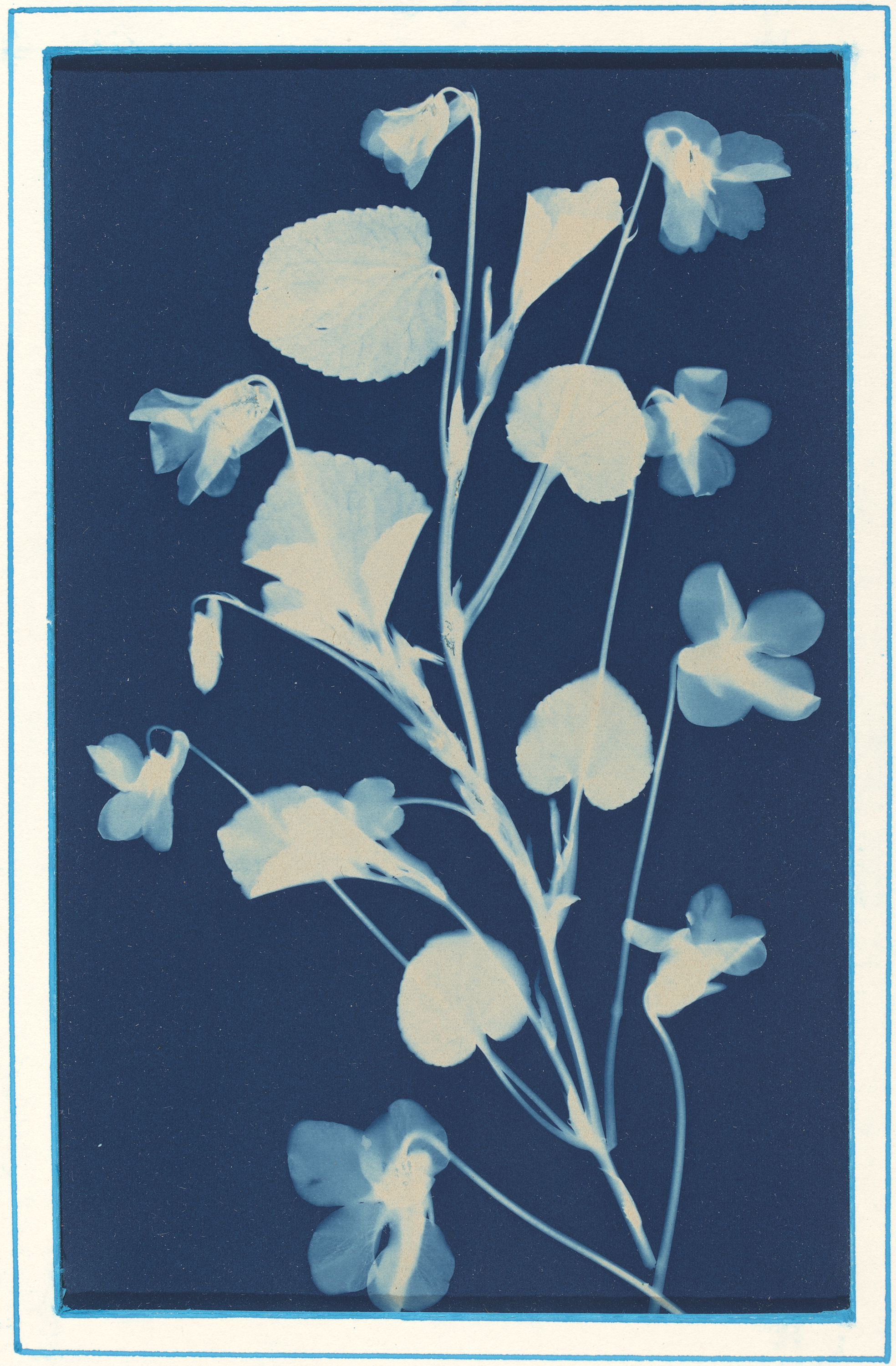
Bertha Evelyn Jaques, Untitled, c. 1900, cyanotype, NGA 136408

Pictorialists, throughout Europe and other western countries, in efforts to have photography accepted as an art form, emphasised handcraft in printing, in imitation of painting and drawing, and drew on Symbolist subject matter and themes. Many of the practitioners were respected amateurs whose work was rewarded in a system of international 'salons' run by such organisations as the Camera Club of New York, and competition promoted an elevated level of technical experimentation with all of the then-current processes, such as calotypy, cyanotypy, gum printing, platinum printing, bromoil and Autochrome colour.

Clarence White's impeccable domestic and plein-air pictures are indebted in their bold composition to his contemporaries the painters Thomas Wilmer Dewing, William Merritt Chase and John White Alexander. His labor-intensive process entailed developing the negatives then making tests on cyanotype, playing with dimensions, proportions, and other variables, before making a print in platinum, which he then meticulously and expressively retouched. Alfred Steiglitz in White's portrait of him (1907) held in Princeton University Art Museum, appears gloweringly critical in the cyanotype print preserved there.

At the turn of the century, painter-photographer Edward Steichen, then associated with Alfred Steiglitz who promoted the Photo-Secession and Pictorialism through his Camera Work (1903–1917) produced prints of Midnight Lake George now held in The Alfred Stieglitz Collection: Photographs at the Art Institute of Chicago where in 2007 scientific examination of the prints and his records concluded that cyanotype had been incorporated in their predominant gum bichromate over platinum production. Steichen argued provocatively in the first issue of Camera Work that "every photograph is a fake from start to finish, a purely impersonal, unmanipulated photograph being practically impossible."

Photo-Secessionist Franco-American Paul Burty-Havilland, involved through marriage with the Lalique company, evinces a Japonisme in his moody cyanotype portraits and nudes made between 1898–1920. Another American Pictorialist Fred Holland Day made cyanotypes of youths, nude or in sailor suits, in 1911, that are held in the Library of Congress, and French artist Charles-François Jeandel printed his erotic imagery of bound women in his painting workshop in Paris and then in Charente 1890–1900.

The more traditional American printmaker Bertha Jaques, aligned with the antimodernist views of the late Victorian Arts and Crafts movement, produced more than a thousand cyanotype photograms of wildflowers.

=== Impressionism ===
American artist Theodore Robinson painted in Giverny 1887–1892, contemporaneous with Monet of whom he made a portrait in cyanotype, and of the haystacks that Monet famously painted. He noted that "Painting directly from nature is difficult as things do not remain the same; the camera helps to retain the picture in your mind." He often drew a grid over his cyanotypes or albumen prints to assist transferring the composition, with compositional amendments, onto canvas, though conscious that "I must beware of the photo, get what I can of it and then go." His photographic imagery is held in the Canajoharie Library and Art Gallery and the Terra Foundation for the Arts.

=== Modernism ===
Arthur Wesley Dow's modernist approach was influential on the Pictorialists in the eloquently simple compositions of his New England environment, like Pine Tree (1895), a cyanotype, related to his interest, while studying in France, in the flat, decorative qualities of Japanese art and that of Les Nabis.

In Europe, Josef Sudek, the 'Poet of Prague' sometimes employed the cyanotype to impressionist effect during the early Modernist period.

Milan-born photographer, printmaker, painter, set designer and experimental film-maker, Luigi Veronesi, well-informed about the international debate on abstraction, was impressed with the abstract potential of the photogram. He participated in a 1934 exhibition in Paris with the international group of abstract artists 'Abstraction-Création', through which he met with Fernand Léger. He drew inspiration from Léger's Ballet Mécanique, Surrealism via the Metaphysical painting of Georgio de Chirico, and fellow photographer Giuseppe Cavalli with whom, convinced of the essential 'uselessness' of art, in 1947 he founded a group named La Bussola (The Compass). Influenced by Constructivist theories (and politically aligned with Communism), Veronesi used the cyanotype photogram after 1932 as a means of revealing metaphysical qualities in objects.

=== Late modern ===
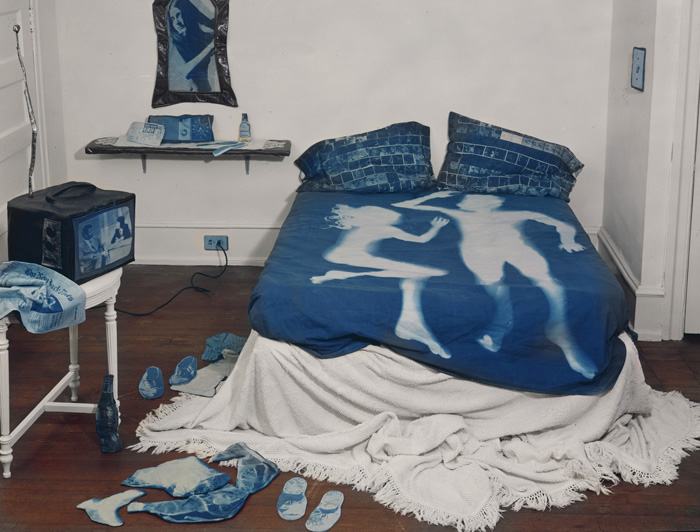
Catherine Jansen (1981) The Blue Room, cyanotype on fabric, mixed media.

In a 2008 essay A.D. Coleman perceived a return of the legacy Pictorialist methods being applied in art photography from 1976, a tendency represented in Francesca Woodman's late cyanotypes and in contact prints by Barbara Kasten and Bea Nettles. Weston Naef, curator of photography at the J. Paul Getty Museum in Los Angeles, in a 1998 New York Times article by critic Lyle Rexer, confirmed that "Looking back at [photography's] pioneers, today's artists see a way to restore expression to an art beguiled by technology," referring to the loss of 'intimacy' in digital imaging to account for artists' attraction to daguerreotypes, tintypes, cyanotypes, stereopticon images, albumen prints, collodion wet plates; all physical and 'hands-on' methods. Artists David McDermott and Peter McGough, who met in the East Village New York art scene of the 1980s, and until 1995 took the phenomenon to the extreme of reconstructing themselves as Victorian gentlemen, adopting the lifestyle and documenting it and their possessions using vintage cameras and materials, first inspired by their discovery of the cyanotype, and dating their contemporary works in the nineteenth century.

=== Contemporary ===
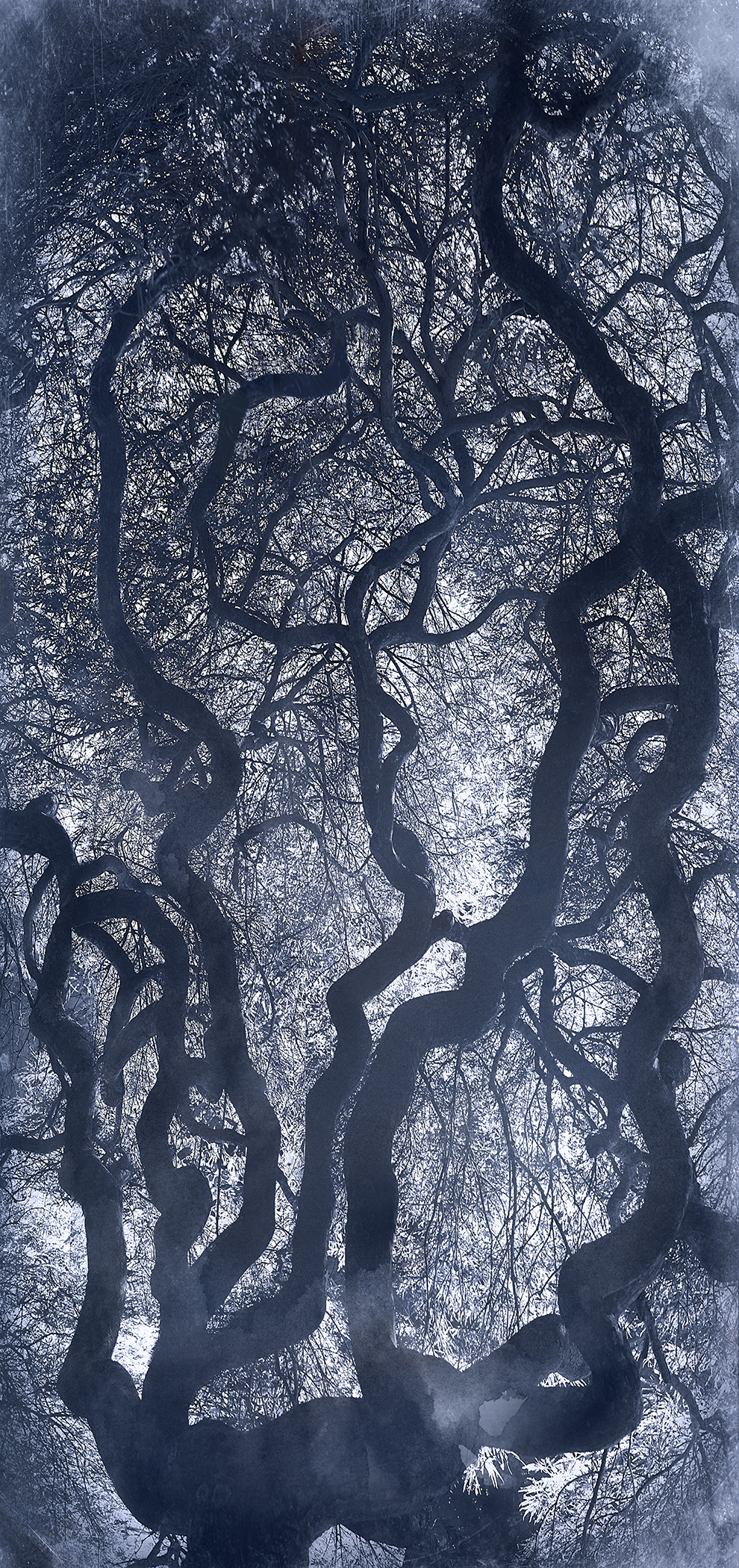
Indigo XII, Kate Cordsen. Cyanotype on handmade paper

Since 2000 around 10 books, and in growing numbers, are published each year in English in which 'cyanotype' appears in the title, compared to only 95 in total from 1843 to 1999. Though it has been an artform since its inception, the numbers of artists now employing the cyanotype process have burgeoned, and they are not solely photographers. In the book of the 2022 British exhibition Squaring the Circles of Confusion: Neo-Pictorialism in the 21st Century eight contemporary artists: Takashi Arai, Céline Bodin, Susan Derges, David George, Joy Gregory, Tom Hunter, Ian Phillips-McLaren and Spencer Rowell employ the craft of photography for postmodern purpose, including the cyanotype.

==== International ====
Many were included in the first American international survey of the cyanotype in 2016; the Worcester Art Museum's Cyanotypes: Photography's Blue Period which displayed uses of the medium that extend well beyond the utilitarian contact-printing of negatives; Annie Lopez stitched together cyanotypes printed on tamale paper to create dresses; Brooke Williams tea-toned her cyanotypes, adjusting their color to accord with her story as a Jamaican American woman; and Hugh Scott-Douglas experimented with photograms and abstraction.

In 2018, the New York Public Library exhibited the work of nineteen contemporary artists who employ the medium. Mounted 175 years after Anna Atkin's first book of cyanotypes, British Algae, the exhibition was titled Anna Atkins Refracted: Contemporary Works.

Amongst others currently working in, or with, cyanotype are;

==== United States ====
Christian Marclay who suggests musical scores in his grids of cassette tapes or their unspooling.

Kate Cordsen applies Japanese aesthetics and non-Cartesian perspective in her mural-scale cyanotype landscapes.

Betty Hahn was early to incorporate cyanotype with other art media including hand-painting with embroidery as a feminist statement

Meghann Riepenhoff reprises Anna Atkins by exposing her prepared papers underneath the waves, so light filters through moving sand, shells, and water currents.

==== Canada ====
Canadian Erin Shirreff translates her sculptural interests into large-scale cyanotype photograms of temporary three-dimensional compositions in her studio with hours-long exposures during which component forms are moved, added or subtracted for transparent effect.

==== Germany ====
German artist Marco Breuer abrades cyanotype prints on watercolour paper in representations of the passing of time.

==== Iceland ====
Icelandic artist and filmmaker Inga Lísa Middleton employs the cyanotype for nostalgic representations of her homeland, and as a symbolic colour in imagery alerting audiences to an emerging catastrophe in the marine environment.

==== United Kingdom ====
London-born, Los Angeles-based artist Walead Beshty's Barbican Centre installation A Partial Disassembling of an Invention, Without a Future: Helter Skelter and Random Notes in Which the Pulleys and Cogwheels Are Lying Around at Random All Over the Workbench covered The Curve gallery with more than 12,000 cyanotype prints made by placing objects from the artist's studio on UV-sensitive porous surfaces such as discarded paper or cardboard; the works were installed as a visual timeline from October 2013 to September 2014."Walead Beshty: A Partial Disassembling of an Invention..." Barbican. Barbican Centre.

== World Cyanotype Day ==
World Cyanotype Day (WCD) is celebrated on the last Saturday of September. Since 2015, it has brought together global community of artists to share prints and celebrate the cyanotype process.

== See also ==
- Blueprint
- Sepia
- Monochrome
- Film tinting
- Spirit duplicator
- Mimeograph
- Duotone
