= Panelling =

Millwork wall covering

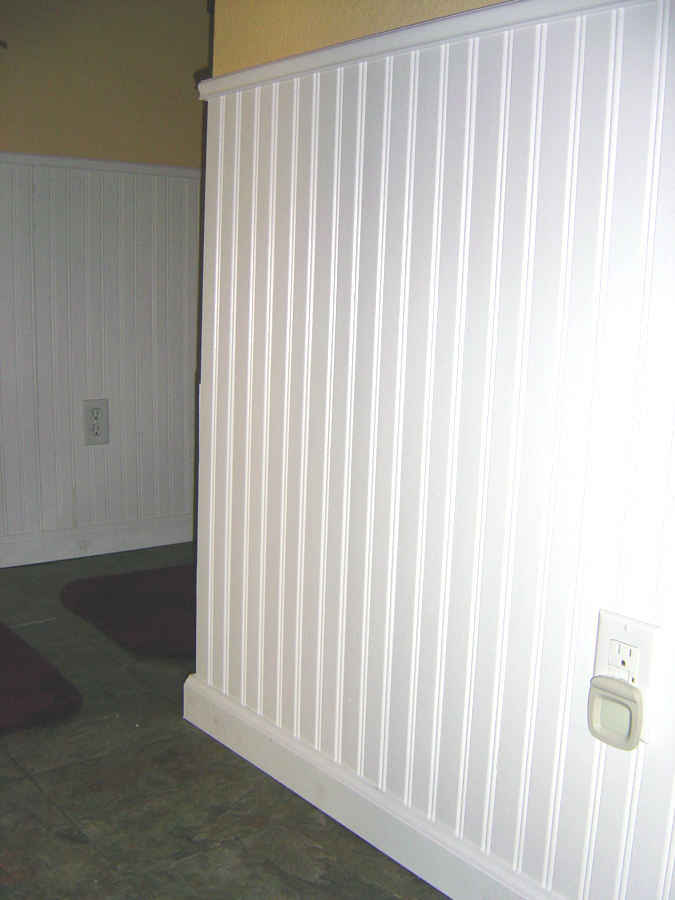
39 in (990 mm) wainscoting using 3 in (76 mm) tongue and groove pine boards

Panelling, or paneling in the United States, is a millwork wall covering constructed from rigid or semi-rigid components. These are traditionally interlocking wood, but could be plastic or other materials.

Panelling was developed in antiquity to make rooms in stone buildings more comfortable both by insulating the room from the stone and reflecting radiant heat from wood fires, making heat more evenly distributed in the room. In more modern buildings, such panelling is often installed for decorative purposes. Panelling, such as wainscoting and boiserie in particular, may be extremely ornate and is particularly associated with 17th and 18th century interior design, Victorian architecture in Britain, and its international contemporaries.

== Wainscot panelling ==
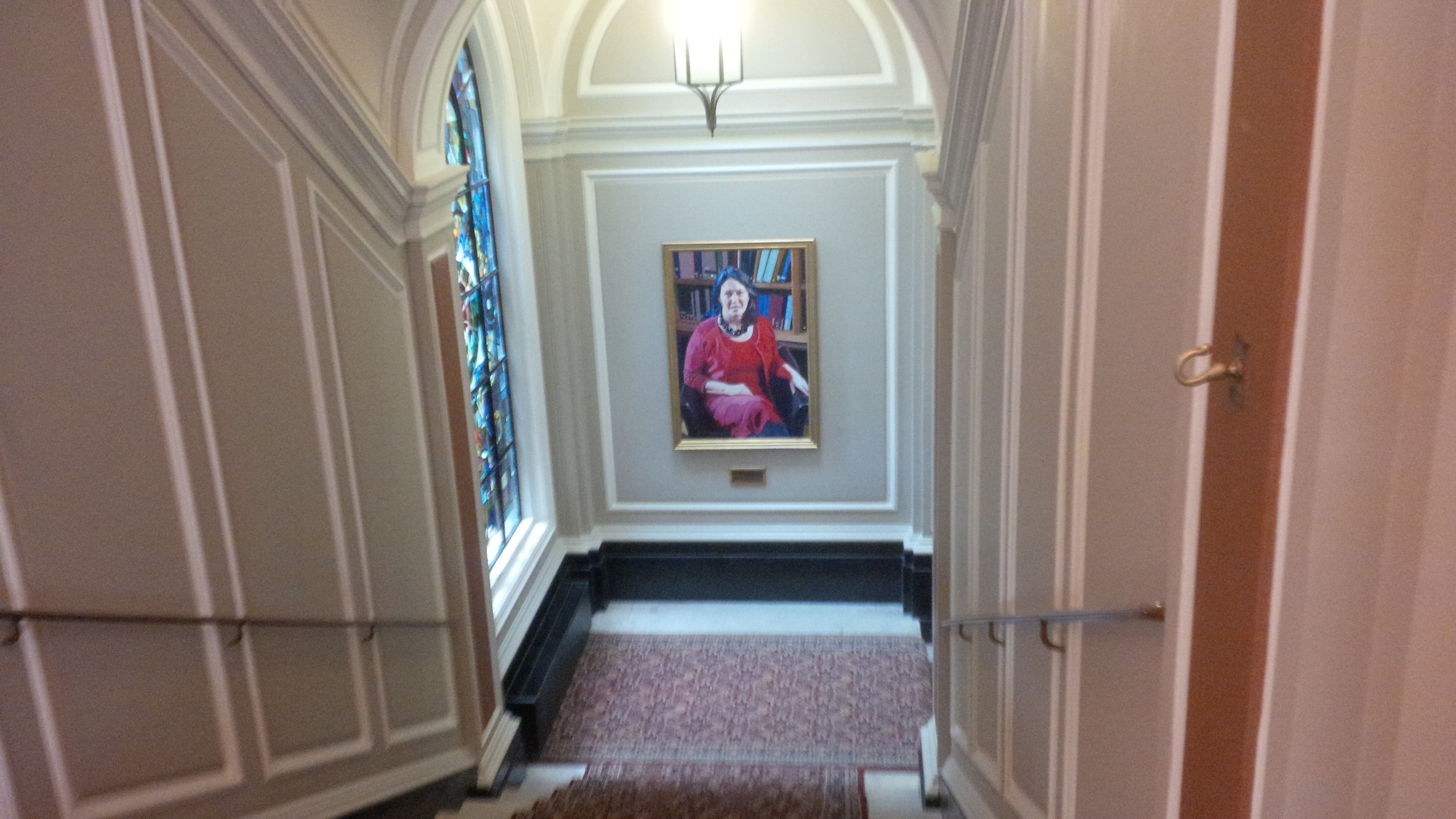
Simple moulded panelling on the walls of a staircase

The term wainscot (UK: /ˈweɪnskət/ WAYN-skət or US: /ˈweɪnskɒt/ WAYN-skot) originally applied to high quality riven oak boards.

Wainscot oak came from large, slow-grown forest trees, and produced boards that were knot-free, low in tannin, light in weight, and easy to work with. It was preferred to home-grown oak, especially in the Netherlands and British Isles, because it was a far superior product and dimensionally stable.

The Oxford English Dictionary states that it derives from the Middle Low German wagenschot as well as wageschot or 'wall-board'. Johnson's Dictionary defined it thus:

Wainscot [wageschot, Dutch], the inner wooden covering of a wall.
To wainscot [waegenschotten, Dutch], to line the walls with boards

A 'wainscot' was therefore a board of riven (and later quarter-sawn) oak, and wainscoting was the panelling made from it. During the 18th century, oak wainscot was almost entirely superseded for panelling in Europe by softwoods (mainly Scots pine and Norway spruce), but the name stuck:

The term wainscoting, as applied to the lining of walls, originated in a species of foreign oak of the same name, used for that purpose; and although that has long been superseded by the introduction of fir timber, the term has been continued notwithstanding the change of material.

— Peter Nicholson, An Architectural Dictionary (1819)

Today the term wainscot refers commonly to the different treatment of the lower part of the wall (roughly a meter, 3–4 feet); see also dado.

== Boiserie ==
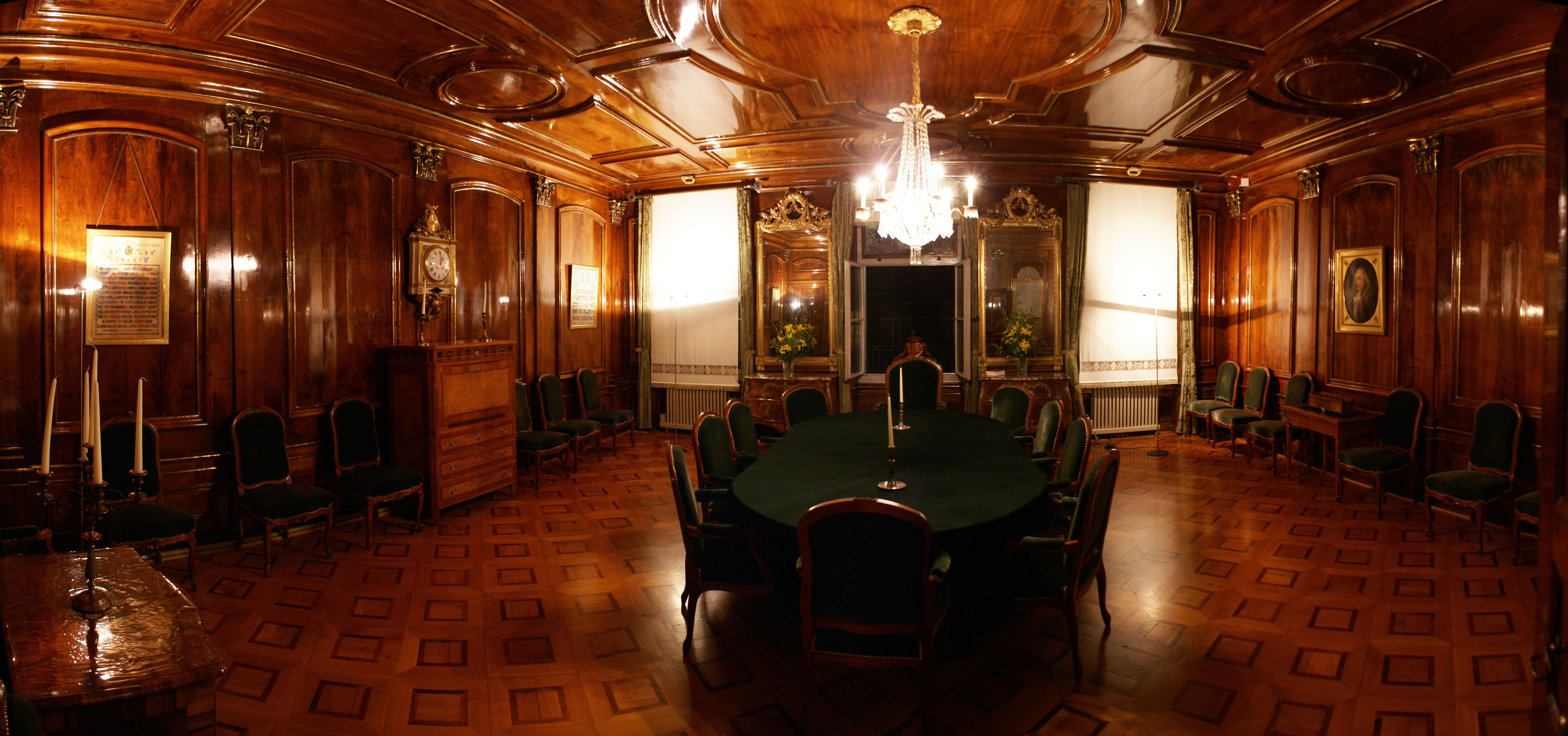
Elaborate boiseries in the guild hall of the Zunfthaus zu Kaufleuten, Kramgasse 29, Bern

Boiserie (French pronunciation: [bwazʁi]; often used in the plural boiseries) is the French term used to define ornate and intricately carved wood panelling. Boiseries became popular in the latter part of the 17th century in French interior design, becoming a de rigueur feature of fashionable French interiors throughout the 18th century. Such panels were most often painted in two shades of a chosen color or in contrasting colors, with gilding reserved for the main reception rooms. The Palace of Versailles contains many fine examples of white painted boiseries with gilded mouldings installed in the reigns of Louis XV and Louis XVI. The panels were not confined to just the walls of a room but were used to decorate doors, frames, cupboards, and shelves also. It was standard for mirrors to be installed and framed by the carved boiseries, especially above the mantelpiece of a fireplace. Paintings were also installed within boiseries, above doorways or set into central panels.

== Wood wall panelling ==
Wood wall panelling has seen a resurgence in popularity in recent years, as it is seen as warmer.

== See also ==
- Crown moulding
- Dado (architecture)
- Dado rail
- Frame and panel
- Moulding (decorative)
- Ornament (art)
- Panel edge staining
- Structural insulated panel
- Vacuum insulated panel
- Wall panel
- Woodie (car body style)
