= Kaja Silverman =

American art historian

- Born: September 16, 1947 (age 79)
- Title: Katherine and Keith L. Sachs Professor of Art History, University of Pennsylvania

Academic background
- Education: University of California, Santa Barbara (B.A., M.A.); Brown University (PhD)
- Website: www.kajasilverman.com

Kaja Silverman (born September 16, 1947) is an American art historian and critical theorist. She is currently the Katherine and Keith L. Sachs Professor of Art History at the University of Pennsylvania.

She received B.A. and M.A. degrees in English from the University of California, Santa Barbara and a Ph.D. in English from Brown University. Thereafter, she taught at Yale University, Trinity College, Simon Fraser University, Brown University, the University of Rochester and for many years was the Class of 1940 Professor in the Rhetoric Department at the University of California, Berkeley. She was awarded a Guggenheim Fellowship in 2008, and is currently the holder of an Andrew W. Mellon Foundation Distinguished Achievement Award.

== Work ==
Her writing and teaching at the moment are focused primarily on photography, contemporary art, and painting. She is currently writing the second volume, A Three-Personed Picture: or the History of Photography Part 2, of a three part revisionary history and theory of photography. The first volume, Miracle of Analogy, was published in 2015.

Silverman has written extensively on a wide range of figures including artists: Jean-Luc Godard, Gerhard Richter, Marcel Proust, Ranier Maria Rilke, Terrence Malick, James Coleman, Jeff Wall, Chantal Akerman, John Dugdale (photographer), and thinkers: Jacques Lacan, Friedrich Nietzsche, Sigmund Freud, Walter Benjamin, Martin Heidegger, Maurice Merleau-Ponty, Lou Andreas-Salomé.

Silverman co-wrote Speaking About Godard with the German artist and filmmaker Harun Farocki.

== Publications ==
- The Subject of Semiotics (Oxford University Press, 1983)
- The Acoustic Mirror: The Female Voice in Psychoanalysis and Cinema (Indiana University Press, 1988)
- Male Subjectivity at the Margins (Routledge Press, 1992)
- The Threshold of the Visible World (Routledge Press, 1996)
- Speaking About Godard (New York University Press, 1998; with Harun Farocki)
- World Spectators. Stanford University Press. 2000. Archived from the original on 2010-07-18.
- James Coleman (Munich: Hatje Cantz, 2002; ed. Susanne Gaensheimer)
- Flesh of My Flesh. Stanford University Press. 2009.
- The Miracle of Analogy: or The History of Photography, Part 1. Stanford University Press. 2015.
