= SF Camerawork =

- Former name: Lamkin Camerawork Gallery
- Established: 1974
- Location: Fort Mason Center, 2 Marina Blvd, Building A, San Francisco, CA 94123
- Coordinates: 37.806749°N 122.432115°W
- Founder: John Lamkin
- Website: www.sfcamerawork.org

SF Camerawork is a non-profit art gallery in San Francisco, California dedicated to new ideas and directions in photography.

== History ==
SF Camerawork was founded in 1974 by John Lamkin and a group of artists, initially calling it "Lamkin Camerawork Gallery".

Allie Haeusslein writes in the British Journal of Photography:

SF Camerawork was founded in 1974 with the mission of promoting emerging photographers and encouraging diverse approaches to the medium; Hal Fischer, Donna-Lee Phillips and Lew Thomas – three influential conceptual photographers of the period – were among those involved in establishing the cooperative organisation. SF Camerawork fearlessly mounted early-career solo exhibitions for Joel-Peter Witkin (1982), Allan Sekula (1985), Uta Barth (1994), Todd Hido (1997), Gregory Halpern (2007) and Meghann Riepenhoff (2016), just a few of the exhibited artists that are now well-known names. It has organised compelling (and, in some cases, prescient) thematic exhibitions about photography in California, photomontage, identity politics, and digital photography.

== Programming ==
According to Artweek:

SF camerawork has a dedicated Education Center and Library, with gallery and forum spaces to engage and to exhibit work by students from First Exposures, SF Camerworks’s photography mentoring program for at-risk youth. The 3,000 volume photography reference library includes many rare and out-of-print publications.

Programming has included the publication, Camerawork: A Journal of Photographic Arts and administration of the James D. Phelan Art Award in Photography.

About Solos, a program which began in 2005, and featured two or three artists in simultaneous solo exhibitions, Artweek writer Amber Whiteside states, “The aim of this new series is to provide a platform that accommodates multiple artists’ visions without forcing them together under a curatorial agenda.”
