= Anodizing =

Metal treatment process

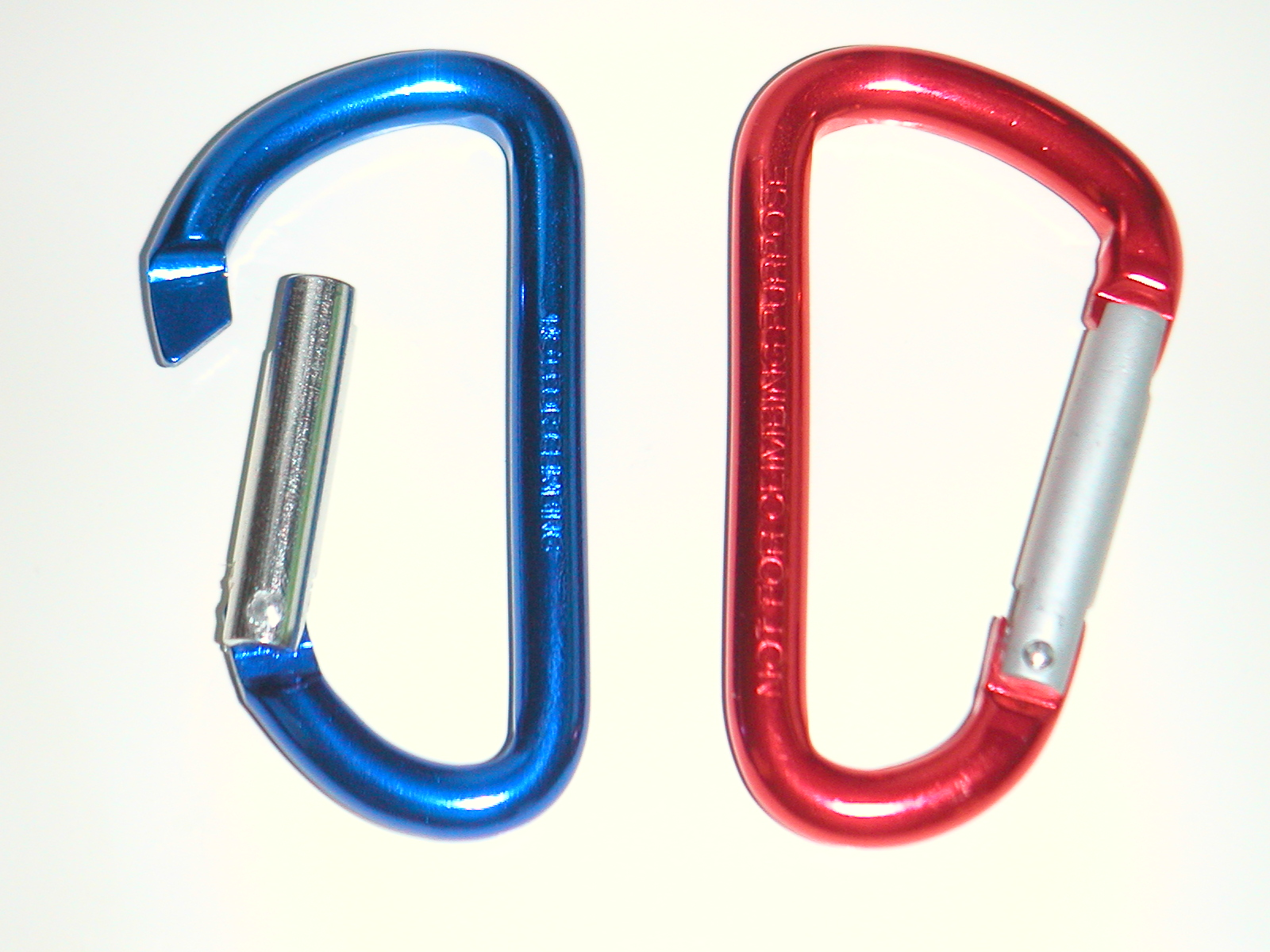
These carabiners have an anodized aluminium surface that has been dyed; they are made in many colors.

Anodizing is an electrolytic passivation process used to increase the thickness of the natural oxide layer on the surface of metal parts.

The process is called anodizing because the part to be treated forms the anode electrode of an electrolytic cell. Anodizing increases resistance to corrosion and wear, and provides better adhesion for paint primers and glues than bare metal does. Anodic films can also be used for several cosmetic effects, either with thick porous coatings that can absorb dyes or with thin coatings whose color is due to thin film interference.

Anodizing is also used to prevent galling of threaded components and to make dielectric films for electrolytic capacitors. Anodic films are most commonly applied to protect aluminium alloys, although processes also exist for titanium, zinc, magnesium, niobium, zirconium, hafnium, and tantalum.

Anodizing changes the microscopic texture of the surface and the crystal structure of the metal near the surface. Thick coatings are normally porous, so a sealing process is often needed to achieve corrosion resistance. Anodized aluminium surfaces, for example, are harder than aluminium but have low to moderate wear resistance that can be improved with increasing thickness or by applying suitable sealing substances. Anodic films are generally much stronger and more adherent than most types of paint and metal plating, but also more brittle. This makes them less likely to crack and peel from ageing and wear, but more susceptible to cracking from thermal stress.

== History ==
Anodizing was first used on an industrial scale in 1923 to protect Duralumin seaplane parts from corrosion. This early chromic acid–based process was called the Bengough–Stuart process and was documented in British defence specification DEF STAN 03-24/3. It is still used today despite its legacy requirements for a complicated voltage cycle now known to be unnecessary. Variations of this process soon evolved, and the first sulfuric acid anodizing process was patented by Gower and O'Brien in 1927. Sulfuric acid soon became and remains the most common anodizing electrolyte.

Oxalic acid anodizing was first patented in Japan in 1923 and later widely used in Germany, particularly for architectural applications. Anodized aluminium extrusion was a popular architectural material in the 1960s and 1970s, but has since been displaced by cheaper plastics and powder coating. The phosphoric acid processes are the most recent major development, so far only used as pretreatments for adhesives or organic paints. A wide variety of proprietary and increasingly complex variations of all these anodizing processes continue to be developed by industry, so the growing trend in military and industrial standards is to classify by coating properties rather than by process chemistry.

== Aluminium ==
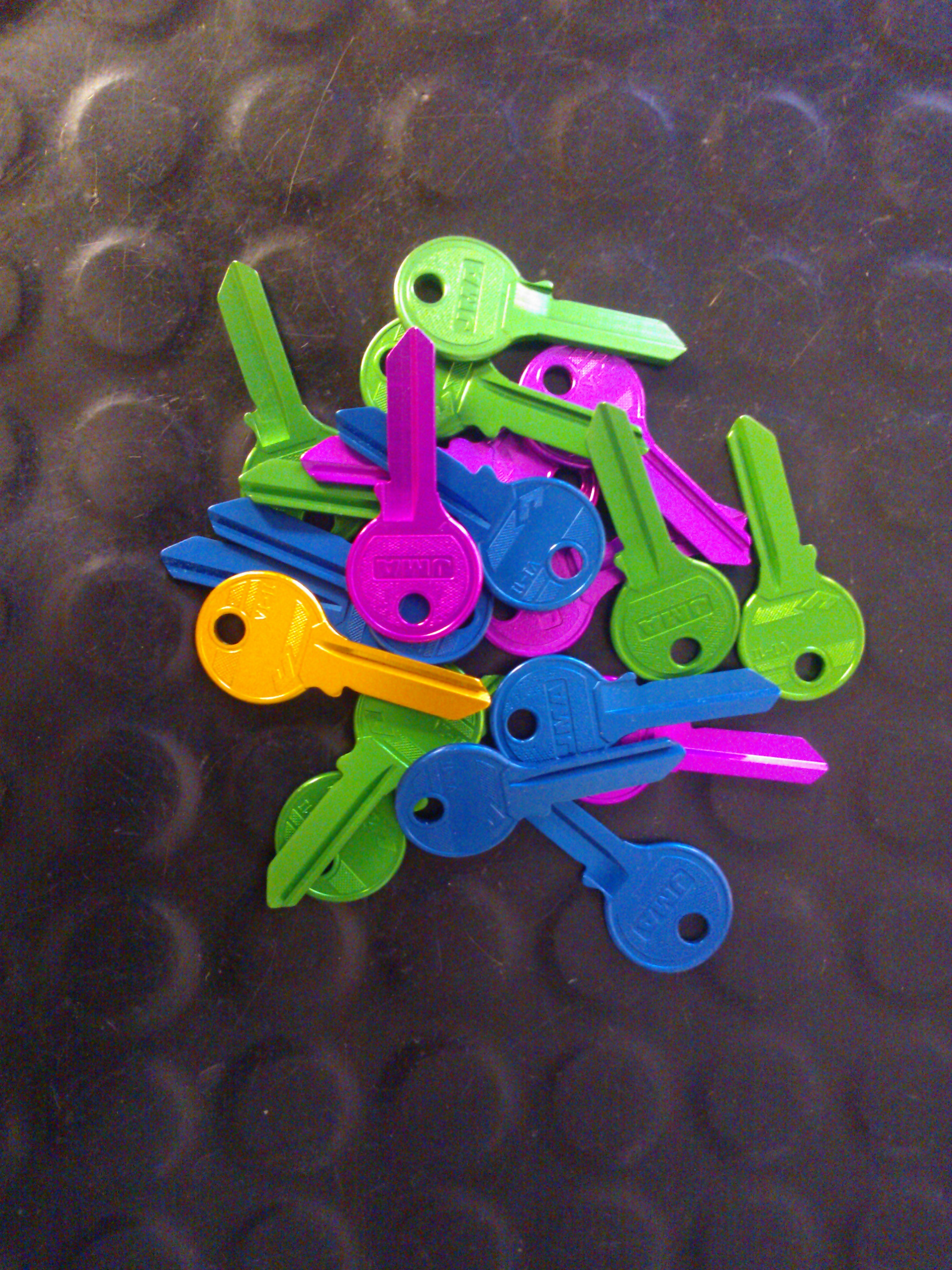
Colored anodized aluminium key blanks

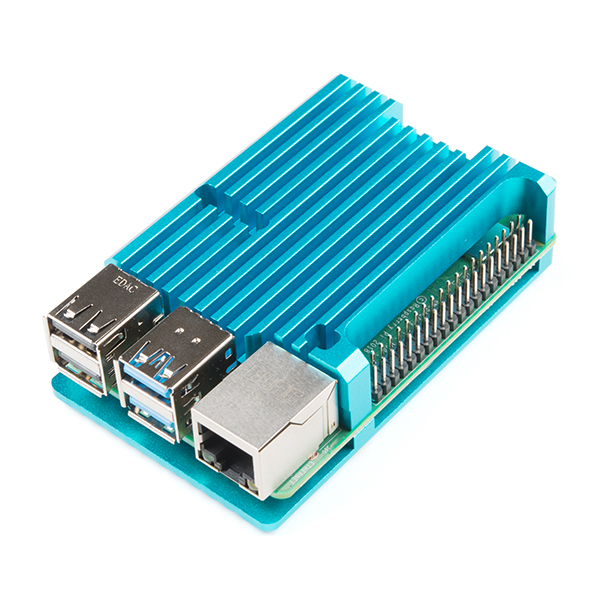
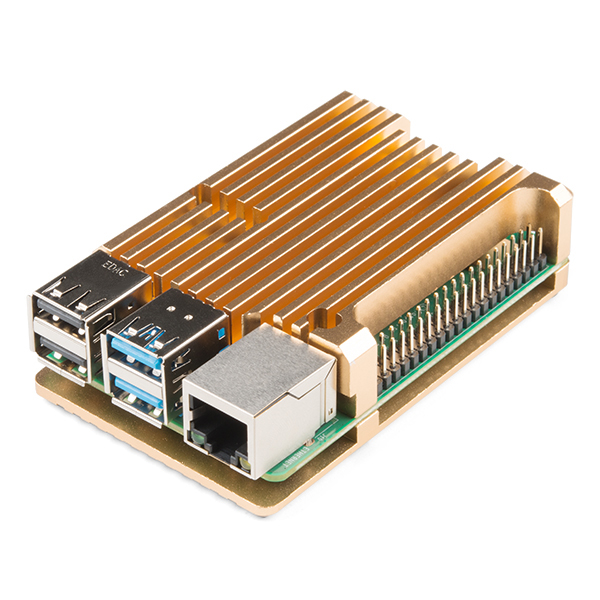
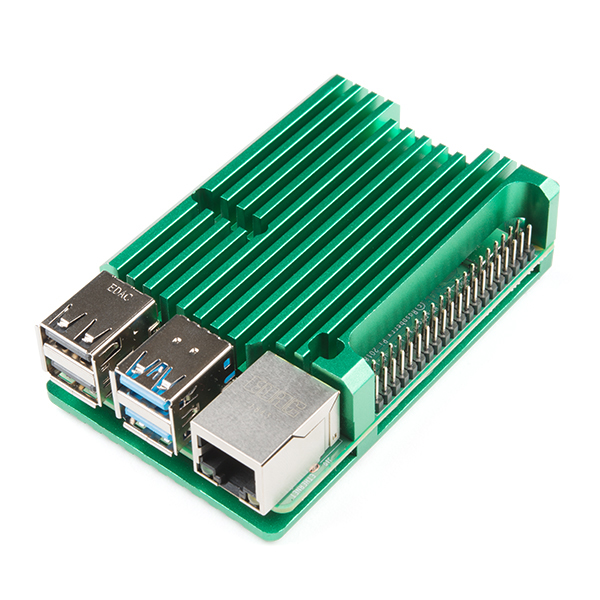
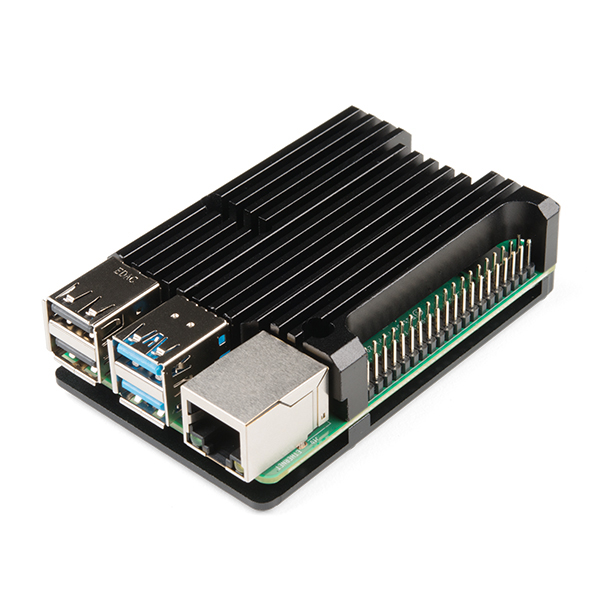
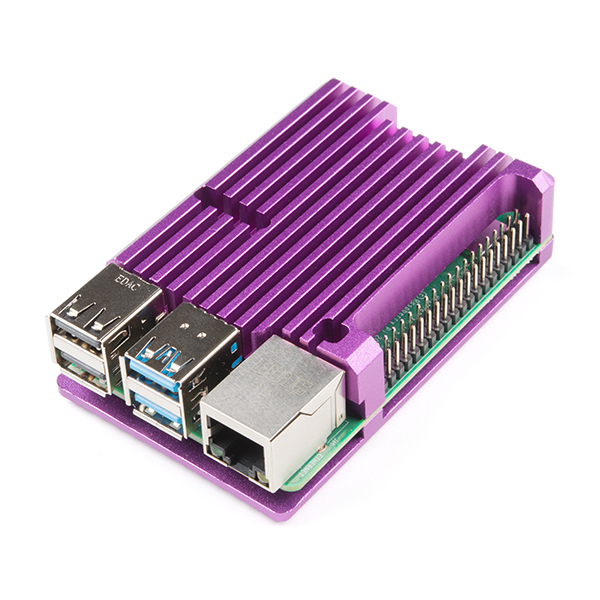
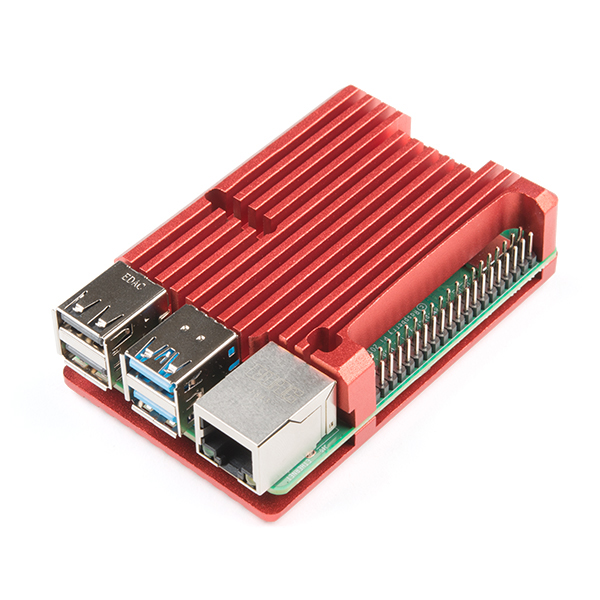
Colored anodized aluminium Raspberry Pi 4 heat sink cases

Aluminium alloys are anodized to increase corrosion resistance and to allow dyeing (coloring), improved lubrication, or improved adhesion. However, anodizing does not increase the strength of the aluminium object. The anodic layer is insulative.

When exposed to air at room temperature, or any other gas containing oxygen, pure aluminium self-passivates by forming a surface layer of amorphous aluminium oxide 2 to 3 nm thick, which provides very effective protection against corrosion. Aluminium alloys typically form a thicker oxide layer, 5–15 nm thick, but tend to be more susceptible to corrosion. Aluminium alloy parts are anodized to greatly increase the thickness of this layer for corrosion resistance. The corrosion resistance of aluminium alloys is significantly decreased by certain alloying elements or impurities: copper, iron, and silicon, so 2000-, 4000-, 6000 and 7000-series Al alloys tend to be most susceptible.

Although anodizing produces a very regular and uniform coating, microscopic fissures in the coating can lead to corrosion. Further, the coating is susceptible to chemical dissolution in the presence of high- and low-pH chemistry, which results in stripping the coating and corrosion of the substrate. To combat this, various techniques have been developed either to reduce the number of fissures, to insert more chemically stable compounds into the oxide, or both. For instance, sulphuric-anodized articles are normally sealed, either through hydro-thermal sealing or precipitating sealing, to reduce porosity and interstitial pathways that allow corrosive ion exchange between the surface and the substrate. Precipitating seals enhance chemical stability but are less effective in eliminating ionic exchange pathways. Most recently, new techniques to partially convert the amorphous oxide coating into more stable micro-crystalline compounds have been developed that have shown significant improvement based on shorter bond lengths.

Some aluminium aircraft parts, architectural materials, and consumer products are anodized. Anodized aluminium can be found on MP3 players, smartphones, multi-tools, flashlights, cookware, cameras, sporting goods, firearms, window frames, roofs, in electrolytic capacitors, and on many other products both for corrosion resistance and the ability to retain dye. Although anodizing only has moderate wear resistance, the deeper pores can better retain a lubricating film than a smooth surface would.

Anodized coatings have a much lower thermal conductivity and coefficient of linear expansion than aluminium. As a result, the coating will crack from thermal stress if exposed to temperatures above 80 °C (353 K). The coating can crack, but it will not peel. The melting point of aluminium oxide is 2050 °C (2323K), much higher than pure aluminium's 658 °C (931K). This and the insulativity of aluminium oxide can make welding more difficult.

In typical commercial aluminium anodizing processes, the aluminium oxide is grown down into the surface and out from the surface by equal amounts. Therefore, anodizing will increase the part dimensions on each surface by half the oxide thickness. For example, a coating that is 2 μm thick will increase the part dimensions by 1 μm per surface. If the part is anodized on all sides, then all linear dimensions will increase by the oxide thickness. Anodized aluminium surfaces are harder than aluminium but have low to moderate wear resistance, although this can be improved with thickness and sealing.

=== Process ===
==== Desmut ====
A desmut solution can be applied to the surface of aluminium to remove contaminants. Nitric acid is typically used to remove smut (residue), but is being replaced because of environmental concerns.

==== Electrolysis ====
The anodized aluminium layer is created by passing a direct current through an electrolytic solution, with the aluminium object serving as the anode (the positive electrode in an electrolytic cell). The current releases hydrogen at the cathode (the negative electrode) and oxygen at the surface of the aluminium anode, creating a build-up of aluminium oxide. Alternating current and pulsed current is also possible but rarely used. The voltage required by various solutions may range from 1 to 300 V DC, although most fall in the range of 15 to 21 V. Higher voltages are typically required for thicker coatings formed in sulfuric and organic acid. The anodizing current varies with the area of aluminium being anodized and typically ranges from 30 to 300 A/m^{2}.

Aluminium anodizing (eloxal or Electrolytic Oxidation of Aluminium) is usually performed in an acidic solution, typically sulphuric acid or chromic acid, which slowly dissolves the aluminium oxide. The acid action is balanced with the oxidation rate to form a coating with nanopores, 10–150 nm in diameter. These pores are what allow the electrolyte solution and current to reach the aluminium substrate and continue growing the coating to greater thickness beyond what is produced by auto-passivation. These pores allow for the dye to be absorbed, however, this must be followed by sealing or the dye will not stay. Dye is typically followed up by a clean nickel acetate seal. Because the dye is only superficial, the underlying oxide may continue to provide corrosion protection even if minor wear and scratches break through the dyed layer.

Conditions such as electrolyte concentration, acidity, solution temperature, and current must be controlled to allow the formation of a consistent oxide layer. Harder, thicker films tend to be produced by more concentrated solutions at lower temperatures with higher voltages and currents. The film thickness can range from under 0.5 micrometers for bright decorative work up to 150 micrometers for architectural applications.

=== Dual-finishing ===
Anodizing can be performed in combination with chromate conversion coating. Each process provides corrosion resistance, with anodizing offering a significant advantage when it comes to ruggedness or physical wear resistance. The reason for combining the processes can vary, however, the significant difference between anodizing and chromate conversion coating is the electrical conductivity of the films produced. Although both stable compounds, chromate conversion coating has a greatly increased electrical conductivity. Applications where this may be useful are varied, however the issue of grounding components as part of a larger system is an obvious one.

The dual finishing process uses the best each process has to offer, anodizing with its hard wear resistance and chromate conversion coating with its electrical conductivity.

The process steps can typically involve chromate conversion coating the entire component, followed by a masking of the surface in areas where the chromate coating must remain intact. Beyond that, the chromate coating is then dissolved in unmasked areas. The component can then be anodized, with anodizing taking to the unmasked areas. The exact process will vary dependent on service provider, component geometry and required outcome. It helps to protect aluminium article.

== Widely used specifications ==
The most widely used anodizing specification in the US is a U.S. military spec, MIL-PRF-8625, which defines three types of aluminium anodizing. Type I is chromic acid anodizing, Type II is sulphuric acid anodizing, and Type III is sulphuric acid hard anodizing. Other anodizing specifications include more MIL-SPECs (e.g., MIL-A-63576), aerospace industry specs by organizations such as SAE, ASTM, and ISO (e.g., AMS 2469, AMS 2470, AMS 2471, AMS 2472, AMS 2482, ASTM B580, ASTM D3933, ISO 10074, and BS 5599), and corporation-specific specs (such as those of Boeing, Lockheed Martin, Airbus and other large contractors). AMS 2468 is obsolete. None of these specifications define a detailed process or chemistry, but rather a set of tests and quality assurance measures which the anodized product must meet. BS 1615 guides the selection of alloys for anodizing. For British defense work, a detailed chromic and sulfuric anodizing processes are described by DEF STAN 03-24/3 and DEF STAN 03-25/3 respectively.

=== Chromic acid (Type I) ===
The oldest anodizing process uses chromic acid. It is widely known as the Bengough-Stuart process but, due to the safety regulations regarding air quality control, is not preferred by vendors when the additive material associated with type II doesn't break tolerances. In North America, it is known as Type I because it is so designated by the MIL-A-8625 standard, but it is also covered by AMS 2470 and MIL-A-8625 Type IB. In the UK it is normally specified as Def Stan 03/24 and used in areas that are prone to come into contact with propellants etc. There are also Boeing and Airbus standards. Chromic acid produces thinner, 0.5 μm to 18 μm (0.00002" to 0.0007") more opaque films that are softer, ductile, and to a degree self-healing. They are harder to dye and may be applied as a pretreatment before painting. The method of film formation is different from using sulfuric acid in that the voltage is ramped up through the process cycle.

=== Sulfuric acid (Type II & III) ===
Sulfuric acid is the most widely used solution to produce an anodized coating. Coatings of moderate thickness 1.8 μm to 25 μm (0.00007" to 0.001") are known as Type II in North America, as named by MIL-A-8625, while coatings thicker than 25 μm (0.001") are known as Type III, hard-coat, hard anodizing, or engineered anodizing. Very thin coatings similar to those produced by chromic anodizing are known as Type IIB. Thick coatings require more process control, and are produced in a refrigerated tank near the freezing point of water with higher voltages than the thinner coatings. Hard anodizing can be made between 13 and 150 μm (0.0005" to 0.006") thick. Anodizing thickness increases wear resistance, corrosion resistance, ability to retain lubricants and PTFE coatings, and electrical and thermal insulation. Sealing Type III will improve corrosion resistance at the cost of reducing abrasion resistance. Sealing will reduce this greatly. Standards for thin (Soft/Standard) sulfuric anodizing are given by MIL-A-8625 Types II and IIB, AMS 2471 (undyed), and AMS 2472 (dyed), BS EN ISO 12373/1 (decorative), BS 3987 (Architectural). Standards for thick sulphuric anodizing are given by MIL-A-8625 Type III, AMS 2469, BS ISO 10074, BS EN 2536 and the obsolete AMS 2468 and DEF STAN 03-26/1.

=== Organic acid ===
Anodizing can produce yellowish integral colors without dyes if it is carried out in weak acids with high voltages, high current densities, and strong refrigeration. Shades of color are restricted to a range which includes pale yellow, gold, deep bronze, brown, grey, and black. Some advanced variations can produce a white coating with 80% reflectivity. The shade of color produced is sensitive to variations in the metallurgy of the underlying alloy and cannot be reproduced consistently.

Anodizing in some organic acids, for example malic acid, can enter a 'runaway' situation, in which the current drives the acid to attack the aluminium far more aggressively than normal, resulting in huge pits and scarring. Also, if the current or voltage are driven too high, 'burning' can set in; in this case, the supplies act as if nearly shorted and large, uneven and amorphous black regions develop.

Integral color anodizing is generally done with organic acids, but the same effect has been produced in laboratories with very dilute sulfuric acid. Integral color anodizing was originally performed with oxalic acid, but sulfonated aromatic compounds containing oxygen, particularly sulfosalicylic acid, have been more common since the 1960s. Thicknesses of up to 50 μm can be achieved. Organic acid anodizing is called Type IC by MIL-A-8625.

=== Phosphoric acid ===
Anodizing can be carried out in phosphoric acid, usually as a surface preparation for adhesives. This is described in standard ASTM D3933.

=== Borate and tartrate baths ===
Anodizing can also be performed in borate or tartrate baths in which aluminium oxide is insoluble. In these processes, the coating growth stops when the part is fully covered, and the thickness is linearly related to the voltage applied. These coatings are free of pores, relative to the sulfuric and chromic acid processes. This type of coating is widely used to make electrolytic capacitors because the thin aluminium films (typically less than 0.5 μm) would risk being pierced by acidic processes.

=== Plasma electrolytic oxidation ===
Plasma electrolytic oxidation is a similar process, but where higher voltages are applied. This causes sparks to occur and results in more crystalline/ceramic type coatings.

== Other metals ==
=== Iron ===
Iron or carbon steel metal exfoliates when oxidized under neutral or alkaline micro-electrolytic conditions; i.e., the iron oxide (actually ferric hydroxide or hydrated iron oxide, also known as rust) forms by anoxic anodic pits and large cathodic surface, these pits concentrate anions such as sulfate and chloride accelerating the underlying metal to corrosion. Carbon flakes or nodules in iron or steel with high carbon content (high-carbon steel, cast iron) may cause an electrolytic potential and interfere with coating or plating. Ferrous metals are commonly anodized electrolytically in nitric acid or by treatment with red fuming nitric acid to form hard black Iron(II,III) oxide. This oxide remains conformal even when plated on wiring and the wiring is bent.

=== Magnesium ===
Magnesium is anodized primarily as a primer for paint. A thin (5 μm) film is sufficient for this. Thicker coatings of 25 μm and up can provide mild corrosion resistance when sealed with oil, wax, or sodium silicate. Standards for magnesium anodizing are given in AMS 2466, AMS 2478, AMS 2479, and ASTM B893.

=== Niobium ===
Niobium anodizes in a similar fashion to titanium with a range of attractive colors being formed by interference at different film thicknesses. Again the film thickness is dependent on the anodizing voltage. Uses include jewelry and commemorative coins.

=== Stainless steel ===
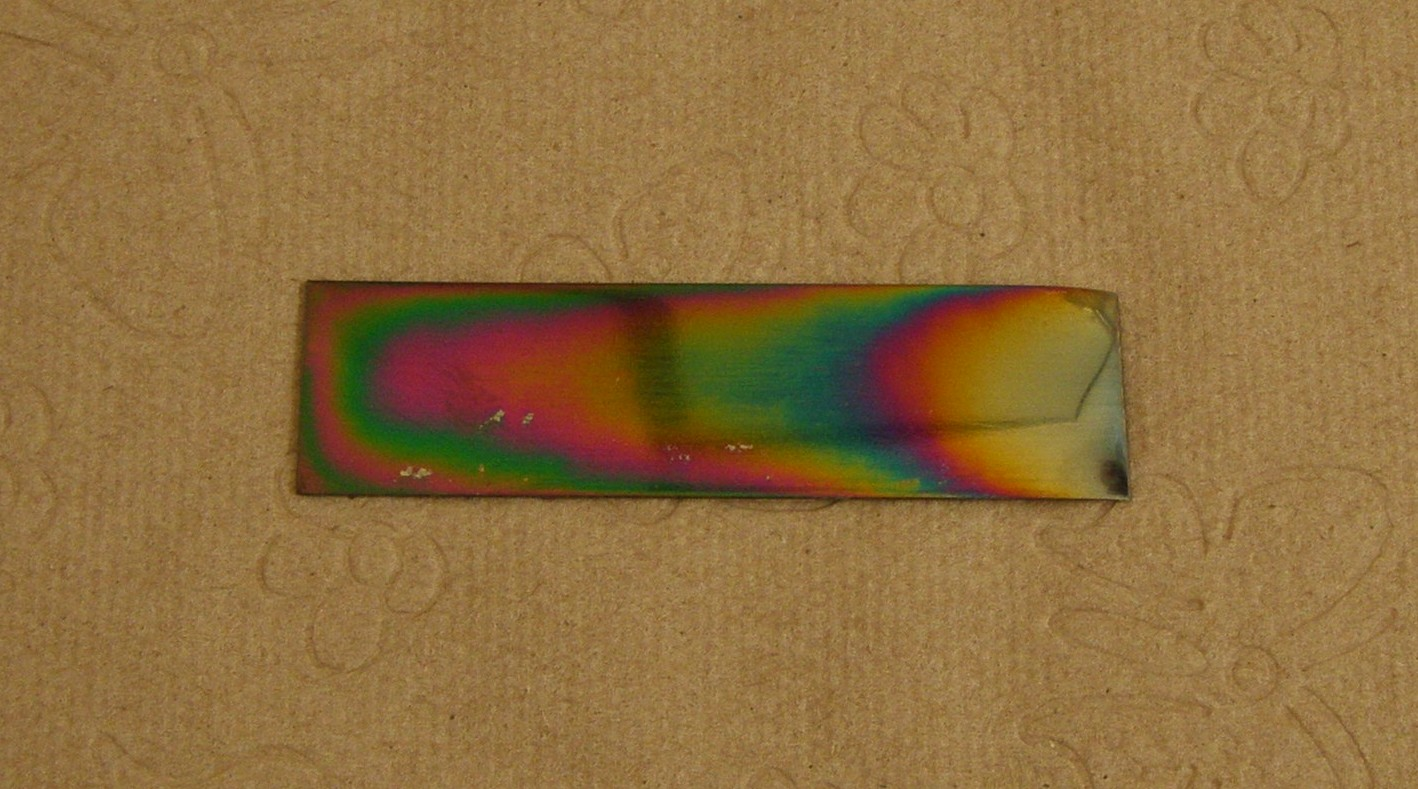
Anodized stainless steel test plate (molybdate-based solution)

Stainless steel can be anodized in baths containing sulphuric acid and hexavalent chromium compounds. Baths containing NaOH or KOH solutions can be used too. As hexavalent chromium compounds are prohibited for use in the EU based on ROHS regulations and are toxic and carcinogenic, solutions based on molybdate are proposed as a replacement (e.g. molybdate 30-100g/ boric acid 10-18 g/manganese sulfate 0.5 - 5 g/1 liter of water, 0.1 - 20 A/dm2, 0.1–15 minutes).

=== Tantalum ===
Tantalum anodizes similarly to titanium and niobium with a range of attractive colors being formed by interference at different film thicknesses. Again the film thickness is dependent on the anodizing voltage and typically ranges from 18 to 23 Angstroms per volt depending on electrolyte and temperature. Uses include tantalum capacitors.

=== Titanium ===
Selected colors achievable through anodization of titanium

An anodized oxide layer has a thickness in the range of 30 nanometers (1.2×10^{−6} in) to several micrometers. Standards for titanium anodizing are given by AMS 2487 and AMS 2488.

AMS 2488 Type III anodizing of titanium generates an array of different colors without dyes, for which it is sometimes used in art, costume jewellery, body piercing jewellery and wedding rings. The color formed is dependent on the thickness of the oxide (which is determined by the anodizing voltage); it is caused by the interference of light reflecting off the oxide surface with light travelling through it and reflecting off the underlying metal surface. AMS 2488 Type II anodizing produces a thicker matte grey finish with higher wear resistance.

=== Zinc ===
Zinc is rarely anodized, but a process was developed by the International Lead Zinc Research Organization and covered by MIL-A-81801. A solution of ammonium phosphate, chromate and fluoride with voltages of up to 200 V can produce olive green coatings up to 80 μm thick. The coatings are hard and corrosion resistant.

Zinc or galvanized steel can be anodized using DC at lower voltages (20–30 V) in silicate baths containing varying concentrations of sodium silicate, sodium hydroxide, borax, sodium nitrite, and nickel sulfate.

== Medical applications ==
Anodizing is used in the manufacture of medical devices and equipment, particularly for components made from titanium and aluminium.

=== Titanium ===
Titanium and titanium-alloy medical devices may be anodized to produce different surface colors, allowing components to be visually distinguished. In titanium, anodic coloration results from changes in the thickness of the oxide layer rather than from the incorporation of dyes. Anodized Ti-6Al-4V is used for color coding of medical devices, including orthopedic implants.

Anodization is also used as a surface-modification technique for titanium implants. Depending on the process conditions, anodic oxidation can alter the thickness, structure, roughness, wettability and topography of the titanium oxide surface. Anodized titanium surfaces, including micro- and nanoscale structures such as titanium dioxide nanotubes, have been investigated for their effects on cellular response, bioactivity and osseointegration.

In dental implant applications, anodization is also used to modify the appearance and surface characteristics of titanium abutments. Pink or yellow anodized titanium can reduce the visible gray coloration associated with untreated titanium through peri-implant soft tissue. Anodization can also alter surface chemistry and wettability. A 2026 review found that anodization generally improved optical masking of titanium, while evidence for sustained clinical biological benefits remained limited.

=== Aluminium ===
Anodized aluminium is used in medical and surgical devices where the surface finish may be required to withstand repeated cleaning and sterilization. In these applications, chemical resistance is an important consideration because reusable components may be repeatedly exposed to sterilization processes and alkaline cleaning agents. Anodizing also allows colorants to be incorporated into the oxide layer. Color can be used to distinguish between medical devices, components or controls as part of device identification and human factors design.

For reusable medical devices, specialized anodizing processes can increase the resistance of aluminium surfaces to repeated cleaning and sterilization while retaining the material's relatively low weight and other mechanical characteristics. Aluminium components are used in medical applications including orthopedic fixation devices, endoscopic equipment and robotic surgical systems.

== Dyeing ==
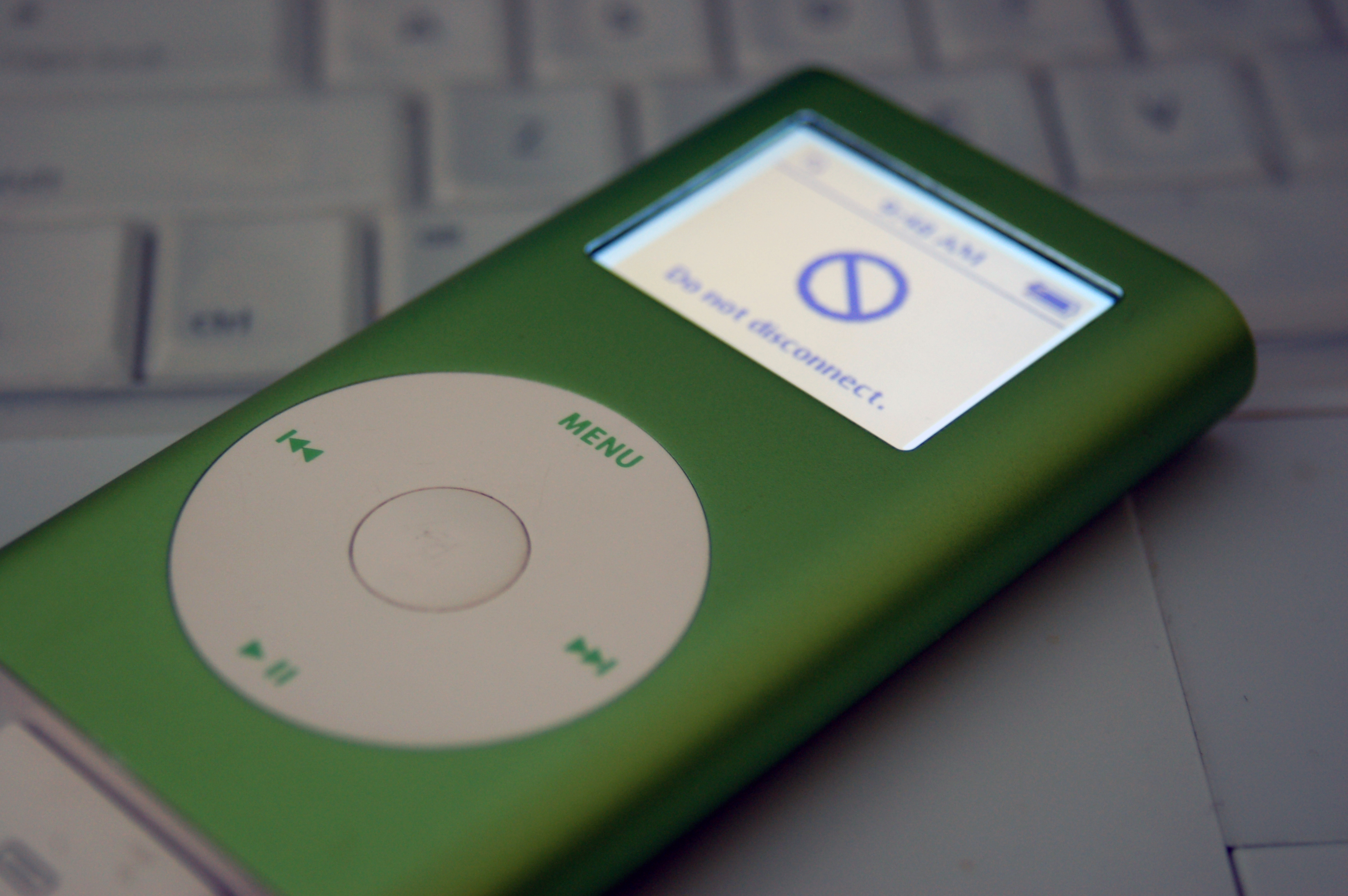
Colored iPod Mini cases are dyed following anodizing and before thermal sealing.

The most common anodizing processes, for example, sulphuric acid on aluminium, produce a porous surface which can accept dyes easily. The number of dye colors is almost endless; however, the colors produced tend to vary according to the base alloy. The most common colors in the industry, due to them being relatively cheap, are yellow, green, blue, black, orange, purple and red. Though some may prefer lighter colors, in practice, they may be difficult to produce on certain alloys such as high-silicon casting grades and 2000-series aluminium-copper alloys. Another concern is the "lightfastness" of organic dyestuffs—some colors (reds and blues) are particularly prone to fading. Black dyes and gold produced by inorganic means (ferric ammonium oxalate) are more lightfast. Dyed anodizing is usually sealed to reduce or eliminate dye bleedout. White color cannot be applied due to the larger molecule size than the pore size of the oxide layer.

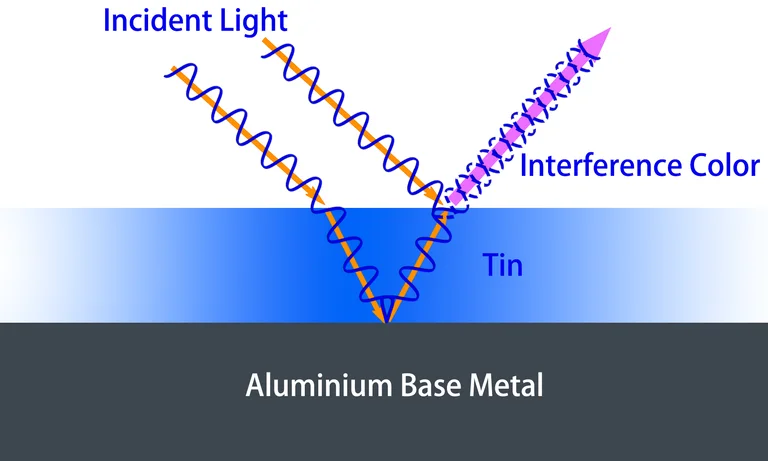
Anodizing interference colors

Another interesting coloring method is anodizing interference coloring. The thin oil film resting on the water's surface displays a rainbow hue due to the interference between light reflected from the water-oil interface and the oil film's surface. Because the oil film's thickness isn't regulated, the resulting rainbow color appears random.

In the anodizing coloring of aluminum, desired colors are achieved by depositing a controllably thick metal layer (typically tin) at the base of the porous structure. This involves reflections on the aluminum substrate and the upper metal surface. The color resulting from interference shifts from blue, green, and yellow to red as the deposited metal layer thickens. Beyond a specific thickness, the optical interference vanishes, and the color turns bronze. Interference-colored anodized aluminum parts exhibit a distinctive quality: their color varies when viewed from different angles. The interference coloring involves a 3-step process: sulfuric acid anodizing, electrochemical modification of the anodic pore, and metal (tin) deposition.

== Sealing ==
Sealing is the final step in the anodizing process. Acidic anodizing solutions produce pores in the anodized coating. These pores can absorb dyes and retain lubricants, but are also an avenue for corrosion. When lubrication properties are not critical, they are usually sealed after dyeing to increase corrosion resistance and dye retention. There are three most common types of sealing.

1. Long immersion in boiling-hot—96–100 °C (205–212 °F)—deionized water or steam is the simplest sealing process, although it is not completely effective and reduces abrasion resistance by 20%. The oxide is converted into its hydrated form and the resulting swelling reduces the porosity of the surface.
2. Mid-temperature sealing process which works at 160–180 °F (70–80 °C) in solutions containing organic additives and metal salts. However, this process will likely leach the colors.
3. Cold sealing process, where the pores are closed by impregnation of a sealant in a room-temperature bath, is more popular due to energy savings. Coatings sealed in this method are not suitable for adhesive bonding. Teflon, nickel acetate, cobalt acetate, and hot sodium or potassium dichromate seals are commonly used. MIL-A-8625 requires sealing for thin coatings (Types I and II) and allows it as an option for thick ones (Type III).

== Cleaning ==
Anodized aluminium surfaces that are not regularly cleaned are susceptible to panel edge staining, a unique type of surface staining that can affect the structural integrity of the metal.

== Environmental impact ==
Anodizing is one of the more environmentally friendly metal finishing processes. Except for organic (aka integral color) anodizing, the by-products contain only small amounts of heavy metals, halogens, or volatile organic compounds. Integral color anodizing produces no VOCs, heavy metals, or halogens as all of the byproducts found in the effluent streams of other processes come from their dyes or plating materials. The most common anodizing effluents, aluminium hydroxide and aluminium sulfate, are recycled for the manufacturing of alum, baking powder, cosmetics, newsprint and fertilizer or used by industrial wastewater treatment systems.

== Mechanical considerations ==
Anodizing will raise the surface since the oxide created occupies more space than the base metal converted. This will generally not be of consequence except where there are tight tolerances. If so, the thickness of the anodizing layer has to be taken into account when choosing the machining dimension. A general practice on engineering drawing is to specify that "dimensions apply after all surface finishes". This will force the machine shop to take into account the anodization thickness when performing the final machining of the mechanical part before anodization. Also, in the case of small holes threaded to accept screws, anodizing may cause the screws to bind, thus, the threaded holes may need to be chased with a tap to restore the original dimensions. Alternatively, special oversize taps may be used to precompensate for this growth. In the case of unthreaded holes that accept fixed-diameter pins or rods, a slightly oversized hole to allow for the dimension change may be appropriate. Depending on the alloy and thickness of the anodized coating, the same may have a significantly negative effect on fatigue life. Conversely, anodizing may increase fatigue life by preventing corrosion pitting.

== See also ==
- Black oxide
- Electrochemical coloring of metals
- Phosphate conversion coating
