= Meghann Riepenhoff =

American photographer

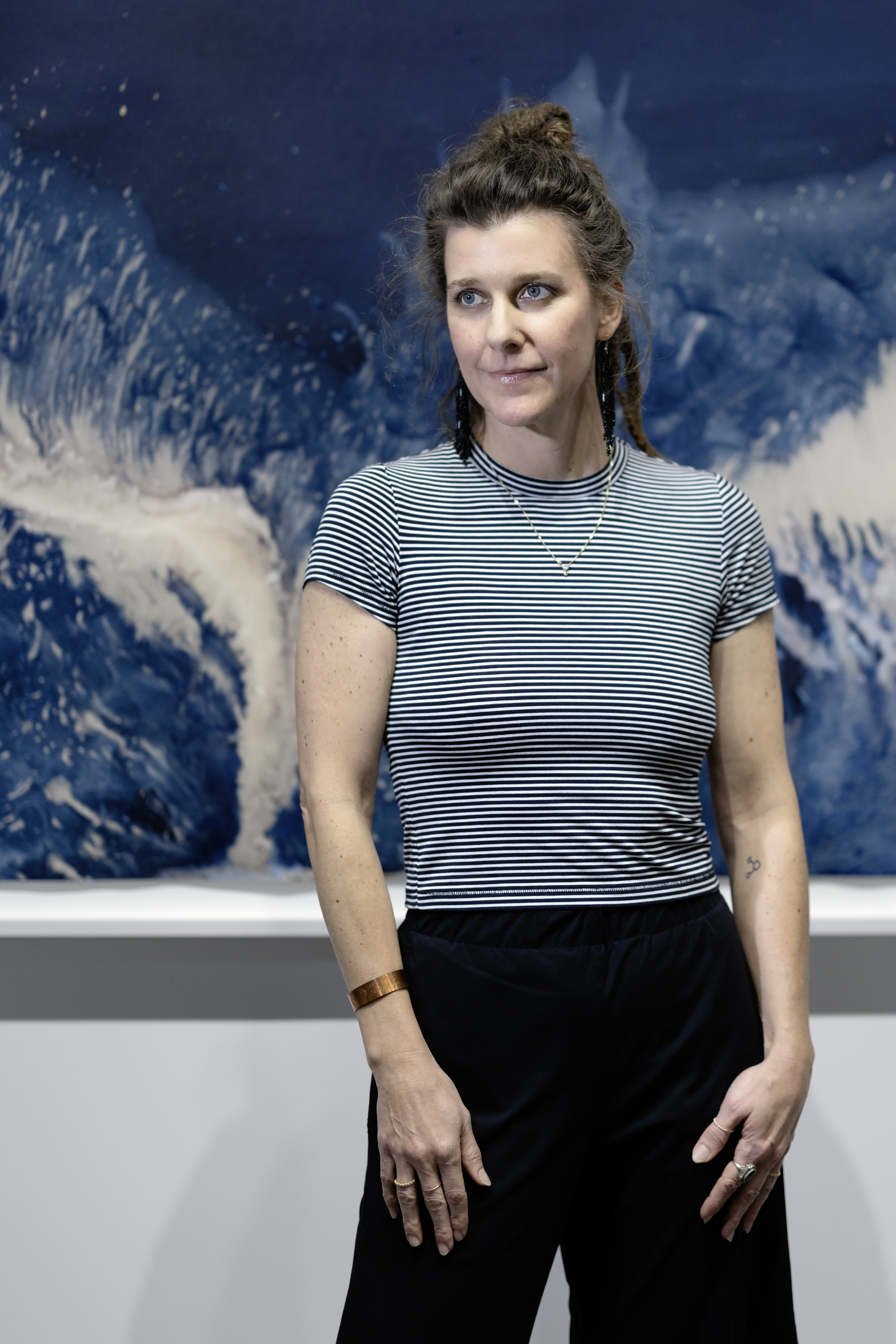
Riepenhoff in 2025

Meghann Riepenhoff (born 1979) is an American photographer, living in Bainbridge Island, Washington, and San Francisco, California, who makes camera-less cyanotypes. She has produced the books Littoral Drift + Ecotone (2018) and Ice (2022). Her work is held in the collections of the High Museum of Art and San Francisco Museum of Modern Art and in 2018 she received a Guggenheim Fellowship.

== Life and work ==
Riepenhoff is from Atlanta, GA. She received a BFA in photography from the University of Georgia, and an MFA from San Francisco Art Institute. She lives in Bainbridge Island, Washington, and San Francisco, California.

She makes camera-less cyanotypes in collaboration with the landscape and the ocean. "Riepenhoff utilises waves, rain, wind and sediment in her process, creating physical inscriptions through the direct contact of these natural phenomena with her photographic materials".

== Publications ==
- Littoral Drift + Ecotone. Santa Fe, New Mexico: Radius; New York City: Yossi Milo, 2018. ISBN 9781942185468.
- Ice. Santa Fe, New Mexico: Radius; New York City: Yossi Milo, 2022. Photography by Riepenhoff, text by Rebecca Solnit. ISBN 9781942185864.

== Group exhibitions ==
- Cyanotypes: Photography's Blue Period, Worcester Art Museum, Worcester, MA, 2016
- New Territory: Landscape Photography Today, Denver Art Museum, Denver, CO, 2018

== Awards ==
- 2018: Guggenheim Fellowship from the John Simon Guggenheim Memorial Foundation

== Collections ==
Riepenhoff's work is held in the following permanent collections:

- High Museum of Art, New York: 2 prints (as of 14 March 2023)
- San Francisco Museum of Modern Art, San Francisco, CA: 1 print (as of 14 March 2023)
- Worcester Art Museum, Worcester, MA: 1 print (as of 14 March 2023)
