= John Dugdale (photographer) =

American art photographer

- Born: 1960 (age 65–66); Connecticut, United States
- Education: School of the Visual Arts, New York City
- Known for: Cyanotype photography
- Notable work: Lengthening Shadows Before Nightfall (1995); The Clandestine Mind (21st Editions)
- Awards: Fellow, Royal Photographic Society

John Dugdale (born 1960 in Connecticut) is an American art photographer. He is known for creating cyanotype prints as he started to lose his eyesight. His works are the focus of the book The Clandestine Mind, Volume III of The Journal of Contemporary Photography series published by 21st Editions.

== Early life and career ==
Dugdale's interest in photography started at the age of twelve with his first camera, which was a present from his mother. He attended the School of the Visual Arts in New York City where he majored in photography and art history. In 1983 his photographic work was first presented in a solo exhibition at Vienna's Molotov Art Gallery. The show and the catalogue were curated by Christian Michelides. Thereafter he started a successful decade long commercial career working for such clients as Bergdorf Goodman, Martha Stewart, and Ralph Lauren.

== Blindness ==
In 1993, at age 33, Dugdale became nearly total blind due to a stroke and CMV retinitis, an HIV-related illness. He became completely blind in his right eye and lost eighty percent visibility in his left eye. In 2010 he lost his remaining vision.

Blindness ended his successful commercial photography career, but he decided to persist in photography and started to explore techniques from the 19th century for fine art photography, in order to use older, less harsh photochemistry, and enlisting friends and family as assistants.

== New use of old photography ==
Since then Dugdale has worked with large format cameras, creating cyanotype prints – platinum prints – using the albumen process which became the predominant technique for positive photography from 1855 to the turn of the 20th century. His sensibility for bygone techniques emphasizes the poetics of his work and the transcendence of time and place; seemingly transporting the imagery to a different era. A quote of the nearly blind photographer:

"The mind is the essence of your sight. It's really the mind that sees."

Dugdale has exhibited in over 25 solo shows in galleries all over the world. One of the better known solo exhibits was called Lengthening Shadows Before Nightfall (1995). His work has been seen in group shows at the Miami Art Museum, at the High Museum of Art in Atlanta and at the Aldrich Contemporary Art Museum in Ridgefield; his photographs are included in the collections of the Metropolitan Museum of Art and The Whitney Museum in New York as well as in the Museum of Fine Arts, Houston. The artist has been inducted into the Royal Photographic Society in Bath and he spoke on BBC, NPR, at universities and other public and private events where he continues to discuss 19th century photographic processes as well as his own aesthetic point of view – answering questions pertaining to what it means "to see."

Dugdale continues to skim the beautiful surface of his deeper concerns – spirituality, death, interior decoration – so his ultra refined Neo-Victorian sensibility and exquisite prints can be quite seductive.

— Vince Aletti (1993)
