= Erin Shirreff =

Canadian artist

- Born: 1975 (age 50–51); Kelowna, British Columbia
- Education: University of Victoria; Yale University School of Art

Erin Shirreff (born 1975) is a Canadian artist who works primarily in photography, sculpture, and video.

== Early life and education ==
Shireff was born in 1975 in Kelowna, British Columbia. Shirreff received her Bachelor of Fine Arts from the University of Victoria in Visual Arts. She received her Masters of Fine Arts in Sculpture from the Yale University School of Art.

== Solo exhibitions ==
- Milwaukee Art Museum (2025)
- Institute of Contemporary Art in Boston Massachusetts (2015)
- White Cube in London, United Kingdom (2013)

== Awards ==
In 2005, Shirreff received The Hayward Prize for Fine Arts from The Austrian-American Foundation. In 2011, Shirreff was the recipient of both The Louis Comfort Tiffany Foundation Grant. She has also won the Aimia/AGO Photography Prize from the Art Gallery of Ontario.

== Collections ==
Shirreff's work is included in the collection of the Guggenheim Museum, New York, the Institute of Contemporary Art, Boston and the Albright-Knox Art Gallery, Buffalo, New York.
