= Panel edge staining =

Degradation process occurring in exposed aluminum and steel panelling

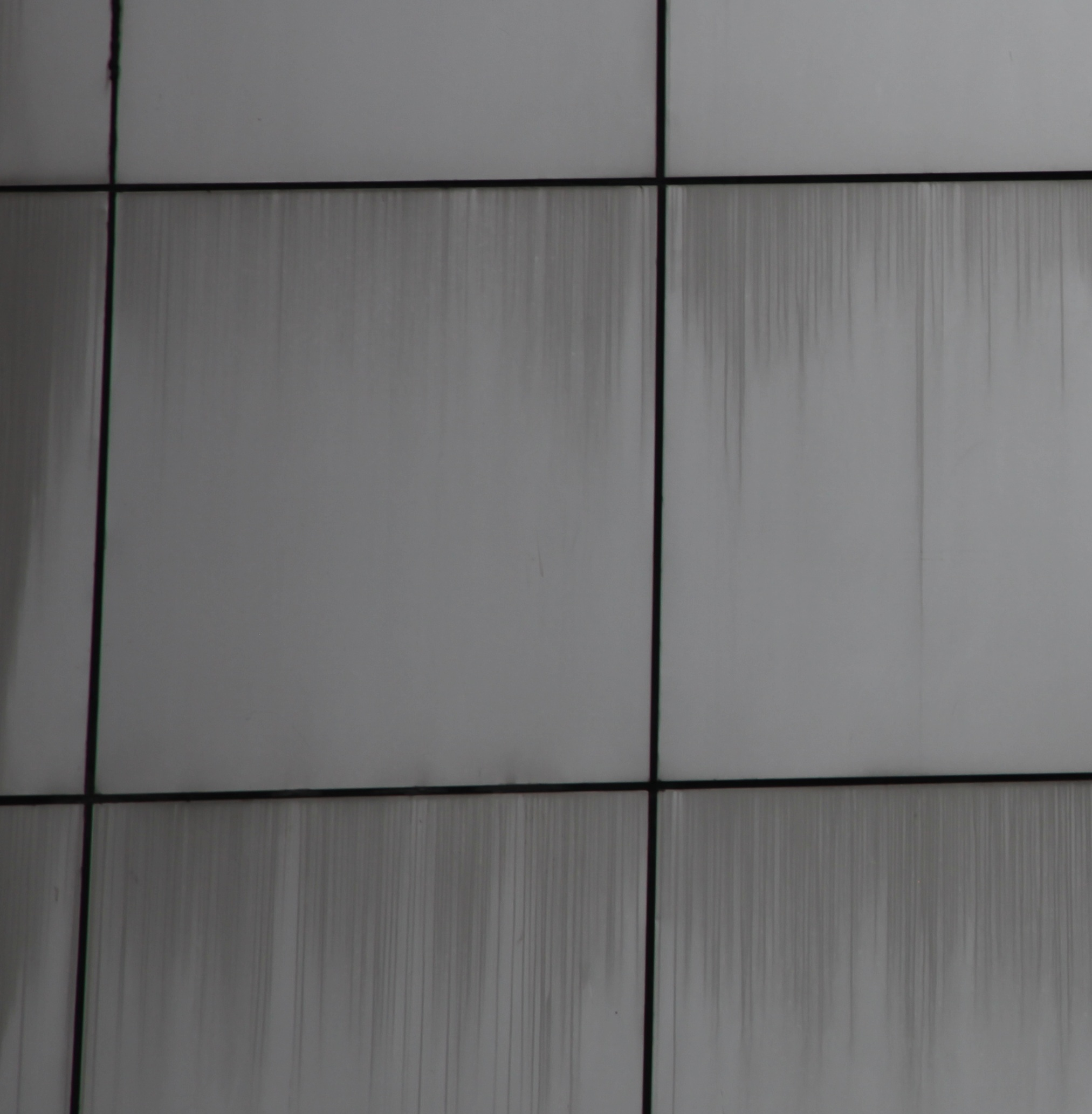
Panel edge staining

Panel edge staining is a naturally occurring problem that occurs to anodized aluminium and stainless steel panelling and façades. It is semi-permanent staining that dulls the panel or façade's surface (in particular the edges of the panelling), reducing the natural lustre and shine produced by the anodizing processes used on the aluminium. Panel edge staining may also appear on powder coated aluminium, painted aluminium, stainless steel and titanium surfaces.

== Causes ==
Panel edge staining is the by-product of the build-up of dirt and pollution. It is especially more noticeable on buildings using metallic façades in Asia, and regions close to the equator (such as Florida or South East Asia), as higher rates of air pollution, high levels of humidity and consistent rainfall encourage panel edge staining to develop.

The unique top-to-bottom stain pattern of panel edge staining is caused when the build-up of dirt and pollution is washed from the higher panels to the lower panels of a surface by natural precipitation.
