= Ferric ammonium oxalate =

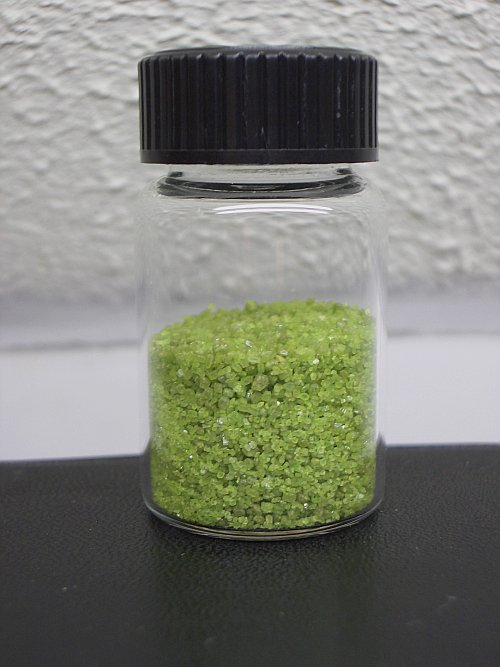

Names
- Other names: ammonium ferrioxalate; ammonium tris(oxalato)ferrate

Identifiers
CAS Number	14221-47-7; 13268-42-3 triammonium ferric trioxalate trihydrate
3D model (JSmol)	Interactive image
ChemSpider	24761
ECHA InfoCard	100.034.612
EC Number	238-090-0
PubChem CID	26580
UNII	9437980SQM
UN number	3077
CompTox Dashboard (EPA)	DTXSID80890522
- InChI: InChI=1S/3C2H2O4.Fe.3H3N/c3*3-1(4)2(5)6;;;;/h3*(H,3,4)(H,5,6);;3*1H3/q;;;+3;;;/p-3 Key: UEUDBBQFZIMOQJ-UHFFFAOYSA-K
- SMILES: C(=O)(C(=O)[O-])[O-].C(=O)(C(=O)[O-])[O-].C(=O)(C(=O)[O-])[O-].[NH4+].[NH4+].[NH4+].[Fe+3]

Properties
Chemical formula	C_{6}H_{12}FeN_{3}O_{12}
Molar mass	374.016 g·mol^{−1}
Appearance	green solid
Solubility in water	soluble
Solubility in ethanol	insoluble

Hazards
- GHS labelling
Pictograms	(GHS07: Exclamation mark)
Signal word	Warning
Hazard statements	H302, H312, H315, H319, H332, H335
Precautionary statements	P261, P264, P270, P271, P280, P301+P312, P302+P352, P304+P312, P304+P340, P305+P351+P338, P312, P321, P322, P330, P332+P313, P337+P313, P362, P363, P403+P233, P405, P501
NFPA 704 (fire diamond)	2 1 0
Safety data sheet (SDS)	External MSDS

Related compounds
Other cations	Potassium ferrioxalate
- Except where otherwise noted, data are given for materials in their standard state (at 25 °C [77 °F], 100 kPa). Infobox references

Ferric ammonium oxalate (also known as ammonium ferrioxalate or ammonium tris(oxalato)ferrate) is the ammonium salt of the anionic trisoxalato coordination complex of iron(III). It is a precursor to iron oxides, diverse coordination polymers, and Prussian blue. The latter behavior is relevant to the manufacture of blueprint paper. Ferric ammonium oxalate has also been used in the synthesis of superconducting salts with bis(ethylene)dithiotetrathiafulvalene (BEDT-TTF), see organic superconductor.
