= Villarejo (disambiguation) =

Villarejo may refer to:

== Association football ==
- Copa Luis Villarejo, association football league in Puerto Rico
- 2016 Copa Luis Villarejo, football tournament season

== People ==
- Carlos Jiménez Villarejo (born 1935), Spanish politician
- Don Villarejo (1937–2021), American physicist and social justice leader
- José Manuel Villarejo (born 1951), Spanish businessman and former officer of Spanish National Police
- Miguel Villarejo (born 1988), Spanish footballer

== Places ==
- Villarejo, La Rioja, Spain
- Villarejo de Fuentes, Cuenca, Castilla-La Mancha, Spain
- Villarejo de Salvanés, Madrid, Spain
- Villarejo-Periesteban, Cuenca, Castilla-La Mancha, Spain
- Villarejo de Montalbán, Toledo, Castilla-La Mancha, Spain
- Villarejo del Valle, Ávila, Castilla y León, Spain
- Villarejo de la Peñuela, Cuenca, Castilla-La Mancha, Spain
- Villarejo de Órbigo, León, Castilla y León, Spain
