= Pinkel (surname) =

Pinkel is a Dutch and North German surname, probably a variant of Pingel. It may refer to the following notable people:

- Donald Pinkel (1926–2022), American physician
- Gary Pinkel (born 1952), American college football coach
- Sheila Pinkel (born 1941), American visual artist, activist and educator
