= Giovanni Nesi =

Giovanni Nesi may refer to:

- Giovanni Nesi (philosopher) (1456–1506)
- Giovanni Nesi (pianist) (born 1986)
