= Juraj Dragišić =

Bosnian Franciscan theologian and philosopher

A possible portrait of Dragišić at the start of his Opus de natura caelestium spirituum quos angelos voca, a deluxe incunabulum printed at Florence in 1499

Juraj Dragišić (c. 1445–1520), known in Italian as Giorgio Benigno Salviati (Latin: Georgius Benignus de Salviatis), was a Bosnian Franciscan theologian and philosopher of the Renaissance. He was educated in Italy, France and England. He lived and worked in Rome, Urbino, Florence and Dubrovnik (Ragusa), in addition to a long diplomatic stay in Germany. He held several high Franciscan offices and in his later years was the bishop of Cagli (1507–1520) and titular archbishop of Nazareth (1512–1520).

A prolific Neo-Latin writer, Dragišić wrote mostly on theology and philosophy. He was partial to the dialogue form. Theologically he was a Scotist and philosophically a Platonist. He readily entered into live controversies, defending Bessarion against charges of heresy, entering the Plato–Aristotle controversy, debating the problem of future contingents and the problem of evil, defending the prophecies of Girolamo Savonarola, defending Johannes Reuchlin and the Talmud and defending Duke Francesco Maria of Urbino against the charge of murder.

== Life ==
=== Origins ===
Juraj's native surname, Dragišić (Draghisic), is known only from two letters, one from Pope Innocent VIII (1490) and another from the Republic of Florence (1491). He himself never uses his family name in his surviving writings. In the earliest surviving documents, he is also called de Argentina or de Burgo Argentina after the Latin name of Srebrenica. He used this name himself, as well as many others indicating his Balkan origin: de Bosnia, Grecus de Bosnia ('the Greek of Bosnia'), Macedonus ('the Macedonian'), de Macedonia, etc.

There was a noble Dragišić family in Bosnia, but it is unknown if Juraj was related to them. The sons of Duke Ivaniš Dragišić were prominent in the reign of King Thomas of Bosnia (r. 1443–1461). The coronation of his son, Stephen II, was attended by a Marko Dragišić. Juraj's father's name was Laetus, which is a Latinization of a Slavic name, either Radoslav or Veselko. No Dragišić of those names is otherwise recorded.

Dragišić was born in Srebrenica in the Kingdom of Bosnia, but the year of his birth is uncertain. Several data have been used to estimate his birth year: his being a deacon in 1464, the minimum age for which was 20, yielding a birthdate of 1444; his claim to have been 23 years old when he wrote in defence of Bessarion, usually dated to 1469–1471, yielding a birthdate in the years 1446–1448; and his ordination as a priest in 1469, the canonical age for which was 25 for Franciscans, placing his birth no later than 1445.

The only direct information on Dragišić's early life is that which he included in his De natura angelica, published in 1499. He joined the Franciscan convent in Srebrenica, which was subject to the custos (custodian) of Usora. He would have received a basic education at the convent. He was probably a Conventual Franciscan, since they were the dominant faction in the Balkan provinces.

Sometime between 1462 and 1464, Dragišić fled Srebrenica for the coast during the Ottoman invasion of Bosnia. Although it is sometimes held that he fled as a child with his family to Dubrovnik, this seems to be based on a misreading of the preface to De natura angelica. He seems rather to have settled first in Jajce and then in Zadar. In September 1464, Marco Fantuzzi da Bologna, vicar general of the Observant Franciscans, stopped in Zadar and was invited to participate in a provincial council being held by Bernardino d'Aquila on the island of Pašman. There he was petitioned to take back two Italy two young Franciscans, Dragišić, already a deacon, and the subdeacon Ivan of Jezero. By 1 October 1464, Dragišić was in Ferrara in Italy.

=== Rome and Urbino ===
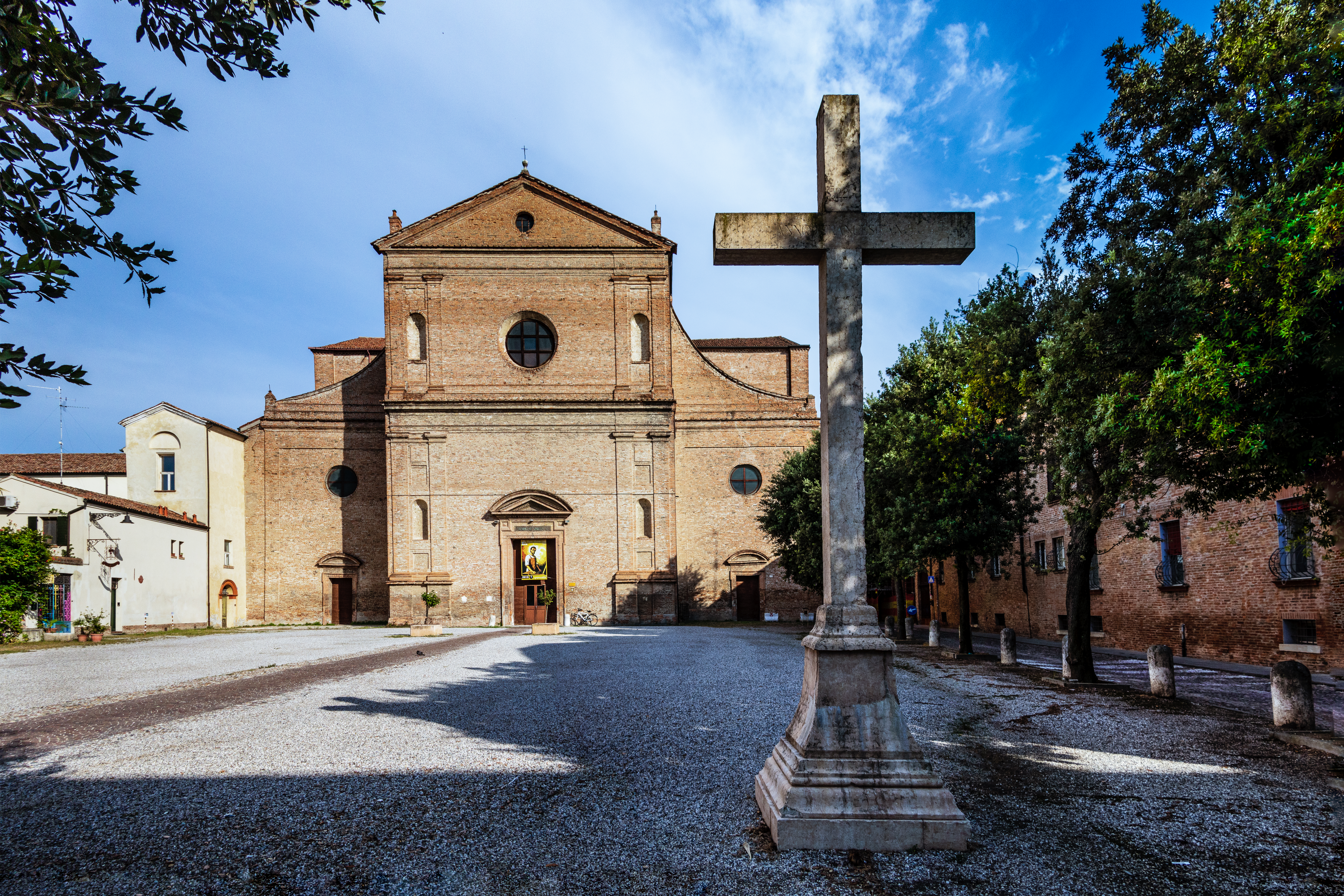
The convent of the Holy Spirit in Ferrara, where Dragišić was ordained a deacon

In Ferrara, Dragišić entered the Observant Franciscan convent of the Holy Spirit as a deacon. He studied at various times in the Franciscan studia of Ferrara, Padua and Pavia, and in the universities of Bologna, Paris and Oxford, where John Foxal was one of his teachers. He did not have a high opinion of the "Parisian articles" of 1277 restricting what could be taught there.

On 18 March 1469, Dragišić was ordained a priest in the cathedral of Bologna. By the end of the year, he had joined the household of Cardinal Bessarion in Rome. In Rome, he seems to have joined the Conventual Franciscans, a better fit for a scholar. In 1472, following Bessarion's death, Dragišić took up the position of rector of the University of Urbino and tutor of Guidobaldo da Montefeltro, the young heir to the Duchy of Urbino, whom he taught to read and write. He became a citizen of Urbino and was adopted into the noble Felici family. He sometimes appears with the surname de Feliciis. His time in Urbino lasted until 1482.

In 1482, according to Serafino Razzi's Storia di Raugia, Dragišić (whom he calls Jure Bošnjak) stopped in Dubrovnik while returning from a pilgrimage to the Holy Land. There, according to his own account, he fell ill and gave a relic he had acquired of the left hand (or arm) of John the Baptist to two citizens for safekeeping. Back in Italy, he sold it to the Florentine merchants' guild, the Arte dei Mercatanti, who were anxious to acquire a relic to rival the Baptist's supposed right arm, given to the Republic of Siena by Pope Pius II in 1464. The Republic of Dubrovnik, however, refused to hand it over. The dispute dragged on for years, with Dubrovnik claiming that Dragišić had given them the relic while in perfect health. In 1490, the Florentines enlisted Pope Innocent VIII to write two letters on their behalf. They themselves wrote to the Ottoman sultan Bayezid II in 1491. Aelius Lampridius Cervinus wrote an epigram, Ad Florentiam postulantem laevam S. Ioannis, in defence of Dubrovnik's position. The relic is still in Dubrovnik, where it is kept in a reliquary from 1624 inside an 18th-century casket.

=== Florence ===
In 1483 or 1485, Dragišić moved to Florence, where he was adopted by the Salviati family and received a chair in theology at the Studio Fiorentino. At the Studio, he befriended Marsilio Ficino. On 25 May 1488, the chapter general of the Franciscan order appointed him rector of Santa Croce for a term of three years and inquisitor of Florence for two.

On 23 June 1489, a public debate between the Franciscans and Dominicans was held in Santa Reparata on the question of whether or not the sin of Adam was the greatest of sins. Dragišić took part on the Franciscan side, arguing that it was not the greatest sin. On 30 June, Lorenzo de' Medici invited Dragišić and the Hungarian philosopher Nicolaus de Mirabilibus to a banquet in the Palazzo Vecchio to continue the debate. Dragišić published an account of this second encounter. Lorenzo hired him to tutor his son Piero in philosophy. He also asked him to judge the orthodoxy of the Apologia of Giovanni Pico della Mirandola, which was dedicated to Lorenzo and defended thirteen theses condemned by a papal commission. Dragišić found in favour of Pico.

In 1490, Dragišić was named Franciscan minister provincial of Tuscany. In 1492, he conspired to replace Francesco Sansone as minister general of the order. The idea is first seen in a letter of Giovanni da Prato to Piero de' Medici early in the year. On 5 July, Dragišić turned down a two-year chair in theology at the University of Pisa and travelled to Rome. He offered Pope Alexander VI 4,000 ducats—500 from himself and the remainder supplied by the Medici and Salviati families—to make him minister general. The plan failed and Sansone deprived him of all his offices in the order, appointing Pietro da Figino as minister provincial. In 1493, riots broke out around Santa Croce in response to Piero's interference Franciscan affairs. After the fall of Piero de' Medici in 1494, Dragišić fell victim to the repression of Medici supporters and was imprisoned for eleven days. He was forced into exile in Dubrovnik until 1500.

=== From exile to archbishop ===
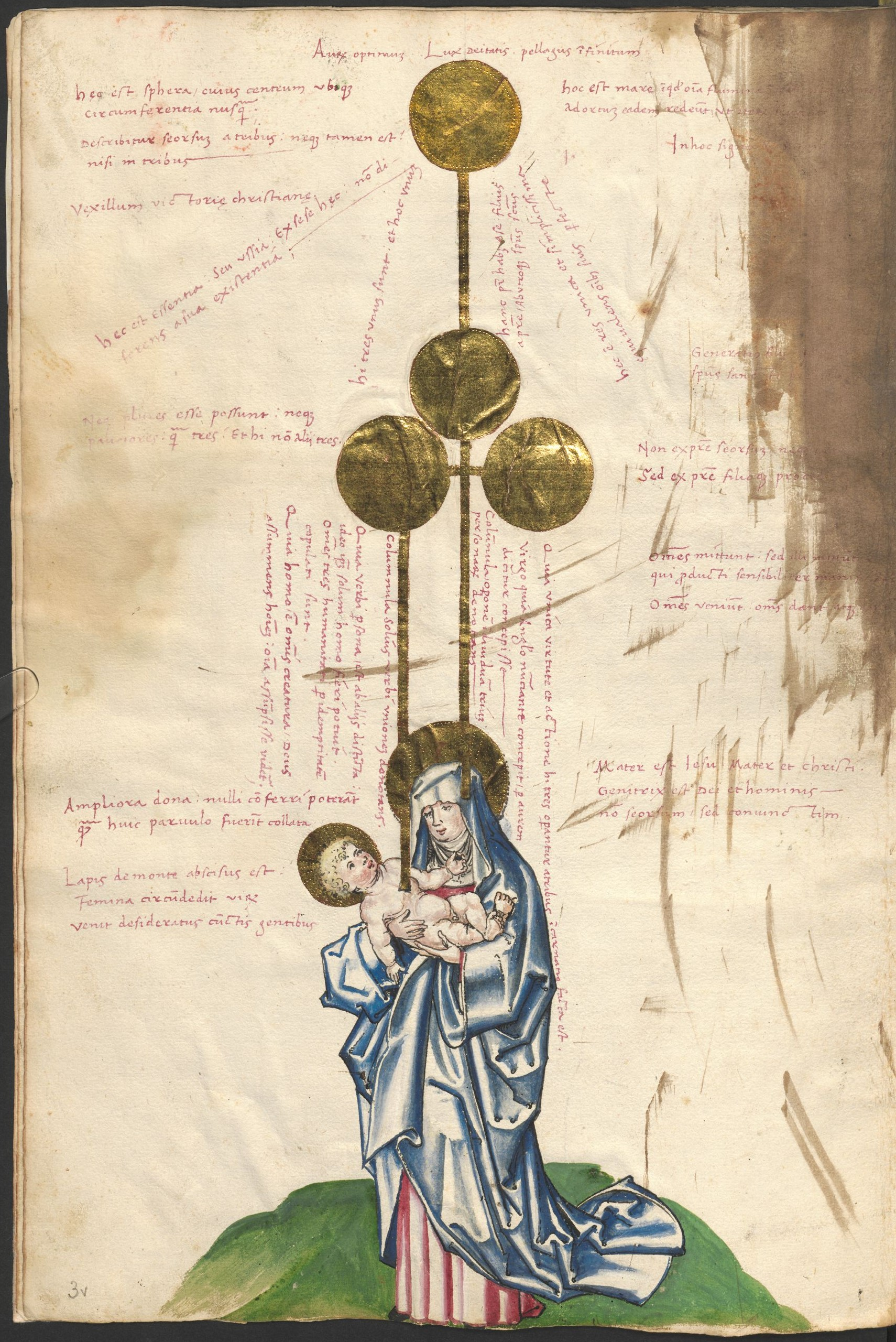
Coat of arms of Maximilian I (left) and Madonna and child illustration (right) from the first dedication copy of Dragišić's Vexillum christianae victoriae

In Dubrovnik, Dragišić worked as a lecturer and as the vicar of the Archbishop Giovanni Sacco. In 1500, he attended the general chapter in Terni where Sansone's successor was elected. In a sign of his return to favour and prestige in Italy, he preached a sermon in the Apostolic Palace in Rome on 1 January 1501 in the presence of the pope. In 1503–1504, he was the custos of the Sacro Convento in Assisi. In 1504, he was elected rector of Santi Apostoli in Rome. In 1505, he was named commissar general of the Franciscan province of Austria. In 1506, he became a professor of theology at the University of Rome.

On 21 May 1507, Pope Julius II appointed Dragišić bishop of Cagli. From the summer of 1507 until January 1509, Dragišić was part of a diplomatic mission headed by Cardinal Bernardino López de Carvajal to the court of Maximilian I, Holy Roman Emperor, on behalf of the papacy. In 1509, Maximilian ordered the destruction of all copies of the Talmud in his domains. This order was opposed by Johannes Reuchlin and Dragišić came to Reuchlin's defence. In December 1512, he was promoted to the prestigious but titular archbishopric of Nazareth, the actual seat of which was in Barletta because Nazareth itself was in partibus infidelium. He continued to be bishop of Cagli and reside in Rome.

From 1512 to 1517, Dragišić attended the Fifth Council of the Lateran, where he was "among the twenty-four prelates elected by their fellow prelates to sit on the conciliar deputations." With the election of Giovanni de' Medici as Pope Leo X in 1513, he hoped to obtain a cardinal's hat, but never did. Leo did appoint him to the commission that drafted the bull Apostolici Regiminis (19 December 1513). In July 1516, Leo named him to a commission to investigate Reuchlin's Augenspiegel. He was the first member of the commission to vote in favour of Reuchlin. In 1517–1518, through his contact with the brothers Guillaume and Denis Briçonnet, he was connected to the reform-minded circles centred on the Milanese Oratorio dell'Eterna Sapienza and the Cenacle of Meaux. He died in 1520, either in Barletta or in Rome.

== Works ==
Dragišić wrote in Latin. Many of his writings are unpublished and only available in manuscript. It has been debated whether Dragišić, as a thinker, was more of a medieval scholastic or a Renaissance humanist. In fact, he had a foot in both worlds and his writings reveal a combination of new and old ways of thinking. Theologically he was a Scotist and philosophically a Platonist. The authors he cites most frequently in his writing are John Duns Scotus, Thomas Aquinas, Henry of Ghent, Francis of Meyronnes, Godfrey of Fontaines and Landolfo Caracciolo.

=== Roman period, 1469–1471 ===
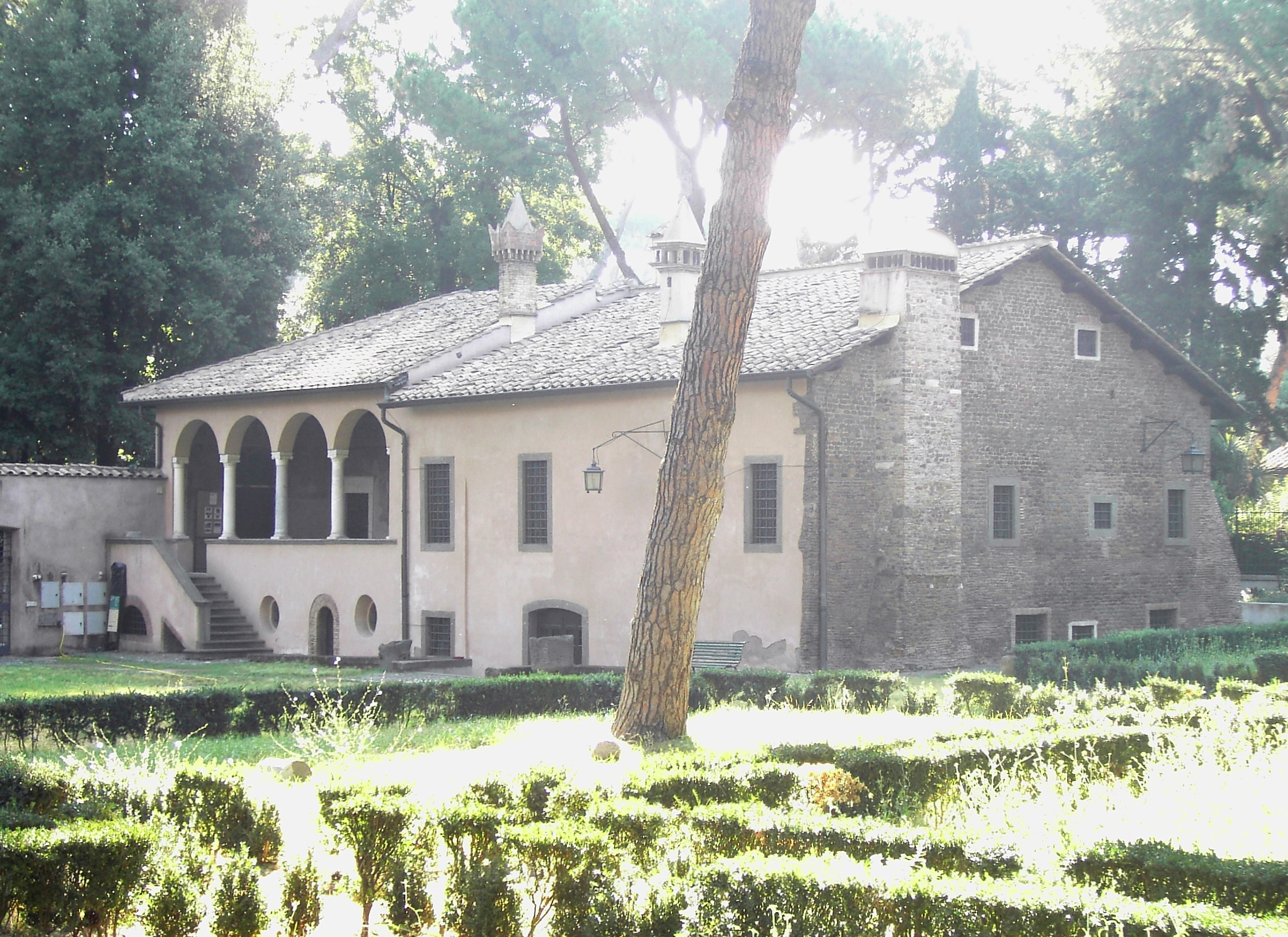
Bessarion's house, where the dialogue De arcanis Dei was originally set

Dragišić wrote three works during his time with Bessarion, two of them now lost. In 1469–1471, during the dispute between Bessarion and George of Trebizond, he wrote a treatise in defence of Bessarion, Defensorium Bessarionis (or Defensio Bessarionis). He lamented the fact that more capable men, like Giovanni Gatto and Fernando de Córdoba, had not risen to the cardinal's defence. The work pleased Bessarion, who gave him the nickname Benignus, meaning 'kind' or 'benevolent'. The only copy of the Defensorium, made by Domizio Calderini, was lost by Dragišić during a trip to England. Although lost, there is evidence that it was used by Calderini and Niccolò Perotti in their response to George of Trebizond written in early 1470.

A short treatise on logic, In logicam introductorium, was also written in this period. It is known only from a reference to it in Dragišić's next work. In 1471, he wrote a dialogue on future contingents, De libertate et immutabilitate Dei (or De arcanis Dei), preserved in the manuscripts Vat. lat. 1056 and Vat. lat. 9402. The work has been edited and published, although erroneously ascribed to Bessarion. In the dialogue, a group gathers in Rome under the leadership of Bessarion to discuss the question of future contingents. The interlocutors are Bessarion; Cardinal Francesco della Rovere, the future Pope Sixtus IV; John Foxal, Dragišić's old professor at Oxford; Giovanni Gatto and Fernando de Córdoba. Chris Schabel describes the dialogue as "humanist in style and structure but scholastic in content". In the original version, Bessarion led the discussion. In the illuminated dedication copy, however, because of the death of Bessarion and the election of Della Rovere to the papacy, their roles are swapped so that the future Sixtus IV appears to lead the discussion, which is moved from Bessarion's house to the palace of the Della Rovere. The dialogue is certainly "imaginary" and not a record of an actual event, although "it is reasonable to suppose that [Dragišić] maintained a certain verisimilitude."

=== Urbinate period, 1472–1482 ===
Dragišić wrote two works during his time at the ducal court in Renaissance Urbino. De communicatione divinae naturae, written during the jubilee of 1475, is preserved in the manuscript Vat. Urb. lat. 565. It is a dialogue dedicated to Duke Federico da Montefeltro in which the duke discusses the nature of the Trinity with Pope Sixtus.

Written between 1474 and 1492, Fridericus, sive de animae regni principe (that is, Fridericus, On the Prince of the Kingdom of the Soul) is a dialogue between Duke Federico (Fridericus) and his brother Ottaviano (Octavianus) concerning will, reason and soul. Dedicated to Guidobaldo, it is preserved in the manuscript Vat. Urb. lat. 995. In the dialogue, Dragišić through the voice of Federico argues for the supremacy of the will over reason in controlling the soul. It is the will and its essential quality of freedom (libertas) that separates humanity from other animals. As Fridericus puts it:

Since every living being understands, and understanding, in turn, is the genus of reason and sense-perception; therefore, the intellect falls under the same genus as the sense; since all these are defined as "apprehensive powers" and they are all natural principles. . . but only the will is by itself free, reason is no more than vision; and thus man, while acting through his intellect, just like acting through his sense, is acting according to nature. Only through his will, as a free agent, man chiefly separates himself from beasts.

Fridericus's concern for the dignity of man and its references to Hermes Trismegistus mark it off as "cutting-edge Renaissance thought".

=== Florentine period, 1486–1494 ===
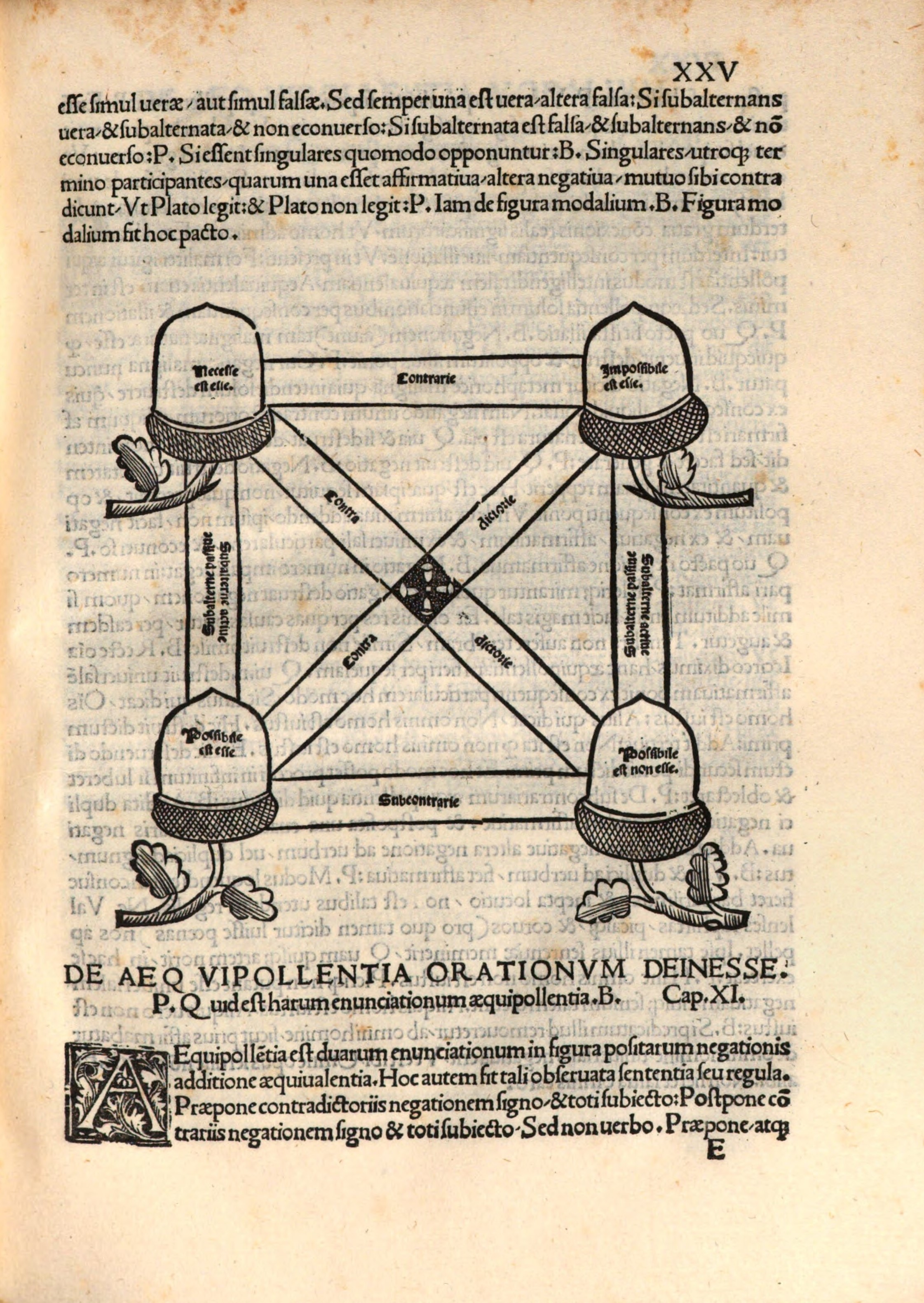
A page from the Artis dialecticae praecepta vetera et nova of 1520

Dragišić wrote four works in Florence. His first printed work was a manual of logic entitled Dialectica nova secundum mentem Doctoris Subtilis et beati Thomae Aquinatis aliorumque realistarum. Dedicated to Giovanni de' Medici (the future Pope Leo X) and his brother Piero (future lord of Florence), it was published at Florence on 18 March 1489 under the name Salviati. It was reprinted at Rome in 1520 under the title Artis dialecticae praecepta vetera et nova. Dragišić was a realist with Platonizing tendencies who sought to demonstrate "concord" between Thomism and Scotism and also between Platonism and Aristotelianism. In this concordism, he was similar to contemporary Florentines like Ficino and Pico.

Both Dragišić and Nicolaus de Mirabilibus published accounts of their 1489 symposium that same year. Dragišić's Septem et septuaginta in opuscolo Magistri Nicolai de Mirabilibus reperta mirabilia ('Seventy-seven Wonders Found in the Work of Master Nicolaus de Mirabilibus') is a polemical account playing on his interlocutor's name to ridicule his arguments as "wonders". The issue they debated was the origin of evil, with Dragišić arguing that evil goes back to God, who is in control of all things, while Nicolaus argued that Adam bore responsibility for introducing sin into the world. In Septem et septuaginta, Dragišić strongly critiques Nicolaus's logic. His arguments found favour with Pico, Ficino and Lorenzo de' Medici, but Nicolaus was defended by the logician Mengo Bianchelli. Ficino had good things to say about both debaters. He wrote a letter of recommendation for Nicolaus and wrote that "brave George, who once pierced a dragon, will easily put to flight all the wolves" who criticized Ficino for writing about astrology and magic.

Also at Florence, Dragišić wrote Opus septem quaestionum, a commentary on Lorenzo de' Medici's sonnet Lo spirito talora a sè redutto. It is preserved in two manuscripts, Biblioteca Riccardiana 317 and Biblioteca Laurenziana Pluteo 83.18. Dragišić also dedicated to Lorenzo his De natura angelica, an unpublished dialogue on angelology. In 1513, he sent a copy of Opus septem quaestionum to the newly elected Pope Leo X, Lorenzo's son.

=== Period of exile, 1494–1500 ===
During his exile in Dubrovnik, Dragišić wrote three works. His Propheticae solutiones is a defence of the trustworthiness of Girolamo Savonarola's prophecies, printed at Florence by Lorenzo Morgiani in 1497. He claims to have learned Savonarola's interpretation of the Book of Revelation while in England and that he was drawn to Florence by its prophetic role. He strongly condemns astrology, especially judicial astrology. His defence of Savonarola is probably his most famous work. Another Florentine philosopher, Giovanni Nesi, originally dedicated his defence of Savonarola, Oraculum de novo saeculo, to Dragišić, but when Morgiani published it in 1497 the dedication was changed.

Opening page of Dragišić's Opus de natura caelestium spirituum quos angelos voca

A second treatise entitled De natura angelica (also known as Opus de natura caelestium spirituum quos angelos voca, English On the Nature of Angels) was printed at Florence by Bartolomeo de' Libri in August 1499. It was based on public questioning he underwent from the learned men of Dubrovnik in May–July and was dedicated to the senate of Dubrovnik. Ante Kadić considers it "[h]is most interesting work." There is a possible portrait of Dragišić in the inhabited initial at the start of the codex.

Oratio funebris pro Iunio Georgio is a funeral oration for the senator Junije Đurđević, whose nephew Sigismund was a student of Dragišić. It was delivered on 17 February 1499 and has been printed.

In 1500, Dragišić and Cardinal Carvajal broke the seals on a document purporting to be the revelations received by Amadeus of Portugal in states of ecstasy. The so-called Apocalypsis nova was copied many times but has never been published. Dragišić describes reading the text in letters sent from Rome to his friend Ubertino Risaliti in Florence. The authenticity of the surviving Apocalypsis has long been questioned and it may be that Dragišić made revisions to it before introducing it to the public. It has even been claimed that the entire work is a forgery by Dragišić. Of Dragišić and the Apocalypsis, Cesare Vasoli writes, "He is in particular the man of the Church who played the most decisive role in the elaboration of one of the most famous prophecies of the sixteenth century."

=== German period, 1507–1509 ===
During his legation of 1507–1509 to Germany, Dragišić edited for publication the Homelia doctissima of Cardinal Carvajal, adding a dedicatory letter to Maximilian I. During this period he also wrote Vexillum christianae victoriae, a treatise divided into 63 "contemplations" on divine simplicity and related Trinitarian topics, still trying to demonstrate concord between Scotism and Platonism. Originally dedicated to Maximilian, who received a copy (now MS Palat. 4797 in the Austrian National Library), a new copy was dedicated to King Francis I of France in 1517 (now MS Lat. 3620 in the National Library of France). There are two other undedicated manuscripts.

Also from Dragišić's German period is a treatise on the assumption of Mary, the Libellus de Virginis Matris assumptione (originally Contemplationes commendationum Virginis gloriosae), preserved in at least four manuscripts, the earliest copy being dedicated to Margaret of Habsburg. It takes as its starting point the apocryphal De transitu Mariae.

Two of Dragišić's letters written from Germany also survive. Addressed to the Florentine gonfaloniere Pier Soderini, they divulge diplomatic secrets, demonstrating Dragišić's ongoing allegiance to the Florentine Republic.

=== Later years ===
Madonna and child illustration (left) and opening page (right) from the dedication copy of the Vexillum christianae victoriae made for the French king in 1517

Dragišić continued to write in his final years. He wrote a separate Marian treatise, De excellentiis et dignitatibus Virginis Matris theoremata, dedicated to Cardinal Guillaume Briçonnet (father of Guillaume and Denis) and preserved in a single manuscript. In 1513, he submitted to Leo X and the Fifth Lateran Council an astronomical treatise on calendar reform, Correctio erroris qui ex equinoctio vernali in kalendario procedere solet, to which he later added a prefatory epistle addressed to Agostino Chigi (both now preserved in manuscript Vat. lat. 8226). Rejecting the notion of moving Easter or declaring the equinox to fall other than when it does, he proposes to remove the extra ten days that had crept into the Julian calendar, a solution close to the actual Gregorian calendar reform of 1582. In adding the preface to Chigi, the wealthiest man in Rome, Dragišić was probably seeking a subsidy for the work.

Following the murder of the hated Cardinal Francesco Alidosi by Duke Francesco Maria I della Rovere on 22 May 1511, Dragišić wrote his Apologeticon seu Defensorium, a defence of the duke that he sent to the pope and the College of Cardinals. It is preserved in a single manuscript. It offers the daring defence that the duke was moved by a divine impulse and that the cardinal's death was the fulfillment of the prophecies Cyril, Bridget and Amadeus of Portugal. In the end, the duke was acquitted.

In January 1515, Dragišić wrote a dialogue entitled An Iudaeorum libri quod Thalmud appellant sint potius supprimendi quam tenendi et conservandi ("Whether the Jewish Books, Which They Call the Talmud, Should be Suppressed or Kept and Preserved"). It was published at Cologne in September 1517 as the main piece in the pamphlet Defensio praestantissimi viri Ioannis Reuchlin, edited by Count Hermann von Neuenahr and with a dedication to the Emperor Maximilian. On 22 September 1517, Johannes Caesarius sent two copies to Desiderius Erasmus. It was reprinted at Rome in January 1518. That year Dragišić also defended Reuchlin in a preface to Pietro Galatino's kabbalistic Opus de archanis Catholicae veritatis, printed at Ortona. In the dialogue An Iudaeorum, Dragišić poses challenged to Reuchlin, often based on the actual accusations of Jacob van Hoogstraaten. Reuchlin ably defends the Talmud's usefulness to Christians, argues that Jews are not heretics and rejects the destruction of the Talmud. According to Ante Kadić, Dragišić's defence of Reuchlin is his most famous work.

=== Lost and questionable works ===
Besides his aforementioned Defensorium Bessarionis and In logicam introductorium, three other lost works by Dragišić are known: Commentaria in IV libros Sententiarum, a commentary on the Sentences of Peter Lombard, which was ready for printing in 1512, according to his student, Antonio Sassolino; Tractatus de rebus moralibus atque ad civilem regimen, which Dragišić refers to in De natura angelica and which was likewise dedicated to the senate of Dubrovnik; and Liber de raptis, a work mentioned by Giovanni Giacinto Sbaraglia and which claimed that the devil who tempted Jesus was the same one who had tempted Adam. In addition, he wrote many sermons, but none has survived.

Vasoli doubts that the Vatican manuscript Ottob. lat. 914 can be connected with Dragišić, as Paul Oskar Kristeller supposed.

== Bibliography ==
- Babić, Mile (2020). "Juraj Dragišić: Defender of Refugees and Exiles". Forum Bosnae (91–92): 336–344.
- Banić-Pajnić, Erna (2004). "Croatian Philosophers II: Juraj Dragišić – Georgius Benignus de Salviatis (ca. 1445–1520)". Prolegomena. 3 (2): 179–197.
- Brown, S. F. (1997). "The Treatise: De Arcanis Dei". In Etzkorn, Girard J. (ed.). De Arcanis Dei. Miscellanea Francescana. pp. 16–64.
- Cattaneo, Gianmario (2018). "Salviati, Giorgio Benigno". In Marco Sgarbi (ed.). Encyclopedia of Renaissance Philosophy. Springer. doi:10.1007/978-3-319-02848-4_752-1.
- Cattaneo, Gianmario (2020). "Defensio Bessarionis: Giorgio Benigno Salviati and the Concept of Authorship in Cardinal Bessarion's Circle From the book Defining Authorship, Debating Authenticity". In Roberta Berardi; Martina Filosa; Davide Massimo (eds.). Defining Authorship, Debating Authenticity: Problems of Authority from Classical Antiquity to the Renaissance. De Gruyter. pp. 175–188.
- Deutscher, T. B. (1985). "Giorgio Benigno Salviati". In P. G. Bietenholz; T. B. Deutscher (eds.). Contemporaries of Erasmus: A Biographical Register of the Renaissance and Reformation. Vol. 1. University of Toronto Press. p. 123.
- Edelheit, Amos (2008). "Human Will, Human Dignity, and Freedom: A Study of Giorgio Benigno Salviati's Early Discussion of the Will, Urbino 1474–1482" (PDF). Vivarium. 46 (1): 82–114.
- Edelheit, Amos (2014). Scholastic Florence: Moral Psychology in the Quattrocento. Brill.
- Etzkorn, Girard J., ed. (1997). De Arcanis Dei. Miscellanea Francescana.
- Ernst, Germana; Zambelli, Paola (1992). "Dragišić, Juraj". Dizionario Biografico degli Italiani (in Italian). Vol. 41: Donaggio–Dugnani. Rome: Istituto dell'Enciclopedia Italiana. ISBN 978-88-12-00032-6.
- Ferrigno, Amélie (2020). Al Magnifico Agostino Chigi: Le mécène et l'imprimerie dans la Rome du début du XVI^{e} siècle. Presses universitaires de Provence.
- Hatfield, Rab (1995). "Botticelli's Mystic Nativity, Savonarola and the Millennium". Journal of the Warburg and Courtauld Institutes. 58: 88–114 (at 105–106). JSTOR 751506.
- Janeković-Römer, Zdenka (2004). "The Orations of Philip Diversi in Honour of the Hungarian Kings Sigismund of Luxemburg and Albert of Hapsburg: Reality and Rhetoric in Humanism". Dubrovnik Annals. 8: 43–79.
- Kadić, Ante (1959). "Croatian Renaissance". Studies in the Renaissance (6): 28–35. doi:10.2307/2857180.
- Kraye, Jill (1996). "Lorenzo and the Philosophers". In Michael Mallett; Nicholas Mann (eds.). Lorenzo the Magnificent: Culture and Politics. University of London Press. pp. 151–166.
- Lupić, Ivan (2021). "Arthur Evans and the Illyrian Parnassus". Dubrovnik Annals. 25: 149–188.
- Minnich, Nelson H. (2016). "The Legitimacy of the Fifth Lateran Council (1512–17)". The Decrees of the Fifth Lateran Council (1512–17): Their Legitimacy, Origins, Contents, and Implementation. Routledge. pp. 167–194. Originally published in Annuarium Historiae Conciliorum 40 (2008).
- Monfasani, John (1992). Fernando of Cordova: A Biographical and Intellectual Profile. American Philosophical Society.
- Monfasani, John (1993). "Aristotelians, Platonists, and the Missing Ockhamists: Philosophical Liberty in Pre-Reformation Italy". Renaissance Quarterly. 46 (2): 247–276. doi:10.2307/3039061.
- Monfasani, John (2021). "Cardinal Bessarion and the Latins". In Sergei Mariev (ed.). Bessarion's Treasure: Editing, Translating and Interpreting Bessarion's Literary Heritage. De Gruyter. pp. 5–21.
- O'Callaghan, Daniel (2013). The Preservation of Jewish Religious Books in Sixteenth-Century Germany: Johannes Reuchlin's Augenspiegel. Brill.
- Pandžić, Bazilije (1970). "Vida y obra de Jorge Dragišić, un humanista, filósofo y teólogo croata en el Renacimiento italiano". Studia croatica. 11 (38–39). Translated by Branko Kadić: 114–131.
- Pandžić, Bazilije (2013). "The Life and Work of Juraj Dragišić". Monumenta Srebrenica. 2 (2): 99–128.
- Price, David (2010). Johannes Reuchlin and the Campaign to Destroy Jewish Books. Oxford University Press.
- Rowland, Ingrid D. (1984). "Some Panegyrics to Agostino Chigi". Journal of the Warburg and Courtauld Institutes. 47: 194–199. JSTOR 751447.
- Scepanovic, Vera (2019). La santificazione della costa dalmata nel tardo Medioevo. Analisi delle fonti testuali e materiali (PhD dissertation). University of Fribourg.
- Schabel, Chris (2003). "Divine Foreknowledge and Human Freedom: Auriol, Pomponazzi, and Luther on 'Scholastic Subtleties'". In R. L. Friedman; L. O. Nielsen (eds.). The Medieval Heritage in Early Modern Metaphysics and Modal Theory, 1400–1700. Springer. pp. 165–189. doi:10.1007/978-94-017-0179-2_9.
- Stevenson, Jane (2021). The Light of Italy: The Life and Times of Federico da Montefeltro, Duke of Urbino. Bloomsbury Publishing.
- Vasoli, Cesare (1969). "Notizie su Giorgio Benigno Salviati (Juraj Dragisic)". In Giosuè Musca (ed.). Studi storici in onore di Gabriele Pepe. Bari. pp. 429–498. Reprinted in Profezia e ragione: Studi sulla cultura del Cinquecento e del Seicento (Naples, 1974), pp. 15–127.
- Vasoli, Cesare (1992). "Giorgio Benigno Salviati (Dragišić)". In Marjorie Reeves (ed.). Prophetic Rome in the High Renaissance Period. Clarendon Press. pp. 121–156.
- Weinstein, Donald (1970). Savonarola and Florence: Prophecy and Patriotism in the Renaissance. Princeton University Press.
- Zoitou, Sofia (2021). Staging Holiness: The Case of Hospitaller Rhodes (ca. 1309–1522). Brill.
