= Graham Howe =

American art historian

Graham Howe (born 1950) is an Australian curator, writer, photo-historian and artist. He is founder and CEO of Curatorial, Inc., a comprehensive fine art services organisation that also encompasses nonprofit traveling museum exhibitions as well as art collection management and advisory services. Curatorial Inc. manages the E.O. Hoppé Estate Collection and the Paul Outerbridge II Collection among others. Born in Sydney, Australia, Howe now resides in Los Angeles and London.

== Education ==
Graham Howe received a Diploma of Art & Design in Photography, Film and Art History, (Hons) in 1971 from Prahran College of Advanced Education, Melbourne, Australia. He continued his tertiary studies in 1976, gaining his Master of Arts degree at the University of California, Los Angeles, California (UCLA) in Painting Sculpture, and Graphic Arts (Majoring in Photography) in 1978 where he studied with Robert Heinecken, achieving his Master of Fine Arts degree in 1979.

== Career ==
In 1972, Howe became one of the first employees of The Photographers' Gallery, London, a research assistant at the Royal Photographic Society, London, and, in 1973, the founding Director of the Australian Centre for Photography, Sydney, where in 1974 he organised an exhibition and publication of contemporary practitioners New photography Australia : a selective survey, and published Aspects of Australian Photography.

In 1976, he became the curator for Graham Nash and from 1977 was Los Angeles Correspondent for the Australian journal Light Vision, to which he contributed a photo-essay Sneaker in the Sky for the January 1978 edition. From 1984 to 1985 he was a visiting curator at the Museum of Contemporary Art, Los Angeles.

In 1988, Howe incorporated Curatorial Assistance, Inc., a company specialising in fine art and museum services, and in 2000 he founded Curatorial Assistance Traveling Exhibitions, a 501(c)3 nonprofit organisation that originates and travels exhibitions of art to museums worldwide. In 2025, Howe co-founded Curatorial Gallery, based in South Kensington, London.

== Awards ==
- National Endowment for the Arts Photography Fellowship
- Ford Foundation grant

== Collections ==
- Harvard University Art Museums
- Metropolitan Museum of Art, New York
- Los Angeles County Museum of Art
- Victoria & Albert Museum, London

== Artist exhibitions ==
- Art of Illusion: Photography and Perceptual Play, Nelson-Atkins Museum of Art, Kansas City, Missouri, 2021
- California Cool: Art in Los Angeles 1960s–70s, National Gallery of Australia, Canberra, 2018-19
- Forsaken Utopias: Photographs from the OCMA Permanent Collection, Orange County Museum of Art, Santa Ana, California, 2018
- Graham Howe: Colour Theory, Rooftop Gallery, Bangkok, 2013
- Graham Howe: Color Theory, Sol Mednick Gallery, University of the Arts, Philadelphia, 2012
- Street Sight, Armory Center for the Arts, Pasadena. Curated by Tim Wride, 2011.
- Time Signatures, Grunwald Study Center for the Graphic Arts, Hammer Museum, 2011
- And Howe! Photographs By Graham Howe, 1968–2008, (mid-career survey)California Museum of Photography, Riverside. Curated by Colin Westerbeck, 2009.
- Graham Howe, Gallery Min, Tokyo, Japan, 1984, publication with essay by Colin Westerbeck
- Arranged Image Photography, a traveling exhibition organized by the Boise Gallery of Art, 1983–1984
- Graham Howe, BC Space, Laguna Beach, California, 1981
- Graham Howe, The Photographers’ Gallery, Melbourne, Australia, 1980
- Invented Images, a traveling exhibition organized by the University Art Museum, Santa Barbara, 1980
- Attitudes: Photography in the 1970s, The Santa Barbara Museum of Art, 1979
- The Photograph as Artifice, a traveling exhibition organized by The Art Galleries, California State University, 1978

== Publications ==
Howe's main area of expertise is early Modern twentieth century photography. He has published extensively on the work of American photographer, Paul Outerbridge (1896-1958) and British photographer, E.O. Hoppé (1878-1972).

- Howe, G. (1974). New Photography Australia: A Selective Survey. Sydney: The Australian Centre for Photography. p. 103. ISBN 978-0-909339-00-5.
- Howe, G. (1974). Aspects of Australian Photography. Sydney: The Australian Centre for Photography. p. 71. ISBN 978-0-909339-02-9.
- Howe, G. (essay) (1976). Paul Outerbridge Jr. Los Angeles Center for Photographic Studies.
- Howe, G.; Nagatani, P.; Rankin, S. (1978). Two Views of Manzanar: Ansel Adams and Toyo Miyatake. Los Angeles: Wight Gallery, UCLA. ASIN B001BST592.
- Howe, G.; Nash, G.; Nash, S. (1978). The Graham Nash Collection. Los Angeles: Nash Press. ASIN B0012SCE6M.
- Hawkins, G.; Howe, G.; Markham, J. (1980). Paul Outerbridge Jr. Photographs. New York: Rizzoli. p. 159. ISBN 978-0-8478-0281-4.
- Dines, E.; Howe, G. (1981). Paul Outerbridge Jr.: A Singular Aesthetic. Los Angeles: Arabesque Books. ISBN 0-940872-02-1.
- Howe, G. (1984). 10 Photographers: Olympic Images. Los Angeles Center for Photographic Studies. p. 144. ISBN 978-0-914357-06-3.
- Howe, G. (1988). Graham Howe Exhibition (catalogue). Gallery Min, Osaka, Japan. Osaka Contemporary Art Center.
- Howe, G.; Schaaf, L. (1990). Tracings of Light: Sir John Herschel and the Camera Lucida. San Francisco: The Friends of Photography. ISBN 978-0-933286-55-9.
- Howe, G. (1991). Eikoh Hosoe: META. Pasadena: Curatorial Assistance. pp. 123 pages. ASIN B0006F1LRU.
- Howe, G. (1996). Nudes: Paul Outerbridge. Milan: Federico Motta Editore. pp. 60 pages. ISBN 978-88-7179-108-1.
- Howe, G. (1999). Camera Over Hollywood—Photographs by John Swope. New York: Distributed Art Publishers. pp. 144 pages. ISBN 978-1-891024-08-5.
- Howe, G. (2008). E.O. Hoppe's Australia. New York: W.W. Norton. pp. 208 pages. ISBN 978-0-393-06611-1.
- Howe, G., with co-curators Ewing, W. and Prodger, P. (2009). Paul Outerbridge: New Color Photographs from Mexico and California, 1948–1955. Portland: Nazraeli Press. ISBN 978-1-59005-261-7.
- Pal, Dr. P., Howe, G. Radhika Sabavala for the Marg Foundation, Mumbai (2010). E.O. Hoppé's Bombay: Photographs from 1929. Pasadena, California: Curatorial Assistance Inc. ISBN 978-8-190832-31-1.
- Pal, Dr. P., Howe, G. Radhika Sabavala for the Marg Foundation, Mumbai (2010). E.O. Hoppé's Santiniketan: Photographs from 1929. Pasadena, California: Curatorial Assistance Inc. ISBN 978-9-380581-04-0.
- Howe, G., with Beth Gates Warren (2017). Edward Weston: Portrait of the Young Man as an Artist. New York: Merrell Publishers. ISBN 978-1-8589-4663-4.
- Bowlt, J Howe, G., Minin, O. Iskusstvo (2018). One Hundred and One Photographs: Emil Otto Hoppé and the Ballets Russes. Pasadena, California: Curatorial Assistance, Inc. ISBN 978-0-982938-81-2.
- Howe, G. Ionescu, A.S., Lundeberg, M., Dragoo, M. (2019). E.O. Hoppé: Photographs of Greater Romania, 1923. Pasadena, California: Curatorial Books. ISBN 978-1-733641-41-8.
- Howe, G. (2025). Epoch: Graham Howe: 1970-1971. Photographs and text by Graham Howe. Pasadena, California: Curatorial Books. ISBN 978-0-9707913-1-3.
