= John Foxal =

Franciscan theologian, philosopher and prelate in Ireland

John Foxal (c. 1415–1474), also spelled Foxholes, Foxhalls, Foxhals or Foxall, was an English Franciscan theologian, philosopher and prelate who served as the archbishop of Armagh and primate of Ireland from 1471 until his death. An Oxford University graduate, he lectured in Germany and Italy before returning to the Isles as a bishop.

== Life ==
Also known as Ioannes Anglicus ('John the Englishman'), Foxal was ordained a subdeacon at the Franciscan Friary in Lichfield on 2 June 1436. He was an Observant who may have later become a Conventual. He was ordained a priest in Lichfield on 23 September 1441 by Bishop William Heyworth. By 1450, he was resident at Oxford and on 14 April 1451 he applied for a baccalaureate. Around 1462 he was lecturing at the University of Erfurt. By 1465 he was a doctor of the theological faculty of the University of Bologna and there became familiar with the visions of Catherine of Bologna. He was there as late as 18 December 1470. On 1 June 1470 or 1471, he defended the Scotist position in a public debate over future contingents alongside Cardinal Bessarion, Cardinal Francesco della Rovere, Giovanni Gatto and Fernando de Córdoba. A fictionalized record of this debate was made by one of his former Oxford students, Juraj Dragišić.

On 16 December 1471, Pope Sixtus IV appointed Foxal to succeed John Bole as archbishop of Armagh. Bole had left the archdiocese bankrupt and Foxal had to borrow 1,100 florins from Italian bankers like the Bardi. Although Foxal received the pallium and was consecrated as a bishop in England after the spring of 1472, he was unable to actually take possession of the archdiocese because of his financial problems. He appointed proctors to govern the see while he stayed in London trying to raise funds. He was dead by 23 November 1474 and his successor, Edmund Connesburgh, was appointed on 5 June 1475.

== Works ==
The following works have been attributed to Foxal:

Start of Flores e libris Posteriorum Analyticorum Aristotelis in the Parisian manuscript

- Commentarium in I Sententiarum Scoti, a commentary on the first book of Duns Scotus' Opus Oxoniense, found in a single manuscript
- Commentarium in Porphyrium Scoti, found in many manuscripts and printed at Venice in 1483 and again in 1492
- A collection of works found only in the manuscript Vat. lat. 9402, which also has a copy of the Commentarium in Porphyrium Scoti:
  - Tractatus de cognitione Dei per creaturas
  - Tractatus de potentia obiectiva et subiectiva
  - Tractatus de triplici genere actionis
  - Tractatus de propositione per se nota
  - Tractatus de productione creaturae
  - Tractatus de duplici principio et quadruplici modo principandi
  - Tractatus de oppositis actis voluntatis
- Opusculum de primis et secundis intentionibus, known only from the writings of Giovanni Giacinto Sbaraglia
- Tractatus de distinctionibus et formalitatibus (or Tractatus de formalitatibus et distinctionibus), a work referred to in the Commentarium in Porphyrium Scoti
- Flores e libris Posteriorum Analyticorum Aristotelis, found in three manuscripts and printed at Venice in 1509
- Expositio super Metaphysicam Antonii Andreae, found in a single incomplete copy
- Tractatus de octo speciebus distinctionis actionum (or Tractatus de octo generibus vel modis actionum), a work referred to in the Commentarium in Porphyrium Scoti
- Expositio Universalium Scoti, printed at Venice in 1508 and 1512
- Expositio super Conflatum Francisci Mayronis, a hypothetical work

== Bibliography ==
- Beresford, David (2009). "Foxhals (Foxhalls, Foxholes), John". Dictionary of Irish Biography. doi:10.3318/dib.003350.v1.
- Etzkorn, Girard J. (1989). "John Foxal, O.F.M.: His Life and Writings". Franciscan Studies. 49: 17–24. doi:10.1353/frc.1989.0006. JSTOR 41968790.
- Millett, Benignus (1999–2000). "John Foxholes, Franciscan, Archbishop of Armagh 1471–74". Seanchas Ardmhacha: Journal of the Armagh Diocesan Historical Society. 18 (1): 22–29. doi:10.2307/29742691. JSTOR 29742691.
- Smith, Garrett R.; Van Croesdijk, Benno (2015). "Newly Identified Treatises by John Foxal". Bulletin de Philosophie Médiévale. 57: 335–381. doi:10.1484/J.BPM.5.110811.
