= Fernando de Córdoba =

Spanish theologian, canonist, curialist and philosopher

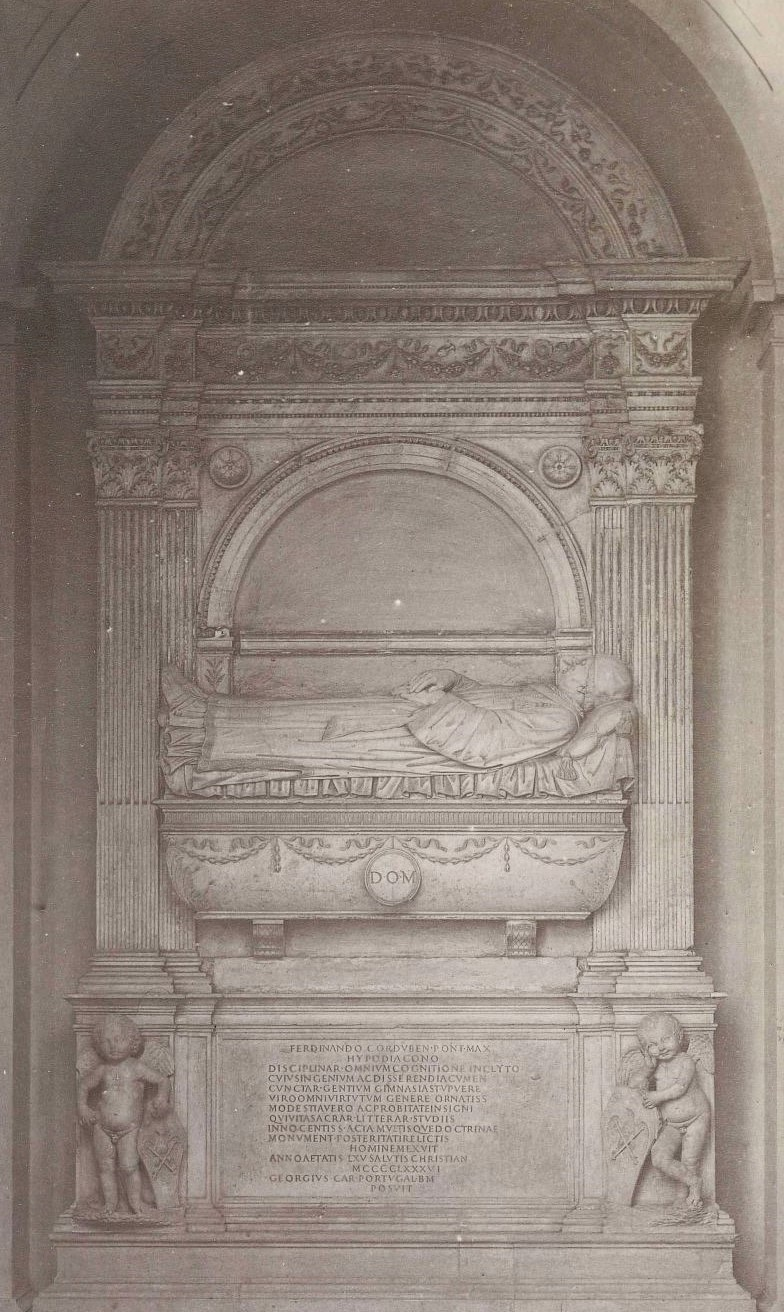
Fernando's monumental tomb

Fernando de Córdoba (1421/2–1486) was a Spanish theologian, canonist, curialist and philosopher. He travelled Europe in 1444–1446, amazing audiences with public disputations and displays of erudition, but fell into obscurity until resurfacing during the Plato–Aristotle controversy in 1466.

== Life ==
=== Early life in Spain ===
Fernando was born in 1421 or 1422 in Medina Azahara or perhaps in Burgos. Sources called him the son of a knight and a knight himself. His family was from Córdoba and he may have begun his education there before moving on to university.

He was educated at the University of Salamanca. Philosophically, he was a Platonist and a realist concerning universals. Theologically, he was a Scotist. Before he left Spain, he had extensively memorized the works of Augustine of Hippo, Averroes, Albert the Great, Thomas Aquinas, Alexander of Hales, Bonaventure and John Duns Scotus. He had Master of Arts and Doctor of Theology degrees, possibly also degrees in medicine and law.

=== First trip to Italy ===
There is conflicting evidence about when Fernando came to Italy. He may have come as early as 1442 to continue his education at the University of Bologna. He claimed in 1445 to have been in Italy the previous two years performing some mission on behalf of King John II of Castile. A Neapolitan cedula of September 1444, however, seems to show that he was only recently arrived from Naples at that time.

The earliest definite evidence for Fernando in Italy comes from a letter of Lorenzo Valla dated at Naples on 25 July 1444. Addressing King Alfonso the Magnanimous, Valla praises Fernando for the mastery of arts, law, medicine and theology that he displayed in three days of debates. He believed that Fernando was only seventeen or eighteen years old and knew Hebrew, Arabic and Aramaic, although his Latin needed improvement and he needed to learn Greek. In response to Valla's commendation, Alfonso granted Fernando a gift of 50 ducats.

Poggio Bracciolini claimed that Fernando rescued Valla from the Inquisition at Naples, although Valla disputed this.

=== Tour of northern Europe ===
By November 1445, Fernando was touring northern Europe, ostensibly on behalf of the king of Castile. According to a letter to the chancellor of Brabant, Fernando wrote to King Charles VII of France in his capacity as a diplomat. Northerners, like the Bourgeois de Paris, had a higher opinion of his Latin than did Valla. He arrived at the court of Charles VII with eight horses and demonstrated his knowledge of chivalry and his skills with the two-handed sword. He claimed knowledge of Greek, skill in painting and music and the ability to construct musical instruments.

Fernando arrived in Paris in December 1445 and asked the rector of the university "for permission to hold a disputation in four days". Before the disputation could take place, he asked to be excused from his commitment so that he could go visit the court of Duke Philip the Good of Burgundy by Christmas. On 9 December, the university arrested him. In many interviews, he claimed to have written commentaries on Ptolemy's Almagest and the Revelation of Saint John and demonstrated such breadth of knowledge that rumours were spread that he was the Antichrist. On 11 December, he answered questions before an assembly of students and teachers in the Collège des Bernardins. Failing to find "grounds to charge him with heresy, fraud, or even magic", he was released, although the professors sent a letter of warning to Philip the Good. Fernando promised to return to fulfill his commitment to a public disputation, but it is unknown if he ever did.

According to Mathieu d'Escouchy, Fernando's visit to the court of the duke of Burgundy in Ghent was highly successful. There are conflicting reports about whether he subsequently visited England, but he himself later claimed to have made the trip. He visited Cologne during Lent in 1446, where he was arrested for heresy and demonic possession.

=== Return to Italy ===
Released, he travelled back to Italy. On 6 June 1446, he held a public disputation in Genoa covering 28 questions on art, theology, philosophy and medicine. He claimed at the time to have visited Padua, Milan and Venice. He left a great impression on Giacomo Bracelli, who admired his knowledge of Arabic astrology, but Antonio Cassarino called him a "little barbarian".

On 21 July 1446, Fernando held a public disputation in Siena. In a lecture the following day, Mariano Sozzini praised him as "a man more divine than human". According to Agostino Dati, Fernando denied that Aristotle believed in the immortality of the soul. Dati adds that the only Sienese scholar who was his equal was Pietro Rossi. He compares Fernando to the ancient Sophists. He left Siena with the intention of returning to Naples. The Signoria of Siena sent a letter of recommendation to King Alfonso, unaware that Alfonso already knew him.

=== Cardinals' service ===
Sometime between July 1446 and September 1447, Fernando entered the service of Cardinal Juan Carvajal. He accompanied the cardinal on a legation to Germany and Hungary in 1447–1448. In September 1447 in Siena, he stayed at the house of a certain Leonardo, who had seen his disputation the previous year. In Vienna, he met the emperor-elect Frederick III. According to Juan de Lucena, he painted his portrait. In October, he enrolled in the University of Vienna and the following month, with the support of the emperor-elect and cardinal, made his standard offer to hold a public disputation. He at first refused the university's terms, but accepted them the following year. The disputation was held on 19–20 September 1448 with Frederick III in attendance. The respondent was Georg Tudel von Giengen.

Fernando returned with Carvajal to the court of Pope Nicholas V at Spoleto in the spring of 1449. In September, he was granted benefices and the privileges of a member of the papal household. By early 1450, he had entered the service of Cardinal Bessarion. References to Fernando are scarce in the following decade. He was certainly with Bessarion in Bologna in 1452 and presumably throughout the cardinal's stay there (1450–1455). He remained within Bessarion's circle until the cardinal's death in November 1472.

Fernando was a professor of theology at the University of Rome in 1460–1461, but it is unclear how long he had been there. He was still in Rome in 1463, having spent the preceding three years procuring benefices in Spain from Pope Pius II. He acquired a benefice in León, a large pension and a canonry in Cuenca Cathedral. Through the intercession of Bessarion, Fernando became a papal subdeacon sometime between late 1466 and early 1469. There were at the time five subdeacons sharing the duties and revenues of the office.

In 1470, Fernando was dragged into the controversy over future contingents that had erupted at the University of Louvain between Petrus de Rivo and Henricus de Zoemeren. It is uncertain if he was asked to intervene by Bessarion.

=== Sixtus IV and death ===
In 1471, Pope Sixtus IV appointed him to a commission to investiage the orthodoxy of Petrus de Rivo. In March 1473, the commission condemned Petrus's opinions but declared that had abjured them. In late 1483 or early 1484, Fernando was appointed by Sixtus IV to a panel charged with judging the orthodoxy of the Ianua Artis of the Lullist Pere Deguí. The panel, dominated by Scotists, found in favour of Deguí. It issued its report to Sixtus' successor, Innocent VIII, only after the election of one of its members, Francisco Vidal de Noya, as bishop of Cefalù in late 1484.

Fernando died in 1486. A large funerary monument was erected in San Giacomo degli Spagnuoli by Cardinal Jorge da Costa. It was later relocated to Santa Maria in Monserrato degli Spagnoli.

== Works ==
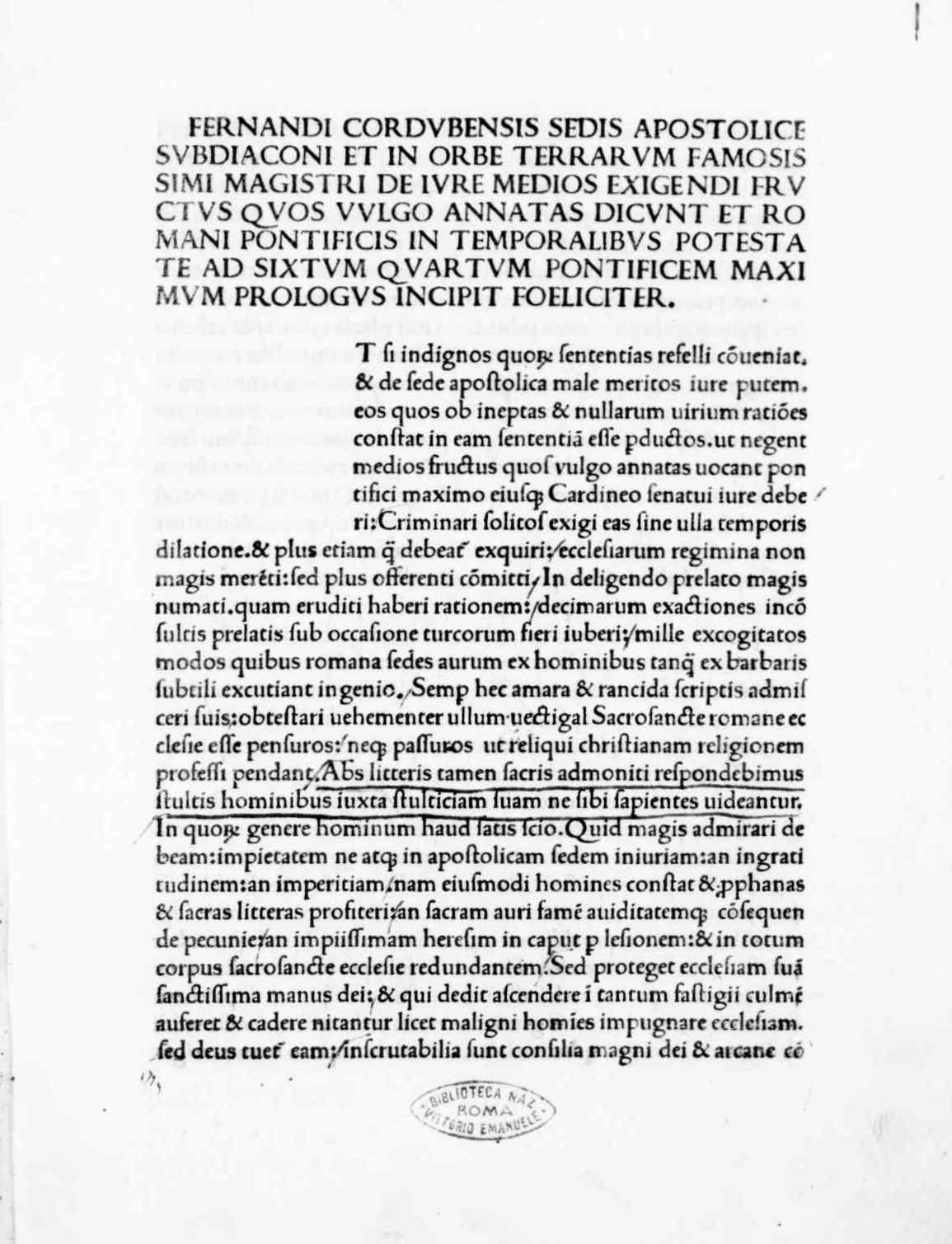
A page from a 1484 printing of Fernando's De iure medios exigendi fructus quo vulgo annatas dicunt

=== Philosophy ===
In 1466, at the start of the Plato–Aristotle controversy, Fernando penned a preliminary defence of Plato, De Laudibus Platonis ex Testimoniis Tum Sacrorum Interpretum, Tum Ethnicorum adversus Quosdam Doctrinam Eius et Vitam Carpere Solitos. Commissioned by and dedicated to Cardinal Bessarion, De Laudibus is directed against George of Trebizond's Comparatio Philosophorum Platonis et Aristotelis. It is a collection of ancient testimonia infavour of Plato. It survives in a single manuscript copy dated 28 January 1467. Already in late 1466, Niccolò Palmieri had written a response at the request of Pope Paul II.

Of his own accord, Fernando wrote a follow-up to De Laudibus, entitled De Duabus Philosophiis et Praestantia Philosophiae Platonis supra Aristotelis, but it does not survive. Bessarion ordered him to put it aside, since he was himself writing a major defence of Plato, In Calumniatorem Platonis. Nevertheless, Fernando finished it in late 1468 or early 1469. The sole copy of De Duabus was owned by Bessarion, but was subsequently lost.

Around the same time as he was finishing De Duabus, between October 1468 and August 1469, Fernando completed his De Artificio Omnis et Investigandi et Inveniendi Natura Scibilis, in which he offers what he regards as the means of learning "everything that is naturally knowable". The work shows signs of having been composed in haste. It was intended to deliver the treatment of the "universal art of discovery" promised by Ramon Llull but never published by him. Fernando argues that there must be "a universal method of investigation underlying the different modes of investigation peculiar to the various arts and sciences because only" such a method "uniting in itself all the diverse perfections of its genus can account for the very existence of the multiplicity" of methods.

Between mid-1470 and mid-1471, during the debate over future contingents, Fernando wrote two works against Petrus de Rivo. The first, which discussed his scriptural arguments, is lost. The second, which seeks to refute Petrus on strictly logical grounds, is known from two manuscripts.

=== Theology ===
At the request of Bessarion, Fernando wrote a lost treatise on the Eucharist. This was probably a defence of Bessarion's position in his own treatise, written between 1463 and 1469 in both Greek and Latin, which had been deemed heretical by George of Trebizond and Niccolò Palmieri.

Another lost work by Fernando, probably written in 1466, is An Licita Sit cum Saracenis Pax. It was dedicated to Pope Paul II and presumably concerned peace negotiations between Hungary and the Ottoman Empire. As the pope was strongly opposed to the negotiations, Fernando probably argued against the validity of such a peace. The only known copy of An Licita was owned by Bessarion and was still in his collection in the 1540s.

After some Fraticelli were found living near Rome in 1466, Fernando was commissioned by Cardinal Guillaume d'Estouteville to refute their heresy. The result was Adversus Hereticos Qui Fraterculi dela Opinione Appellantur, probably completed in 1467 or 1468. Revealing himself to be a hierocrat, Fernando defends the universal authority of the pope over both spiritual and temporal affairs in arguments very similar to those of Agostino Favaroni. He defends the wealth and standard of living of prelates being commensurate with their high status. Despite his acquaintance with Lorenzo Valla, who had demonstrated the inauthenticity of the Donation of Constantine, Fernando treats the donation as fact. Although Adversus Hereticos was in line with the views of Estouteville, it was out of step with those of Bessarion.

In Adversus Hereticos, Fernando refers to an earlier theological tract that cannot be identified with any of his other known works. In the lost tract, he defended the right of the pope to depose any ecclesiastic. The tract was probably directed against conciliarism.

Sometime during the pontificate of Sixtus IV (1471–1481) and after the death of Bessarion (1472), Fernando wrote De Misterio Pallii, et An pro Eo Aliquod Temporale absque Simonie Labe Exigi Possit, a defence of the subdeacons' practice of receiving payment for conferring the pallium, one of their traditional duties. It was dedicated to Francesco Todeschini Piccolomini, the future Pope Pius III. It sought to refute the arguments of Henry of Langenstein, Durand of Saint-Pourçain, John of Rupella and John of Ripa that the subdeacons were engaged in simony, the sale of spiritual offices.

De Consultandi Ratione, which Fernando dedicated to Cardinal Ausiàs Despuig between 12 December 1477 and 3 September 1483, is known from a single presentation copy, whereabouts unknown and possibly lost. It concerned the duty of the cardinals to advise the pope.

Fernando's De Iure Medios Exigendi Fructus Quos Vulgo Annatos Diccunt et Romani Pontificis in Temporalibus Potestate is a treatise in two parts of which only the first part ever appeared in print, at Rome around 1481. Dedicated to Sixtus IV, it defends the payment of annates to the papacy, correctly noting that such payments were older than the pontificate of Boniface IX (contrary to the claims of several other humanists).

=== Science ===
The commentary on Ptolemy which Fernando in Paris in 1445 claimed to have written does not survive, if it ever existed. Around 1470, he did write a treatise on urinology, De Secretis Humane Nature per Urinam Cognoscendis. Although it promised a second section that "for the sheer fun of it" (delectationis gratia) answered questions like whether there was greater pleasure in sexual intercourse, in eating or in excretion (in quo est maior delectation, an in coeundo vel comedendo vel egerendo), only the first part is found in the only extant manuscript. This copy was owned by Pierleone Leoni, physician to Lorenzo de' Medici.

In 1478, Fernando published an edition of Albert the Great's De Animalibus dedicated to Sixtus IV. He defended Albert's Latinity, but added a table of corrected transliterations of various Greek and Arabic words that Albert had misspelled. He argued that Albert's Latin set the standard for philosophical writing in that language.

== Bibliography ==
- Bonilla y San Martín, A. (1911). Fernando de Córdova (¿1425–1480?) y los orígenes del Renacimiento filosófico en España: Episodio de la historia de la Lógica. Real Academia de la Historia.
- Monfasani, John (1992). Fernando of Cordova: A Biographical and Intellectual Profile. American Philosophical Society.
- Motis Dolader, Miguel Ángel (2018). "Córdoba, Fernando de". Diccionario biográfico español. Real Academia de la Historia.
