= Paul Outerbridge =

American photographer (1896–1958)

Paul Outerbridge, Jr. (August 15, 1896 – October 17, 1958) was an American photographer known for pioneering the carbon-transfer printing process in color photography. His work included still lives, fashion photography, advertising, and provocative female nudes.

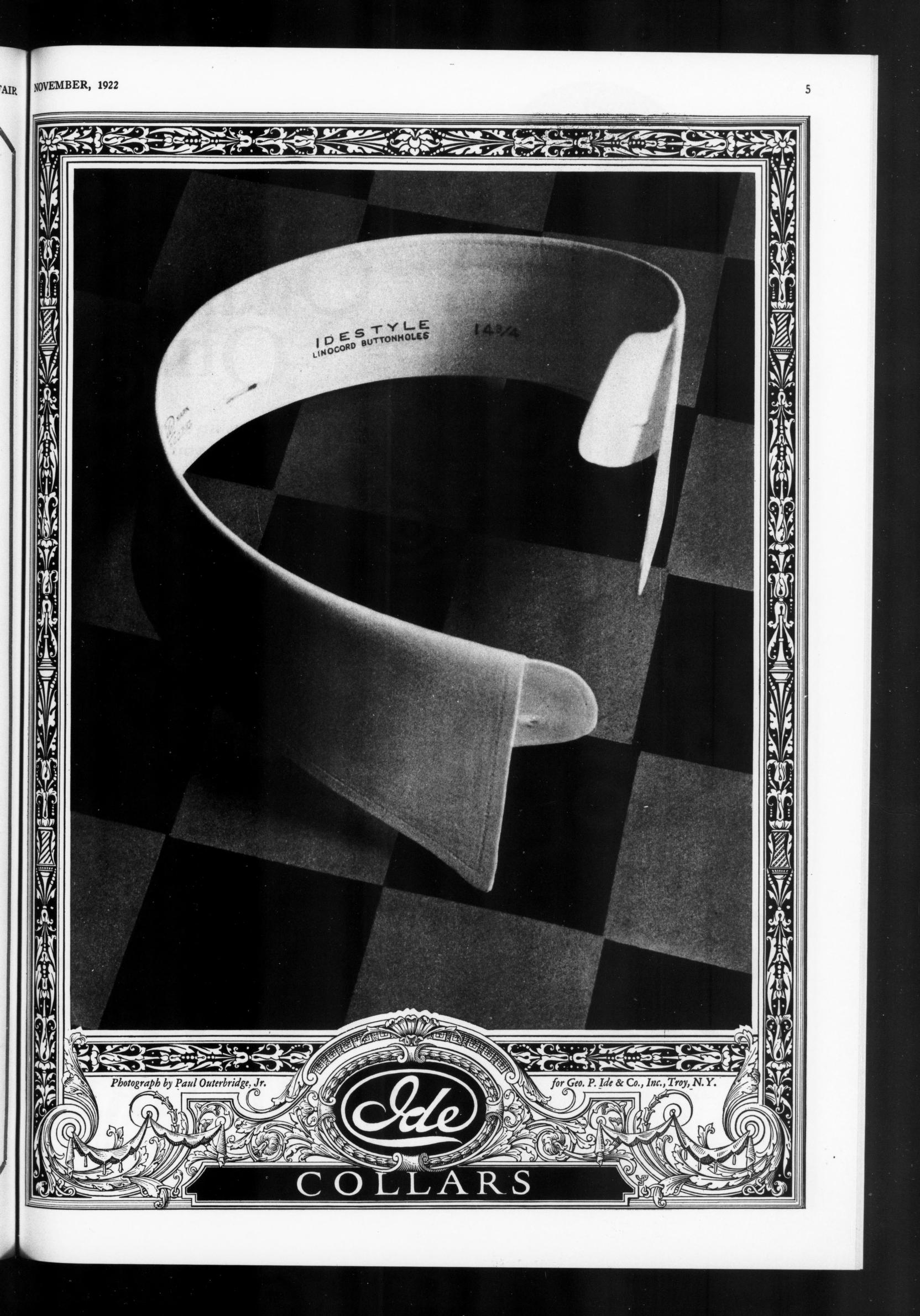
Paul Outerbridge, Advertisement for Ide Collars, Vanity Fair, November 1922

Throughout his career, Outerbridge struggled to keep consistent employment. He faced criticisms for his erotic nudes and clashed with collectors and museums over his work. He is regarded today as one of the most imaginative and influential American photographers of his day.

== Early life ==
Paul Outerbridge was born in New York City and raised by his mother and father, who did not allow him to attend school until he was eleven. After graduating from the Cutler School, Outerbridge did not pursue a university education, but instead took classes in life drawing and anatomy at the Art Students’ League in New York. Determined to pursue an artistic profession despite discouragement from his father, Outerbridge began to do some freelance illustration work, such as designing a cover for Judge magazine and various posters for Wintergarden Review.

Outerbridge was 21 years old when the U.S. entered World War I. He joined the Royal Flying Corps and was eventually discharged, but then he entered the American Army and was sent to Oregon. It was in Oregon that Outerbridge found his passion for photography, as his job there involved taking numerous photographs for documentary purposes. When Outerbridge eventually returned to Greenwich Village, he married his wife Paula in the summer of 1921. Their marriage would only last 7 years; the pair divorced in 1928.

== Still-life photography ==
In the summer of 1921, Outerbridge began to quickly produce photographs of everyday objects, such as a bowl of eggs, milk bottles, or light bulbs. Outerbridge had a unique conceptual approach to still life photography, as his manipulation of light, shadow, planes, and shapes produced a simultaneous tension and balance in his works. His earliest success is attributed to two still life pieces entitled Milk Bottle and Eggs and Ide Collar, both photographed in 1922. The photographs were featured as full pages in the Vanity Fair Magazine. French painter and sculptor Marcel Duchamp saw Ide Collar and was immediately impressed by its abstract qualities and its similarity to the "readymade" object. Duchamp tore out the photograph from Vanity Fair and hung it on the wall of his studio, where Outerbridge would see it when he eventually visited Duchamp’s studio in Paris many years later.

=== Technique ===
The skill of Outerbridge’s still life photography lies in his strategic manipulation and design of shadows and light; the artist used these as kinetic elements in his photographs, more than just byproducts of the objects themselves. Outerbridge preferred to use artificial lighting in his studio in order to more carefully control the photographic outcome. He would begin his creative process by conceiving his images with an initial crayon sketch of the composition. Then, Outerbridge would arrange the objects according to his sketch and photograph them. While he used several different types of cameras to capture his work, he most often used a Korona View camera. Outerbridge contact-printed most of his early still-life photographs in palladium or platinum, which gave them a matte appearance and wide tonal range.

== Commercial photography ==
In 1925, Outerbridge and his wife left New York and sailed to Europe, spending five weeks in London before moving on to Paris. As a consequence of his visit to Europe was given temporary honorary members of the Royal Photographic Society. In Paris, he became well acquainted with American visual artist Man Ray, and the two remained frequent companions. It was Man Ray who introduced Outerbridge to Marcel Duchamp. In May 1929, Outerbridge was hired by Paris Vogue as a photographer of fashion accessories, where he primarily designed layouts for the magazine. He worked alongside photographer Edward Steichen, who was hired as chief photographer. However, Outerbridge’s behavior at Vogue caused friction amongst his colleagues, and the artist was asked to resign from Paris Vogue after three months. Outerbridge continued to sell photographs to Vogue on a project-by-project basis. While Edward Steichen stayed at Vogue, the relationship between the two photographers remained quite competitive.

While still in Paris, Outerbridge and mannequin manufacturer Mason Siegel set about creating the “world’s greatest photographic studio." This studio was intended to have the latest equipment, and it generated great excitement and expectation. However, less than a year after its grand opening, the photographic studio proved unsuccessful and was shut down.

=== Carbro-color printing process ===
Later in 1929, Outerbridge returned to New York City and began to research different types of color photographic processes, including the tri-color carbro technique. The carbro-color process was an expensive endeavor that required many hours of work to produce a photograph. This subtractive process required three different color filters, as well as three exposures of different durations; however, the process yielded highly saturated and vibrant results. Outerbridge estimated that each finished print took an estimated 9 hours and $150 to produce. He began to show his color photographs in 1936. Because there was a high demand for color photography at this time, Outerbridge began to work comfortably as a freelance color photographer. He spent two years writing a book entitled Photographing in Color, which was published in 1940 by Random House. His book describes and explains three different color printing processes: chromatone, wash-off relief, and carbro.

== The female nude and fetish photography ==
As Outerbridge started to work in color photography, he also began to explore the female nude. Largely inspired by Man Ray’s experimentalist style, he produced fetish art with sexual themes. A common characteristic of his female nudes is the avoidance of eye contact between the model and the viewer. This was because Outerbridge was of the firm opinion that “the nude should be impersonal; a fatal error is to have your model establish a personal or intimate contact with the person viewing the picture." Outerbridge also pushed the idea that the world of art simply needed more and better nudes. He believed that if the general public were more exposed to the naked body, then we would naturally “begin to see a higher standard of physical beauty and better maintained bodies." In 1936, Outerbridge’s Dutch Girl became the first color photograph of a female nude to be displayed in Washington at the Smithsonian Institution. According to critics, the flesh tones of this nude were "more credible than any former color photograph had been able to achieve."

=== Criticisms and censorship ===
Many critics saw Outerbridge's nudes as highly suggestive, shocking, and ill-suited to the general public. He frequently ran into conflicts with the photography company Eastman Kodak over the ban on nipples and pubic hair in publicly published photographs. Outerbridge defended his nude photographs, and stated that the censorship of certain body parts gave innocent pictures unnecessary pornographic connotations. However, the moral censorship of collectors and museums limited which of his works could be acquired for public collections. However, from the 1930s through the 1950s, Outerbridge pursued nude photography despite public criticism and censorship. Some of his more extreme fetish images most likely went unpublished, were neglected, or kept only for his closest friends during his lifetime.

== Late career ==
In 1943, Outerbridge moved to Hollywood and set up a color portrait studio in Laguna Beach. In 1945, he met and married fashion designer Lois Weir. The pair created a joint company in the women’s fashions called Lois-Paul Originals. In 1950 he and Lois separated briefly and Outerbridge began to travel to countries such as Mexico, Uruguay, and Argentina, hoping to venture into photojournalism, but with little success. He began to write a successful monthly column entitled “About Color” that was published in the U.S. Camera magazine. However, in 1956, Outerbridge discovered that he had lung cancer; he died in October 1958 at the age of 62, despite numerous treatments. After his death, Lois continued to work with the Smithsonian in his stead, and she sold and donated much of Outerbridge’s work to various museums and buyers. Although his reputation has faded, revivals of Outerbridge's photography in the 1970s and 1990s periodically brought him back into public awareness.

== Books ==
- Outerbridge, Paul. Photographing in Color. New York: Random House, 1940.
- Howe, Graham (1976). Paul Outerbridge Jr. Los Angeles Center for Photographic Studies. ISBN 0917992016.
- Hawkins, G.; Howe, G.; Markham, J. (1980). Paul Outerbridge Jr. Photographs. New York: Rizzoli. p. 159. ISBN 978-0-8478-0281-4.
- Dines, E.; Howe, G. (1981). Paul Outerbridge Jr.: A Singular Aesthetic. Los Angeles: Arabesque Books. ISBN 0-940872-02-1.
- Howe, G. (1996). Nudes: Paul Outerbridge. Milan: Federico Motta Editore. pp. 60 pages. ISBN 978-88-7179-108-1.
- Paul Outerbridge: 1896-1958, Paul Outerbridge, Carol McCusker, Elaine Dines-Cox, M. F. Agha, and Manfred Heiting, Editor (1999), ISBN 978-3-8228-6618-4
- Graham Howe, with co-curators Ewing, W. and Prodger, P. Paul Outerbridge: New Color Photographs from Mexico and California, 1948–1955. Nazraeli Press, 2009. ISBN 978-1-59005-261-7
