= E. O. Hoppé =

German-born British photographer (1878–1972)

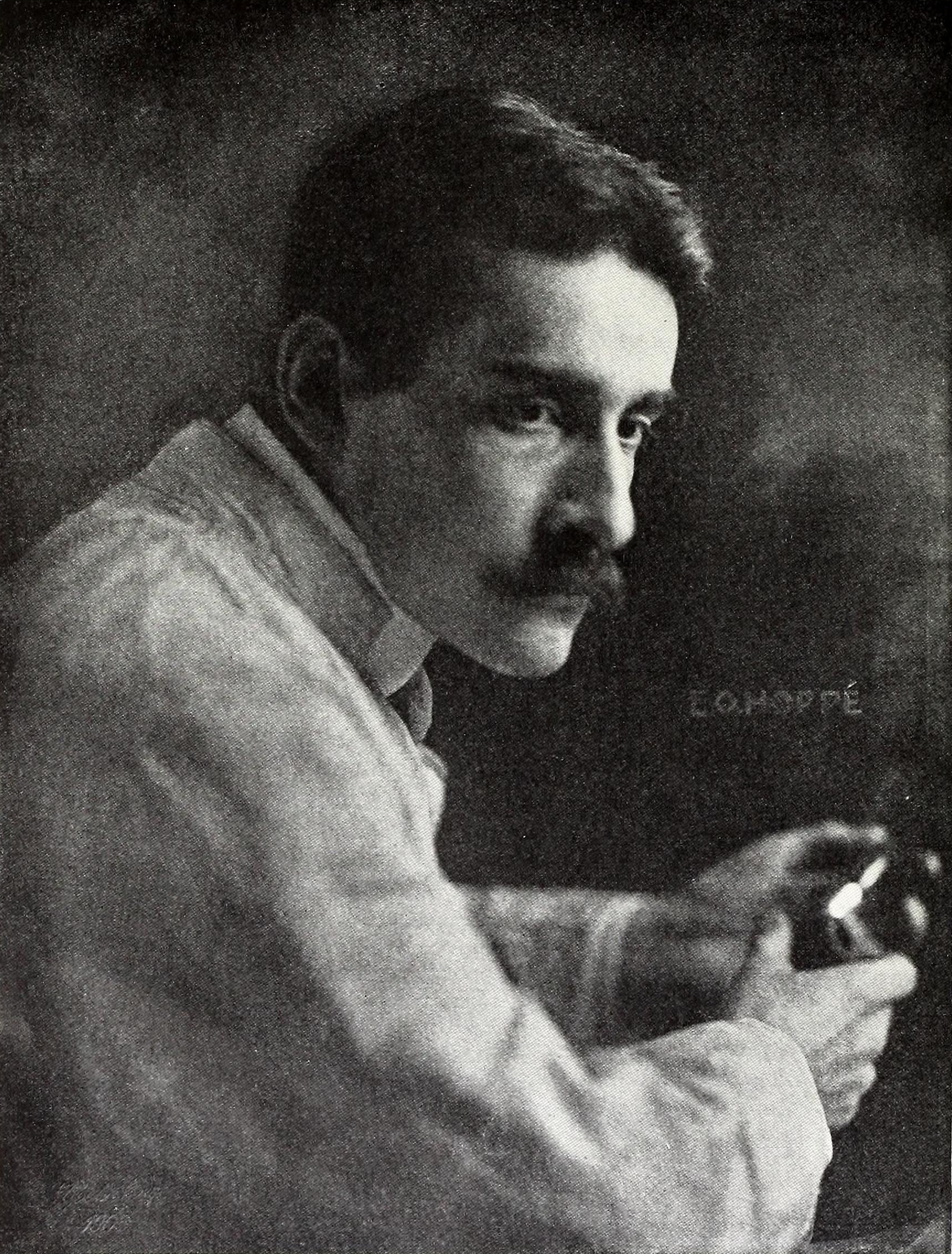
E. O. Hoppé

Emil Otto Hoppé (14 April 1878 – 9 December 1972) was a German-born British portrait, travel, and topographic photographer active between 1907 and 1945. Born to a wealthy family in Munich, he moved to London in 1900 to train as a financier, but took up photography and rapidly achieved great success.

He was the only son of a prominent banker, and was educated in the finest schools of Munich, Paris and Vienna. Upon leaving school he served apprenticeships in German banks for ten years, before accepting a position with the Shanghai Banking Corporation. He never arrived in China. The first leg of his journey took him to England where he met an old school friend. Hoppé married his old school friend's sister, Marion Bliersbach, and stayed in London. While working for the Deutsche Bank, he became increasingly enamoured with photography, and, in 1907, jettisoned his commercial career and opened a portrait studio. According to Bill Jay,

"Within a few years, E.O. Hoppé was the undisputed leader of pictorial portraiture in Europe. To say that someone has a "household name" has become a cliché, yet in Hoppé's case the phrase is apt. Rarely in the history of the medium has a photographer been so famous in his own lifetime among the general public. He was as famous as his sitters. It is difficult to think of a prominent name in the fields of politics, art, literature, and the theatre who did not pose for his camera."

Although Hoppé was one of the most important photographic artists of his era and highly celebrated in his time, in 1954, at the age of 76, he sold his body of photographic work to a commercial London picture archive, the Mansell Collection. In the collection, the work was filed by subject in with millions of other stock pictures and no longer accessible by author. Almost all of Hoppé's photographic work—that which gained him the reputation as Britain's most influential international photographer between 1907 and 1939—was accidentally obscured from photo-historians and from photo-history itself. It remained in the collection for over 30 years after Hoppé's death, and was not fully accessible to the public until the collection closed down and was acquired by new owners in the United States.

In 1994 photographic art curator Graham Howe retrieved Hoppé's photographic work from the picture library and re-joined it with the Hoppé family archive of photographs and biographical documents. This was the first time since 1954 that the complete E.O. Hoppé Collection was gathered together. Many years were spent in cataloguing, conservation and research of the recovered work.

== Work ==
=== Portraits and typologies ===
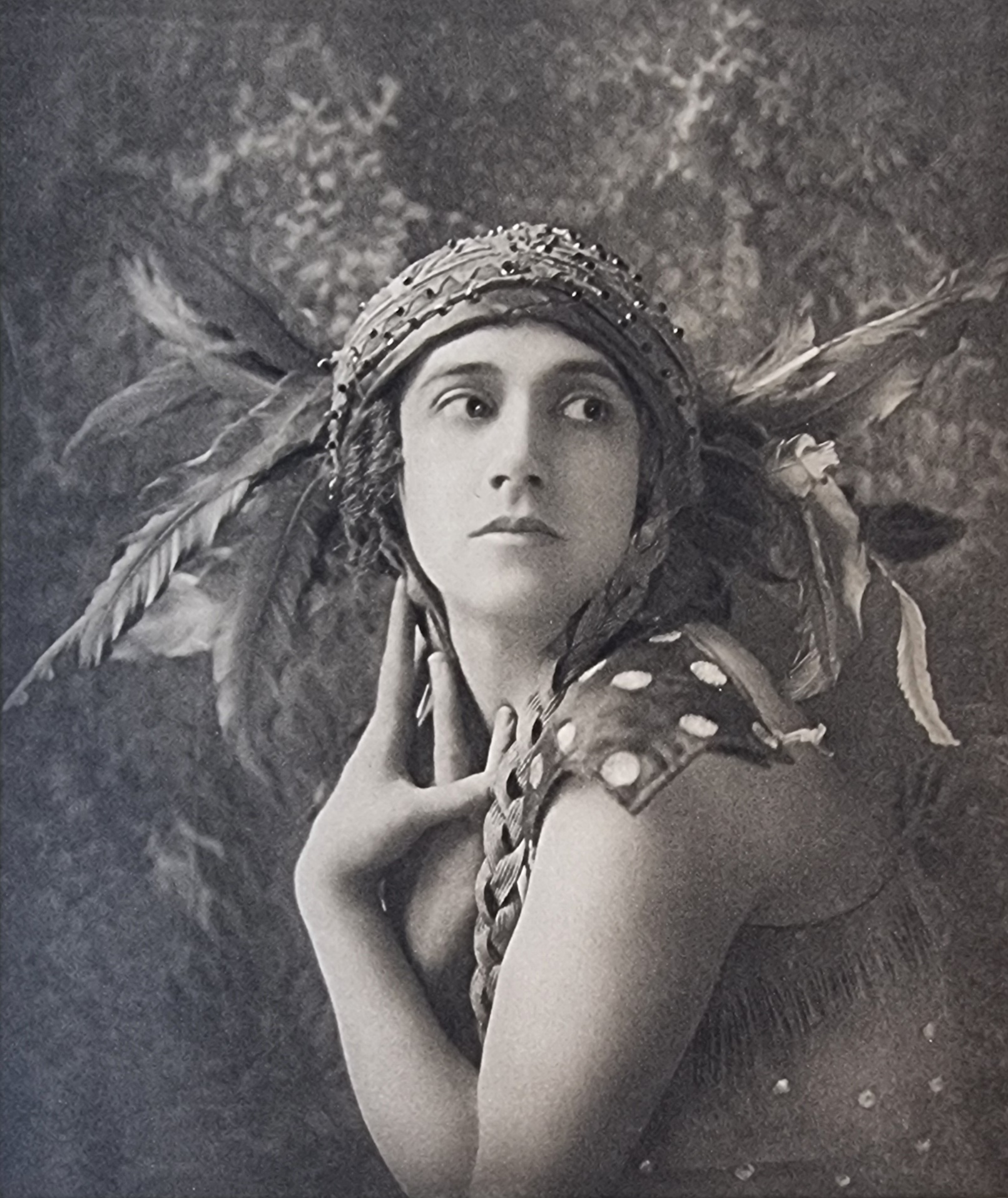
Thamer Karsavina in L'Oiseau de Feu, 1913, by Emil Otto Hoppé

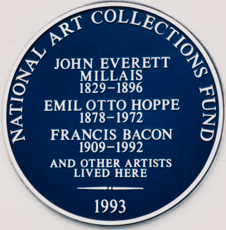
Blue plaque outside the house at 7 Cromwell Place, Kensington, London where Hoppe once lived from 1913

In his life, Hoppé's reputation attracted many important British and North American figures in politics, literature, and the arts. In the era before the first World War, Hoppé photographed many leading literary subjects and figures from the art world, such as Henry James, Rudyard Kipling, John Masefield, Léon Bakst, Anna Pavlova, Tamara Karsavina and other dancers of the Ballets Russes, Violet Hunt, Richard Strauss, Jacob Epstein and William Nicholson, some of whom were included in his 1913 exhibition. In the early 1920s he was invited to photograph Queen Mary, King George, and members of the royal family. Other subjects of the 1920s included Albert Einstein, Benito Mussolini, Robert Frost, Aldous Huxley, George Bernard Shaw and A.A. Milne. In the 1930s Hoppé photographed a number of dancers at the Vic-Wells company including Margot Fonteyn, Ninette de Valois, Hermione Darnborough and Beatrice Appleyard.

In 1925 he contributed female nude portraits to Peter Landow's book Natur und Kultur: Das Weib ("Nature and Culture: Woman").

Working from a studio first in London's Baron's Court at 10 Margravine Gardens (1907–10), he later moved in 1911 to a Baker Street studio. In 1913 he took on a lease of 7 Cromwell Place, occupying all thirty-three rooms of the previous home of Sir John Everett Millais, which later (from 1937) was used by dance photographer Gordon Anthony and subsequently Francis Bacon. Hoppé also made portraits of the street types of London: he photographed English cleaners, maids, and street vendors both in his studio and on the street. He continued this practice of capturing ordinary working men and women throughout his career as he traveled throughout the world.

=== Travel and landscape ===
By 1919, Hoppé had begun to travel the world in search of new subjects and landscapes. His journeys brought him to Africa, Germany, Poland, Romania, Czechoslovakia, the United States, Cuba, Jamaica and the West Indies, Australia, New Zealand, Japan, Indonesia, Singapore, Malaya, India and Ceylon. The resulting photographs were published in a number of books. A book from his trip to Germany was published in 1930 by Ullstein Verlag under the title "Deutsche Arbeit - Bilder vom Wiederaufstieg Deutschlands."

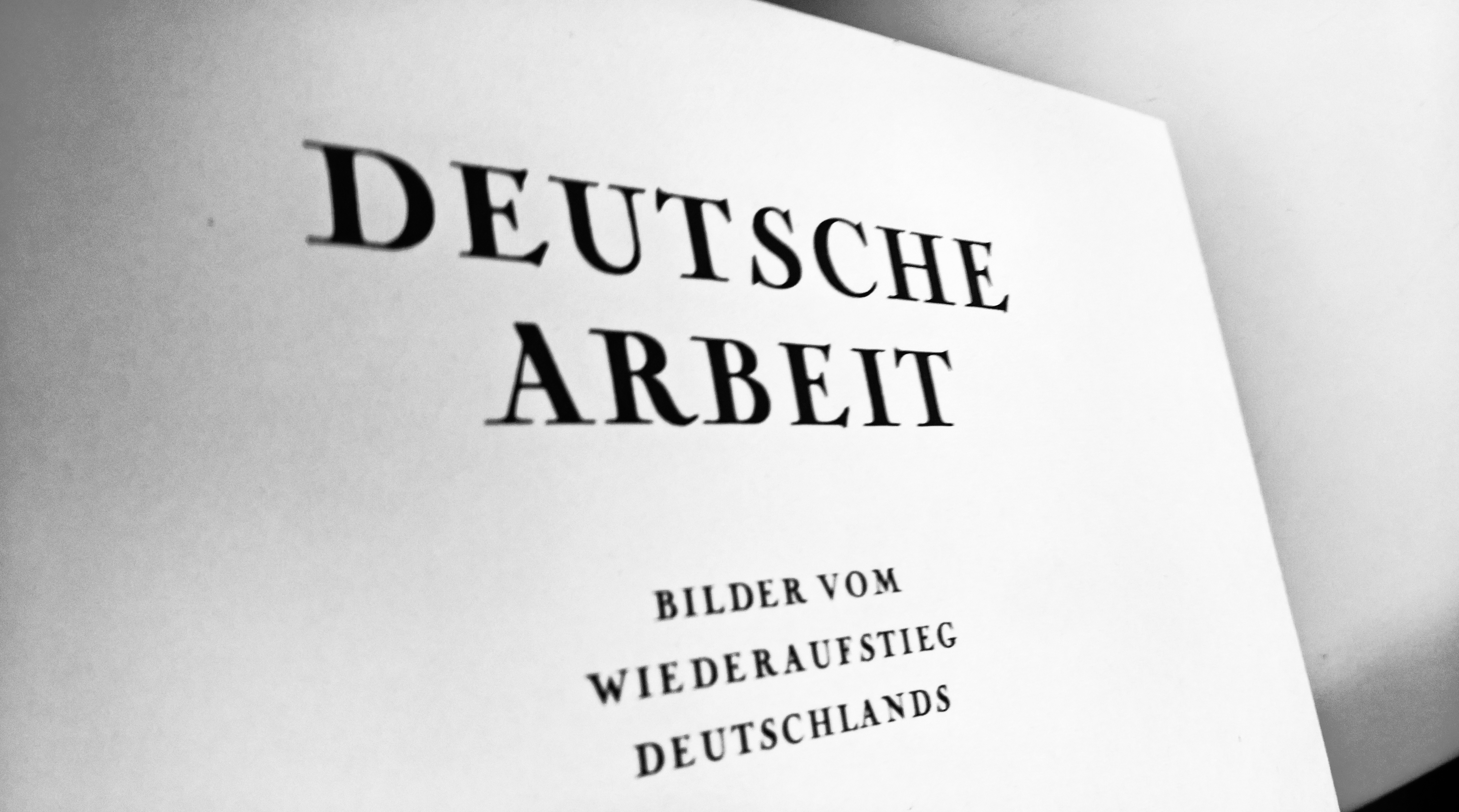
German work - Pictures of Germany's resurgence - Ullstein Verlag Berlin - 1930

== Publications ==
- Studies from the Russian Ballet. E. O. Hoppé and Auguste Bert. London: Fine Art Society, 1913.
- New Camera Work by E. O. Hoppé. Introduction by John Galsworthy. London: Goupil Gallery, 1922.
- The Book of Fair Women. New York: Knopf, 1922 and London: Jonathan Cape, 1922.
- Taken From Life. John Davys Beresford, with seven photogravure plates by E. O. Hoppé. London: W. Collins Sons & Co., Ltd., 1922.
- Gods of Modern Grub Street: Impressions of Contemporary Authors. Arthur St. John Adcock, with 32 portraits by E. O. Hoppé. London: Sampson Low, Marston and Co., 1923.
- In Gipsy Camp and Royal Palace: Wanderings in Rumania. Written and illustrated by E. O. Hoppé, preface by the Queen of Rumania. London: Methuen and Co., Ltd., 1924.
- To Rome on a Sunbeam: With Camera Studies by E. O. Hoppé. Wolverhampton: Sunbeam Motor Car Company Ltd., 1924.
- A Collection of Photographic Masterpieces by E. O. Hoppé. Exhibition Catalogue. Tokyo: Tokyo Asahi Shimbun Hakkojo, 1925.
- London Types: Taken from Life. E. O. Hoppé. Text by W. Pett Ridge. London: Methuen and Co., Ltd., 1926.
- Forty London Statues and Public Monuments. Tancred Borenius, with special photographs by E. O. Hoppé. London: Methuen & Co., Ltd., 1926.
- Fire Under the Andes: A Group of North American Portraits. Elizabeth Shepley Sergeant, photographs by E. O. Hoppé. New York: Knopf, 1927.
- Romantic America: Picturesque United States. E. O. Hoppé. New York: B. Westermann Co., Inc., 1927. And Das Romantische Amerika. Berlin: Ernst Wasmuth Verlag AG, 1927.
- The Glory that was Grub Street: Impressions of Contemporary Authors. Text by Arthur St. John Adcock, with 32 portraits by E. O. Hoppé. London: Sampson, Low, Marston & Co., 1928.
- The Story of the Gipsies. Konrad Bercovici, with 8 plates by E. O. Hoppé. London: Cape, 1929.
- Deutsche Arbeit ("German Work"). E. O. Hoppé. Introduction by Bruno H. Burgel. Berlin: Ullstein, 1930.
- The Fifth Continent. E. O. Hoppé. London: Simpkin Marshall Ltd., 1931.
- Romantik der Kleinstadt ("Romantic Towns"). E. O. Hoppé. Munich: Verlag F. Bruckmann, 1932.
- Unterwegs ("In Passing"). E. O. Hoppé. Berlin: Ernst Pollak Verlag, 1932.
- London. E. O. Hoppé. London: Medici Society (Picture Guide Series), 1932.
- The Face of Mother India. Katherine Mayo. London: Hamish Hamilton, 1935.
- The Image of London. E. O. Hoppé. London: Chatto & Windus, 1935.
- A Camera on Unknown London: Sixty Photographs and Descriptive Notes of Curiosities of London to be Seen Today. E. O. Hoppé. London: J. M. Dent and Sons Ltd., 1936.
- The London of George VI. by E. O. Hoppé. London: J. M. Dent and Sons Ltd., 1937.
- Country Days. Text taken from A.G. Street's BBC Broadcasts, with 8 photographs by E. O. Hoppé. London: Faber, 1940.
- Hundred Thousand Exposures: The Success of a Photographer. E. O. Hoppé. Introduction by Cecil Beaton. London and New York: Focal Press, 1945.
- Rural London in Pictures. E. O. Hoppé. London: Odhams Press Ltd., 1951.
- Blaue Berge von Jamaica ("Blue Mountains of Jamaica"). Karl-Heinz Jaeckel. Berlin: Safari Verlag, 1956.
- Pirates, Buccaneers and Gentlemen Adventurers. E. O. Hoppé. New Jersey: Barnes and London: Yoseloff, 1972.
- Camera Portraits by E. O. Hoppé, 1878-1972. Terence Pepper. Catalogue for an exhibition organized by the National Portrait Gallery, London. London: The National Portrait Gallery, 1978.
- Cities and Industry : Camera Pictures by E. O. Hoppé. Edited by Val Williams and Terence Pepper, with essay by Ian Jeffrey. York: Impressions Gallery, 1978.
- Hoppé's London. Mark Haworth-Booth. London: Guiding Light, 2006.
- E. O. Hoppé's Amerika: Modernist Photographs from the 1920s. Phillip Prodger. New York: W. W. Norton & Co., 2007.
- E. O. Hoppé's Australia. Edited by Graham Howe, with essays by Erika Esau and Graham Howe. New York: W. W. Norton & Co., 2007.
- E. O. Hoppé's Santiniketan: Photographs from 1929. With essays by Pratapaditya Pal and Graham Howe. Mumbai: the Marg Foundation and Curatorial Assistance, Inc., 2010.
- E. O. Hoppé's Bombay: Photographs from 1929. With essays by Pratapaditya Pal and Graham Howe. Mumbai: the Marg Foundation and Curatorial Assistance, Inc., 2010.
- Hoppé Portraits: Society, Studio and Street. Phillip Prodger and Terence Pepper. London: National Portrait Gallery, 2011.
- One Hundred Photographs: E. O. Hoppé and the Ballets Russes. Essays by John Bowlt, Graham Howe and Oleg Minin. Moscow: Art of the XXI Century, (Iskusstvo-XXI), 2012.
- E. O. Hoppé's Indian Subcontinent of the Cusp of Change. Mumbai: Marg Publishing, 2013.
- E. O. Hoppé: The German Work, 1925–1938. Phillip Prodger. Göttingen: Steidl Verlag, 2015.
- E. O. Hoppé: Photographs of Greater Romania, 1923. Adrian Silvan Ionescu, Graham Howe, Marika Lundeberg and Michelle Dragoo. Pasadena, California: Curatorial Books, 2019.

== Exhibitions ==
- International Exhibition of Photography, Dresden, 1909
- Royal Photographic Society, London, 1910
- Modern Camera Portraits by E.O. Hoppé, Goupil Gallery, London, 1913
- Studies from the Russian Ballet, Ryder Gallery, Conduit Street, London, 1914
- Wanamaker's Gallery, New York, 1921
- New Camera Work by E.O. Hoppé, Goupil Gallery, London, 1922
- Victoria and Albert Museum, Theatre Exhibition, 1922
- Photographic Masterpieces by E.O. Hoppé, staged by Asahi Shimbun, Tokyo and Osaka, 1925
- Dover Gallery, London, 1927
- 79 Camera Pictures, David Jones, Sydney, 1930
- A Half Century of Photography, Foyles Art Gallery, London, 1954
- A Half Century of Photography, Lenbachhaus, Munich, 1954
- A Half Century of Photography, traveling exhibition by the British Council in India, 1954–56
- Retrospective, Kodak Gallery, London, 1968
- Camera Portraits by E.O.Hoppe, National Portrait Gallery, London, 1978
- Cities and Industry : Camera Pictures by E.O. Hoppé, Impressions Gallery, York, 1978
- London, Michael Hoppen Gallery, London, 2006
- Amerika, Bruce Silverstein Gallery, New York, 2007
- Australia, Customs House, Sydney, 2007
- Discoveries, Bruce Silverstein Gallery, New York, 2010
- Hoppé Portraits: Society, Studio & Street, National Portrait Gallery, London, 2011
- In Search of America: Photography and the Road Trip, Saint Louis Art Museum, St. Louis, 2025

== Collections ==
- National Portrait Gallery (London)
- Victoria and Albert Museum, London
- Bibliothèque Nationale, Paris
- National Media Museum, Bradford
- George Eastman House at Rochester
- Harry Ransom Center at the University of Texas at Austin (Gernsheim Collection)
- New York Public Library
- National Gallery of Australia, Canberra
- National Museum of American History, Washington, D.C.

=== Galleries ===
- Craig Krull Gallery, Los Angeles
- Bruce Silverstein Gallery, New York
- Josef Lebovic Gallery, Sydney

== See also ==
- Modernism
