= Nicolaus de Mirabilibus =

Transylvanian Dominican theologian (died 1495)

The incunable Disputatio nuper facta in domo Magnifici Laurentii Medices from 1489, an account of Nicolaus' debate with Dragišić in Florence

Nicolaus de Mirabilibus (Italian: Niccolò de' Mirabili; died 1495) was a Transylvanian Dominican preacher and theologian.

== Life ==
Nicolaus (or Nicholas) was born into a Florentine expatriate family in Kolozsvár (Cluj), then part of the Kingdom of Hungary. He referred to himself as ex Sepetm Castris, "from Transylvania". He joined the Dominicans in Kolozsvár, later transferring to the convent of Košice (Kassa). He moved to Buda in 1478 and later to Italy to continue his studies. He received bachelor's and master's degrees from the University of Padua in 1481 and 1483, respectively. He was theologically a Thomist and philosophically a well trained Aristotelian. His writings bear the stamp of a scholasticism out of step with the latest humanist currents.

Nicolaus was named regent successively of the university of Siena (1484), the Dominican studium of Santa Maria sopra Minerva in Rome (1488) and the studium of Santa Maria Novella in Florence (1488–1489). On 23 June 1489, a public debate between the Franciscans and Dominicans was held in Duomo of Florence on the question of whether or not the sin of Adam was the greatest of sins. On 30 June, Lorenzo de' Medici invited Nicolaus and the Bosnian Franciscan Juraj Dragišić to a banquet in the Palazzo Vecchio to continue the debate. Both philosophers published accounts of the second encounter.

Nicolaus returned to Hungary in 1489. King Matthias Corvinus received a glowing letter of recommendation from Marsilio Ficino on his behalf, in which Ficino calls him Thomas Aquinas reborn: "Either Thomas has been reborn in Nicolaus, as a Platonist might think, or Thomas at least looks on him with favour from on high and inspires his speech". He served in 1489 as regent of his alma mater, the studium of Buda. In 1490, he was a preacher at the court of Corvinus. In 1493, he received permission to lecture at the court of King Vladislaus II. In 1493, he became the vicar general of the Franciscan province of Hungary and prior of Buda. He served as an inquisitor for all Hungary from at least September 1493. He died early in 1495, according to a letter of Gioacchino Torriani.

== Works ==
Nicolaus wrote three known works, one in Italian and two in Latin:

- A Small Book on Conscience (Italian Libello de conscientia), based on a sermon delivered to the nuns of San Pietro Martire in 1488 and written down at their request a few months later. He argues that synderesis (the natural inclination to do good) and conscience (the judgement immediately preceding action) cannot err, but that reasoning may err, not in universal matters, but in particular. So:
  For example reason says: "no act of adultery is legitimate". On the other hand it says: "every act of adultery is enjoyable". In those common and universal notions reason judges without error. . . But when reason is weaker than sensuality, then it allows itself to be defeated. . . and defeated by sense it will say: "let us go then to that person". Reason now will follow the conclusions derived from that true notion: "every adultery is enjoyable"; every enjoyable matter is good; and thus going to that woman is good in so far as it is enjoyable.
- A Debate Which Took Place Recently in the House of Lorenzo de' Medici the Great (Latin Disputatio nuper facta in domo Magnifici Laurentii Medices), an account of his debates with Dragišić, printed at Florence on 27 July 1489. Dragišić later wrote his own account, which partially responds to Nicolaus' Disputatio. Nicolaus accuses his opponent of heresy.
- On Predestination (Latin De praedestinatione), also called On Providence (De providentia), based on a sermon preached before Vladislaus II on 23 June 1493. The single manuscript contains a dedicatory letter to Johann von Schellenberg, chancellor of Bohemia, dated September 1493. Nicolaus argues against determinism that humans are free agents who do not act under compulsion, but that God knows in advance how they will freely act:
  God right from the very outset created man and left him in the hands of his counsels. . . From this it seems easy how the error of the Stoics should be utterly condemned; since they held that everything originates from some necessity according to some indomitable sequence of causes, which the Greeks call "destiny".

He planned to write a treatise On True Happiness, but it appears it was never written.

== Bibliography ==
- Edelheit, Amos (2013). "Some Remarks on Method and Practice in Renaissance Philosophy and the Concept of Conscience as a Case-Study" (PDF). Maynooth Philosophical Papers. 7: 1–19. doi:10.5840/mpp201373.
- Edelheit, Amos (2014). Scholastic Florence: Moral Psychology in the Quattrocento. Brill.
- Kosztolnyik, Z. J. (1988). "Some Hungarian Theologians in the Late Renaissance". Church History. 57 (1): 5–18. JSTOR 3165899.
- Kraye, Jill (1996). "Lorenzo and the Philosophers". In Michael Mallett; Nicholas Mann (eds.). Lorenzo the Magnificent: Culture and Politics. University of London Press. pp. 151–166.
- Saccenti, Riccardo (2013). "Niccolò de' Mirabili". Dizionario Biografico degli Italiani (in Italian). Vol. 78: Natta–Nurra. Rome: Institute of the Italian Encyclopaedia. ISBN 978-88-12-00032-6.
