= Sheila Pinkel =

American visual artist (born 1941)

- Born: 1941 (age 84–85); Newport News, Virginia, United States
- Education: University of California Los Angeles, University of California Berkeley
- Known for: Documentary photography, cameraless photography, installation art, public art
- Style: Conceptual art, political art
- Awards: National Endowment for the Humanities, National Endowment for the Arts, Center for the Study of Political Graphics
- Website: Sheila Pinkel

Sheila Pinkel (born 1941) is an American visual artist, activist and educator whose practice includes experimental light studies, photography, conceptual and graphic works, and public art. She first gained notice for cameraless photography begun in the 1970s that used light-sensitive emulsions and technologies to explore form; her later, socially conscious art combines research, data visualization, and documentary photography, making critical and ethical inquiries into the military-industrial complex and nuclear industry, consumption and incarceration patterns, and the effects of war on survivors, among other subjects. Writers identify an attempt to reveal the unseen—in nature and in culture—as a common thread in her work.

Sheila Pinkel, Grand Glory (Light Works), Luminous gelatin silver paper, 48" x 96", 1978–82. Collection of the Los Angeles County Museum of Art.

Pinkel has been awarded grants from the National Endowment for the Humanities, Center for the Study of Political Graphics and National Endowment for the Arts, among others. She has exhibited internationally and her work belongs to public collections including those of the Los Angeles County Museum of Art, Centre Pompidou, Hammer Museum, and Museum of Contemporary Photography. In addition to her art, Pinkel has written for journals including Leonardo, Afterimage and Heresies, and taught at Pomona College in Claremont, California. She lives and works In Los Angeles.

== Early life and career ==
Sheila Mae Pinkel was born in Newport News, Virginia in 1941 and raised in Cleveland and Los Angeles. Her father was a scientist who worked on confidential nuclear projects, something she only later learned of in the course of her research and artmaking on the subject; her grandfather was a ILGWU labor organizer, a fact also relevant to her work. As a woman growing up in the Nuclear Age and being close to those working in the industry she had quite the view of its ravaging effect on the world. Between the bombing of Hiroshima and the Cold War, Pinkel she was surrounded by a culmination of first world cruelty. This greatly impacted her art. In 1959, she enrolled at University of California Berkeley, attracted to its reputation for liberalism and political activism, and while there, participated in demonstrations over the Bay of Pigs invasion and HUAC while mainly studying sculpture.

After earning a BA in Art History in 1963, Pinkel worked as a researcher for the California State Legislature and did intermittent social science research, experiences that provided a foundation for later work she termed "information art." In the mid-1970s, she enrolled at University of California Los Angeles, remaining politically active, while studying with photographer Robert Heinecken. She completed studies in photography (MFA, 1977), without ever using a camera; inspired by her fascination with light and the infinite potential for form in nature, she studied non-mathematical aspects of light phenomena with physicist Don Villarejo, leading to a long period of experimentation with varied light sources and imaging techniques.

Sheila Pinkel, Crush (from "Thermonuclear Gardens"), Black-and-white photocopy produced on gelatin silver paper, 12" x 36", 1985.

== Work ==
Pinkel has moved freely across genres. Her early cameraless photography lies at the intersection of art and science, using diverse imaging technologies in abstract inquiries into the potential of form revealed by light. Beginning in the 1980s, she turned to highly political art, broadly influenced by conceptual artists such as Hans Haacke, Joseph Beuys and Allan Sekula; this work sometimes faced censorship. In the 1990s, Pinkel also extended her scope to documentary, exploring the experiences of disenfranchised groups from Cambodian refugees to American garment workers in longitudinal, multifaceted projects detailing narratives of history, trauma, cultural loss and survival.

=== Experimental light works (1974– ) ===
Pinkel's experimentations with light produced several extensive bodies of work dating back to her graduate studies. In her "Folded Paper" photograms (1974–82), she applied her understanding of sculpture to two-dimensional forms, exposing shaped and folded photographic paper, which after being developed and unfolded, resulted in a flat two-dimensional recording of the three-dimensional image. Los Angeles Times critic Suzanne Muchnic described them as "handsome abstractions with the gee-whiz appeal of successful illusionism and the longer-lasting satisfaction of well-composed subtleties"; Coast Magazine called them "startling glimpses into the heart of the union of form and light" combining technology and the hand of the artist. For "Manifestations of a Cube" (1974–9), Pinkel created what curator Kathy Rae Huffman called a "biography" of a small, square glass dish, capturing its essence in photograms, cyanotypes, video (the early digital film, Intuition, 1977), and other techniques.

Between 1978 and 1983, Pinkel worked with xeroradiography, an advanced X-ray technology normally used to detect cancerous breast tissue. She became fascinated with the internal complexities and delicacy of nature revealed by the technology, which made visible hidden dimensions in natural and human-made things. For works such as Peas (positive/negative) (1978–82) and Cherries (1982), she placed objects (small toys, animals and artifacts) onto a charged selenium plate, exposed it, and then made positive and negative prints described as simultaneously detailed and abstract, and radiating with energy. In the 1980s, this work gave way to mixed-media pieces and installations integrating light phenomena, archaeoastronomy and mythical aspects of culture, to produce sculptural installations, such as her "Solar Clocks and Moon Gardens," which functioned like sundials. During this time she also worked on black, grey and white two- and three-dimensional works entitled "Goethe Gardens," which appeared in brilliant color when viewed through a prism.

Pinkel's light works have been rediscovered by a new generation, with exhibitions of the "Folded Paper" and "Glass Rods" series (2015) and Manifestations of a Cube (2017) at Higher Pictures Generation in New York. Artforum described the latter show as "exceptionally rich, strange, mercurial, and vivid, pulsating with a mysterious energy." Since 2011, Pinkel has also worked on the "Lens Scans" project, scanning over 300 in museum and private collections to document the unique refractive "fingerprint" that each lens possesses.

In 2021, with Pinkelgraphs, she introduced a new way of perceiving light and its interaction with the physical world. Through simple means—a sheet of photographic paper and a single source of light— the artist embarked on a journey of discovery in the darkroom. By crushing and folding the paper into sculptures and then exposing it to light, she unveiled mysterious images that seemed latent within the paper itself. Each session in the darkroom became an adventure, revealing the infinite potential for form hidden within nature. Pinkel's early experiments with light laid the basis for her forty-year exploration of the interplay between form, light, and physicality.

=== Political art (1981– ) ===
In the mid-1980s, Pinkel began moving back and forth between her light works and engaged political art, sometimes combining them. Thermonuclear Gardens (1981–1991) was a series of twelve installations—its title a pun on military "plants"—that investigated the growth of the U.S. military-industrial complex and nuclear industry and its negative impact on the environment, health, jobs sectors and geo-political regions; it combined in-depth, footnoted research, text, light works, and photocopied and crumpled images (of fighter planes, hands and faces). Pinkel stated that she had "decided to make art installations as information artworks in order to educate others and myself" based on her belief that "people are empowered by information". Thermonuclear Gardens #5 (University of Southern California Atelier Gallery, 1985) focused on American arms sales, combining a central map indicating international weapon transaction locations, explanatory text, and take-out food containers housing dead plants above and below the map, which listed arms dealers. In Thermonuclear Gardens #12 (1991), Pinkel critiqued the nuclear and energy industries In works such as A Portal Into Tomorrow and Solar Energy by, for example, reproducing a glib ad for a personal radiation monitoring device alongside facts and personal statements detailing the actual dangers of radiation.

The graphic posters of Pinkel's "Consumer Research" companion series examined American consumption patterns and the politics of language. They juxtaposed shifting dictionary definitions of "consumer" or "consume"—destructive in 1962 and benign in 1979—and maps and images of the globe to explore commercial, political and ecological forms of First-to-Third World domination; Real Eyes, Realize, Real Lies (1988) featured a haunting image of a grizzled Native American, captioned with the title in stacked form. Related installations explored the fragility and temporality of nature, including Site/Unseen (2001), a tiled mural of prints of old and disappearing forests in Bali on top of Astroturf, some of it exposed by tile spaces left empty.

Sheila Pinkel, Kou Chang and Family, Chiang Kham Detention Camp, Thailand (from "Indochina Document" series), Inkjet print, 16" x 20", 1992.

=== Refugee and worker-related art (1989– ) ===
In the 1990s, Pinkel turned her attention to the plight of refugees throughout Southeast Asia. Initially inspired by curiosity about symbols on a large Hmong embroidery she purchased, she learned of the half-million Hmong and Cambodians in post-war refugee camps in Thailand. Further research led to extended trips in 1990, 1992, 2002 and 2004 to Thailand, Cambodia, Laos, Vietnam and Hmong villages in the Guizhou and Yunnan provinces in China to examine conditions and document the stories of displaced survivors and the ongoing effects of the Vietnam and Cambodian wars.

Pinkel synthesized five years of historical exploration into Indochina Document, a longitudinal work that included large photographic grids, journals and letters, albums, recordings and video directly addressing genocide and trauma and their effects on spiritual growth, wisdom and cultural heritage. Included were the installations Remember Cambodia (Pomona College, 1996; UCR/California Museum of Photography, 1998), which center on grids of everyday, color photographs and text documenting humble, contemporary survivors (refugees in Thailand and Los Angeles). They were placed on black-and-white backgrounds whose rectangles form images of mythical carvings found in the ancient Cambodian temple Angkor Wat, a current-day symbol of empowerment—the juxtaposition contextualizing and lending epic status to their specific struggles to preserve human life and culture, while also speaking to universal issues involving diaspora communities and threatened cultures. Artweek critic Pat Leddy wrote, "subconscious horror carries Pinkel's art toward an empathy" that was nonetheless "disquieting" against the ground of everyday American experience.

Pinkel's other major series, Hmong in Transition (California State University Los Angeles, 2001), followed a Hmong refugee family from Laos to Thai refugee camps to North Carolina in their twenty-year search for home, belonging, and a better life. Los Angeles Times critic David Pagel described its storyboard-like montage of enlarged color snapshots overlaid with quotes from interviews and letters as a bittersweet picture of lives uprooted by the terror and tragedy of war, which forced viewers to "reconcile the ordinariness of the sitters with the extraordinary suffering they have endured."

Pinkel also created several concurrent installations and public art projects publicizing issues confronting garment workers in Los Angeles, Bangkok, Thailand and Phnom Penh, Cambodia. These included large-scale text-image works placed on buses and abandoned department store fronts, a history of Los Angeles garment workers, and pieces juxtaposing images of worker strikes in the cities, emphasizing common experiences of injustice.

Sheila Pinkel, Site Unseen: Growth of Incarceration (from "Site Unseen: Incarceration"), Inkjet print, 180" x 96", 2003.

=== Prison-industrial complex and Site/Unseen works (1998– ) ===
Pinkel extended her interest in worker conditions in several series titled "Site/Unseen." Site/Unseen: Museum Guards (1998) contrasted the trappings of wealth and class in museum settings with the poor treatment of guards in an installation featuring personal testimonies, ghost-like, gilt framed photographs of guards printed as negatives—suggesting their invisibility—and glass vitrines displaying black work shoes and museum press materials.

Site/Unseen: The Prison-Industrial Complex (1999) examined prison labor through a vast matrix of prisoner-made products (including state and federal flags) reproduced out of a catalogue from Prison Industrial Authority, an agency based in a maximum-security prison. Pinkel interspersed image grids with facts about race and class biases in the federal justice system, revealing how viewers' proximity to ubiquitous products—their purchase mandated by bureaucratic rules—made them complicit with practices of unfree labor. Site/Unseen: Incarceration (2005), a multi-panel history of incarceration that included images of slavery, child labor and the Japanese internment, stirred controversy and was removed from a commemorative parole museum exhibition. Related works include Site/Unseen: Mumia Abu Jamal (2004), which visually connected elements of Abu Jamal's trial with aspects of injustice and racism in the overall prison system; Criminal Eyes/Human Eyes (2016), which probed issues of profit, community costs, race and class involved in incarceration; and an installation for the show "Made in America: Unfree Labor in the Age of Mass Incarceration" (Hampshire College, 2017).

== Recognition and collections ==
Pinkel has received grants from the National Endowment for the Humanities (2004), Mellon Foundation (1998), Sloan Foundation (1987, 1988, 1990) and National Endowment for the Arts (1982, 1979), among others, as well as a Hammer Award from the Center for the Study of Political Graphics (1996). She received public art commissions to create a gate in Los Angeles's Green Meadows Park (2003) and a mural at the Sherman Oaks Library (2001) about the life of the Tongva, Native Americans who predated the Spanish in Los Angeles.

Pinkel's art belongs to the public collections of the Centre Pompidou (Paris), Los Angeles County Museum of Art, San Francisco Museum of Modern Art, Denver Museum of Art, Hammer Museum, Musee national d’histoire et d’art Luxembourg, Minneapolis Institute of Art, Museum of Contemporary Art San Diego, Museum of Contemporary Photography, and Seattle Art Museum, among others.

== Other professional activities ==
Pinkel has worked as a writer, curator and teacher. A long-time contributor to Leonardo, she has also written for Afterimage, Frame-work, Heresies, High Performance, and Obscura, among others. She has also written and produced several books, including Kou Chang’s Story (1993, with Kou Chang), Refocus: Multicultural Focus (2011), and Weavers of Varanasi (2015), as well as several catalogues of her work and curated exhibitions. She has curated exhibitions at the Los Angeles Municipal Gallery ("Multicultural Focus," 1981), LACE, and the Los Angeles Center for Photographic Studies ("Missing: El Salvador", 1991), among other venues. Pinkel served on the art faculty at Pomona College (1986–2011), teaching courses including documentary photography, experimental photography, history of photography and computer graphics before retiring as Emerita Professor of Art in 2012.
