= Juan de Lucena =

Spanish humanist (1430–1506)

Juan de Lucena (1430–1506) was a Spanish humanist.

== Biography ==
In 1476, Lucena created printing presses in two villages of the Province of Toledo: Villarejo de Montalbán and Toledo. These presses were utilized solely for printing Hebrew books. In particular, books that were in demand among the Jews living in Granada were printed by the presses, including the Bible, Orhot hayim, and Halakhot, the latter two having been written by Spanish Jews for legal purposes. All of these books were destroyed due to the Inquisition, causing the only remains of them to be small pieces. Lucena was the first known Spanish printer of Hebrew writings.

Before 1481, Lucena worked with Íñigo de Burgos and Pedro de Monbil, the former a converso like Lucena and the later a Christian. In 1481, the Inquisition investigated Lucena and Monbil. Lucena, along with his sons, fled from Spain, first going to Portugal. He later moved to Rome, Italy, where he served Pope Pius II as a position similar to an ambassador of the Catholic Monarchs.

Lucena wrote the dialogue Libro de vida beata. According to Martinez-Torrejon in the scientific journal Modern Language Notes, the work was dated from 1463 in Rome; however, the book Conversos, Inquisition, and the Expulsion of the Jews from Spain claims that Lucena did not flee to Rome until long after 1463, and that the work was written in Portugal, to which he had moved after 1481. The dialogue examines the concept of whether it is possible for humans to achieve happiness, concluding that it is not. Lorenzo Valla had said in 1431 that because humans seek goals and are satisfied when they achieve something, it is natural for them to achieve happiness. Due to a misunderstanding of the text, thinking that it was "a defense of face-value Epicureanism", the Inquisition prosecuted Valla in 1444. Bartolomeo Facio, who had been an opponent of Valla since 1446, wrote De felicitate in 1448, opposing the viewpoint of Valla. Facio's work is what Lucena based his dialogue on. According to Modern Language Notes, Libro de vida beta is a "privileged text for the study of the cultural movement in which it was produced".

Little information is available about Juan de Lucena's life and career, partially because of several other conversos of the fifteenth century having the same name.
