= Peter de Rivo =

Flemish philosopher

Peter de Rivo (Petrus) (c.1420 in Aalst – 1490 in Leuven) was a Flemish scholastic philosopher, teaching at the Old University of Leuven.

His views on future contingents were controversial, being opposed by Henry of Zomeren, also at Leuven (French: Louvain). De Rivo went to Rome in 1472 to defend his views to Pope Sixtus IV; they were condemned in 1473. Under pressure from the influence of Cardinal Bessarion to whom Henry had as secretary, de Rivo retracted partially his opinions in 1473, and more fully three years later. This meant that views going back at least to Peter Auriol, that future contingents lacked a truth value, had become heretical in the view of the Catholic Church.
