= Giovanni Nesi (philosopher) =

Italian philosopher (1456–1506)

Start of a manuscript of Nesi's De moribus (1484), illuminated by Mariano del Buono

Giovanni Nesi (1456–1506) was a Florentine philosopher of the Renaissance.

== Life ==
Nesi was born in Florence on 14 January 1456 to Francesco di Giovanni Nesi and Nera di Giovanni of the Spinelli family. His father served as one of the nine priori in 1456 and 1476. His family's wealth allowed Nesi to devote himself to letters and in 1495 he reported to the catasto that he did not have to work. He was a disciple of Donato Acciaiuoli and Marsilio Ficino and joined the Platonic Academy. He was prominent enough to be included in Ugolino Verino's De illustratione Urbis Florentiae. Verino also dedicated an epigram to him, Ad Ioannem Nesium, quomodo a peccatis sit abstinendum.

Nesi was a piagnone—a supporter of Girolamo Savonarola—and was actively involved in the Florentine Consulte e Pratiche. He served two terms as priore in May–June 1485 and January–February 1503 and two terms as one of the eight ufficiali of the Studio Fiorentino in 1497 and 1499. From 11 July 1505 to 5 January 1506, he was podestà of Prato, where he reformed the local statutes.

Nesi died at Florence between 15 November and 15 December 1506 and was buried in Santa Croce.

== Works ==
Nesi was at first, like his master, Acciaiuoli, an Aristotelian and a civic humanist. Under the influence of Ficino, he gradually turned to Neoplatonism and praise for the Medici. After Savonarola's return to Florence in 1490, Nesi experienced a religious conversion.

=== Sermons ===
Between 1472 and 1486, Nesi preached a series of sermons in vernacular Tuscan before the lay confraternities of Florence.

- Ioannis Nesii adulescentuli oratiuncula, preached before the Company of Saint Nicholas on 13 December 1472
- Orazione del Corpo di Cristo, preached before the Company of Saint Anthony of Padua on 7 April 1474
- Orazione de Eucharestia, preached before the Company of Saint Anthony on 23 March 1475
- Orazione sull'umiltà, preached before the Confraternity of the Nativity on 11 April 1476
- Sulla carità, preached before the Confraternity of the Nativity on 25 February 1478
- De charitate, preached before the Confraternity of the Magi on 23 March 1486
- Passione di Cristo, year unknown

=== Books ===
De moribus (1484) is a dialogue in four books dedicated to Piero di Lorenzo de' Medici. It is preserved in manuscript Plutei 77.24 in the Laurentian Library. It is an imagined discussion about Aristotle's Nicomachean Ethics in the house of Donato Acciaiuoli in 1477. The other participants, besides Acciaiuoli, were Jacopo Salviati, Filippo Valori, Bernardo di Alamanno de' Medici and Antonio Lanfredini. They are primarily concerned with good citizenship. The fourth book takes a Neoplatonic turn. In 1503, Nesi revised the work for publication, dedicating it to the youth of Florence. The revised version is found in manuscript 194 of the Burgerbibliothek of Bern, but it was never published.

Oraculum de novo saeculo was published at Florence by Lorenzo Morgiani in 1497. Dedicated to Giorgio Benigno Salviati in draft, the published work was dedicated to Giovanfrancesco Pico della Mirandola. Nesi describes a grand vision of things to come that Pico's uncle, Giovanni, then explains as revealing what Savonarola is building in Florence.

In the Symbolum nesianum, Nesi explains to the Camaldolese friar Paolo Orlandini the imagery he used in the Oraculum.

Nesi wrote two collections of poems, Canzoniere (1497–1498) and the incomplete Poema in terza rima (1499).
