= John of Ripa =

14th century theologian

John of Ripa (fl. 1357–1368) was a Franciscan philosopher, living and teaching in Paris.

John's philosophical interests included Christology and the metaphysics of awareness. He responded critically to the philosophy of Duns Scotus, and Augustinian scholar Damasus Trapp argues that he was also influenced by the thinking of Richard Brinkley. John, in turn, was an influence on Louis of Padua and Lambert of Gelderen.
