= Villarejo-Periesteban =

Villarejo-Periesteban, Spain
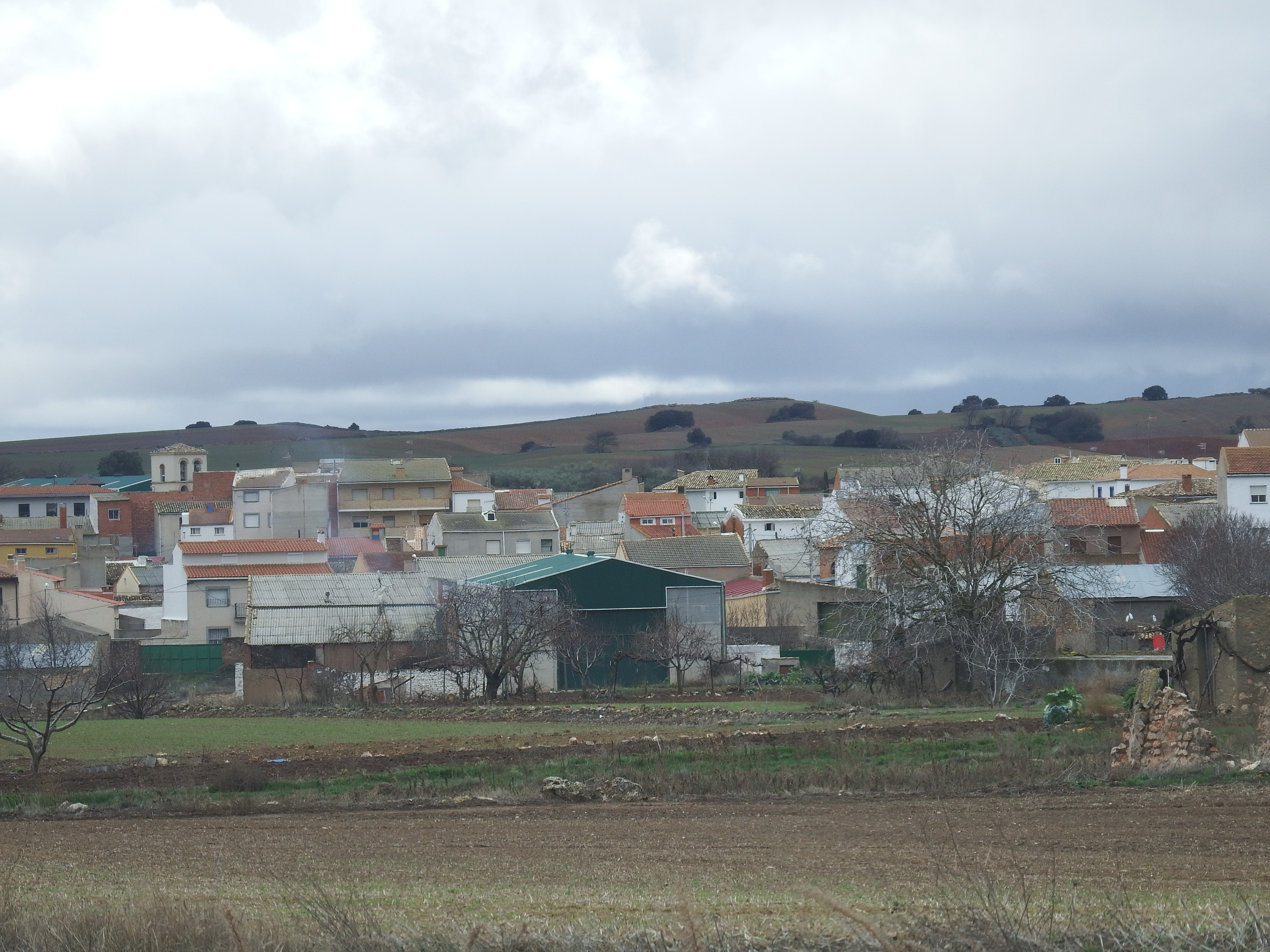
- View of Villarejo-Periesteban

- Flag Coat of arms

- Location within Spain Location within Castilla-La Mancha
- Coordinates: 39°53′N 2°27′W
- Country: Spain
- Autonomous community: Castile-La Mancha
- Province: Cuenca
- Municipality: Villarejo-Periesteban

Area
  - Total: 33 km^{2} (13 sq mi)

Population (2025-01-01)
  - Total: 375
  - Density: 11/km^{2} (29/sq mi)
- Time zone: UTC+1 (CET)
  - Summer (DST): UTC+2 (CEST)

Villarejo-Periesteban is a municipality located in the province of Cuenca, Castile-La Mancha, Spain. According to the 2004 census (INE), the municipality has a population of 510 inhabitants.
