= Pingel =

Pingel is a word in Middle Low German which means "little bell" or alternatively a "fussy person". It is also the surname of various people:

- Frank Pingel (born 1964), Danish footballer
- John Pingel (1916–1999), American footballer
- John L. Pingel (1834–1923), American farmer, businessman and politician
- Rolf Pingel (1913–2000), German Second World War fighter pilot
- Scott Pingel, American bassist
- Scott Pingel (American football), American football player and coach
