= Los Angeles Center for Photographic Studies =

American nonprofit arts organization

The Los Angeles Center for Photographic Studies (LACPS) was an artist-run nonprofit arts organization that presented photography exhibitions, lectures, and workshops in and around Los Angeles, California between 1974 and 2001.

== History ==
The Los Angeles Center for Photographic Studies was founded in 1974 by seven photographers, "to encourage the growth and appreciation of photography and to provide an infrastructure for study and exhibition".

Initially LACPS did not have a public space of its own. It held its programs at various venues, including Beyond Baroque, the Downey Art Museum, the Fullerton Museum Center, the Los Angeles Institute of Contemporary Art, Mount St. Mary's College, the Municipal Art Gallery, Security Pacific Plaza, and the University of Southern California.

In 1980, the center moved downtown to a third-floor gallery and office at 814 S. Spring Street. The neighborhood declined, so seven years later the organization moved out. The following year it received a $25,000 National Endowment for the Arts grant to finance permanent quarters. It opened a narrow 350 square feet (33 m^{2}) location at 1048 W. 6th Street in January 1990. The site's inaugural exhibition featured the photographs of Kim Yasuda and Jody Zellen and photographic mixed-media pieces by the team of Todd Gray and Stephan Reusse.

The center moved to a much larger 3,500 square feet (330 m^{2}) storefront at 6518 Hollywood Boulevard in 1994, and rebranded itself as Re:Solution. In 2000, evicted from its Hollywood premises and once again known as the Los Angeles Center for Photographic Studies, it began sharing the space of Side Street Projects. The last events publicized on its homepage were in January 2001, exhibitions of works by James Fee and Mark Bradford.

== Finances and leadership ==
LACPS was a small nonprofit, with only one full-time employee, the executive director, as of the 1980-81 fiscal year. That year the center's budget was about $50,000. Grants and the sales of publications supplied about two-thirds of its funds, while annual fees from its 500 members made up the balance.

Leadership positions were filled by artists Darryl Curran, Kathleen Gauss, Amelia Jones, Glenn Kaino, Robert Glenn Ketchum, and Sheila Pinkel, among others. Other active members included Jack Butler, Eileen Cowin and Grant Mudford.

== Publishing ==
LACPS published catalogs for at least some of its exhibitions. The most widely held is Paul Outerbridge Jr., for a 1976 historical exhibition of Outerbridge photographs, curated by Ketchum.

From 1980 to 1984, it published the journal Obscura, edited by Patrick Nagatani, five times a year. It merged with Camera lucida to become the triannual Frame-work from 1987 until publication ceased in 1997. The center also published a monthly events calendar.

== Legacy ==
Sight Specific: LACPS and the Politics of Community, a 2012 exhibition at the USC Fisher Museum of Art, traced the center's influence on the development in Los Angeles of photography as an art form.

== Los Angeles Center of Photography ==
In 1999, Julia Dean founded The Julia Dean Photo Workshops. In October 2013, The Julia Dean Photo Workshops became Los Angeles Center of Photography. In August, 2014, Los Angeles Center of Photography obtained 501(c)(3) tax-exempt status. Los Angeles Center for Photographic Studies and Los Angeles Center of Photography are separate organizations.
