= Don Villarejo =

Physicist and Social Justice Leader (1955–2021)

- Born: 17 January 1937
- Died: 19 November 2021 (aged 84)
- Education: University of Chicago
- Website: https://donvillarejo.github.io/

Don Villarejo (January 17, 1937 – November 19, 2021) was an American researcher, writer, and leader in the struggle for civil rights and social justice from 1955 until his death in 2021. His research career primarily focused on theoretical physics, chemical physics, and farmworker health and safety.

== Biography ==
Don Villarejo was born to June Blythe and Oscar Villarejo on January 17, 1937. While studying physics at the University of Chicago, he met and married his wife, Merna, in 1959. The couple had two daughters. Viillarejo died on November 19, 2021.

== Career ==
During the period of graduate study and a nine-month post-doctoral appointment at the University of Chicago, he published nine papers in scientific journals in both experimental and theoretical physics, and chemical physics. During the same period, he co-founded an independent quarterly magazine, New University Thought (NUT), and served on the editorial board for four years. He wrote two articles in NUT, both in political economy, one in the 1960 inaugural issue, the other, a lengthy, multi-part piece in 1961–62.

Villarejo's academic career was focused on physics. He joined the faculty of the Physics Department at the University of California, Los Angeles in 1968, serving until 1975. He taught physics part-time at the University of California Davis for several years thereafter.

=== Research for action ===
Villarejo moved to Davis in 1975. In 1976 he began volunteering with the United Farm Workers. Dr. Villarejo identified the need for an independent research organization to benefit farmers and farmworkers. This led to him serving as one of the founders of the California Agrarian Action Project (CAAP) (renamed the Community Alliance for Family Farmers in 1990) and the California Institute for Rural Studies (CIRS) in 1977.

CAAP was best known as the lead plaintiff in civil litigation filed by the California Rural Legal Assistance suing the University of California, its Cooperative Extension Service, some officials, and its Board of Regents, with conflicts of interest and failure to comply with Federal laws requiring land grant universities to serve farmworkers, small-scale family farmers, organic farmers and the rural poor. After prevailing in Alameda Superior Court and the state Appeals Court, ten years later, the case was dismissed by the California Supreme Court.

Villarejo served as executive director of CIRS from its founding until his retirement in 1999. CIRS is a private, non-profit research and education organization dedicated to helping create a rural California that is socially just, economically viable and ecologically balanced. The organization celebrated its 40th anniversary on March 21, 2017, at an event held in the Merced Multicultural Arts Center.

During his 22-year tenure at CIRS, Villarejo conducted original research into key issues impacting rural communities including land ownership, water policy, and farm worker jobs and their health.

=== Farmworker health and safety ===
Villarejo's best known research contribution with CIRS was the California Agricultural Worker Health Survey (CAWHS), a statewide, population-based survey of farmworker health that included a comprehensive physical examination. Publication of the findings resulted in a new $50 million initiative by The California Endowment to support expanded health services for farm laborers in the state. This effort led to the founding of the Western Center for Agriculture Health and Safety, in which he participated as a researcher for many years.

Recognition of Villarejo's depth of knowledge led to appointments to several expert panels commissioned to evaluate Federal programs. The National Academies/Institute of Medicine appointed him to serve on a 12-member Expert Panel to evaluate the National Institute for Occupational Safety and Health's program of research and intervention in the agriculture, forestry and fishing industries. He also served on a National Academies panel of experts to advise the Office of Government Accountability's evaluation of the USDA rural housing program in serving the nation's farm worker families.

Villarejo continued his cutting-edge research on behalf of farmworkers into his 80's. On July 25, 2020, he published his last paper “Increased Risks and Fewer Jobs: Evidence of California Farmworker Vulnerability During the COVID-19 Pandemic”, published by the California Institute for Rural Studies, Davis, CA, July 25, 2020.

=== Awards and recognition ===
Villarejo has received various awards recognizing his service. In 1988, he received the board of directors Award from the Mexican-American Concilio of Yolo County “…for your dedication.” In 1993, the Shalan Foundation presented him and CIRS staffer Luis Magaña with cash awards for “…exemplary commitment, dedication and vision in the area of economic and social justice.” In 2000 he received the National Service Award of the Office of Migrant Health (U.S. Department of Health & Human Services) for "Exemplary commitment, dedication and service to the nation's migrant farm workers." In January 2005, he received the first-ever Advocate of Social Justice Award, the “Justi”, at the Ecological Farming Association's 25th Annual Ecological Farming Conference.

On December 10, 2012, he was honored with a special lecture and ceremony co-sponsored by the Western Center for Agricultural Health and Safety, the University of California, Davis, and the National Institute for Occupational Safety and Health. John Howard, M.D., NIOSH Director, flew to California for the specific purpose of recognizing Villarejo in a special lecture.
