= Villarejo de Montalbán =

- Municipality
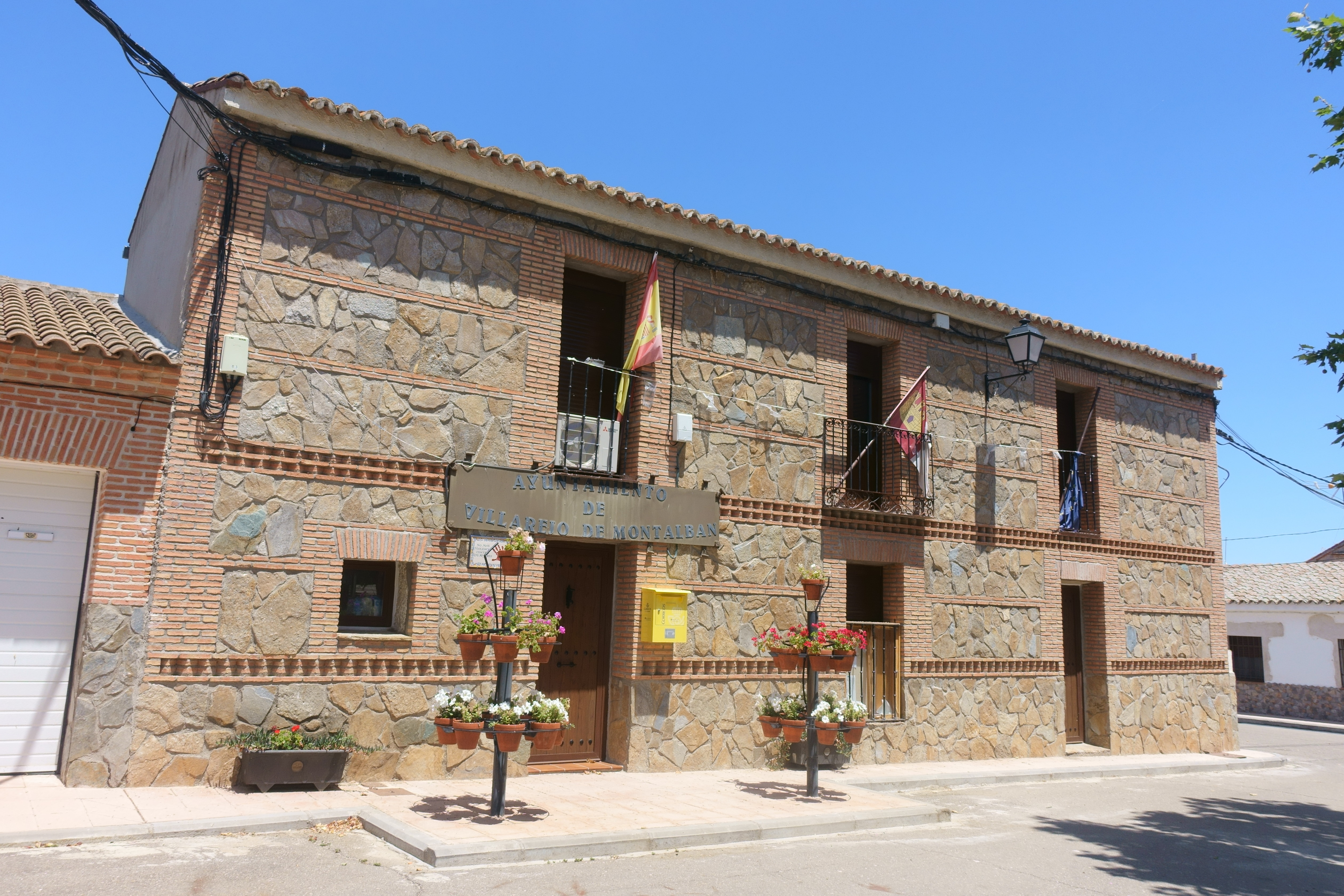
- Town hall

- Location in Spain
- Coordinates: 39°46′N 4°34′W
- Country: Spain
- Autonomous community: Castile-La Mancha
- Province: Toledo
- Municipality: Villarejo de Montalbán

Area
  - Total: 65 km^{2} (25 sq mi)
- Elevation: 538 m (1,765 ft)

Population (2025-01-01)
  - Total: 83
  - Density: 1.3/km^{2} (3.3/sq mi)
- Time zone: UTC+1 (CET)
  - Summer (DST): UTC+2 (CEST)

Villarejo de Montalbán is a municipality located in the province of Toledo, Castile-La Mancha, Spain. According to the 2006 census (INE), the municipality had a population of 76 inhabitants.
