= Untitled (publication) =

Untitled was a serial publication published by the Friends of Photography from 1972 to 1994. A total of 58 numbered publications were issued, first as a small magazine format and later as a series of booklets and full-size books. Numbers 1–10 displayed the series name and issue number on the cover, but as the publications became more specialized each number was titled independently in addition to the series name. The smallest publication in the series was Number 1, with 10 pages, and the largest was Number 43, with 156 pages.

Many of the publications were catalogs of exhibitions held at the Friends of Photography gallery in Carmel, California. The publication featured many famous photographers, including Ansel Adams, Ruth Bernhard, Harry Callahan, Roy DeCarava, Lee Friedlander, Mary Ellen Mark, Aaron Siskind, Paul Strand, Brett Weston, and Edward Weston. It also offered perspectives on newer photographic trends like plastic cameras and the influence of pop art.

List of publications of Untitled
No.	Title	Author	Year	ISBN
1	Untitled #1: Edward Weston	Dody W. Thompson	1972	
2/3	Untitled 2 & 3	Fred R. Parker, editor	1973	
4	Anthony Hernandez and Joseph Jachna	Fred R. Parker, editor	1973	
5	Four Exhibitions: André Kertész, Robert Rauschenberg, Robert Heinecken and Wynn Bullock	Peter Thompson, editor	1973	
6	Untitled 6	Cheryl Douglas, editor	1973	
7/8	On Change and Exchange	Peter Thompson, editor	1974	
9	In Time	Peter Thompson, editor	1975	
10	Nancy Newhall 1908/1974	Beaumont Newhall & Peter Thompson, editors	1976	
11	Emerging Los Angeles Photographers	Rodney C. Stewart	1977	
12	Albert Renger-Patzsch 1987–1966: Photographs from the Collection of the Friends of Photography	James Enyeart, editor	1977	
13	Plants: Photographs by Don Worth	James Enyeart	1977	
14	Untitled 14	James Alinder, editor	1978	
15	Jerome Liebling: Photographs 1947–1977	Estelle Jussim	1978	
16	Ansel Adams: 50 Years of Portraits	James Alinder	1978	
17	Comparative Photography: A Century of Change in Egypt and Israel – Francis Frith and Jane Reese Williams	Brian M. Fagan	1979	0-933286-08-2
18	Robert Cumming	James Alinder	1979	0-933286-09-0
19	Vilem Kriz	David Featherstone	1979	0-933286-10-4
20	Collecting Light: The Photographs of Ruth Bernhard	James Alinder	1979	0-933286-11-2
21	The Diana Show: Pictures Through a Plastic Lens	David Featherstone	1980	0-933286-17-1
22	Images from Within: The Photographs of Edmond Teske	James Alinder	1980	978-0933286184
23	9 Critics / 9 Photographs	James Alinder	1980	0-933286-21-X
24	New Landscapes	Mark Johnstone	1988	0-933286-22-8
25	Discovery and Recognition	James Alinder	1981	0-933286-24-4
26	Altered Landscapes: The Photographs of John Pfahl	Peter C. Bunnell	1981	0-933286-23-6
27	Roy DeCarava	James Alinder	1981	0-933286-27-9
28	Postures: The Studio Photographs of Marsha Burns	David Featherstone	1982	0-933286-25-2
29	Wright Morris: Photographs and Words	James Alinder	1982	0-933286-31-7
30	The Contact Print 1946–1982	James Alinder	1982	0-933286-32-5
31	Nicholas Nixon: Photographs from One Year	James Alinder	1983	0-933286-33-3
32	Mario Giacomelli	Stephen Brigidi and Claire V. C. Peeps	1983	0-933286-34-1
33	Samuel Bourne: Images of India	Arthur Ollman	1983	0-933286-36-8
34	Marion Post Wolcott: FSA Photographs	Sally Stein	1983	0-933286-38-4
35	Observations: Essays on Documentary Photography	David Featherstone, editor	1984	0-933286-39-2
36	Harry Callahan: Eleanor	Anne Kennedy and Nicholas Callaway, editors	1984	0-935112-11-1
37	Ansel Adams: 1902–1984	James Alinder, editor	1984	0-933286-41-4
38	Todd Walker	Julia K. Nelson	1985	0-933286-42-2
39	Mary Ellen Mark: Photographs of Mother Teresa's Missions of Charity in India	David Featherstone	1985	0-933286-43-0
40	Don Worth: Photographs 1955–1985	Hal Fischer	1986	0-933286-44-9
41	EW 100: Centennial Essays in Honor of Edward Weston	Peter C. Bunnell and David Featherstone, editors	1986	9-780933-286-45-0
42	Eikoh Hosoe	Ronald J. Hill	1986	0-933286-46-5
43	Light Years: The Friends of Photography 1967–1987	James Alinder, editor	1987	0-933286-48-1
44	Olivia Parker: Weighing the Planets	Olivia Parker	1987	0-933286-49-X
45	Judith Golden: Cycles, A Decade of Photographs	David Featherstone	1988	0-933286-47-3
46	Frank Gohlke: Landscapes from the Middle of the World. Photographs 1972–1987	Ben Lifson	1988	0-933286-50-3
47	Michael Kenna: Night Walk	Jerome Tarshis	1988	0-933286-51-1
48	Close to Home: Seven Documentary Photographers	David Featherstone	1989	0-933286-52-X
49	Aaron Siskind: Road Trip, Photographs 1980–1988	Charles Traub	1989	0-933286-53-8
50	Holly Roberts	David Featherstone	1989	0-933286-54-6
51	Of Time & Place: Walker Evans & William Christenberry	Thomas W. Southall	1990	0-933286-56-2
52	Toward a Truer Life – Photographs of China 1980–1990 by Reagan Louie	Jonathan Spence	1991	0-89381-477-6
53	Zeke Berman: Optiks	Debra Heimerdinger	1991	0-933286-59-7
54	Lorna Simpson	Deborah Willis	1992	0-933286-60-0
55	Ansel Adams: New Light – Essays on His Legacy and Legend	Michael Read, editor	1993	0-933286-61-9
56	Special Collections: The Photographic Order from Pop to Now	Charles Stainback	1992	0-933286-62-7
57	Ancestral Dialogues: The Photographs of Albert Chong	Quincy Troupe	1994	0-933286-63-5
58	American Prospects: Photographs by Joel Sternfeld	Andy Grundberg and Anne W. Tucker	1994	0-933286-65-1
