= Chris Enos =

American photographer (born 1944)

- Born: Christine Enos; August 21, 1944 (age 81); Burbank, California, U.S.
- Education: Foothill College (AA), San Francisco State University (BA), San Francisco Art Institute (MFA), Universidad de las Américas, A.C.
- Occupations: Photographer, educator
- Website: www.chrisenos.com

Chris Enos (née Christine Enos; born 1944) is an American photographer and educator. She is known for her photography of still life and nudes. Enos has lived in California, Massachusetts, and New Mexico.

== Life and career ==
Chris Enos was born on August 21, 1944, in Burbank, California. She attended Foothill College (AA degree, 1965) in Los Altos Hills, California; San Francisco State University (BA degree in sculpture, 1969); the Universidad de las Américas, A.C. (1967) in Mexico City; and the San Francisco Art Institute (MFA degree, 1971).

Her earliest photographs were of the nudes, and her first camera was a borrowed Nikon. She later shifted her focus to still life and documentary photography. By 1971, she was using a Graflex camera. In 1976, Enos co-founded of the Photographic Resource Center (PRC), a nonprofit organization in Boston, Massachusetts. She served as the director of PRC from 1976 to 1981. Enos is an associate professor emeritus at University of New Hampshire.

Her photography work is in museum collections, including at the High Museum of Art in Atlanta; the Philadelphia Museum of Art; the University of Texas at Austin; and the Harvard Art Museums in Massachusetts.

== Exhibitions ==
- 1985, The Big Picture, University Art Gallery, Cleveland State University, Cleveland, Ohio; including artists Chris Enos, Sandi Fellman, Jerry Burchard, Patrick Nagatani, Barbara Kasten, Rosamond Purcell, Lucas Samaras, William Wegman, Robert Heinecken, Marsha Burns, Jack Welpott, Suda House, Luciano Franchi de Alfaro III, Frank Gillette, Olivia Parker, Vicki Lee Ragan, John Reuter, John Gutkowski, and Judith Golden
