= Jerry Burchard =

American photographer (1931–2011)

- Born: Gerald Burchard; December 1, 1931; Rochester, New York, U.S.
- Died: May 17, 2011 (aged 79); San Francisco, California, U.S.
- Education: California School of Fine Arts
- Occupations: Photographer, educator, curator

Gerald "Jerry" Burchard (December 1, 1931 – May 17, 2011) was an American photographer, educator, and curator. He was a professor emeritus at San Francisco Art Institute.

== Life and career ==
Gerald "Jerry" Burchard was born on December 1, 1931, in Rochester, New York. From 1950 to 1952, he worked for Kodak, the photographic and film company. Burchard was enlisted in the United States Navy from 1952 to 1956, as a photographers mate and during this time he did photography for NATO in Naples, Italy. His photo work was influenced by photojournalist Dorothea Lang.

He attended the California School of Fine Arts (later part of San Francisco Art Institute) from 1956 to 1960, in order to study under Lang. While a student and documenting the era, Burchard took many portraits of San Francisco artists in the Rat Bastard Protective Association (RBPA), such as Bruce Conner, Joan Brown, Jay DeFeo, Carlos Villa, Wally Hedrick, Manuel Neri, and Art Grant.

In 1961, his photograph was removed from the Boston Arts Festival at the American Legion, for 'insulting' the American flag. Burchard started teaching at the San Francisco Art Institute in 1966, and by 1969 he was the chair of the undergraduate photo department.

== Collections ==
Burchard's work can be found in museum collections, including at the Smithsonian American Art Museum in Washington, D.C.; the Art Institute of Chicago; the Norton Simon Museum in Pasadena, California; Minneapolis Institute of Arts in Minneapolis; the Frances Lehman Loeb Art Center at Vassar College in Poughkeepsie, New York; Princeton Art Museum in New Jersey; the Metropolitan Museum of Art in New York City; the Stanford University Libraries; and San Francisco Museum of Modern Art.

== Exhibitions ==
- 1985 – The Big Picture, University Art Gallery, Cleveland State University, Cleveland, Ohio; including artists Jerry Burchard, Patrick Nagatani, Chris Enos, Sandi Fellman, Barbara Kasten, Rosamond Purcell, Lucas Samaras, William Wegman, Robert Heinecken, Marsha Burns, Jack Welpott, Suda House, Luciano Franchi de Alfaro III, Frank Gillette, Olivia Parker, Vicki Lee Ragan, John Reuter, John Gutkowski, and Judith Golden
