= Patrick Nagatani =

American photographer (1945–2017)

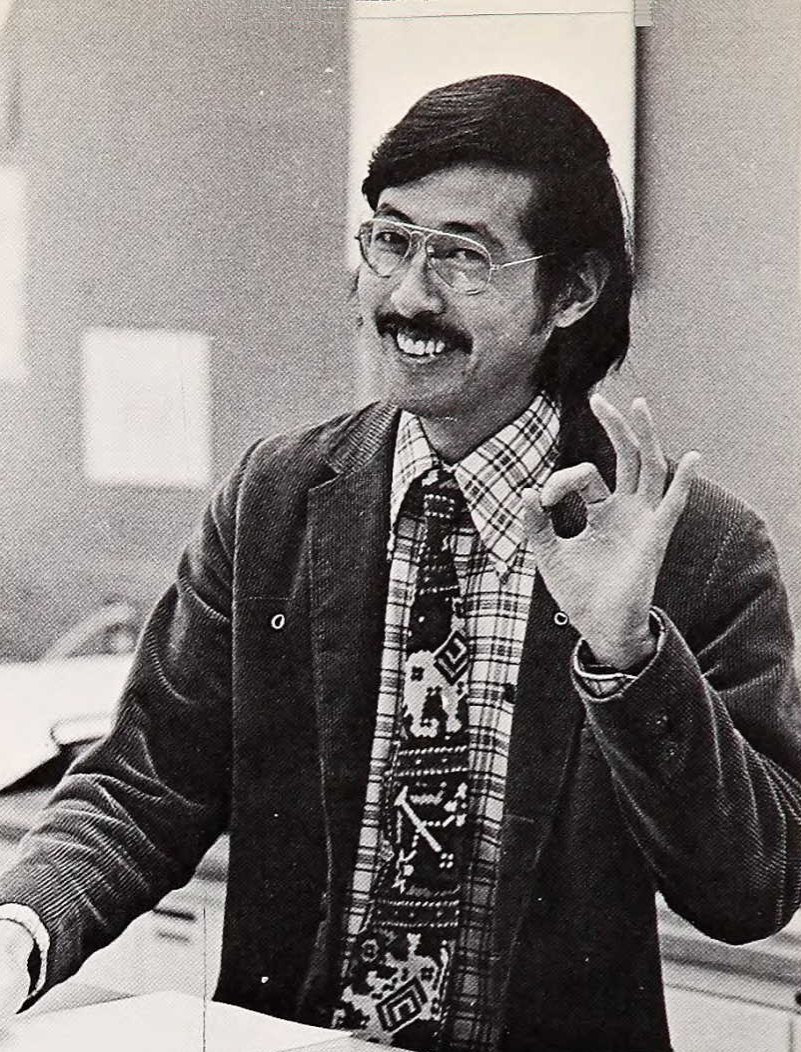
- Nagatani teaching in 1974
- Born: Patrick Ryoichi Nagatani; August 19, 1945; Chicago, Illinois, U.S.
- Died: October 27, 2017 (aged 72); Albuquerque, New Mexico, U.S.
- Education: Cal State L.A. (B.A., 1968); UCLA (M.F.A., 1980)
- Known for: Social documentary photography
- Notable work: Gila River, Butte Camp, Japanese-American Concentration Camp, Arizona, March 25, 1995 / GRB-1-18-11
- Spouse: Leigh Anne Langwell
- Website: www.patricknagatani.com

Patrick Nagatani (August 19, 1945 – October 27, 2017) was an American photographer and educator, best known for his work relating to the unique history of Japanese Americans including their experience with internment camps.

== Biography ==
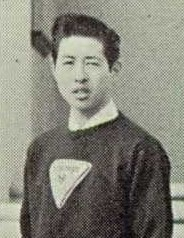
Nagatani at Dorsey in 1962

Patrick Nagatani was born on August 19, 1945, in Chicago, just ten days after the atomic blast on Nagasaki. A Sansei, he was the eldest son of John Shuzo and Diane Yoshiye Nagatani. In 1955, the Nagatanis moved to Los Angeles, where they settled in the Crenshaw District, which at one time had the largest concentration of Japanese-Americans in the country.

In Los Angeles, Nagatani attended Coliseum Street School, Audubon Jr. High School, and Dorsey High School. At Dorsey, he was an honor student, ran hurdles, and was an officer in student government. It wasn't until he started college at Cal State L.A. that he discovered his passion for the arts.

Prior to pursuing a MFA degree, Nagatani taught for the Los Angeles Unified School District at Hamilton High School. He received a MFA degree at the University of California, Los Angeles (UCLA).

Later, he taught at Loyola Marymount University and at the University of New Mexico where he worked with such students as Myra Greene, and Carla Williams.

In the 1980s, Nagatani collaborated on artwork with painter Andree Tracey. Nagatani's artwork have been exhibited internationally and have been featured in numerous publications and films.

Nagatani died on October 27, 2017, at his home in Albuquerque.

== Exhibitions ==
=== Solo exhibitions ===
- 1976 – Pal Gallery, Evergreen State University, Olympia, Washington
- 1982 – Chromo-Therapy Series, Canon Photo Gallery, Amsterdam, the Netherlands
- 1991 – Nuclear Enchantment, Jayne H. Baum Gallery, New York City,
- 2005 – Chromatherapy, Vermont Center for Photography, Brattleboro, Vermont,
- 2007– Chromatherapy, Jan Weiner Gallery, Kansas City, Missouri
- 2010– Desire for Magic: Patrick Nagatani 1978–2008, University of New Mexico, Albuquerque, New Mexico
- 2011 – Desire for Magic: Patrick Nagatani 1978–2008, Japanese American National Museum, Los Angeles, California
- 2012 – Desire for Magic: Patrick Nagatani 1978–2008, Clay Center for the Arts and Sciences, Charleston, West Virginia
- 2018 – Proof: The Ryoichi Excavations, University of Michigan Museum of Art

=== Group exhibitions ===
- 1976 – 1976 Member's Exhibition, Friends of Photography, Carmel, California
- 1983 – The Big Picture, curated by Barbara Hitchcock and Arthur Ollman, Museum of Photographic Arts, San Diego, California
- 1985 – The Big Picture, University Art Gallery, Cleveland State University, Cleveland, Ohio; including artists Patrick Nagatani, Chris Enos, Sandi Fellman, Barbara Kasten, Rosamond Purcell, Lucas Samaras, William Wegman, Robert Heinecken, Marsha Burns, Jack Welpott, Jerry Burchard, Suda House, Luciano Franchi de Alfaro III, Frank Gillette, Olivia Parker, Vicki Lee Ragan, John Reuter, John Gutkowski, and Judith Golden
- 1993 – Schneider-Bluhm-Loeb Gallery, Chicago, Illinois (four artists)
- 2003 – Bridge: Photographs by Robert Clarke-Davis, Jocelyn Nevel, and Patrick Nagatani, Adrian College, Adrian, Michigan
- 2013 – Private Universes / Personal Spaces, SCA Contemporary Art, Albuquerque, New Mexico (six artists)
- 2026 – Reclaiming the Future: The Legacy of Japanese American incarceration, Vladem Contemporary Museum of New Mexico(ten artists)
