= Sandi Fellman =

American artist (born 1952)

- Born: 1952 (age 73–74); Detroit, Michigan, U.S.
- Education: Sir John Cass College of Fine Arts (BS), University of Wisconsin–Madison (MFA)
- Occupations: Photographer, educator, ceramicist
- Website: sandifellman.com

Sandi Fellman (born 1952) is an American commercial and fine art photographer, and educator. Fellman is known for her still life and fashion photography, and she lives in New York City. She also has worked as a ceramicist.

== Life and career ==
Sandi Fellman was born in 1952, in Detroit, Michigan. She graduated with a Bachelor of Science degree in 1972 from Sir John Cass College of Fine Arts in London (now the School of Art, Architecture and Design at London Metropolitan University); and with a Master of Fine Arts degree in 1976 the University of Wisconsin–Madison.

Fellman is known for her large format photographs with textural qualities. Her still life photography has featured up-close images of butterfly wings, and plants.

In the 1980s, Fellman travelled to Japan to photograph tattoos of the yakuza of Tokyo and Osaka with Irezumi, which culminated in to a book and traveling exhibition. She authored, The Japanese Tattoo (Abbeville Press, 1986) with an introduction by D. M. Thomas, which has been printed in many editions.

== Collections ==
Fellman's work is in museum collections, including at the International Center of Photography in New York City; the Museum of Modern Art in New York City; the Museum of Fine Arts, Houston; the Dayton Art Institute in Dayton, Ohio; and the Buffalo AKG Art Museum in Buffalo, New York.

== Exhibitions ==
=== Solo exhibition ===
- 1985, Sandi Fellman, The Witkin Gallery, 415 West Broadway, New York City, New York
- 1994, Sandi Fellman: Art of the Japanese Tattoo, solo exhibition, Southeast Museum of Photography, Daytona Beach Community College, Daytona Beach, Florida
- 1995, Sandi Fellman: Art of the Japanese Tattoo, solo exhibition, Broward County Library, Florida
- 1998, Sandi Fellman, Edwynn Houk Gallery, 745 Fifth Avenue, New York City, New York
- 2002, Sandi Fellman: Sometimes With Shadows, Edwynn Houk Gallery, 745 Fifth Avenue, New York City, New York
- 2013, Photographs and Ceramics by Sandi Fellman, KMR Arts, Washington, Connecticut

=== Group exhibition ===
- 1985, The Big Picture, University Art Gallery, Cleveland State University, Cleveland, Ohio; including artists Sandi Fellman, Jerry Burchard, Patrick Nagatani, Chris Enos, Barbara Kasten, Rosamond Purcell, Lucas Samaras, William Wegman, Robert Heinecken, Marsha Burns, Jack Welpott, Suda House, Luciano Franchi de Alfaro III, Frank Gillette, Olivia Parker, Vicki Lee Ragan, John Reuter, John Gutkowski, and Judith Golden
- 1986, The Art of the Japanese Tattoo: The Collection of Mitsuaki Ohwada, Peabody Museum of Salem, Salem, Massachusetts; curated by John E. Thayer and including artists Sandi Fellman, Utagawa Kuniyoshi, Hokusai, Tsukioka Yoshitoshi, and Toyohara Chikanobu
- 1999, Body Art: Marks of Identity, American Museum of Natural History, New York City, New York; including artists Sandi Fellman, George Burchett, Bettina WitteVeen, and John Bulwer

== Publications ==
- Fellman, Sandi (1975). Scarlett and Other Women. Exposure Press Production.
- Fellman, Sandi (1976). Trick Or Treat: A Sequences of Photographs. Exposure Press Production.
- Fellman, Sandi (1982). Sandi Fellman.
- Fellman, Sandi (1984). Polaroid Photographs (exhibition catalogue). Newcastle, N.S.W.: Newcastle Region Art Gallery. ISBN 978-0-909115-24-1.
- Fellman, Sandi (1986). The Japanese Tattoo. New York City, New York: Abbeville Press. ISBN 9780896597983.
- Hausman, Bonnie; Fellman, Sandi (1999). A to Z Do You Ever Feel Like Me?. New York City, New York: Dutton Children's Books Penguin Putnam. ISBN 9780525462163.
- Fellman, Sandi; Ackerman, Diane (1999). Sandi Fellman: Open Secret. Edition Stemmle. ISBN 978-3-908163-01-5.
