= James L. Enyeart =

American curator

James Lyle Enyeart (born January 13, 1943, in Auburn, Washington; died November 28, 2025, in Santa Fe, New Mexico) was an American photographer, scholar and museum director.

== Career ==
Enyeart was the sixth director of the George Eastman Museum (then, George Eastman House) from 1989 to 1995. Before that he served as Director of the Center for Creative Photography at the University of Arizona from 1977 to 1989. In the mid-1970s he was Director of the Friends of Photography in Carmel, California and prior to that was Curator of Photography at the Spencer Museum of art at the University of Kansas from 1968 to 1976. He has held different professorships during his lifetime, and was Founding Director of the Anne and John Marion Center for Photographic Arts at the College of Santa Fe (now Santa Fe University of Art and Design) from 1995 to 2002, now Emeritus Anne and John Marion Professor.

== Awards ==
Enyeart received a John Simon Guggenheim Memorial Fellowship and several other awards, including the Josef Sudek Medal from the Czech Republic, the Photographic Society of Japan achievement award, and the Photokina Obelisk, Cologne, Germany.

== Published works ==
His photographs are collected by the George Eastman Museum, the Smithsonian American Art Museum, the Bibliothèque Nationale in Paris, the Center for Creative Photography, Sheldon Memorial Gallery, Kiasato Museum of Photography, Japan, the Irish Museum of Modern Art, and other museums and private collections.

=== Photo books ===
- Kansas Landscape: An Exhibition of Photographs by Jim Enyeart. University of Kansas Museum of Art, Lawrence 1971. Only monograph on Enyeart's photography.
- The Architecture of Saint Joseph : "The Golden Age". Photographs by James Enyeart. 1974.
- The Stained Glass Windows of Saint Joseph. Albrecht Art Museum, Saint Joseph 1976.
- James L. Enyeart (ed.). No Mountains in the Way: Kansas Survey, NEA: Photographs by James Enyeart, Terry Evans, Larry Schwarm. University of Kansas Museum of Art, Lawrence 1975.

=== As editor or writer ===
- James L. Enyeart (ed.). Main Street Studio: An Exhibition of Photographs of Famous Vaudeville Entertainers. Text by Orval Hixon. University of Kansas Museum of Art, Lawrence, Worldwide Books, Boston 1971.
- Drawings by Nine West Coast Painters. Drawings by Elmer Bischoff a. o. University of Kansas, Museum of Art, Lawrence 197?.
- Marion Palfi (ed.). Invisible in America. Foreword by Lee D. Witkin, catalogue by James L. Enyeart. University of Kansas Museum of Art, Lawrence 1973.
- James L. Enyeart (ed.). Kansas Album. Text by James Alinder. Kansas Banker's Association, distributed by Addison House, Danbury 1977. ISBN 0-89169-024-7.
- Bruguière, His Photographs and His Life. Knopf, New York 1977. ISBN 0-394-40852-7. Monograph on Francis Bruguière.
- Publications of the Center for Creative Photography during his tenure 1977–1989
  - Helen Gee. Photography of the Fifties. Including photographs by Lisette Model, Minor White, Arnold Newman, and others. Foreword by James Enyeart. CCP, Tucson 1980.
  - Sarah J. Moore. Joyce Neimanas. Foreword by James Enyeart. CCP, Tucson 1984.
  - Judy Dater. Twenty Years. Introduction by Enyeart. CCP, University of Arizona Press, Tucson 1986.
  - James Enyeart, Nancy Solomon (eds.). Henry Holmes Smith: Collected Writings 1935–1985. CCP, University of Arizona, Tucson 1986. ISBN 0-938262-10-6.
  - Labyrinths: Essays on Using Archives. Texts by James Enyeart, Amy Stark, David L. Jacobs, Nancy Solomon, and Judith Leckrone. CCP, Tucson 1986.
  - Edward Weston: Color Photography. Essays by Terrence Pitts, Nancy Newhall and Weston. Preface by James Enyeart. CCP, Tucson 1986.
  - Archive #22: The Letters from Tina Modotti to Edward Weston. Text by Amy Stark. Statement by James Enyeart. Center acquisitions compiled by Sharon Alexandra. Additional article by Roger Myers. CCP, Tucson 1986.
  - Archive #24: Ralph Gibson. Director's statement by James Enyeart. Text by Gibson, additional essays by Amy Rule on Sidney Grossman. CCP, Tucson 1987.
  - James Enyeart, Estelle Jussim (eds.). Decade by Decade: A Survey of Twentieth-Century American Photography from the Collections of the Center for Creative Photography. CCP, Tucson University of Arizona. Little, Brown, Boston 1988.
- James L. Enyeart (ed.). Heinecken. Texts by Robert Heinecken, Marvin Bell a. o. Friends of Photography in association with Light Gallery, New York 1980 (Published in Japan as Heinecken: Selected Works, 1966-1986. Gallery Min, Tokyo 1986 [in English and Japanese]).
- George Fiske. Text by Paul Hickman and Terence Pitts. Preface by Beaumont Newhall. Introduction by James Enyeart. Northland Press, 1980.
- Steven Klindt (ed.). Jerry N. Uelsmann: Photographs from 1975–1979. Essay by Jim Enyeart. Chicago Center for Contemporary Photography, Columbia College, Chicago 1980.
- W. Eugene Smith: Master of the Photographic Essay. Edited and with commentary by William S. Johnson. Foreword by James L. Enyeart. Aperture, New York 1981.
- Michael Smith: Landscapes: 1975-1979. Essay by James L. Enyeart. Foreword by Ricardo Viera. Lodima Press, Revere 1981.
- Aaron Siskind. Text by Carl Chiarenza. Foreword by James L. Enyeart. New York Graphic Society, New York 1982.
- "Clouds (1924), Edward Weston, and the Essence of the Object". In: Three Classic American Photographs: Texts and Contexts. Foreword by Aaron Scharf. American Arts Documentation Centre, and University of Exeter, Devon 1982. ISBN 0-85989-124-0.
- Edward Weston's California Landscapes. A New York Graphic Society, Little, Brown, Boston 1984.
- Andreas Feininger: Andreas Feininger Photographer. Text by Andreas Feininger. Foreword by James L. Enyeart. Harry N. Abrams, 1986.
- Judith Golden: Cycles. A Decade of Photographs. Essay by Claire V. C. Peeps. Interview by James L. Enyeart. Friends of Photography, 1988.
- Sheldon Sampler, One Hundred American Photographs. Sheldon Memorial Art Gallery and University of Nebraska, Lincoln 1988.
- Ansel Adams in Color. Photographs and Writings by Ansel Adams. Edited by Harry Callahan. Introduction by James L. Enyeart. Bulfinch Press, 1993.
- Heinz Liesbrock (ed.). Stephen Shore: Photographs 1973-1993. Texts by Liesbrock, J. L. Enyeart, Thomas Weski and Shore, interview between Hilla and Bernd Becher and Heinz Liesbrock. Schirmer/Mosel, Munich 1993.
- Roger R. Bruce (ed.). Seeing the Unseen: Dr. Harold E. Edgerton and the Wonders of Strobe Alley. Introduction by James L. Enyeart, contributions by Douglas Collins and Joyce Bedi. Trust of George Eastman House, distributed by MIT Press, Cambridge (MA) 1994. ISBN 0-262-02387-3.
- A. D. Coleman: Tarnished Silver. After the Photo Boom: Essays on Photography and Related Matters 1979-1989. Introduction by James L. Enyeart. Midmarch Arts Press, 1996.
- Land, Sky, and All That Is Within: Visionary Photographers in the Southwest. Museum of New Mexico Press, Santa Fe 1998. ISBN 0-89013-366-2 (online).
- Stephen Shore: The Nature of Photographs. Foreword by James L. Enyeart. Johns Hopkins University Press, 1998.
- Jim Dine: Color Photographs. Essay by James L. Enyeart. Pace Wildenstein, New York 1999. ISBN 1-878283-88-X.
- Harmony of Reflected Light: The Photographs of Arthur Wesley Dow (Featuring the Collection of Barbara and George Wright). Museum of New Mexico Press, Santa Fe 2001. ISBN 0-89013-384-0.
- The Photographs of Arthur Wesley Dow. Text by James Enyeart. Hirschl & Adler Galleries, New York 2002. ISBN 0-89013-383-2.
- James Enyeart, Greg Glazner (eds.).Photographers, Writers, and the American Scene: Visions of Passage. Museum of Photographic Arts, San Diego, Arena, Santa Fe 2002. ISBN 1-891024-97-3.
- Lee Friedlander. Sticks & Stones. Fraenkel Gallery, San Francisco, distr. by D.A.P., New York 2004. ISBN 1-891024-97-3.
- Dan Budnik. Picturing Artists (1950s–1960s). Knoedler, New York 2007. ISBN 978-0-9789987-1-4.
- Valdir Cruz: O Caminho das Aguas. Text by Emanoel Araújo and James Enyeart. Cosac Naify, São Paulo (Brazil) 2007.
- Gilles Mora (ed.). Bernard Plossu: Retrospective 1963-2006. Text by Alain Sayag, James Enyeart, Roberta Valtorta, and Jean-Christophe Bailly. Les Editions des Deux Terres, Paris 2007.
- Willard Van Dyke. Changing the World Through Photography and Film. University of New Mexico Press, Albuquerque 2008. ISBN 978-0-8263-4552-3.
- Shelby Lee Adams: Salt & Truth. Introduction by James L. Enyeart. Text by Shelby Lee Adams, Catherine Evans. Candela Books, Richmond (VA) 2011.
- Edward Weston: Fiftieth Anniversary Portfolio. Essay by James L. Enyeart. Lodima Press, Revere 2017.
