= Don Gregorio Antón =

American photographer (born 1956)

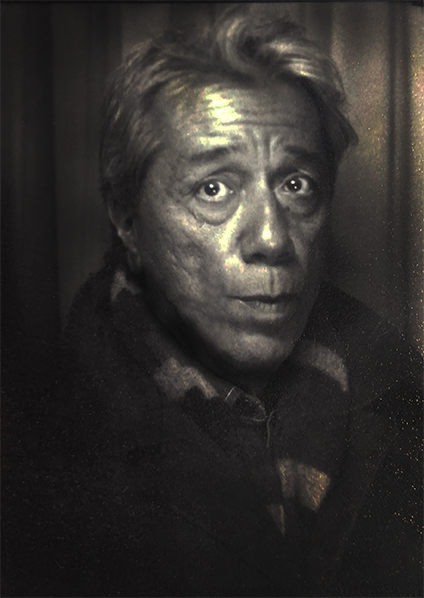
- Born: May 13, 1956 (age 70); East Los Angeles, California
- Education: San Francisco State University (BA, MA)
- Occupation: Artist/Educator
- Website: dongregorioanton.com

Don Gregorio Antón (born May 13, 1956) is a photographer and emeritus professor of art at Cal Poly Humboldt. He lectures at universities and schools about art and photography.

== Early life and studies ==
Antón was born in East Los Angeles and raised in Pico Rivera, California. At 17, his father initially opposed his pursuit of photography, challenging him to prove a Chicano photographer could be successful. Antón's research led him to a book by Mexican photographer Manuel Álvarez Bravo, which convinced his father to support his chosen career.

Antón attended Rio Hondo College before transferring to San Francisco State University where he received his Bachelor of Arts in 1978 and a Master of Arts in 1980. He was mentored by photographers Duane Michals, Eikoh Hosoe, Brett Weston, Robert Heinecken, Edmund Teske, Don Worth, Jack Welpott, and, early in his career, by Dody Weston Thompson.

== Teaching ==
Antón's first teaching assignment was at Otis Art Institute/Parsons School of Design in Los Angeles in 1983. In 1986, he became the Coordinator of Photographic Education through the Department of Extended Education and served as curator of the college's gallery.

In 1987, Tom Knight, the founder of the photography program at Cal Poly Humboldt, recruited Antón for a one-year visiting lecturer position. From 1989 to 1991, Antón served as director of the photography program at Olympic College in Bremerton. After Knight's death, Antón was hired by HSU to fill the position. He retired in 2014.

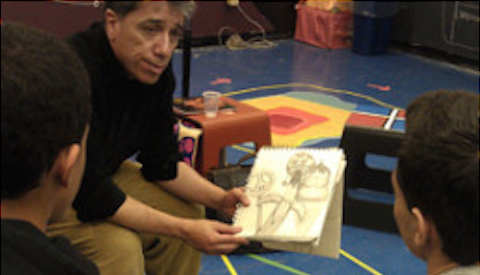
Antón working with students at the Juan Morrel Campos Secondary School, Brooklyn

Antón's contributions to photographic education have been recognized with awards including the Freestyle Crystal Apple Teaching Award from the Society for Photographic Education in 2010 and the Excellence in Photographic Education – Teacher of the Year Award from the Santa Fe Center for Visual Arts in 2002. He has also received recognition from the WESTAF/National Endowment for the Arts, Regional Fellowship for the Visual Arts in 1993.

== Recognition ==
In 1982, Antón's work was included in an exhibition curated by Franciscan Sister Karen at Galería Otra Vez in Boyle Heights, Los Angeles. Antón's work was also included in the first cross-cultural exhibition of photography in Los Angeles. The Multicultural Focus survey was directed by curator and writer Josine Ianco-Starrels and held at the Los Angeles Municipal Art Gallery in Barnsdall Park in 1981 to celebrate the city's Bicentennial. American journalist Suzanne Muchnic called it "The best contemporary show [of photography] of the year". Thirty years later, this exhibition, retitled REFOCUS: Multicultural Focus, was revisited as part of the Getty Museum's survey Pacific Standard Time. This survey was a collaboration of over 60 cultural institutions across Southern California from October 2011 to March 2012, exploring the history of the Los Angeles art scene.

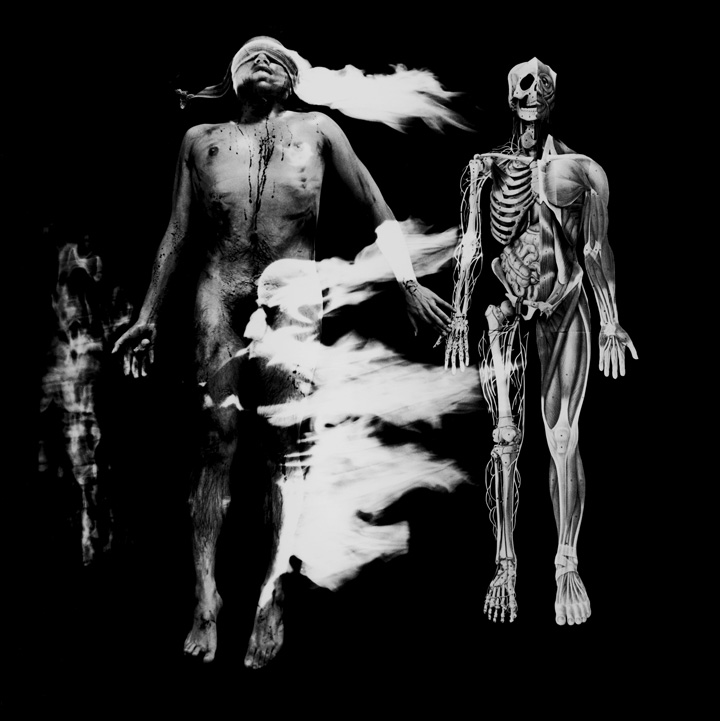
From the exhibition, American Voices: Latino Photography in the U.S., FOTOFEST, Houston

In 2006, Antón's Artist-in-residence at Light Work resulted in the exhibition and catalog Ollin Mecatl: The Measure of Movements, curated and authored by executive director and photographer Hannah Freiser. Katherine Rushworth, Fine Arts Critic and former Director of the Michael C. Rockefeller Arts Center, described it as "One of the most elegant shows of the year". The show included Antón's "Retablos" series, images on copper plates that allude to religious iconography often found in colonial churches. Antón first encountered this style of devotional paintings as an altar boy at Saint Francis Xavier church in Pico Rivera.

In Light Work's Annual Contact Sheet of 2007, poet and photo-historian John Wood wrote, "Don Gregorio Antón's photographs radiate compassion like the work of no other living artist I know. They are filled with an intense humanity we usually find only in a few documentary photographers and photo-journalists—the Smiths, Salgados, and Nachtweys. Antón is, however, a different kind of photographer, though one could call his work a document of the spirit, the journal of a sacred quest. But his photographs are not even photographs in the usual sense of the word—those captured moments of a past reality, be they taken by someone's uncle at a family picnic or by Paul Strand in a French village. His images, though equally real, are constructions of psychological realities, portrayals of mythic fears, sacrifices, and hopes... In the presence of such art we are in the presence of the sacred." In 2010, Aperture exhibited a selection of this work in Mexico & Afuera: Contemporary Mexican and Mexican-American Voices, and Selections from En Foco featuring Chicano, Mexican, and Mexican American photographers.

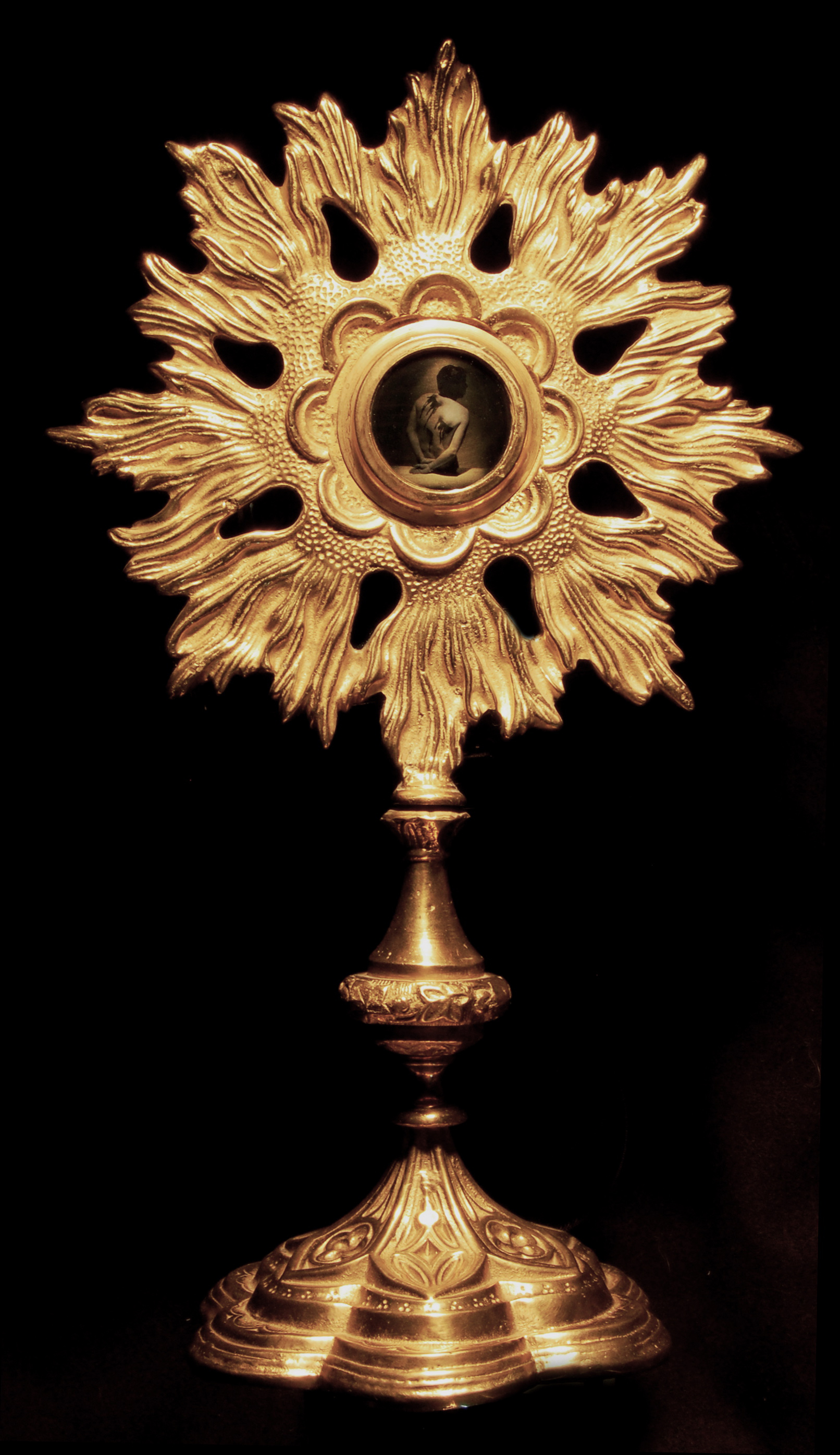
From the exhibition, EN FOCO / New Works - Crossing Boundaries, BRIC Brooklyn

Antón's work was shown in EN FOCO: New Works/Crossing Boundaries, a collaborative exhibition by editor and publisher Miriam Romais and historian and director of BRIC ARTS Elizabeth Ferrer, in 2013. Ferrer wrote of this exhibition in the photographic journal Nueva Luz, "For the series included in the exhibition, Arc of Tragedy, Antón placed photographs into reliquaries, shrine-like objects created to house religious artifacts (or literally, relics) such as the fragment of a saints’s bone or clothing. Antón’s reliquaries display small photographs, often self-portraits depicting some kind of ritual act or moment of ecstasy. There is an otherworldly quality to these images; they are primal and visceral, yet suffused with shadows and never fully comprehensible. The artist’s aim is not to provide fixed meanings or readings, but for the viewer to complete these works, to project their own memories, dreams, or emotions upon the imagery and to continue this unending project of the search for self."

== Writings ==
Antón was awarded the Cesar Chavez Award by the students of M.E.Ch.A. (Movimiento Estudiantil Chicano de Aztlan) of HSU, for their use of his essay, "No Thought is Alone – A Teachers Plea for You to Add Yourself into the Course of Change" in welcoming and retaining incoming students to the university.

In an essay published by the Hispanic Research Center's Latina/o Art Community, Antón asserts, "It is crucial to understand that you must add a part of yourself to all that you see for learning to take place. Learning, not in what you see, but in how you see. Whatever you approach, whatever mysteries there are, all of them will need you as a vital part of their unfolding. So I ask you to be active with your thoughts, challenge your world, refine your seeing as this is a gift you can only give yourself."

"Of Fields and Fissures: Facing Diversity and Leveling the Playing Field" was published in Nueva Luz (Vol.14 No.2), and the accompanying lecture "It Is Not in What You Teach, but Who You Teach" was presented at the 2010 Society of Photographic Education National Conference in Philadelphia.

== Interviews ==
In a Huffington Post conversation titled "Interviewing Don Gregorio Antón About Learning Through The Lens", Ramon Nuez describes Antón's process of seeing: "There is a mysticism in Antón's work. Which calls for a preoccupation of thought. Provoking a different response in every viewer."

Antón was featured on "What Follows", a video series from the University of Colorado, Boulder featuring interviews with artists, critics, and curators who have participated in the Department of Art & Art History's Visiting Artist Program. The series aims to make these individuals accessible to colleges, schools, and museums.

Antón was also highlighted in Blue Mitchell's *Diffusion: Unconventional Photography Vol. 2*. In the Artist Profile entitled "The Rules of Tragedy", Antón states, "To believe in anything is to risk the chance of being misunderstood... If you are willing to give up the weight of failure and judgment in your work, you will allow it freedom to move at its own velocity in its own unique force of description. Then it will have something to teach you, something to make use of what you know."

== Aesthetics ==
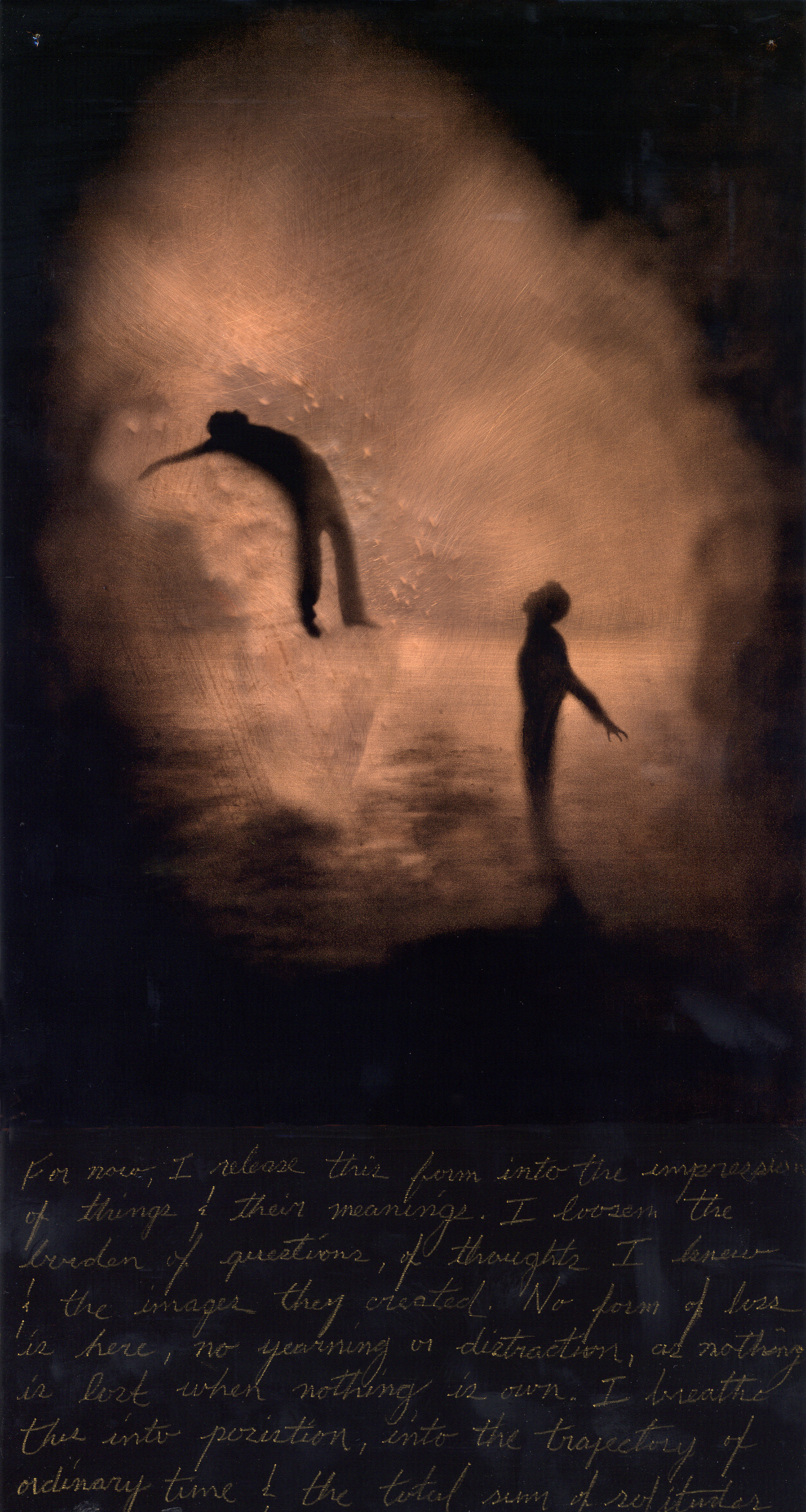
From the exhibition, OLLIN MECATL: The Measure of Movements, Light Work, Syracuse

Essayist Cameron Woodall addresses the nature of empathy in Antón's works, stating, "Using Photography, Don Gregorio Antón searches the depths of consciousness leaving us awed at magic manifested. Charged with spiritual energy, his art is utilized to seek understanding of himself and his world. Through his use of personal myth we find the connection between subjective knowledge and shared emotion. The final pieces are neither questions nor answers but are artifacts of memory and experience."

The photography critic Paul La Rosa describes the emotional underpinnings of the imagery: "To view the widely praised and widely exhibited work of Don Gregorio Antón is to bear witness to an intensely personal vision, immersive and in-the-raw. It seems more compelled than devised, conjuring a world both strange and familiar, enclosed and internal yet reverberating outward. We are riveted by these photographs as we might suddenly catch a stranger in a moment of self-reflection, caressing an exposed limb or talking out loud or shedding a tear alone in public. In times like these, we glimpse ourselves in others, acknowledge common pains and desires and fugitive thoughts. This is the hidden, introspective terrain Antón explores and records, and in which we in turn, halt, and find ourselves reflected."

Hannah Frieser's introduction to "OLLIN MECATL: The Measure of Movements" interprets the works' ancestral construct: "Antón’s work is likely to provoke a different response in every viewer. The retablos can be appreciated for their enigmatic beauty, their haunting narratives, or their intense spirituality. Where we find ourselves in our lives may be where we find ourselves in Antón’s imagery, so it is up to each person to find his or her own way to his world. Antón has tightly woven his cultural identity into this body of work. Through the imagery and text of each retablo he describes and reforges his connectedness to his roots in Mexico. The writing on some retablos is easy to read, while the words on others fade into the background like melodies half remembered. Not unlike diary entries, the writing is deeply personal and vulnerable to exposure. The work describes a mysterious and otherworldly existence that most of us experience only through dreams or nightmares. Linear time does not exist, and raw emotions are laid out in the open. Antón’s world is not defined as pain and suffering, though both appear frequently in the images. Rather suffering, pain, and fear are invited and accepted as players within the timeless cycle of life, along with bliss and salvation."

== Exhibits ==
His works have been exhibited at Aperture in New York; the Royal Photographic Society, Bath, England; Museum of Photographic Arts, San Diego; Nagase Photo Salon, Tokyo and Osaka; El Museo Francisco Oller y Diego Rivera, Buffalo, NY; Friends of Photography, Carmel, CA; Art Museum of the Americas, Washington, DC; Aljira, a Center for Contemporary Art, Newark, NJ; Bronx Museum of the Arts, NY; Sol Mednick Gallery, Philadelphia, PA; Starlight Gallery, Brooklyn, NY; Longwood Art Gallery, Bronx, NY; Arts Visalia Visual Arts Center, Visalia, CA; and at the Getty Museum's "Pacific Standard Time", REFOCUS: Multicultural Focus, and at Santa Monica Art Studios (SMAS) in California.

Antón's work is held in various collections such as the Bibliothèque Nationale, Paris; the San Francisco Museum of Modern Art; the Museum of Fine Arts, Houston; the Smithsonian Institution, Washington DC.; the Consejo Mexicano de Fotografía, Mexico DF; Royal Photographic Society, England; Santa Barbara Museum of Art; the Crocker Art Museum, Sacramento; the Museum of Photographic Arts, San Diego; and the Foto Museo Cuatro Caminos, Edo De Mexico.

No Thought is Alone - A video steming from Antón's belief that the eye is crippled when the mind thinks it has nothing to give.

== Publications ==
- 2020: Latinx Photography in the United States, by Elizabeth Ferrer ISBN 978-0-295-74763-7
- 2008: Contact Sheet, "Don Gregorio Antón – Ollin Mecatl: The Measure of Movements", introduction by Hannah Frieser ISBN 0-935445-56-0
- 2002: Contemporary Chicana and Chicano Art: Artists, Work, Culture, and Education, by Gary D. Keller ISBN 1-931010-22-6
- 2001: "Strange Genius" – The Journal of Contemporary Photography, Volume V, by Leo & Wolfe Photography ISBN 1892733099

== Videos ==
- 2010: No Thought is Alone, YouTube. (Video, 10-minute edited version.)
- 2008: WHAT FOLLOWS, YouTube. (Video, 8:31 minutes.)
- 2006: Light Work – "Spotlight on Photography", Don Gregorio Antón (Video, 8:57 minutes.)
