= Judith Golden =

American photographer (1934–2023)

- Born: Judith Walters Greene; November 29, 1934; Chicago, U.S.
- Died: January 27, 2023 (aged 88); Albuquerque, New Mexico, U.S.
- Education: School of the Art Institute of Chicago (BFA), University of California, Davis (MFA)
- Occupations: Photographer, educator, mixed media artist, book artist, printmaker, painter
- Years active: 1973–2017
- Known for: Conceptual portait photography
- Children: 2
- Awards: NEA Fellow (1979)

Judith Golden (née Judith Walters Greene; November 29, 1934 – January 27, 2023) was an American photographer and educator. She was known for her portraits of women, and her artwork dealt with themes of gender, identity, and media culture. She taught at the University of Arizona in Tucson for many years.

== Life and career ==
Judith Golden was born on November 29, 1934, in Chicago. She was Jewish. Golden graduated with a BFA degree in 1973 from the School of the Art Institute of Chicago, and a MFA degree in 1975 from the University of California, Davis, where she studied under William T. Wiley, Manuel Neri, Roy De Forest, Wayne Thiebaud, and Robert Arneson.

From 1975 to 1979, Golden created a series of self-portraits in black-and-white with collage and hand-colored. Her cycle series from the mid-1980s were photographic portraits of "feral" children and adults blended into their environment. Her work in the retrospective traveling exhibition, Judith Golden: Myths and Masquerades (1986–1987), was focused on photographic self portraits in meticulously observed character roles.

Golden taught photography within the school of art at the University of Arizona, from 1981 until 1996.

She received a National Endowment for the Arts photography's fellowship in 1979; and an Arizona Foundation grant in 1984. She was a member of the Los Angeles Center for Photographic Studies from 1976 to 1979, and served as a trustee from 1977 to 1979.

== Collections ==
Her work is in museum collections, including at the Fogg Museum at Harvard University in Cambridge, Massachusetts; the George Eastman Museum in Rochester, New York; the University of Arizona in Tucson; the Minneapolis Institute of Art; the Art Institute of Chicago; the Los Angeles County Museum of Art (LACMA); the Museum of Contemporary Art, Los Angeles; and the San Francisco Museum of Modern Art (SFMoMA).

== Exhibitions ==
=== Solo exhibitions ===
- 1981 – Judith Golden: Portraits of Women, Quay Gallery, San Francisco, California
- 1985 – Violation: Exhibition on Rape and Violence, Union Gallery, Student Union at the University of Arizona, Tucson, Arizona
- 1986 – Judith Golden: Myths and Masquerades, Museum of Photographic Arts, Balboa Park, San Diego, California
- 1987 – Judith Golden: Photography, 1972–1987, Tucson Museum of Art, Tucson, Arizona
- 1987 – Judith Golden: Myths and Masquerades, University of New Mexico Art Museum, Albuquerque, New Mexico
- 1996 – Crossings: A Celebration of Judith Golden, Center for Creative Photography Library, University of Arizona, Tucson, Arizona
- 2005 – Judith Golden: Elusive Realities, Temple Gallery, Tucson, Arizona

=== Group exhibitions ===
- 1979 – The Altered Photograph, MoMA PS1, Queens, New York
- 1985 – Phoenix Biennial, Phoenix Art Museum, Phoenix, Arizona; including artists Judith Golden, Roger Asay, Rebecca Davis, Fred Borcherdt, Edward Putzer, Pamela Marks, Tamarra Kaida, Suzanne Klotz–Reilly, R. Edward Lowe, Fox Joy McGrew, Mary Peck, Garrison Roots, Susanne Tilger, Kenji Umeda, Susan Weller, Gregory West, Charles Braendle, and Linda Mundwiler
- 1985 – Women Who Create: An Exhibition of Arizona Artists, group exhibition, Coconino Center for the Arts, Flagstaff, Arizona; including artists Judith Golden, Tamarra Kaida, Lynn Tabor–Borcherdt, Claribel Cone, Victoria Kinshella, and Joy Fox McGrew
- 1985 – The Big Picture, touring group exhibition, University Art Gallery, Cleveland State University, Cleveland, Ohio; including artists Judith Golden, Chris Enos, Sandi Fellman, Barbara Kasten, Rosamond Purcell, Lucas Samaras, William Wegman, Robert Heinecken, Marsha Burns, Jack Welpott, Jerry Burchard, Suda House, Luciano Franchi de Alfaro III, Frank Gillette, Olivia Parker, Vicki Lee Ragan, John Reuter, John Gutkowski, and Patrick Nagatani
- 1988 – University of Arizona Art Faculty Exhibition, University of Arizona Museum of Art, Tucson, Arizona; including artists Judith Golden, Margaret Bailey Doogan, Harold Jones, James Davis, Andrew Polk, Aurore Chabot, Alfred Quiroz, Michael Croft, Andrew Rush, Chuck Hitner, Robert Colescott, and John Heric

== Publications ==
- Golden, Judith; Leonard, Joanne (1981). Photo/trans/forms: Exhibition August 21-October 11, 1981, San Francisco Museum of Modern Art (exhibition catalogue). San Francisco Museum of Modern Art.
- Golden, Judith; Peeps, Claire; Tucson Museum of Art (1987). Judith Golden: Photography, 1972–1987 (exhibition catalogue). Tucson Museum of Art.
- Golden, Judith (1988). Judith Golden: Cycles, a Decade of Photographs. Friends of Photography.
