= Bernis von zur Muehlen =

American photographer (born 1942)

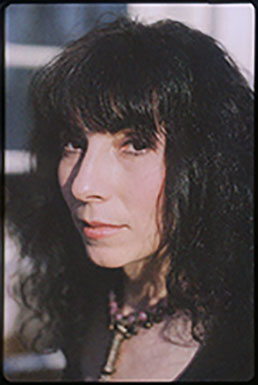
- von zur Muehlen in 1993
- Born: Bernis Susan Neiman; April 10, 1942 (age 84); Philadelphia, Pennsylvania, United States
- Education: University of Pennsylvania (BA, Literature)
- Known for: Photography
- Awards: Phi Beta Kappa 1962
- Website: bernisvonzurmuehlen.com

Bernis von zur Muehlen (born 1942) is an American fine art photographer.

== Early life and education ==
Bernis von zur Muehlen was born in Philadelphia, Pennsylvania in 1942. She received a BA in literature, second in her class, from the University of Pennsylvania in 1963, earning a Phi Beta Kappa in 1962.

She taught English at her alma mater Northeast High School (Philadelphia), where she appeared as the English teacher giving a class on poetry in Fredrick Wiseman's celebrated cinéma vérité 1968 documentary High School.

After moving to Northern Virginia, she began photographing the male nude, turning to other subjects in later years.

She has lived in Northern Virginia since 1968 and is married to economist and photographer Peter von zur Muehlen.

== Career ==
Variously described as "idealistic", creating "a theater of the mind", and playing on "the transience of beauty" and "the ephemeral quality of life", von zur Muehlen's photographs have been displayed in solo and group exhibitions in public as well as commercial spaces in the US and abroad, including New York, London, Edinburgh, Frankfurt, International Art Fair, Bologna, Boston, Washington D.C., and Virginia. Venues include the Corcoran Gallery of Art, the International Center of Photography, the Virginia Museum of Fine Art, the Baltimore Museum of Art, the Delaware Art Museum, SITES, a Smithsonian Institution Traveling Exhibition, and the American University Museum.

In later years, she turned to other concerns, such as Polachrome positive color film images of children's dolls reflecting adolescent sexuality in modern society. A year-long stay in Nepal yielded the 1990 Terra Sancta exhibit at the Corcoran Gallery of Art. A solo exhibit at the National Jewish Museum in Washington, D.Cfeatured photographs of the famed Old Jewish Cemetery in Prague. Images of cremation niches in Prague's Christian Olšany Cemetery were later shown in Washington D.C. and in an exhibit curated by John Szarkowski at the New Orleans Museum of Art. In 2019, her work was included in the American University Museum's exhibition of a selection from the collection of the defunct Corcoran Gallery, "Moves Like Walter". Her most recent solo exhibit, entitled "Nature's Tapestry," took place at the American University Museum.

== Publications ==
=== Monograph ===
- von zur Muehlen, Bernis; von zur Muehlen, Peter. Prague Revisited: From World War II to the Velvet Revolution.

=== Anthologies ===
- Leddick, David, ed. (2008). The Nude Male: 21st Century Visions. Includes photographs by Chuck Close, Lucian Freud, Nan Goldin, David Hockney, Duane Michals, Dianora Niccolini, Arthur Tress, and Bernis von zur Muehlen.
- Cooper, Emmanuel, ed. (2004). Male Bodies: A Photographic History of the Nude. Includes photographs by Thomas Eakins, Eadweard Muybridge, Wilhelm von Gloeden, Eugene Frank, Edward Weston, Imogen Cunningham, Minor White, George Platt Lynes, Duane Michals, Andy Warhol, Bernis von zur Muehlen, Peter Hujar, Nan Goldin, Annie Leibovitz, Arthur Tress, and Dianora Niccolini.
- Leddick, David, ed. (2001). Male Nude Now: Visions for the 21st Century. Includes photographs by Chuck Close, George Dureau, David Hockney, Nan Goldin, Duane Michals, Dianora Niccolini, Arthur Tress, and Bernis von zur Muehlen.
- Weiermair, Peter, ed. (1995). Male Nudes by Women: An Anthology. Includes photographs by Dianora Niccolini, Bernis von zur Muehlen, Karin Rosenthal, Marsha Burns, Suzanne E. Pastor, Irene Peschick, Giuliana Traverso, Charlotte March, Nan Goldin, Sandi Fellman, Barbara DeGenevieve, Lynn Davis, Rosella Bellusci, Maria-Theresia Litschauer, Ernestine Ruben, Dominique Auerbacher, Jacqueline Livingston, and Jaschi Klein.
- Weiermair, Peter, ed. (1988). Frauen Sehen Männer: die Darstellung des männlichen Aktes durch zeitgenössische Fotografinnen. Includes photographs by Dianora Niccolini, Bernis von zur Muehlen, Karin Rosenthal, Marsha Burns, Suzanne E. Pastor, Irene Peschick, Giuliana Traverso, Charlotte March, Nan Goldin, Sandi Fellman, Barbara DeGenevieve, Lynn Davis, Rosella Bellusci, Maria-Theresia Litschauer, Ernestine Ruben, Dominique Auerbacher, Jacqueline Livingston, and Jaschi Klein.
- Barnes, Lawrence, ed. (1980). The Male Nude in Photography. Includes photographs by Imogen Cunningham, Edward Weston, Minor White, George Platt Lynes, Wolfgang von Wangenheim, Dianora Niccolini, Sally Mann, Lynn Davis, Eva Rubinstein, Karen Tweedy-Holmes, Robert Mapplethorpe, Linda White, Joyce Tenneson Cohen, Rosamund W. Purcell, Bernis von zur Muehlen, and Jacqueline Livingston.
- Scully, Julia, ed. (1979). Family of Woman. Includes photographs by Walker Evans, André Kertész, Leonard Freed, Garry Winogrand, Bruce Davidson, Eugene Richards, Eve Arnold, Abigail Heyman, Bernis von zur Muehlen, Dorothea Lange, Alex Webb, Charles Harbutt, Leni Riefenstahl, Frances McLaughlin-Gill, Mario Giacomelli, Marc Riboud, Arthur Tress, Bill Owens, Mary Ellen Mark, Mike Disfarmer, Bob Willoughby, Judy Dater, and Elliott Erwitt.
- Gibson, Ralph, ed. (1979). SX-70 Art. Includes photographs by Frank DiPerna, Stephen Shore, Helmut Newton, Walker Evans, Hans Namuth, Chris von Wangenheim, Jane Tuckerman, Mary Ellen Mark, Gene Davis, Christian Vogt, André Kertész, Ralph Gibson, Richard Pare, Bernis von zur Muehlen, Lucas Samaras, Andy Warhol, Neil Slavin, and Duane Michals.
- Sandler, Martin, ed. (1979). The Story of American Photography: An Illustrated History for Young People. Includes photographs by Mathew Brady, Eadweard Muybridge, Thomas Eakins, Clarence White, Alfred Stieglitz, Paul Strand, Edward Steichen, Edward Weston, Jacob Riis, Lewis Hine, Edward S. Curtis, Arnold Genthe, James Van Der Zee, Walker Evans, Dorothea Lange, Arthur Tress, Ernst Haas, W. Eugene Smith, Robert Capa, Margaret Bourke-White, David Douglas Duncan, Alfred Eisenstaedt, Irving Penn, Ansel Adams, Minor White, Paul Caponigro, Harry Callahan, Aaron Siskind, Lee Friedlander, Geoff Winningham, Diane Arbus, and Bernis von zur Muehlen.
- Tenneson Cohen, Joyce, ed. (1988). In/Sights: Self Portraits by Women. Includes photographs by Joyce Tenneson, Gillian Brown, Mary Beth Edelson, Sandi Fellman, Jacqueline Livingston, and Bernis von zur Muehlen.
- Kalmus, Yvonne; Ripp, Rikki; Wiesenfeld, Cheryl, eds. (1977). Women See Men. Includes photographs by Dianora Niccolini, Bernis von zur Muehlen, Starr Ockenga, Barbara Morgan, Naomi Savage, Carol Wald, and Sylvia Plachy.
- Hayes, Dannielle B., ed. (1977). Women Photograph Men. Includes photographs by Kathryn Abbe, Arlene Alda, Mary Ellen Andrews, Fran Antmann, Barbara Astman, Jeannie Baubion-Mackler, Eileen Kaye Berger, Carolee Campbell, Bobbi Carrey, Patricia Carroll, Diana Mara Henry, Mary Ellen Mark, Ann Mandelbaum, Barbara Morgan, Marjorie Neikrug, Dianora Niccolini, Suzanne Opton, Eva Rubinstein, Nina Howell Starr, Martha Swope, Sherry Suis, Suzanne Szasz, Judith Turner, Bernis von zur Muehlen, and Helena Chapellin Wilson.

=== Catalogues ===
- Invisible Light. Smithsonian Institution Traveling Exhibition Service.
- Sacred Silences: Photographs of Jewish Prague. National Jewish Museum.
- Terra Sancta: Photographs from Israel and Sinai, Nepal, and the North American Deserts. Corcoran Gallery.
- Moves Like Walter: New Curators Open the Corcoran Legacy Collection. American University Museum.
- Nature's Tapestry. American University Museum.

== Collections ==
- American University Museum at the Katzen
- Center for Creative Photography, University of Arizona Museum of Art
- Baltimore Museum of Art
- The Museum of Fine Arts Houston
- New Orleans Museum of Art
- Wesleyan University Davison Center
- The Polaroid Collection
