= Eileen Cowin =

American artist and photographer

- Born: 1947 (age 78–79); Brooklyn, New York, US
- Education: IIT Institute of Design, State University of New York New Paltz
- Known for: Photography, Video, Installation art, Conceptual art
- Spouse: Jay Brecker
- Awards: National Endowment for the Arts, California Community Foundation, Public Art Fund, Sundance Film Festival
- Website: eileencowin.com

Eileen Cowin, One Night Stand (clock/flowers), Photograph, 20" x 24", 1977–8. Los Angeles County Museum collection.

Eileen Cowin (born 1947) is a Los Angeles–based artist known for photography, video and mixed-media installations that draw on the language of mass media and art history to explore the relationships between narrative, fiction and non-fiction, memory and experience. Associated with the 1970s Los Angeles experimental photography scene and the Pictures Generation artists, her work combines familiar human situations and carefully chosen gestures, expressions and props in enigmatic images whose implied, open-ended stories viewers must complete. New York Times critic Andy Grundberg wrote that her multi-image work "sets up a tension between the familiar and the mysterious, creating a climate of implied danger, sexual intrigue and violence" in which clues abound to intimate various narratives. In a review of Cowin's 2026 retrospective at the Los Angeles County Museum of Art (LACMA), Leah Ollman wrote, "Cowin is a wry disruptor. She has spoken of her interest in lying and duplicity, and has consistently, fruitfully, positioned her work on the border of fiction and nonfiction … [She] may appear as the subject in her photographs, but she is primarily the narrator, an intriguingly unreliable narrator who recognizes the inevitability of multiple, simultaneous truths."

In addition to LACMA, Cowin has exhibited at the Museum of Contemporary Art, Los Angeles (MoCA), J. Paul Getty Museum, Museum of Contemporary Photography and Contemporary Arts Center, among other venues. Her work is included in more than forty institutional collections, including LACMA, the Getty Museum, Brooklyn Museum, Art Institute of Chicago, San Francisco Museum of Modern Art (SFMOMA), and Smithsonian American Art Museum. She has received awards and commissions from the National Endowment for the Arts, LACMA, the City of Los Angeles (COLA), Public Art Fund (New York), and the Sundance and USA film festivals. Cowin is based in Santa Monica, California with her spouse, poet Jay Brecker.

== Life and career ==
Cowin was born in Brooklyn, New York and attended State University of New York at New Paltz (BS, 1968), where artist and professor Robert Schuler was a key influence. She continued her studies at IIT Institute of Design in Chicago, (MS, Photography, 1970) with modernist photographers Aaron Siskind and Arthur Siegel . Cowin exhibited during and just after graduate school, including group shows at the Museum of Modern Art, Philadelphia Museum of Art and Fogg Museum, and a solo exhibition at the Witkin Gallery in New York (1972). From 1971–1975, she taught photography at Franconia College in New Hampshire, before becoming a professor at California State University, Fullerton in 1975, where she taught until retiring in 2008.

Cowin's work quickly became associated with key postmodern and feminist currents, drawing attention on both coasts. She had notable solo exhibitions at LACMA (1985), Museum of Contemporary Photography (1991), Cleveland Museum of Art (1998), a traveling retrospective at the Amory Center for the Arts and Contemporary Arts Center in Cincinnati (2000), and gallery shows at OK Harris and Jayne H. Baum (New York City) and Roy Boyd Gallery (Santa Monica), among others. In 2024, the California Museum of Photography featured Cowin in a collaborative exhibition with the artist Jonesy, and in 2026, LACMA mounted a retrospective of Cowin's work, "Between Panic and Paradise." Her work was also included in the Whitney Biennial (1983), the traveling exhibitions "Photography in California, 1945 – 1980" (SFMOMA, 1984–1986) and "Defining Eye: Women Photographers of the Twentieth Century" (Saint Louis Art Museum, 1997), the three-person exhibition, "Narrative Interventions in Photography" (Getty Museum, 2011), and the survey, "Under the Big Black Sun: California Art 1974-1981" (MoCA, 2011).

Eileen Cowin, Family Docudrama, Photograph, 20" x 24", 1980–3. J. Paul Getty Museum collection.

== Work ==
Cowin's work has been associated with two emerging movements of the 1970s: the Los Angeles experimental photography scene (which also included John Divola, Robert Heinecken and Darryl Curran) and the East Coast Pictures Generation artists. Cowin, and others such as James Casebere, Cindy Sherman, Laurie Simmons and Jeff Wall, challenged the realist, documentary aesthetic of preceding photographers with explicitly fabricated images that partook in artifice and the boundlessness associated with painting and cinema; critics suggest their work influenced the later generation of mise-en-scène photographers. While exploring media and formats from staged tableaux to multi-image, multimedia installations, Cowin's work retains a strategic and thematic consistency, combining objects, gestures, expressions, words and visual referents whose charged associations probe romantic, familial and social relationships, and themes involving public and private, truth and fiction, and the gulf between representation, the inexpressible and interpretation.

=== Early work: 1969–1979 ===
In her early career, Cowin pushed against photographic conventions, incorporating appropriated imagery and unusual techniques into her images. She frequently layered transparencies of her own photographs—often of domestic subjects—with war and news images from magazines or sewed seemingly unrelated images onto print surfaces, reflecting feminist concerns. Her gum bichromate prints (1972–1975) featured pale, washed-out colors that played against sensual, erotic imagery evoking the sexual liberation of the era; she multiplied the perspectives and readings of each work with layered personal symbols, cultural motifs and sewn elements.

Her One Night Stand suite (1977-1979) anticipated the conceptual and narrative concerns, formal rigor and emotional depth of her mature work. Shot in the flat, unaffected tones and color of the day's minimalist and non-theatrical aesthetic, these playfully sparse compositions offered fragmented clues intimating a sexual tryst: Polaroid snapshots of people disrobing tucked behind phone cords and alarm clocks, rumpled sheets, nightstands. Absence was a key theme, with the Polaroids and nightstands—both humble holders of mundane personal effects and silent witnesses to life's most intimate moments—standing in for protagonists. Her concurrent "Lady Killer" series similarly explored absence but featured a more direct, aggressive tone and aesthetic.

=== Photography and installations: 1980s and 1990s ===
In the 1980s, Cowin continued to blur fiction and non-fiction in more fully constructed, cinematic scenes—an approach now sometimes called mise-en-scène photography—taking on a directorial mode that included storyboarding, scripting, staging actors, set design and framing. Carefully controlling eye contact, the direction of gazes, gesture, expression and props, she clustered her "sets" with charged symbols and elements in order to create multiple, contradictory readings, while alluding to timeless themes such as romance, abandonment, danger, corruption, and salvation.

Her widely recognized Family Docudrama series (1980–1983) featured consciously staged domestic moments that critics situated in a liminal space between soap opera and conceptual art. Shot in Cowin's home and cast with herself and family members including her twin sister, these tableaux evoked familial intimacy and tension (marital, parental, sibling and professional), as well as a sense of artifice that subtly undermined the illusion of spontaneous documentary. In several works, Cowin used doubling devices—black-and-white background images and her twin—to suggest memory, history, a ghostly or other self, and the challenges of female identity from multiple vantage points. The series' images function as stand-alone multi-layered works, and collectively, as commentary on contemporary American family life, the web of social construction, and the media's blurring of public and the private, which can distort personal moments into pathologically self-conscious "performances."

Eileen Cowin, I’ll Give You Something to Cry About, Photographic installation, 96" x 120", 1998.

In the latter 1980s, Cowin shifted toward more broadly resonant, sparsely staged images that The New York Times compared to the stylized theater work of Robert Wilson and Peter Sellars. Working with models and archetypal, symbolic gestures emerging from inky, black backgrounds, she drew, alternately, on the language of film noir (men in trench coats, women in slinky red dresses, billowing curtains, shadowed backgrounds) and Renaissance tableau vivant paintings. The film noir-ish images evoke elliptical narratives and themes of sexual tension, voyeurism, and rituals of male bonding and competition. Works such as Magritte and Mirror of Venus (1988) invoke and challenge art historical conventions such as the objectification of women or religious narratives, eschewing elaborate sets and period costumes for subtle expressions, dramatic gestures, and recognizable poses.

In the 1990s, Cowin began creating multiple-image works and installations (often mixing photography and video stills) that suggested loose, non-chronological narratives based on the interrelationships of the images and their characters and props. This work included, among others, a 1990 public installation commissioned for New York's Penn Station; Lot’s Wife (1991), which redressed the Biblical story in film noir; the moody, six-image Based on a True Story (1993); and the ominous I’ll Give You Something to Cry About (1996), which distills the passion and dissolution of an actual or conjectured union (including the hint of domestic violence) down to a small cluster of image/memories. Writers described the works' pared visuals as "almost calligraphic in their emotional intensity," noting how Cowin's use of alternating darkness and imagery evoked cinema, the guilty pleasure of voyeurism, memory and the unconscious.

Eileen Cowin, Shelf Life, Photographic installation, Los Angeles International Airport, Terminal 6, 63', 2018.

=== Video, photography and public installations: Since 1996 ===
In her later work, Cowin continues to consider the relationship of narrative, gesture, expression and symbolic objects to fact, fiction and truth, often with a greater emphasis on language and sociopolitical issues. The installation, I See What You're Saying (2002/2011), explored storytelling, truth and lying with images and diptychs that juxtapose altered books with close-ups of eyes and mouths—symbols of seeing and speaking—suggesting stories that migrate from the text to more ambiguous human communication. Blow Me a Kiss (2013), one of two public, site-themed works at Los Angeles International Airport (LAX), comprised four video panels of faces blowing kisses that the Los Angeles Times called "hypnotic." The exhibition "Telling Them Apart" (2024) was structured like a call-and-response in which Cowin’s photographs from the 1980s served as a launching point for new work by herself and Jonesy linked by interests in identity, kinship, narrative, and voyeuristic, film noir-ish spaces.

Much of Cowin's video work, beginning with It Goes Without Saying (1996) and It’s So Good to See You (1999), paradoxically constricts the medium's most useful storytelling device—motion—in favor of stillness, suggestion, and intimate gesture and expression. I give you my word (Best Experimental Film Award, 2003 USA Film Festival), investigates memory and subjectivity with simultaneous split-screens of two people telling the story of the same event. The tightly composed, charged "Your Whole Body is a Target" (2006) explores the appropriation of gesture, self-preservation, fear and communal space, impressionistically depicting self-defense lessons that Cowin undertook in which she plays the roles of empowered and disempowered, assaulter and defender. The videos in her show, Do Nothing Until You Hear From Me (2018), offered ambiguous, suspenseful, and contradictory images that investigated the apprehension and construction of reality and sociopolitical issues such as immigration.

Cowin created two later public artworks at LAX Airport. The 63-foot, photographic mural, Shelf Life (2018), focused on objects in a film-frame-like sequence of images of shelves containing carefully chosen books, photos and keepsakes; the interplay of text, titles and objects suggest narratives on contemporary social themes such as identity, citizenship, travel, place, and universal connection. "The Portrait Project" (2020) centered on human gesture, body language and the subject-photographer exchange through minimal, theatrical images of LAX employees posed with colleagues, friends or family. Cowin's other commissioned public works include billboards for LACMA's "Made in California" show (2000) and MAK Center for Art and Architecture's "How Many Billboards?" show (2010), an installation for Los Angeles MTA's inaugural Metro Rail Light Boxes project, (2001), and a filmstrip-like, 14-sequence installation for the system's Martin Luther King Jr. station, You are heading in the right direction (2015). The latter work employed a poetic juxtaposition of non-linear photographic vignettes of community members that invited viewers to form open-ended, potential narratives of passersby.

=== 2026 LACMA retrospective ===
Cowin's retrospective at LACMA, "Between Panic and Paradise" (2026), spanned her nearly six-decade career with more than 50 prints and videos, ranging from late-1960s magazine-transfer images to her influential staged domestic tableaux to new work addressing aging and death. Critic Hunter Drohojowska-Philp observed,"'Cowin is a pioneer in ways photography came to be used by contemporary artists in the 1970s," as experimental narrative imagery rather than documentation, and as a representation of the emerging feminist consciousness. Leah Ollman noted how the non-chronological, oscillating structure of the exhibition (echoed by the accompanying monograph), resonated with the conception of time expressed by Cowin's work, as "episodic, fragmented, interrupted, layered." The show's new works—the stark portraits of "The Uninvited Visitor" series, and particularly, the video Another Year Closer to Death (both 2026)—were uncharacteristically declarative and autobiographical meditations on time, decline and mortality.

== Recognition and collections ==
Cowin's work belongs to the collections of more than 40 museums, including LACMA, the J. Paul Getty Museum, Brooklyn Museum, Art Institute of Chicago, SFMOMA, Smithsonian American Art Museum, Denver Art Museum, Hammer Museum, Museum of Contemporary Photography, Museum of Fine Arts, Houston, Museum of Modern Art, National Gallery of Canada, Seattle Art Museum and Tokyo Metropolitan Museum of Photography, as well as many private collections. In 2016, Cowin's personal and professional papers were acquired by the Smithsonian Archives of American Art. Her work has been included in many art historical books, monographs, and catalogues, including The History of Photography: An Overview (1999), A History of Women in Photography (1994), and New American Photography (1985).

Cowin has received awards, grants and commissions from Los Angeles World Airports (2019–2020, 2017–2018, 2013), Metropolitan Transit Authority (Los Angeles, 2015–2020), the City of Santa Monica (2014–2015; 2012), California Community Foundation (2012), Center for Cultural Innovation (2011), Sundance Film Festival (2002), California Arts Council (2001), LACMA (2000), City of Los Angeles (1997), Art Matters (1994), Public Art Fund, New York (1990), and National Endowment for the Arts (1990, 1982, 1979, 1974), among others.
