= Andy Grundberg =

American photography critic and writer

- Education: Cornell University (BA); University of North Carolina at Greensboro (MFA)
- Occupations: Critic, writer, curator, educator
- Years active: 1970s–present
- Notable work: Crisis of the Real (1990); How Photography Became Contemporary Art (2021)

Andy Grundberg is an American writer, critic, curator, and educator known for his work on photography. He was photography critic for The New York Times from 1981 to 1991 and later directed the Friends of Photography in San Francisco from 1992 to 1997. He also taught at the Corcoran College of Art and Design, where he chaired the photography department and later was dean of undergraduate studies.

Grundberg has written on the history and criticism of photography and contemporary art. His books include Crisis of the Real (1990) and How Photography Became Contemporary Art (2021). He has organized exhibitions for institutions including the Los Angeles County Museum of Art, the Smithsonian American Art Museum, and the Corcoran Gallery of Art.

== Early life and education ==
Grundberg studied English at Cornell University and graduated in 1969. He later earned an MFA from the University of North Carolina at Greensboro. He has said that Cornell's photography courses were then offered through its agriculture school.

Grundberg moved to New York City in August 1971, intending to write poetry. While living in SoHo, he worked as a day laborer on loft conversions during the neighborhood's transition from an industrial district to an arts community. He later worked as a technical writer in photography before turning to freelance criticism.

== Career ==
=== The New York Times ===
Grundberg was photography critic for The New York Times from 1981 to 1991. He wrote on photography's growing presence in museums and galleries and on its relationship to conceptual art, earth art, performance, and video. His essays addressed established figures including Alfred Stieglitz, Walker Evans, and Robert Frank, as well as contemporary photographers such as Cindy Sherman, Robert Mapplethorpe, Nan Goldin, and Barbara Kruger. He also wrote on documentary photography, photojournalism, and photography's relationship to television. Many of these essays were collected in his 1990 book Crisis of the Real. In his 2021 book How Photography Became Contemporary Art, Grundberg described the 1970s and 1980s as a period in which photography moved from a marginal position in the art world to a central role within contemporary art.

=== Friends of Photography ===
From 1992 to 1997, Grundberg directed Friends of Photography in San Francisco. During his tenure the organization launched see: A Journal of Visual Culture, a quarterly distributed by MIT Press. Grundberg was editor-in-chief. The journal combined photography portfolios with criticism, fiction, and essays on visual culture.

As director, Grundberg expanded the organization's exhibition program beyond the landscape and straight-photography traditions associated with Ansel Adams and the group's founders. The shift drew mixed reactions from longtime supporters and donors.

=== Corcoran and academic work ===
Grundberg later was chair of the photography department and associate provost and dean of undergraduate studies at the Corcoran College of Art and Design in Washington, D.C. The college became part of George Washington University in 2015 and was renamed the Corcoran School of the Arts and Design. In May 2016, Grundberg's contract was not renewed as part of a restructuring that affected more than half of the school's full-time faculty. He was subsequently named professor emeritus.

=== Continued criticism ===
After leaving The New York Times in 1991, Grundberg continued to publish criticism in periodicals including Aperture and The Washington Post. His Summer 2010 Aperture review of Robert Bergman's portrait exhibitions at the National Gallery of Art and MoMA/PS1 drew a published response from the critic David Levi Strauss. Strauss characterized Grundberg's review as a defense of institutional gatekeeping in photography, and argued that Grundberg's principal objection was that Bergman had not been vetted by recognized authorities in the field. Grundberg replied in the magazine's Winter 2010 issue, contending that Bergman's portraits effaced their subjects' social and cultural identities in favor of formalist treatment.

== Curation ==
Reviewers have characterized Grundberg's exhibitions as emphasizing thematic juxtapositions and photography's relationship to broader art-historical questions. Writing in The Washington Post, Philip Kennicott noted Grundberg's use of pairings to surface conceptual relationships between disparate works. Jo Ann Lewis credited Grundberg's commissioning approach in In Response to Place, for which he selected twelve photographers to make new work, as producing "an art show" rather than environmental advocacy.

Grundberg has organized photography exhibitions including:

- Photography and Art: Interactions Since 1946 (1987 to 1988), four-venue touring exhibition originating at the Los Angeles County Museum of Art. Grundberg was guest curator at the Museum of Art, Fort Lauderdale, and co-authored the catalog with Kathleen McCarthy Gauss.
- Images of Desire: Portrayals in Recent Advertising Photography (1989), Goldie Paley Gallery, Moore College of Art and Design.
- Content and Discontent in Today's Photography (1990 to 1996), an Independent Curators International touring exhibition examining strategies of abstraction in postmodern photography. Artists included Uta Barth, Adam Fuss, Thomas Ruff, Andres Serrano, and James Welling.
- Points of Entry: Tracing Cultures (1995 to 1997), the Friends of Photography component of a three-part touring exhibition on immigration, co-organized with the Museum of Photographic Arts in San Diego and the Center for Creative Photography in Tucson. Grundberg wrote the introductory essay to the Tracing Cultures catalog.
- Ansel Adams, A Legacy: Masterworks from The Friends of Photography Collection, National Museum of American Art (1998).
- In Response to Place: Photographs from The Nature Conservancy's Last Great Places (2001), at the Corcoran Gallery of Art. Grundberg commissioned twelve photographers to make new work at the conservancy's reserves to mark its 50th anniversary.
- Annie Leibovitz: Pilgrimage, Smithsonian American Art Museum, January to May 2012. Grundberg was guest curator, with Joann Moser as coordinating curator. The exhibition later toured to eight venues nationally.

== Selected publications ==
- Photography and Art: Interactions Since 1946, with Kathleen McCarthy Gauss (Abbeville Press / Fort Lauderdale Museum of Art / Los Angeles County Museum of Art, 1987) ISBN 9780896596795. OCLC 15016688. Available at Internet Archive
- Alexey Brodovitch, Masters of American Design series (H.N. Abrams, 1989) ISBN 9780810907249. OCLC 224146270
- Grundberg's Goof-Proof Photography Guide (Fireside, 1989) ISBN 9780671672911. OCLC 20016950
- Crisis of the Real: Writings on Photography, 1974–1989, Writers and Artists on Photography series (Aperture, 1990) ISBN 9780893814007. OCLC 23007243; expanded edition 1999
- How Photography Became Contemporary Art: Inside an Artistic Revolution from Pop to the Digital Age (Yale University Press, 2021) ISBN 9780300234107. OCLC 1184239430

== Selected catalog essays and book contributions ==
- "Images of Desire: Portrayals in Recent Advertising Photography" in Images of Desire, exhibition catalog (Goldie Paley Gallery, Moore College of Art and Design, 1989) OCLC 20813229
- Essay in Mike and Doug Starn, with introduction by Robert Rosenblum (H.N. Abrams, 1990) ISBN 9780810938151. OCLC 21151018
- Essay in Andy Warhol Polaroids: 1971–1986 (Pace/MacGill Gallery, Anthony d'Offay Gallery, and Galerie Liliane & Michel Durand-Dessert, 1992) ISBN 9781879532038. OCLC 26755032
- "Andy Warhol's Polaroid Pantheon" in Reframing Andy Warhol: Constructing American Myths, Heroes, and Cultural Icons, edited by Wendy Grossman (University of Maryland Art Gallery, 1998) ISBN 9780937123362. OCLC 40074177
- Essays in Jim Dine: The Photographs, So Far, vol. 4, with catalogue raisonné by Stephanie Wiles (Steidl, 2003) OCLC 249421129
- "Introduction: The Double Life of Ezra Stoller's Photographs" in Ezra Stoller, Photographer by Nina Rappaport and Erica Stoller (Yale University Press, 2012) ISBN 9780300172379. OCLC 785865159
- Introduction in E. Brady Robinson, Art Desks (Daylight Books, 2014) ISBN 9780989798143
- Introduction in Frank DiPerna: Retrospective, exhibition catalog (American University Museum at the Katzen Arts Center, 2018) ISBN 9780999332818. OCLC 1078402089
- "The Itinerant Vision" in Joel Sternfeld, American Prospects, fifth revised edition (Steidl, 2019) ISBN 9783958296695. OCLC 1141781400
- "Light Work at Fifty" in Light Work at 50, edited by Daniel B. Boardman (Light Work, 2025) ISBN 9781945725395. OCLC 1528472967

== Reception ==
=== How Photography Became Contemporary Art ===
How Photography Became Contemporary Art was named a Choice Outstanding Academic Title in 2022 and was included on the Financial Times list of best visual arts books of 2021.

In Afterimage, Tracy Stuber summarized Grundberg's central argument: that photography's move from the margins to the center of American artistic production between the 1960s and 1990s was integral to the transformation of modern art into contemporary art. Library Journal's Shannon Marie Robinson described the book as combining autobiography with criticism, focused on the New York photography scene of the 1970s and 1980s. Reviewing the book in the German-language journal 21: Inquiries into Art, History, and the Visual, Steffen Siegel characterized Grundberg's account as focused on the Manhattan art world. In The Washington Post, Michael S. Roth called it a personal yet balanced account but suggested Grundberg may underestimate the persistent human longing for photographic truth.

=== Crisis of the Real ===
Crisis of the Real collected essays Grundberg wrote for The New York Times and other publications between 1974 and 1989. The book opens with the title essay and is organized into five thematic sections: "Re: Mastering Modernism", "In Search of America", "A New Kind of Art: Camera Culture in the 1980s", "Documentary Dilemmas", and "Photography at the End of the Millennium". In "Ansel Adams: The Politics of Natural Space", Grundberg argued that Adams arrived too late in photographic history to be considered a pioneer of the straight photography style he worked in, and should instead be understood as one of the last Romantic artists.

== Awards ==
- Infinity Award, International Center of Photography
- Leica Medal of Excellence for writing
