= Michael A. Smith (photographer) =

Michael A. Smith (1942 – 2018) was an American photographer known for his contact prints of large format landscape photography.

He was married to large format photographer Paula Chamlee.
