= Suzanne Opton =

American photographer (1945–2024)

- Born: March 14, 1945; Portland, Oregon, U.S.
- Died: July 26, 2024 (aged 79); Corinth, Vermont, U.S.

Suzanne Opton (March 14, 1945 – July 26, 2024) was an American photographer.

For her 2011 book Soldier, Many Wars she took portraits of American soldiers who had recently returned from war. In 2011 she was a fellow of the John Simon Guggenheim Memorial Foundation. Her work is included in the collections of the Smithsonian American Art Museum and the Brooklyn Museum.

Opton died in Corinth, Vermont on July 26, 2024, at the age of 79.
