= Jo Ann Walters =

American photographer (born 1952)

Jo Ann Walters (born December 10, 1952) is an American photographer. A 1985 Guggenheim Fellow, she is known for her 2018 book Wood River Blue Pool, and her photographs focus on landscapes, women, and the American working class.

== Biography ==
Jo Ann Walters was born in December 10, 1952, in Alton, Illinois, and raised in the aforementioned town, where her father was a local businessman who dealt in sheet metal fabrication. She obtained her BA in Education (1975) in Arizona State University and, after spending two summers at the Maine Photographic Workshops in 1979 and 1980, her MFA (1983) in Photography in Ohio University; she later recalled feelings of isolation and shock "as [she] moved farther and farther away from home".

From 1982 to 1984, she worked in Camden, Maine as a custom printer and freelance photographer. After working at Yale University as a visiting lecturer since 1984, she joined the faculty in 1985 as an assistant professor. She later worked at the Rhode Island School of Design, before moving to State University of New York at Purchase, where she was eventually promoted to associate professor and served as Chair of Photography.

In addition to several group exhibitions throughout the United States, she had a solo exhibition, Landscapes (1985), at the Bay Vista Photography Gallery in Miami, Florida. In 1985, she was awarded a Guggenheim Fellowship in photography; she would therefore take this opportunity that year to start a project on photographing working-class rural people throughout the United States, particularly women and children. That year, in the Chicago Tribune's review of the Museum of Contemporary Photography group exhibition New Color/New Work, Abigail Foerstner called "Thresholds", her photographic essay on backyards in the Midwest, "lyrical scenes where colors are muted yet luminous".

Richard Nilsen of The Arizona Republic praised her photographs on Northeastern front yards with overgrown vegetation at her 1987 solo exhibition at Arizona State University as "both the most sensuously beautiful and the most intellectually astute photographs I have seen in a long time", saying that they "are not only beefsteak for the eyes, they help define where modern photography may be going". Schwendenwien said that Walters' some of Walters' photographs from her Women, Girls, Families series, namely those showcased at the 1990 Aetna Photography Series 3 exhibition at the Aetna Institute Gallery in Hartford, Connecticut, "harks back to snapshots from the '60s". Kyle MacMillan of the Omaha World-Herald said her work at her 1993 solo exhibition Portraits of Women and Girls was "compelling if unsettling". She was also awarded a 2002 Peter S. Reed Foundation grant in photography, as well as the Ferguson Award and a John Anson Kittredge Fund Fellowship.

In October 2018, Walters published her Guggenheim Fellowship work as a monograph, Wood River Blue Pool, published by Image Text Ithaca and with text by Laura Wexler; it was named after Wood River and Blue Pool, both nearby her native Alton. In 2020, another solo exhibition, Where Was It, The World?, was held at Eastern Tennessee University Slocumb Galleries; it depicts impoverished rural people in the Southern United States.

According to Jude Schwendenwien of the Hartford Courant, Walters' photography "runs the gamut from benign landscapes in Ohio, Illinois and Maine to tender moments between mothers and children that would look great in Life magazine". Her work has been in the collections of the Bibliothèque nationale de France, Center for Fine Photography, Mumbai, Library of Congress, Museum of Modern Art, Peabody Essex Museum, San Francisco Museum of Modern Art, and Saint Louis Art Museum.

Walters lives in New England.

== Solo exhibitions ==
- Landscapes (1985), Bay Vista Photography Gallery, Miami, Florida.
- Photographs by Jo Ann Walters (1987), Northlight Gallery, Arizona State University
- Portraits of Women and Girls (October 1993), Richards Hall, University of Nebraska–Lincoln
- Where Was It, The World? (February 2020), Eastern Tennessee University Slocumb Galleries

== Bibliography ==
- Wood River Blue Pool (2018)
