= Suzanne Szasz =

Hungarian-born American photographer

Suzanne Szasz (October 20, 1915 – July 3, 1997) was a Hungarian-born American photographer of children and family life.

== Biography ==
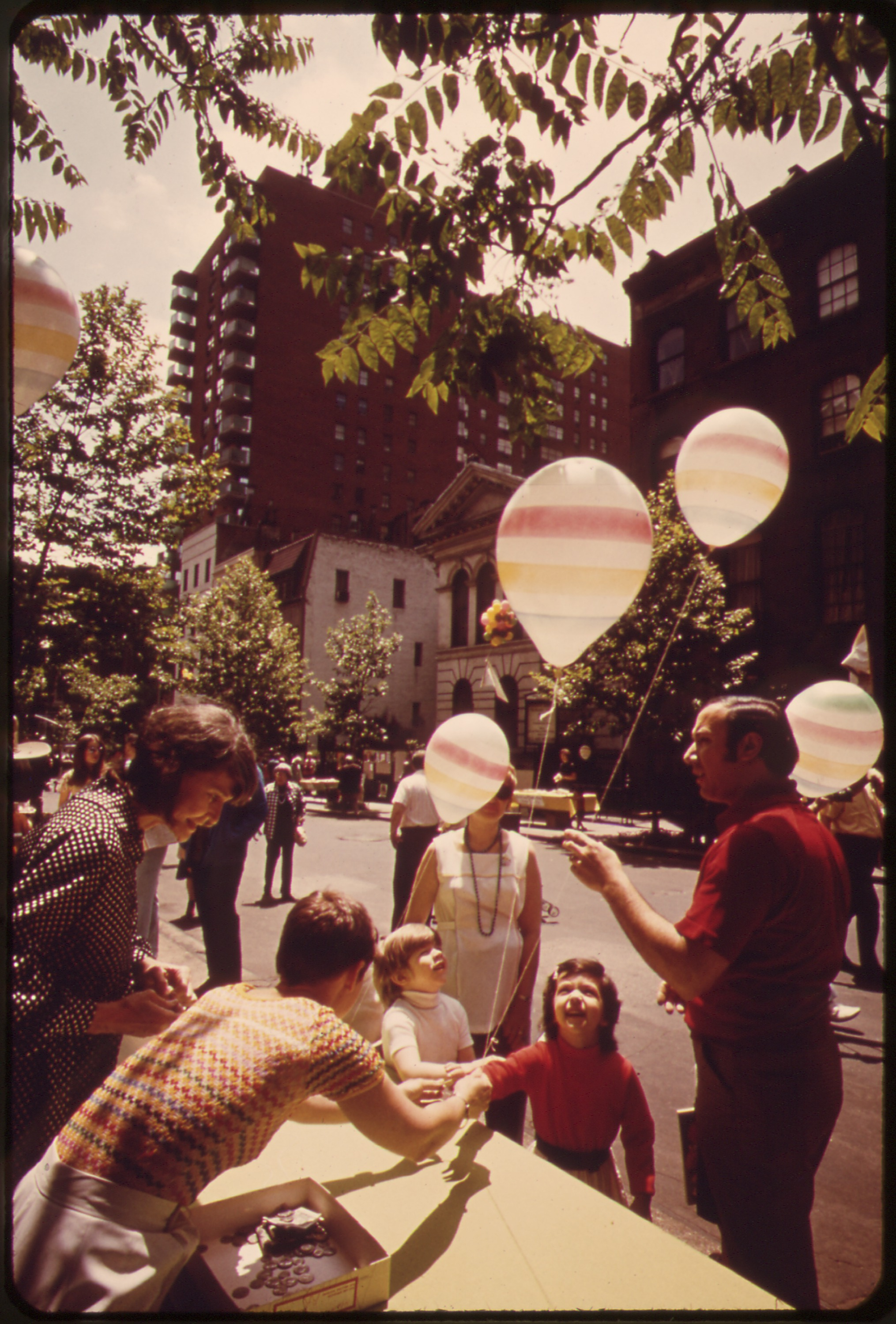
Suzanne Szasz (June 1973) At a Block Party on East 35th Street between Lexington and Madison Avenue.

She was born Suzanne Szekely in 1915 in Budapest, daughter of Joseph Szekely, a doctor, and Maria (née Baron). At thirty-one, Szasz moved to the United States in 1946.

In 1947, she divorced her first husband, the diplomat Sandor Szasz. That year, while working as a counsellor at a children's summer camp in New York State, she began photographing with a borrowed camera. Encouraged by winning a cover competition for the Ladies' Home Journal, she became a freelance photographer, selling pictures to Life, Look, Parents, Good Housekeeping, McCall's and Family Circle. An example of her work of this period, rare because it was specially commissioned instead of being "on spec", is a story she made, with minimum equipment and mostly available light, over the course of eight months in 1952 for Women's Home Companion magazine; photographs in the children's polio ward of New York's Willard Parker Hospital. The series centres on six-year-old Eileen Dicheck. Interviewed for a Photography magazine article covering her approach to the story, she says:

I photograph best when other people are present–where there is a relationship between the child and other children or adults. If you put me in a room alone with a child then I can only photograph my relation to the child. But I am interested in the real relationships that chIldren have with the world around them, and not how they act in front of the camera.

From the 1950s onward, she photographed, along with Ray Schorr, at the Pinewoods Camp at Long Pond in Plymouth, Massachusetts, for traditional dance and music.

Szasz's arresting low-light image of a wide-eyed girl in a toy indian headdress was selected by Edward Steichen for the "Childhood Magic" section of the world-touring The Family of Man show for the Museum of Modern Art, which was seen by nine million viewers. She went on to participate in four other international group exhibitions in Europe and held a series of shows in New York.

Throughout the 1960s and 1970s, Szasz produced portraits of artists and musicians including Russell Oberlin, Leonard Bernstein, Roslyn Tureck, Hilaire Hiler, Sylvia Marlowe, and Lee Hoiby, working alongside, or co-credited with, her husband Ray Schorr.

== Value to psychology of Szasz's imagery ==
Child psychologists, including Bruno Bettelheim and doctors at the Gesell Institute of Human Development in New Haven found Szasz's capacity to work with children, and ability to seem to "disappear" when taking her apparently intimate and candid pictures, of value to their work and collaborated with her. She assisted in another study of women who used the birth control pill in Puerto Rico in 1962. Her work illustrated articles of Margaret Mead, Elizabeth Taleporos, Karl W. Deutsch and others.

Though she was not a parent herself, in the context of the post-war baby boom, Szasz's books on – and imagery of – child-rearing proved popular amongst an audience of anxious first-time parents eager for information and affirmation. Dr. Benjamin Spock, who wrote introductions to two of her books described her as "a sensitive student of [children's] feelings".

== Contributions to the profession ==
Szasz was a founding and active member of the American Society of Magazine Photographers, through which she promoted the standing of women in the profession. She contributed numbers of texts on technique in photography, particularly on using available light, and her speciality, capturing children and their parents in a natural and unobtrusive manner. Other texts demonstrate her ability to "read" and interpret body language, gesture and other visual clues of emotion.

== Personal life ==
In America, on December 22, 1956, Szasz married Ray Shorr, also a photographer, and they remained together until his death in 1994. There were no children from either of her marriages. Szasz died on July 3, 1997, in her native Budapest whilst visiting her relatives.

== Books ==
- Prudden, Bonnie; Szasz, Suzanne (1987), Fitness from six to twelve (1st Ballantine Books ed.), Ballantine Books, ISBN 978-0-345-33302-5
- Szasz, Suzanne; Taleporos, Elizabeth (1984), Sisters, brothers, and others (1st ed.), W.W. Norton, ISBN 978-0-393-01810-3
- Szasz, Suzanne (1980), The unspoken language of children, Norton, ISBN 978-0-393-00989-7
- Szasz, Suzanne (1978), The body language of children (1st ed.), Norton, ISBN 978-0-393-01175-3
- Suzanne Szasz (1977), Modern wedding photography, New York American Photographic, ISBN 978-0-8174-2439-8
- Hayes, Dannielle B (1977), Women photograph men, Morrow, ISBN 978-0-688-03214-2
- Szasz, Suzanne (1976), Child photography simplified, Amphoto, ISBN 978-0-8174-0190-0
- Szasz, Suzanne (1966), How I photograph children, Amphoto
- Szasz, Suzanne; Gallico, Paul (1964), The silent miaow: a manual for kittens, strays, and homeless cats, Crown Publishers, ISBN 978-0-517-50305-8
- Szasz, Suzanne; Lyman, Susan Elizabeth (1960), Young folks' New York, Crown Publishers
- Szasz, Suzanne; Katz, Phyllis B; Wholberg, Meg (1960), The child care guide: and family adviser, The Parents' Institute, Inc
- Appell, Clara (1959), We are six: the story of a family, Golden Press
- Szasz, Suzanne (1957), Guide to photographing children, Greenberg
- Wright, George B., ed. (1955), Available light and your camera, American Photographic Book Pub. Co
- Langstaff, N.; Szasz, S. (1955), A tiny baby for you, Harcourt, Brace. New York
- Wolf, Anna W. M; Szasz, Suzanne (1954), Helping your child's emotional growth, Doubleday

== Articles ==
- Anna W. M. Wolf & Suzanne Szasz. 'David makes a friend'. In Woman's home companion. August 1950
- Anna W. M. Wolf & Suzanne Szasz. 'Let me have it'. In Woman's home companion, September 1950
- Szasz, Suzanne, 'How to Read Your Child's Body Language'. in Good Housekeeping; New York Vol. 186, Iss. 6, (Jun 1978): 80, 82, 84, 86.

== Texts about ==
- Kreisel, Martha (1999), American women photographers: a selected and annotated bibliography, Greenwood Press, pp. 268–269, ISBN 978-0-313-30478-1

== Exhibitions ==
=== Solo exhibitions ===
- December 1, 1982 – December 31, 1982 Suzanne Szasz: Juxtapositions. Photography Unlimited Gallery, New York.
- The Hungarian National Gallery in Budapest (retrospective 1982)
- January 11, 1981 – February 11, 1981, Suzanne Szasz: Children and Other People in Black and White from 1950 to the Present. Camera Club of New York.
- February 1982. Suzanne Szasz: Children and Other People. Neikrug Gallery, New York.

=== Group exhibitions ===
- December 12, 1977 - January 15, 1978 Weltausstellung der Fotografie - Die Kinder dieser Welt. 515 Fotos aus 94 Ländern von 238 Fotografen. Hochschule für Gestaltung und Kunst Zürich, HGKZ, Switzerland.
- September 16, 1977 – October 9, 1977 Women Photograph Men. International Center of Photography, New York.
- September – October 1975 Breadth of Vision: Portfolios of Women Photographers Museum at the Fashion Institute of Technology, New York.
- October 13, 1973 - Nov 18, 1973. 3rd Weltausstellung der Fotografie - Unterwegs zum Paradies. Gruner + Jahr AG, Druck- und Verlagshaus, Stern, Hamburg, Germany
- December 6, 1968 - January 5, 1969 Die Frau - 2nd Weltausstellung der Photographie. Kunstgewerbemuseum der Stadt Zürich, KGMZ, Switzerland.
- October 2, 1964 - November 8, 1964, Der Mensch - First Weltausstellung der Fotografie. Organisiert von 26 europäischen Museen zum Thema: Was ist der Mensch?. Kunstgewerbemuseum der Stadt Zürich, KGMZ, CH.
- January 24, 1955 - May 8, 1955 The Family of Man. The Museum of Modern Art, New York
