= Julia Scully =

American editor and memoirist (1929–2023)

Julia Scully (February 9, 1929 – July 18, 2023) was an American photography editor and memoirist. She was the editor of Modern Photography magazine.

In 1998, she published her memoir Outside Passage: A Memoir of an Alaskan Childhood.
