= Estelle Jussim =

American historian of photography (1927–2004)

- Jussim in 1980
- Born: March 18, 1927; Manhattan, New York, U.S.
- Died: March 1, 2004 (aged 76); Holyoke, Massachusetts, U.S.
- Education: Queens College (BA); Columbia University (DLS)
- Occupations: Historian of photography, writer, professor
- Employer: Simmons College
- Known for: Visual Communication and the Graphic Arts; Landscape as Photograph

Estelle Jussim (March 18, 1927 – March 1, 2004) was an American historian of photography, writer, and professor. She taught at Hampshire College and then at Simmons College in Boston, where she was on the graduate faculty from 1972 until her retirement in 1992.

Her books on photographic history and visual culture include Visual Communication and the Graphic Arts (1974), a study of nineteenth-century photographic technologies; Slave to Beauty (1981), a biography of the photographer F. Holland Day; and Landscape as Photograph (1985), co-authored with Elizabeth Lindquist-Cock. Her 1977 article "The Research Uses of Visual Information" has been cited as foundational to the study of visual materials in libraries and archives.

Jussim received a Guggenheim Fellowship in 1982 and an honorary doctorate from Linköping University in 1990. Simmons University's School of Library and Information Science established the Estelle Jussim Award for the Visual Arts in her name.

== Early life and education ==
Jussim was born on March 18, 1927, in Manhattan, New York, the daughter of Boris and Manya (Glusker) Jussim. Her father was a photographer. She earned a Bachelor of Arts cum laude from Queens College in 1947. She later earned a Doctorate of Library Service from Columbia University in the late 1960s.

== Career ==
From 1967 to 1972 Jussim taught History of Communications at Hampshire College in Amherst, Massachusetts. In 1972 she joined the graduate school of Simmons College in Boston, where she taught History of Photography, History of Rare Books, and graphic arts and communications until her retirement in 1992, after which she was named professor emeritus of the Graduate School of Library and Information Science. She served on the International Advisory Board of History of Photography, a peer-reviewed journal based in London, from at least 1978. She lectured widely, at venues including Smith College, the College of Santa Fe, and the Amon Carter Museum in Texas. Her lecture at the Amon Carter Museum formed the basis of her 1983 book Frederic Remington, the Camera, and the Old West. Linköping University in Sweden awarded her an honorary doctorate in 1990.

== Scholarship ==
Jussim wrote on the history and criticism of photography, drawing on postmodern, deconstructionist, and feminist perspectives.

=== Books ===
Visual Communication and the Graphic Arts (1974) examined the development of photographic technologies and their cultural implications. Scholar Susan O. Thompson described it as "ground-breaking." The book was discussed in Art Journal alongside the work of William M. Ivins Jr. and André Malraux, and was cited as a standard reference in Victorian Periodicals Review.

Slave to Beauty: The Eccentric Life and Controversial Career of F. Holland Day (1981) examined the life and work of F. Holland Day within the cultural and artistic contexts of his time. Reviewing the book in Artforum, Kelly Wise described it as "an appealing biography" and praised Jussim's treatment of the rivalry between Day and Alfred Stieglitz as "mischievous and entertaining."

Landscape as Photograph (1985), co-authored with Elizabeth Lindquist-Cock, examined American landscape photography from the 1840s through the 1980s, arguing that photographs are interpretive constructs shaped by cultural assumptions. Suzanne Muchnic, writing in the Los Angeles Times, noted the authors' argument that "a photograph is as much an act of interpretation as it is an artifact." John Raeburn, in Environmental Review, called it "an essential book for anyone interested in how photographs convey ideas about the natural environment." Kenneth I. Helphand, in Design Book Review, situated the book within contemporary landscape scholarship.

=== Other scholarship ===
Jussim's 1977 article "The Research Uses of Visual Information," published in Library Trends, distinguished between visual information and visual communication, and between "search" and "research" as modes of inquiry. Writing in The American Archivist in 2004, Joan M. Schwartz cited the article as foundational to the field and listed Jussim alongside Victor Burgin, Richard Bolton, and Barbara Maria Stafford as a key figure in visual materials scholarship.

Jussim contributed essays, introductions, and forewords to major exhibition catalogues, monographs, and anthologies published by institutions including the Friends of Photography, the Walker Art Center, the Center for Creative Photography, and Aperture. Her essays appeared alongside those of Beaumont Newhall, Nathan Lyons, Naomi Rosenblum, Alan Trachtenberg, and Van Deren Coke.

In 1984 the Walker Art Center invited Jussim as one of six scholars to participate in the Image and Message lecture series, funded by the National Endowment for the Humanities and directed by John Schott, held in conjunction with the exhibition The 20th-Century Poster: Design of the Avant-Garde. Her essay "The Self-Reflexive Camera" (1989) was anthologized in Photography: 1900 to the Present (Prentice Hall, 1998). She contributed "Images of Apocalypse," a review essay on survivor drawings of the Hiroshima and Nagasaki bombings, to the Boston Review in 1981.

== Publications ==
=== Books ===
- Visual Communication and the Graphic Arts: Photographic Technologies in the Nineteenth Century (R.R. Bowker, 1974; reprinted with revised preface, 1983)
- Slave to Beauty: The Eccentric Life and Controversial Career of F. Holland Day (D.R. Godine, 1981)
- Frederic Remington, the Camera, and the Old West (Amon Carter Museum, 1983)
- Landscape as Photograph (Yale University Press, 1985, co-authored with Elizabeth Lindquist-Cock; reprinted UMI Books on Demand, 1998)
- Stopping Time: The Photographs of Harold Edgerton (Harry N. Abrams, 1987)
- The Eternal Moment: Essays on the Photographic Image (Aperture, 1989)

=== Edited works ===
- Eyes of Time: Photojournalism in America (Little, Brown in association with the International Museum of Photography at George Eastman House, 1988, co-edited with Marianne Fulton)
- Mothers and Daughters: That Special Quality: An Exploration in Photography (Aperture Foundation, 1989, co-edited with Tillie Olsen and Julie Olsen Edwards)

=== Selected articles ===
- "The Research Uses of Visual Information," Library Trends 25, no. 4 (1977): 763–778
- "Images of Apocalypse," Boston Review (1981)
- "The Self-Reflexive Camera" (1989), anthologized in Photography: 1900 to the Present, ed. Diana Emery Hulick and Joseph Marshall (Prentice Hall, 1998)

== Awards and recognition ==
- Guggenheim Fellowship, 1982
- Honorary doctorate, Linköping University, Sweden, 1990
- New York Historical Society prize for distinctive achievement in the history of photography, for Slave to Beauty
- Estelle Jussim Award for the Visual Arts, established in her name by the School of Library and Information Science at Simmons University
