= Friends of Photography =

American nonprofit organization

Friends of Photography was a nonprofit organization started by Ansel Adams and others in 1967 to promote photography as a fine art. During its existence the organization held at least 330 photography exhibitions at its galleries in Carmel and San Francisco, California, and it published a lengthy series of monographs under the name Untitled.The organization was formally dissolved in 2001.

== History ==
On January 1, 1967, Ansel Adams held a gathering of friends and associates at his home in Carmel, California, to talk about starting a new organization to promote photography. Those who attended were his wife Virginia Adams, Beaumont Newhall and Nancy Newhall, Morley Baer, Edgar Bissantz, Art Connell, Liliane de Cock, Rosario Mazzeo, Gerry Sharpe, Brett Weston and Gerald Robinson. In its first publication, Portfolio I: The Persistence of Beauty, published in 1969, Nancy Newhall wrote about this meeting:

... on New Years' Day 1967, a dozen or so of us met at Ansel Adams' house. Such a group might easily have become merely local, devoted to showing the work of the extraordinary constellation of photographers who live nearby. Instead, we decided to found a society, national and even international in scope, whose purpose should serve as the long-dreamed-of center, bringing in outstanding talent from everywhere, initiating exhibitions, holding workshops and programs of lectures and films, and publishing, in various forms, mongraphs on individual photographers and works of interpretation, enlightened criticism and history. The membership should include not only practicing photographers but musicians, poets, painters, sculptors, critics, collectors, art historians, museum directors and others who are deeply interested. And so we called ourselves The Friends of Photography.

During the first decade the organization operated with an all-volunteer committee structure, and it grew rapidly because the exhibitions held at its Carmel gallery were very successful, attracting both local collectors and artists as well as visitors from around the country. In addition, they instituted a series of very popular classes, seminars and workshops that raised both the profile of the organization and brought in regular revenues in addition to donations by its members. In 1972 it began to publish a magazine called Untitled, which after two years turned into an ongoing series of monographs. The exhibitions and publications helped build the reputation of the organization, which rapidly increased in size and scope.

As they grew, they hired a series of photography and fundraising professionals to run the organization, including William Turnage, Fred Parker, James Enyeart, James Alinder, Lynn Upchurch and Ron Egherman. Each person brought a personal style to the organization, but through it all there remained the guiding vision of its founder Ansel Adams. He remained an active member of the organization's board, and almost nothing happened without his approval.

Adams died in 1984, and with his death the organization began to explore its future course. The organization was founded and remained in Carmel primarily because that was where Adams lived. With his death that constraint was removed, and at the same time the photography and art gallery market in San Francisco was significantly expanding. The Trustees decided that to optimize their mission of promoting fine art photography the organization should reach out to a larger audience, and they began to raise money to move to a new building in San Francisco. At the time the organization had an annual operating budget of $1.6 million and a membership of 15,000 individuals.

After a three-year fundraising campaign, the organization raised $2.5 million to lease and renovate a former health clinic in the Yerba Buena district of San Francisco. They named the new building the Ansel Adams Center. At the time the new building opened it was the largest photography center on the West Coast, with changing exhibitions in four different galleries plus a separate gallery permanently devoted to showing the works of Adams.

In 1992 the organization held The Ansel Adams Scholars Conference, the first comprehensive look at Adams' work in the context of his environmental activism and the work of other photographers during his lifetime. The following year they published a book, Ansel Adams: New Light, Essays on His Legacy and Legend, which provided a written record for some of the proceedings of the conference and added additional thoughts by other scholars.

From 1992 to 1997 the organization was directed by Andy Grundberg, who previously had been the photography critic for The New York Times. Grundberg thought the organization could attract new members by broadening the kinds of photography it exhibited, and he initiated a series of shows by photographers whose artistic vision was very different from Adams and his circle. The traditional members of the organization did not like this new direction, and important donors showed their displeasure by reducing or ending their support. By the time Grundberg left the organization it was $500,000 in debt.

At this same time the organization faced a series of unfortunate events that further exacerbated its financial situation. The original lease on their building expired, and the landlord sought a 400% increase in rent. Unable to afford this added cost, the organization decided to move to a new location on Mission Street. However, construction delays at the new site caused the organization to be without a home for more than a year. During that time it lost more than half of its membership.

During the closure, the organization hired Deborah Klochko as executive director and launched a new fundraising campaign to help pay off its debts. They scaled back their operations by cutting hours and reducing the number of exhibitions to be shown at the new gallery. In spite of these efforts the organization continued to lose money.

In early 2001 the debts incurred by the organization totalled $1.2 million, with $350,000 of that amount due immediately. Although appeals were made to donors, the amount of the debt was too large to overcome. The Trustees voted to close the organization but voted unanimously that it would not declare bankruptcy. They decided instead to sell their collection of Adams prints given to the organization by the photographer in the 1970s and use the proceeds to pay off all debts.

The entire collection of 140 prints was bought by Tom and Lynn Meredith of Austin, Texas, with the proceeds paying off the organization's debt. The Friends of Photography formally closed its doors in October, 2001.

== Exhibitions ==
In June 1967 the organization held its first exhibition at the Sunset Cultural Center in Carmel. Six photographers were included in the exhibition: Ansel Adams, Wynn Bullock, Imogen Cunningham, Dorothea Lange, Brett Weston and Minor White. Four other exhibitions were held throughout the rest of 1967. In 1969 a second gallery was opened in the Sunset Center, and until 1976 two exhibitions were often held at the same time. In 1976 the additional gallery was reclaimed as office space, and only one exhibition at a time was held after that. The Friends continued to hold about 10 exhibitions annually in Carmel until 1988. After they moved into the Ansel Adams Center in 1989 they continued offering larger and sometimes multiple simultaneous exhibitions including Jo Ann Walters.

== Workshops, classes and seminars ==
In addition to the exhibitions, the Friends regularly held educational workshops, seminars, photographic technique classes and scholarly conferences. The first was held in 1967, and by 1975 they were presenting about 8-10 per year. During the first 20 years most of these events were held in Carmel.

== Publications ==
=== Portfolios ===
In 1969 and 1970 an annual portfolio of high-quality print reproductions was presented as benefits to the members of the organization.

- Portfolio I: The Persistence of Beauty (1969), included prints by Ansel Adams, Bill Brandt, Wynn Bullock, Harry Callahan, Henri Cartier-Bresson, Imogen Cunningham, Aaron Siskind, W. Eugene Smith, Paul Strand, Frederick Sommer, Brett Weston and Minor White.
- Portfolio II: Discovery: Inner and Outer Worlds (1970), included prints by Dave Bohn, John Brook, Reva Brooks, Paul Caponigro, Marie Cosindas, Judy Dater, Liliane DeCock, Ray K. Metzker, Roger Minick, Gordon Parks, Edward Putzar, Geraldine Sharpe, E. Florian Steiner, Jerry N. Uelsmann, and Todd Walker.

=== Untitled ===
In 1972 the Friends began publishing a magazine called Untitled. The publication grew in length and format until issue 7/8, published in 1974, when it evolved into a monograph format with a specific name for each publication. It continued in a monograph format until publication ceased in 1994. In all, 58 numbered titles were published.

=== Books ===
The Friends occasionally published books independently from their Untitled series, including books on Carleton Watkins, Robert Heinecken. and on health hazards in photography.

== Awards to photographers ==
In 1980 the Trustees of the organization established two awards to recognize "individuals with records of outstanding contribution to the field." Awards were presented annually in the following categories:

=== Distinguished Career in Photography ===
- 1980: Harry Callahan
- 1981: Aaron Siskind
- 1982: Frederick Sommer
- 1983: Berenice Abbott
- 1984: André Kertész
- 1985: Beaumont Newhall
- 1986: Robert Frank

=== Photographer of the Year ===
- 1980: Lee Friedlander
- 1981: Joel Meyerowitz
- 1982: Robert Adams
- 1983: Paul Caponigro
- 1984: Jerry Uelsmann
- 1985: Robert Heinecken
- 1986: Linda Connor
