= Barbara Kasten =

American artist (born 1936)

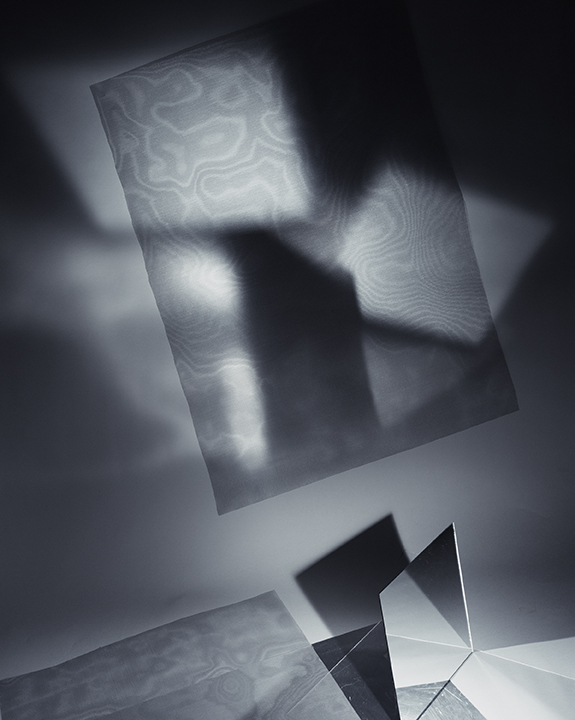
- Scene III, 2012
- Born: 1936 (age 89–90); Chicago, IL
- Education: California College of Arts and Crafts
- Known for: Conceptual Art
- Movement: Contemporary Art
- Awards: Guggenheim Fellowship; National Endowment of the Arts Grant; Fulbright Hays Fellowship; Distinguished College Artist, Columbia College Chicago
- Website: barbarakasten.net

Barbara Kasten (born 1936) is an American artist from Chicago Illinois. Her work involves the use of abstract video and photograph projections.

== Schooling and career ==
Kasten trained as a painter and textile artist at the University of Arizona (BFA), the California College of Arts & Crafts (MFA) with Trude Guermonprez, and a Fulbright-Hays Fellowship at the University of Fine Arts in Poznań with Magdalena Abakanowicz. She was influenced by the Bauhaus movement and László Moholy-Nagy. After school, she turned to photography to encompass her interdisciplinary work, beginning in 1973 with the commercial process of diazotype and subjects reminiscent of performance art. Working for over 40 years, she is often inspired by the act of depicting a three-dimensional space onto a two-dimensional plane. She often uses mirrors, lights, and props for conceptually-based pieces. As she continues her practice, her work has continued to pure abstraction.

Kasten completed her Master in Fine Arts Degree in sculpture textile design from California College of Arts and Crafts in 1970.

She has won many awards, notably the John Simon Guggenheim Fellowship in 1982.

In 2015, Kasten was given the first career survey of her work, entitled "Barbara Kasten: Stages" at the Institute of Contemporary Art, Philadelphia. It traveled to the Graham Foundation for Advanced Studies in the Fine Arts where it was presented in conjunction with the Chicago Architecture Biennial.

Kasten's work was included in the 2021 exhibition Women in Abstraction at the Centre Pompidou. Her work was included in the 2024 exhibition Making Their Mark: Works from the Shah Garg Collection at the Berkeley Art Museum and Pacific Film Archive (BAMPFA).

== Monographs ==
- Barbara Kasten: Architecture & Film (2015–2020), edited by Stephanie Cristello. Texts by Stephanie Cristello, Hans Ulrich Obrist, Humberto Moro, and Mimi Zeiger. Milan: Skira, 2022. (ISBN 978-88-572-4719-9)
- Barbara Kasten: The Diazotypes, edited by Ellen Alderman and Lisa Leshowitz, text by Alex Klein. Chicago: Graham Foundation; New York: DAP, 2015. (ISBN 9781938922886)
- Barbara Kasten: Stages, JRP|Ringier, Zurich, essays by Alex Kitnick, Alex Klein, Jenni Sorkin (2015) (ISBN 9783037644102)
- Barbara Kasten: Works 1986-1990, RAM, Tokyo, Japan, essays by Deborah Irmas, Meg Perlman, Michele Druon (1991) (ISBN 096307850X)
- Constructs: Barbara Kasten, New York Graphic Society and The Polaroid Corporation, essay by Estelle Jussim (1985) (ISBN 0821215833)
- How We See: Photobooks by Women, 10x10 Photobooks, (2018) (ISBN 9780692144299)

== Public collections ==
- Art Institute of Chicago, Chicago, Illinois
- Museum of Modern Art, New York, New York
- Museum of Contemporary Art, Los Angeles, California
- Los Angeles County Museum of Art, Los Angeles, California
- TATE Modern, London, UK
- New Mexico Museum of Art, Santa Fe, New Mexico
- Ackland Art Museum, Chapel Hill, North Carolina
- Center for Creative Photography, University of Arizona, Tucson, Arizona
- Washington State Arts Commission, Olympia, Washington
- Saddle Mountain Elementary School, Mattawa, Washington

== Selected solo exhibitions ==
- "Barbara Kasten: Works", Kunstmuseum Wolfsburg, Germany (2020)
- "Sharjah Biennial 14: Leaving the Echo Chamber", Sharjah Biennial, Sharjah, U.A.E. (2019)
- "Intervention, 2018" at Creative Chicago: An Interview Marathon, AON Grand Ballroom, Navy Pier, Chicago, Illinois (2018)
