= Aaron Siskind =

American photographer (1903–1991)

- Siskind, c. 1950
- Born: December 4, 1903; New York City, U.S.
- Died: February 8, 1991 (aged 87); Providence, Rhode Island, U.S.
- Known for: Photography

Aaron Siskind (December 4, 1903 – February 8, 1991) was an American photographer whose work focuses on the details of things, presented as flat surfaces to create a new image independent of the original subject. He was closely involved with, if not a part of, the abstract expressionist movement, and was close friends with artists Franz Kline (whose own breakthrough show at the Charles Egan Gallery occurred in the same period as Siskind's one-man shows at the same gallery), Mark Rothko, and Willem de Kooning.

== Personal life ==
Siskind was born in New York City, growing up on the Lower East Side. Shortly after graduating from City College, he became a public school English teacher. Siskind was a grade school English teacher in the New York Public School System for 25 years, and began photography when he received a camera as a wedding gift and began taking pictures on his honeymoon.

After joining the Young People’s Socialist League, he met Sidonie, also known as Sonia, Glatter in 1917. A few years later, in 1929, he married her in the spring. In 1942, Aaron met Ethel Jones, with whom he stayed for several years. He divorced Sonia in 1945. Five years later, he met Cathy Spencer and married her in the summer of 1952. He separated from her in 1956, and divorced her a year later. In the summer of 1959, he met Carolyn Brandt and had his third marriage on June 25, 1960. He remained married until his wife's death on January 30, 1976.

== Career ==
Early in his career Siskind was a member of the New York Photo League, where he produced several significant socially conscious series of images in the 1930s, among them "Harlem Document", a book published in 1981 featuring a collection of 52 photographs, including portraits of residents, as well as photographs of street and domestic life in Harlem. Along with the photographs, the book features interviews, stories and rhymes collected by members of the Federal Writers’ Project. The Harlem Document was aimed to showcase the reality of urban life in New York.

In the 1940s, Siskind lived above the Corner Book Shop, at 102 Fourth Avenue in Manhattan; he also maintained a darkroom at this location.

In 1950 Siskind met Harry Callahan when both were teaching at Black Mountain College in the summer, where he also met Robert Rauschenberg who throughout his life always kept a particular Siskind print on his work wall (see MoMA retrospective 2017). Later, Callahan persuaded Siskind to join him as part of the faculty of the IIT Institute of Design in Chicago (founded by László Moholy-Nagy as the New Bauhaus). In 1971 he followed Callahan (who had left in 1961) by his invitation to teach at the Rhode Island School of Design, until both retired in the late 1970s.

Siskind used subject material from the real world: close-up details of painted walls and graffiti, tar repair on asphalt pavement, rocks, lava flows, dappled shadows on an old horse, Olmec stone heads, ancient statuary and the Arch of Constantine in Rome, and a series of nudes ("Louise").

Siskind worked all over the world, visiting Mexico in 1955 and the 1970s, and Rome in 1963 and 1967. He did the Tar Series in Providence, Vermont, and Route 88 near Westport, Rhode Island, in the 1980s. He continued making photographs until his death from a stroke on February 8, 1991.

=== Creation of the Feature Group ===
In 1936, he created a group within the Photo League in New York, which he called the Feature Group. The group’s collective aim was to produce photographic-centred books. The “Harlem Document” became the most notable project produced by them, which explored the socioeconomic situation that the people living in Harlem were experiencing.

In the decades that followed, Siskind’s interest in politics shifted to a more poetic and formal style of photography, zoning on the decay and degeneration found in New York City, and this new style is what garnered him worldwide recognition as a photographer. Siskind’s process revolved around hyper-focusing on what he was photographing, and leaving the background blurry or distractions out of frame.

=== MoMA exhibitions featuring Siskind's work ===
From 1941 to 2022, Siskind’s photographs have been featured in 38 exhibitions at MoMA in New York City.

- "Image of Freedom" (October 1941 - February 1942)
- "New Photographer" (June - September 1946)
- "In and Out of Focus - A Survey of Today’s Photography" (April - July 1946)
- "Photographs by 51 Photographers" (August - September 1950)
- "Abstraction in Photography" (May - July 1951)
- "Christmas Photographs" (November 1951 - January 1952)
- "Then and Now" (August 1952)
- "Diogenes with a Camera II" (November 1952 - March 1953)
- "Photographs from the Museum Collection" (November 1958 - January 1959)
- "Photographs for the Museum Collection" (October 1960)
- "50 Photographs by 50 Photographers" (April - May 1962)
- "Art in a Changing World: 1884–1964: Edward Steichen Photography Center" (May 1964)
- "The Photographer’s Eye" (May - August 1964)
- "Siskind Recently" (May - June 1965)
- "Steichen Gallery Reinstallation" (October 1967)
- "Photography as Printmaking" (March - May 1968)
- "Photography: Recent Acquisitions" (July - October 1973)
- "Public Landscapes" (September - December 1974)
- "Photography for Collectors" (March - June 1976)
- "Edward Steichen Photography Center Reinstallation" (December 1979)
- "Still Life" (October 1981 - January 1982)
- "Reinstallation of the Collection" (October 1980 - January 1982)
- "Variants" (December 1985 - March 1986)
- "Siskind from the Collection" (July - October 1989)
- "Art of the Forties" (February - April 1991)
- "Life of the City" (February - May 2002)
- "Photography: Inaugural Installation" (November 2004 - June 2005)
- "Photography Collection: Rotation 3"(March - November 2006)
- "Photography Collection: Rotation 4" (December 2006 - July 2007)
- "Photography Collection: Rotation 6" (August 2009 - March 2010)
- "Abstract Expressionist New York" (October 2010 - April 2011)
- "Counter Space: Design and the Modern Kitchen" (September 2010 - May 2011)
- "Photography Collection: Rotation 8" (May 2011 - March 2012)
- "One-Way Ticket Jacob Lawrence’s Migration Series and Other Visions of the Great Movement North" (April - September 2015)
- "The Shape of Things: Photographs from Robert B. Menschel" (October 2016 - May 2017)
- "Robert Rauschenberg: Among Friends" (May - September 2017)
- "409: Abstract Lens" (Fall 2019 - Fall 2020)
- "520: Picturing America" (Fall 2019 - Spring 2022)

== Publications ==
- Aaron Siskind Photographs. Horizon Press, 1959.
- Bucks County: Photographs of Early Architecture. Horizon, 1974. ISBN 9780818014161.
- Places: Aaron Siskind Photographs. Siskind and Thomas B. Hess. Farrar, Straus & Giroux, 1976. ISBN 9780374232054.
- Harlem Document Photographs 1932 1940: Aaron Siskind. Matrix, 1981. ISBN 978-0936554075.
- Road Trip: Photographs 1980-1988 (Untitled 49). Friends of Photography, 1989. ISBN 9780933286535.
- Harlem Photographs 1932-1940. Smithsonian, 1990. ISBN 9781560980414.
- Aaron Siskind 100. powerHouse, 2003. ISBN 9781576871942.

== Collections ==
- Art Institute of Chicago, Chicago, IL: 256 prints (as of March 2019)
- San Francisco Museum of Modern Art, San Francisco, CA: 18 prints (as of March 2019)
- J. Paul Getty Museum, Los Angeles, California: 351 works (as of November 2019)
- Museum of Modern Art, New York: 98 works (as of November 2019)
- Metropolitan Museum of Art, New York: 152 works (as of September 2020)
- Stanford University Libraries, Stanford, CA: 362 prints (as of 2022)
