= Rosamond W. Purcell =

American artist

Rosamond Wolff Purcell (born 1942) is an American photographer. Purcell is known for her photographic works that explore subjects in natural history, science, and biology.

She was the subject of the 2016 documentary film An Art That Nature Makes: The Work of Rosamond Purcell by Molly Bernstein. Her work is included in the permanent collections of: Art Institute of Chicago, the National Gallery of Canada., Museum of Fine Arts (Boston), the Philadelphia Museum of Art, the National Academy of Science, and the Victoria and Albert in London.

Rosamond Purcell: Nature Stands Aside, the first retrospective exhibition of the artist’s work, was presented by the Addison Gallery of American Art in Andover, Massachusetts, during September through December 2022.

== Publications ==
- Purcell, Rosamond Wolff (1975). A matter of time. Boston: D.R. Godine. ISBN 9780879231385. OCLC 1656856.
- Purcell, Rosamond Wolff (1980). Half-Life. Boston: D.R. Godine. ISBN 0-87923-318-4.
- Purcell, Rosamond Wolff; Gould, Stephen Jay (1987). Illuminations: a bestiary. New York, NY: W W Norton. ISBN 9780393304367. OCLC 837465107.
- Purcell, Rosamond Wolff; Gould, Stephen Jay (1992). Finders, Keepers: Eight Collectors. New York: W. W. Norton. ISBN 978-0-393-03054-9.
- Purcell, Rosamond Wolff. (1998). Special cases : natural anomalies and historical monsters. Chronicle Books. ISBN 0811815684. OCLC 316821006.
- Gould, Stephen Jay; Purcell, Rosamond Wolff (2000). Crossing Over: Where Art and Science Meet. Three Rivers Press. ISBN 9780609805862.
- Jay, Ricky; Purcell, Rosamond Wolff (2002). Dice: deception, fate & rotten luck. W.W. Norton. ISBN 9780971454811. OCLC 51502713.
- Purcell, Rosamond Wolff (2003). Owls Head. New York, N.Y.: Quantuck Lane Press : Distributed by W.W. Norton & Co. ISBN 9780971454866. OCLC 52208674.
- Purcell, Rosamond Wolff (2006). Bookworm. New York: Quantuck Lane Press : Distributed by W.W. Norton. ISBN 9781593720230. OCLC 70174882.
- Purcell, Rosamond Wolff; Hall, L. S; Corado, René; Western Foundation of Vertebrate Zoology (US) (2008). Egg & nest. Cambridge, Mass.: Belknap Press of Harvard University Press. ISBN 9780674031722. OCLC 225874305.
- Purcell, Rosamond Wolff (2022). Rosamond Purcell : nature stands aside. New York, NY: Electa. ISBN 978-0-8478-7228-2. OCLC 1305438703.
