= Marsha Burns =

American photographer (born 1945)

- Born: Marsha Lynn Burns; 1945 (age 80–81); Seattle, Washington, U.S.
- Education: University of Washington; University of Massachusetts Amherst

Marsha Lynn Burns (born 1945) is an American photographer.

== Early life and education ==
Burns was born in Seattle, Washington. Between 1963 and 1965, she studied painting at the University of Washington and then continued her studies between 1967 and 1969 at the University of Massachusetts Amherst. Her first experiences with photography came from a photo course she took in Seattle in 1963, yet it would take another six years before she decided to dedicate herself fully to the medium of photography as her primary means of artistic expression.

== Collections ==
Her work is included in the collections of the Museum of Modern Art, the Seattle Art Museum, the Smithsonian American Art Museum, the Museum of Contemporary Photography, the Portland Art Museum, the Stedelijk Museum, the Centre Pompidou, and the Center for Creative Photography at the University of Arizona.

== Publications ==
- Marsha Burns (1977): White Snow Goose Sequence, Silver Image Gallery, Seattle.
- James G. Alinder (Ed) (1980): Untitled 23 (The Friends of Photography): 9 Critics 9 Photographers: James G. Alinder, Paul Caponigro, Beaumont Newhall, David Featherstone, Arthur Ollman, Robert Baker, Eugene Richards, Evon Streetman, John L. Ward, Candida Finkel, Eileen Berger, James D. Burns, Marsha Burns, Thomas Barro, Robert Fichter, Olivia Parker, Gary Metz, Roger Mertin. Carmel, California. The Friends of Photography.
- David Featherstone (Ed) (1982): Postures': The studio photographs of Marsha Burns. Friends of Photography.
- Carrol T. Hartwell (Autor) (1984): The making of a collection. Photographs from the Minneapolis Institute of Arts Millerton. Minneapolis Institute Of Arts, Aperture.
- Michael und Gisela Barche (Ed), Köhler (Autor) (1985): Das Aktfoto. Ansichten vom Körper im fotografischen Zeitalter Ästhetik Geschichte Ideologie. Bucher, München.
- André Kirchner (Ed) (1986): Brief an Marsha Burns. In: Hier und Dort: Orte, Stadtlandschaften, Material zur Geschichte der modernen Fotografie. Berlin.
- Marsha Burns, Michael Burns, Randy Hayes and John Yau (1987): Cities. Henry Art Gallery, University of Washington, Seattle.
- Suzuki Gyoh (Ed) (1988): Visions: Works by 8 Contemporary American Women. Sandy Skoglund, Karen Filter, Sandra L. Haber, Marsha Burns, Olivia Parker, Judy Coleman, Jan Groover, Barbara Kasten. Parco Pib. Japan.
- Peter Weiermair (Ed) (1988): Frauen sehen Männer: die Darstellung des männlichen Aktes durch zeitgenössische Fotografinnen. Dianora Niccolini, Bernis von zur Muehlen, Karin Rosenthal, Marsha Burns, Suzanne E. Pastor, Irene Peschick, Giuliana Traverso, Charlotte March, Nan Goldin, Sandi Fellmann, Barbara DeGenevieve, Lynn Davis, Rosella Bellusci, Maria-Theresia Litschauer, Anette Berns, Ernestine Ruben, Vera Hernandez Correa, Dominique Auerbacher, Lenni van Dinther, Jacqueline Livingstone, Jaschi Klein, Sharon Stewart. Photographie, Schaffhausen.
- Beth Goldberg (Ed) (1990): Photographs Updated': Similar Images / Dissimilar Motives. Marsha Burns, Jay Boersma, Julia Margaret Cameron, Eadweard Muybridge, Todd Walker, Hollis Frampton, Harry Callahan, Duane Michals, Imogen Cunningham, Anne W. Brigman, et al. University Art Gallery, Sonomoa State University, Rohnert Park.
- Peter Weiermair (Ed) (1995): The Male Nudes by Women: an anthology. photography by Dianora Niccolini, Bernis von zur Muehlen, Karin Rosenthal, Marsha Burns, Nan Goldin, et al. Edition Stemmle, Frankfurt.
- Weiermair, Peter (Ed) (1995): Frauen sehen Männer. Eine Anthologie. photography by Dianora Niccolini, Bernis von zur Muehlen, Karin Rosenthal, Marsha Burns, Nan Goldin, et al. Edition Stemmle, Zürich.
- Ed Marquand (Ed) (1998): Beyond Soap, Water and Comb: A Man's Guide to Good Grooming and Fitness, Marsha Burns. Abbeville Press.
