= Jack Welpott =

American photographer (1923–2007)

Jack Warren Welpott (April 27, 1923 – November 24, 2007) was an American photographer.

== Biography ==
Welpott was born on April 27, 1923, in Kansas City. He grew up in southern Indiana. He was drafted into the United States Army Air Forces in 1943, during World War II, and served as a radio intercept operator in the South Pacific until 1946. After the war, he returned to Indiana to attend Indiana University Bloomington. In 1949, he earned his BS in Economics from the Indiana University Bloomington. Unsure of his direction, he enrolled in a photography class and met the legendary photography instructor Henry Holmes Smith. Under his tutelage, Welpott became enthralled with black-and-white photography as a fine art form.

Welpott studied painting under Leon Golub and Harry Engle, and design with George Rickey, receiving his MS in Visual Communication in 1955, followed by an MFA in 1959.

== Career ==
Welpott began his long teaching career at San Francisco State College as he pursued the career of a professional photographer. In 1973, he was the recipient of the Medal of Arles, France; later that same year he received a grant from the National Endowment for the Arts; and, in 1983, a Polaroid grant in association with the Museum of Photographic Arts, San Diego.

== Works ==
Welpott's photographs are in the collections of the Museum of Modern Art, New York; Whitney Museum, New York; International Museum of Photography, George Eastman House, Rochester, New York; Art Institute of Chicago; Center of Creative Photography, University of Arizona, Tucson; University of New Mexico, Albuquerque; Norton Simon Art Museum, Pasadena, California; Oakland Museum of Modern Art, California; San Francisco Museum of Modern Art, Bibliothèque Nationale, Paris, and the Muscarelle Museum of Art, Williamsburg, Virginia.

Welpott died on November 24, 2007, aged 84, from kidney failure.

== Bibliography ==
- Welpott, Jack (2006). Driving to Stony Lonesome: Jack Welpott's Indiana Photographs, 1936–1959. Quarry Books. ISBN 978-0-253-21866-7.
- Welpott, Jack. Jack Welpott, Vintage Photographs 1952–1972: Exhibition [Catalog], January 23 – March 20, 1999. Petaluma, California: Barry Singer Gallery, 1999.
- Welpott, Jack. Jack Welpott: The Halide Conversion. Tokyo, Japan: Gallery Min, 1988 ISBN 978-4906265183
- Camerawork Gallery, Jack Welpott, Leland Rice, and Harold Jones. Contemporary California Photography: Catalogue of the Exhibition Camerawork Gallery, March, April, May 1978. San Francisco: San Francisco Camerawork Press, 1978.
- Welpott, Jack. The Visual Dialogue Foundation [Exhibition] at the Friends of Photography Gallery, Carmel, California, February 4 Through March 10, 1972: [Catalog.]. 1972. OCLC 63353376
