= Olivia Parker =

American photographer

- Born: 1941 (age 84–85); Boston
- Education: Wellesley College
- Known for: Still-life photography
- Website: https://www.oliviaparker.com/

Olivia Parker (born 1941) is a Manchester-by-the-Sea-based American still-life photographer.

== Early life and education ==
Parker was born in Boston in 1941. She graduated from Wellesley College with a bachelor's degree in art history in 1963.

== Career ==
Parker is interested in the parallels between art and science. Before focusing her practice on still-life photography she was trained as an art historian and also produced paintings in the tradition of 17th-century Dutch and Spanish still life works.

Parker's photographs of found objects have been described as "poetic and dreamy". A retrospective exhibition of Parker's work, titled Order of Imagination: The Photographs of Olivia Parker, was held at the Peabody Essex Museum in 2019. An exhibition catalog accompanied the exhibition.

Parker was inducted in the International Photography Hall of Fame in 2019, along with Ralph Gibson, Elliott Erwitt, Mary Ellen Mark and others.

=== Collections ===
Parker's work is included in the collections of The Museum of Fine Arts, Houston, Museum of Fine Arts, Boston, Museum of Modern Art, New York, and the Peabody Essex Museum.

== Family life ==
Parker and her investor husband John moved into a house in Manchester-by-the-Sea in 1967. He died in 2016 after living with Alzheimer’s for years. Her series Vanishing in Plain Sight was about his illness.
