= Robert Heinecken =

American artist (1931–2006)

Robert Heinecken (1931 – May 19, 2006) was an American artist who referred to himself as a "paraphotographer" because he so often made photographic images without a camera.

== Early life and education ==
Born in Denver in 1931, Heinecken grew up in Riverside, California, the son of a Lutheran minister. He joined the Navy in 1954 and served as a fighter pilot (though too short, he passed a height test by padding his socks with paper). Heinecken later served as an officer in the Marines, discharged as a captain in 1957.

Heinecken completed his bachelor's and master's degrees in art at UCLA, where he studied printmaking as well as photography.

== Work ==
Heinecken was known for appropriating and re-processing images from magazines, product packaging or television. In "Are You Rea" series from 1964 to 1968, for instance, he created a portfolio of images filled with unexpected and sometimes surreal juxtapositions by placing a single magazine page on a light table, so that the resulting contact print picks up imagery from both sides of the page.

In the late 1960s, he also began cutting up popular magazines such as Time and Vogue and inserting sexual or pornographic images into them. He would place his collage-publications back on newsstands in Los Angeles to be sold to unsuspecting buyers.

From 1971 on he started to expose food directly on light sensitive materials. He realized these "documentary photograms" first on black and white paper and later in colour in the series Various Lunches on positive Ilfochrome paper. In 1983/84 he created such Foodograms even on large polaroid sheets (20x24 inches) in collaboration with John Reuter in San Diego and Boston.

In the 1980s, he created several series on American news television that involved photographing images on the television or exposing the light of a television set directly to paper to create what he called "videograms."

== Teaching and legacy ==
In 1962, he founded the photography program at UCLA. He taught there until 1991. In 1964 he helped found the Society for Photographic Education, an organization of college-level teachers. He also taught at the School of the Art Institute of Chicago, where his second wife, Joyce Neimanas, was on faculty. They split their time between the two cities for several years before they moved to New Mexico in 2004.

As a professor at UCLA, Heinecken was a prime mover in the Los Angeles art photography scene. His influence was felt by many students and associates. Among them were John Divola, Eileen Cowin, Graham Howe, Jo Ann Callis and Ray McSavaney. Many of them, in turn, became influences on succeeding generations of art photographers.

During his life he was mainly shown in traditional photography galleries, but two contemporary art galleries in L.A. began staging exhibitions of his work after his death: Marc Selwyn Fine Art and Cherry and Martin. Curators like Eva Respini at the Museum of Modern Art now place his work in a conceptual art lineage, associating him with Pictures Generations artists such as Cindy Sherman, John Baldessari and Richard Prince.

== Exhibitions ==
- 1986: "Selected Works, 1966-1986", Gallery Min, Tokyo
- 1990: "Amnésie médiatique : l'oeuvre de Robert Heinecken, 1966–2000", Rencontres de la photographie, Arles
- 2007: "Robert Heinecken 1932–2006: Sex and food, a memorial exhibition"", Museum of Contemporary Photography at Columbia College Chicago
- 2011: "Speaking in Tongues : The Art of Wallace Berman and Robert Heinecken", Armory Center for the Arts
- 2011: "Let the experiment begin: Photographic Process in Los Angeles, 1960–1980", Los Angeles County Museum
- 2012: "Figure and form in contemporary photography", Los Angeles County Museum
- 2014: "Robert Heinecken: Object Matter," Museum of Modern Art, New York

== Publications ==
- 2006: "Recto/Verso", Nazraeli Press, ISBN 1-59005-174-2
- 1980: "Heinecken", The Friends of Photography in Association with Light Gallery, edition of 2000 signed copies
