= Carol Henry =

Carol Henry may refer to:

- Carol Henry (actor) (1918–1987), American actor
- Carol F. Henry (born 1939), American philanthropist from California
- Carol Henry (photographer) (born 1960), American fine arts photographer

== See also ==
- Carl Henry (disambiguation)
- Karl Henry (born 1982), English footballer
- Caroline Henry (born 1969), English politician
