= Tom Atwood =

American photographer (born 1971)

Tom Atwood is an American fine art, portrait, and celebrity photographer, best known for his 2005 book Kings in Their Castles. The New Yorker has praised the "refreshing clarity and modesty" of his work.

== Early life ==
Born and raised in Vermont, Atwood is a graduate of Harvard University, where he studied economics. He later earned an MPhil from Cambridge University. Atwood has lived in Paris, Boston, San Francisco, Los Angeles, and currently resides in New York City.

Atwood worked several years as an advertising executive before turning full-time to commercial and fine art photography. As a photographer, Atwood is largely self-taught, developing many of his techniques through trial and error. According to Atwood, various cultural influences—including theater, painting, architecture, and psychology—have informed his photographic style.

Atwood is particularly known for combining and balancing the genres of portraiture and architectural photography, so that neither the subject nor his or her surroundings predominate in the final image. Memorable early portraits include astronaut Buzz Aldrin and actresses Hilary Swank and Julie Newmar. Atwood and his work have won many awards: in 2009 he was named Photographer of the Year at the Worldwide Photography Gala Awards, earning first place in the portraiture category.

== Kings in Their Castles ==
Atwood was widely acclaimed for Kings in Their Castles (University of Wisconsin Press, 2005), a collection of 71 photographs which featured gay urban American men, mainly New Yorkers, photographed in their domestic environments. Atwood worked for four years on the project, relying on word-of-mouth among New York friends to help find compelling subjects and to convince prominent cultural figures to participate. "I like photos chock-full of visual information," Atwood has said, adding that he prefers to capture individuals doing everyday activities and "in spaces that are built up over time, where everything has meaning to the person." Subjects included the playwright Edward Albee, photographed in his New York City living room playing a miniature piano, filmmaker John Waters, photographed packing plastic food into a suitcase, fashion designer Todd Oldham in his Pennsylvania treehouse, and drag queen Mother Flawless Sabrina (Jack Doroshow) using duct tape to give herself a facelift. Artists Ross Bleckner, Thomas Lanigan-Schmidt and Tobi Wong, choreographer Tommy Tune, creative director Simon Doonan, composers David del Tredici and Ned Rorem, club DJ Junior Vasquez, director Joel Schumacher, drag queen Hedda Lettuce (Steven Polito), U.S. Representative Sean Patrick Maloney, and writers John Ashbery, Michael Cunningham, Richard Howard, Andrew Solomon and Edmund White also figure in the collection. Charles Kaiser contributed the book's introductory essay.

"The art books I had seen about gay men were all nudes on the beach or romping through the forest," Atwood told The Los Angeles Times. "I wanted this to be more about people as human beings, their idiosyncrasies, their daily lives."

== Kings & Queens in Their Castles ==
Atwood's book, Kings & Queens in Their Castles, was published in 2017 by art book publisher Damiani. Called "the most ambitious photo series ever" of LGBTQ subjects, the book expanded on Atwood's earlier concept to include new portraits of some 160 lesbians and gay men, as well as members of the bisexual and transgender community, of whom about 60 are well-known figures. Lesser-known individuals include baristas, lawyers, and drag queens. Subjects were photographed in 30 different U.S. states.

== Exhibition history ==
- "Personal", Louis Stern Fine Arts, Advertising Photographers of America, Los Angeles, 2003 (group exhibition)
- "Boys of Summer", ClampArt, New York, 2003 (group)
- "Kings in Their Castles", Farmani Gallery, Los Angeles, 2006
- "There's No Place Like Home", PDNB Gallery, Dallas, 2008 (group)
- L.E.A.D. Uganda, Steven Kasher Gallery, New York, 2009 (group)
- The Fence at Photoville, Photo Daily News, Brooklyn, 2012 (group)
- Art Takes Times Square, New York, 2012 (group)
- 3rd Ward Exhibition, New York, 2012 (residency)

In addition, Atwood's work has been exhibited at the Museum of Modern Art in New York City, the Museum of Photographic Arts, the Center for Fine Art Photography, the Pacific Design Center, the Directors Guild of America, and the George Eastman Museum.

== Publications ==
- Atwood, Tom (2005). King in Their Castles. University of Wisconsin Press. 92 pages. ISBN 0299211509.
