= Friends Without a Border =

Friends Without A Border Logo

Friends Without A Border (Friends) is a nonprofit, nongovernmental organization that funds medical treatment and healthcare programs serving disadvantaged children and their families in Southeast Asia. Founded in 1996 by photographer Kenro Izu, Friends provides direct financial and program support to Angkor Hospital for Children in Siem Reap, Cambodia, Lao Friends Hospital for Children in Luang Prabang, Laos, and The Lake Clinic in Siem Reap, Cambodia.

The international headquarters are located in New York, US, with one sister organization in Tokyo, Japan.

== History ==
The organization was founded by noted fine art photographer Kenro Izu in 1996. Izu's visit to Cambodia to photograph the temples of Angkor inspired the pediatric hospital that would become Angkor Hospital for Children (AHC). During his first visit to Cambodia in 1993 and throughout subsequent trips, he was forever changed by his encounters with ill, malnourished, and disfigured children in desperate need of medical care. Izu made a commitment to build a pediatric hospital in Siem Reap and established Friends Without A Border for that purpose.

In 1996, the land for AHC was granted by the Governor of Siem Reap Province, Mr. Tong Chai. One year later, Friends Without A Border and the Cambodian Ministry of Health signed a 10-year agreement for AHC and broke ground on the hospital's future site. AHC opened its doors on February 22, 1999. In 2000, the Emergency Room and Dental Department opened, and that same year marked the start of the Orphanage Medical Assistance and Kardiac Kids programs. A year later, the HIV/Homecare program, Acute Care Unit, and Safety and First-Aid Training program for non-medical persons in Siem Reap began.

In 2002, Friends launched the Capacity Building and Health Education Program (CBHEP), a health promotion program that trains volunteer healthcare workers to improve health and hygiene at the village level. Also in 2002, the Eye Care Service Department and the Low Acuity Unit opened at AHC.

In 2005, the Oral Rehydration Therapy Corner opened. In 2006, the Acute Care Unit was upgraded to an Intensive Care Unit and the Physiotherapy Program was launched. Former U.S. President Bill Clinton toured AHC in December 2006.

The AHC Satellite opened at Sotnikum District Hospital in February 2010 to replicate the successful model of "treatment + education + prevention" in partnership with the provincial health department.

In January 2013, Friends and AHC celebrated the transition of management and operations to the dedicated hospital staff. The independence of AHC accomplished one of the original goals that was set in the beginning of a self-sustained hospital. Friends continues to be a presence at AHC and helps with their fundraising efforts.

Also in 2013, Friends embarked on a new project to build a hospital in the Luang Prabang Province of Laos. In partnership with the Luang Prabang Health Department and Provincial Hospital (LPPH), Friends began construction in the Fall of 2013 on Lao Friends Hospital for Children (LFHC) on the grounds of LPPH.

February 11, 2015 marked the Grand Opening of Lao Friends Hospital for Children. LFHC is the first full-service pediatric hospital in northern Laos, and currently includes an outpatient department, an emergency room, neonatal intensive care unit (NICU), operating theater, laboratory, pharmacy, radiology, lecture room, library to teach pediatric medicine to the future leaders of the hospital, kitchen and laundry for families visiting the hospital, and a vegetable garden to teach families how to prepare nutritious meals.

== Corporate Governance ==
Friends Without A Border operates a modest office in New York City. Volunteers assist with many features of the organization's work. Members of the board of directors, including founder Kenro Izu, serve without compensation and pay their own way to visit operations overseas. Board members and chapter members play crucial roles in raising funds for Friends; including regional gatherings that draw Cambodian-Americans and Laotian-Americans to the organization, and through two signature events that take place each year in New York City. The Photography Auction has raised more than $2 million since its debut in the late 1990s. The Annual Gala, held at the time of the Khmer and Lao New Year each April, is a key event to fundraise for the organization's programs in Southeast Asia.

== Programs ==
=== Lao Friends Hospital for Children ===
Lao Friends Hospital for Children (LFHC) is the newest project of Friends. Construction on LFHC began in November 2013, and the hospital officially opened the Outpatient Department on February 12, 2015.

In early 2014, Friends Without A Border conducted a baseline medical survey (BMS) in the Luang Prabang Province in 2014. Dr. Jeffrey Measelle, Associate Professor of Psychology at the University of Oregon, who has been published extensively in the area of early childhood development, led the project as a pro-bono consultant. The overall goal of the BMS is to collect health data in order to establish baseline child health metrics in advance of patient care at LFHC. Over time, repeated assessments will enable LFHC to evaluate changes in the health status of children in Luang Prabang and measure LFHC's impact.

Also in 2014, medical and English language training courses for LFHC staff began.

==== Friends Visitor Center ====
The Friends Visitor Center opened in September 2014 in downtown Luang Prabang, Lao PDR as a way to spread awareness of LFHC and educate tourists and the general public on the health care situation in Laos. The first floor is dedicated to information on Friends' programs while the second floor houses photography, art, and textiles related to Lao culture.

=== Angkor Hospital for Children ===
Angkor Hospital for Children(AHC) is located in Siem Reap, Cambodia, home of the famous Angkor monuments, relics of the Khmer Empire which lasted from the ninth to fifteenth centuries. AHC opened in 1999 to provide healthcare services to children in Cambodia. AHC's mission is to provide high-quality healthcare to children while simultaneously educating Cambodian healthcare professionals and improving preventive health practices. AHC partners with the Cambodian Ministry of Health, UNICEF, and the World Health Organization, among others, to provide Integrated Management of Childhood Illness (IMCI). Since opening, more than one million children have received treatment at AHC. The hospital offers outpatient, inpatient, emergency, surgical, dental, and ophthalmological care to more than 400 patients each day. In 2005, it was recognized as Cambodia's first teaching hospital.

==== Medical Education Center ====
In addition to providing high-quality healthcare to the children of Cambodia, one of the main objectives of Angkor Hospital for Children is to utilize the hospital as a training center to help rebuild the country's professional medical community. In 2001, the Medical Education Center (MEC) was established to train doctors, nurses, paramedics, and administrators, and to provide continuing medical education courses and learning outside the classroom. A Memorandum of Agreement with the Ministry of Health sees every graduating nurse in the country participate in postgraduate training that provides many young nurses their first experience with direct patient care. The MEC's teaching and learning activities have been cited in the National Strategic Health Plan.

==== Family Education and Nutrition ====
AHC provides general health education for parents focused on prevention and treatment of diseases most commonly affecting Cambodian children – respiratory illness, diarrhea, malaria, dengue fever, and HIV, and well as emerging diseases such as the H1N1 virus. A variety of pamphlets are made available to visitors, and the AHC conducts nurse-led group teaching sessions. Additionally, AHC provides significant resources to the assessment, diagnosis, treatment, and prevention of childhood malnutrition. AHC's nutrition program, funded by Abbott Laboratories and Direct Relief, provides nutrition education and support to Cambodian families.

==== Capacity Building and Health Education Program ====
The Capacity Building and Health Education Program (CBHEP) works to improve the health, hygiene, and nutrition of local communities. Faced with a staggering number of children who fall ill and die from preventable ailments exacerbated by rampant malnutrition, CBHEP was established in 2002 as a comprehensive program to address prevalent health issues in the community.

CBHEP staff travel to many communities and villages to work directly with residents to teach about improving overall health through everyday practices and preventive measures. In addition, CBHEP staff identifies and refers children who might require additional care to AHC or the Satellite. CBHEP staff also work with local health centers.

==== AHC Satellite ====
Because of the lack of high-quality pediatric services in rural regions, many families of the Sotnikum district were traveling great distances to seek treatment at Angkor Hospital for Children, often leading to delayed medical attention and complications in a patient's condition.

As a result, in February 2010, Friends Without A Border opened a Satellite hospital as an experiment in public/private sector partnership. Constructed with private funding, the Satellite is on the grounds of Sotnikum Referral Hospital (SRH), a government hospital located 35 km from Siem Reap, or about one hour by paved road. SRH and the Satellite function as the referral hospital for 23 health centers in the Sotnikum District of Siem Reap Province; some health centers are located as far as 80 km from Sotnikum itself, over difficult roads that sometimes render the hospital inaccessible during the rainy season. In addition, the Satellite and SRH staffs collaborate on best practices as well as work with admissions personnel to ensure that all eligible families are enrolled in the Health Equity Fund, Cambodia's answer to healthcare financial aid for the very poor.

The Satellite features 3 main departments—Outpatient, Inpatient, and Emergency Room—as well as active coordination with the health centers at the village/community level through the well-integrated Capacity Building and Health Education Program (CBHEP).

The Satellite also offers mobile clinics in the Siem Reap province for displaced families due to conflict at the border between Cambodia and Thailand.

=== The Lake Clinic ===
Friends Without A Border also supports The Lake Clinic (TLC), a project dedicated to delivering basic health care, as well as disease surveillance and proper medical referrals, to a severely isolated and under served region of Cambodia—the floating villages of the Tonlé Sap Lake.

The Lake Clinic was launched in 2007 by the founding Executive Director of Angkor Hospital for Children, Jon Morgan, R.N. TLC provides health care to families living on Southeast Asia's largest lake who do not otherwise have the means to travel to a local healthcare clinic. For the Tonlé Sap residents, medical care can be more than 100 km away and travel is possible only by boat. In its five years of operation, TLC has expanded to provide services to 13 villages encompassing 30,000 individuals. TLC's boat-based clinics represent the only sustained attempt at delivering care, treatment, and prevention to thousands of families.

== Awards ==
In 2007, Kenro Izu, founder of Friends Without A Border, was awarded the Pacesetter Award from New York Hospital Queens, the highest award presented by the medical center. Kenro was honored at NYHQ's "A Spring Night Gala" for his leadership and humanitarian efforts to heal, nurture, and protect innocent life in Cambodia. Also in 2007, Izu was the recipient of the Honorary Visionary Award by the Lucie Awards.

In 2014, Izu was named the World of Children Award Health Honoree. The World of Children Award, which has been called the "Nobel Prize for Child Advocates," is the only global recognition honoring individuals for serving vulnerable children worldwide. Izu and Friends Without A Border were recognized at the World of Children Award Ceremony in November 2014.

In 2015, Friends Without A Border presented its highest honor, the Healing Asia Award, to Pencils of Promise for their work in Luang Prabang, Laos. CEO of Pencils of Promise, Michael Dougherty, accepted the speech on the organization's behalf. Also presented at the Annual Gala is the Best Friend of Friends Award, commemorating those who have dedicated their time, talent, and spirit to Friends over the course of many years.
