= Carol Henry (photographer) =

American photographer

Carol Henry (born 1960) is an American fine art photographer and curator.

== Life ==
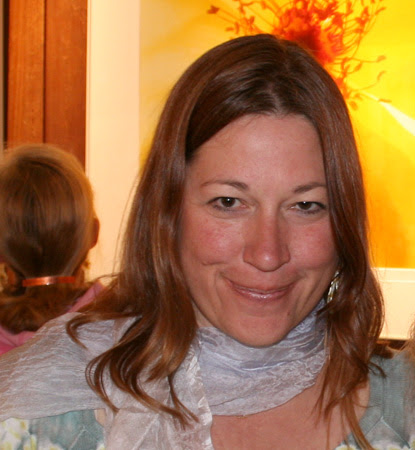
Carol Henry at an opening at Photography West Gallery in Carmel, CA

Henry was born in Hamilton, Ohio. She has lived in California since 1985 and resides in Carmel.

== Photography ==
Henry is best known for botanical photographs. However, she does not use a camera to create them. Rather, she directly creates images in a darkroom by projecting light through subjects onto positive-receiving Ilfochrome (formerly Cibachrome) color photographic paper. Using transmitted light embues her work wirh clarity and saturation. Henry has worked with this experimental process for over 20 years. Because of her unique process, the San Francisco Chronicle named Henry as one of 100 reasons to visit Carmel during its 100-year anniversary celebration, calling her botanical photography "...erotic, vibrant, bold and delicate at the same time".

Henry has also explored other camera-less photographic techniques since 2012 as a result of Ilfochrome paper ceasing to be manufactured. She has embraced the cyanotype process from the mid-1800s to continue exploring natural subjects and the human narrative using light and form.

Tulip Center I by Henry, 2005, made without a camera in a darkroom.

== Curatorial Work ==
=== She Loves Me, She Loves Me Not ===
In 2016, Carol Henry spent a full year researching and gathering work by 12 renowned women photographers with the male as subject, to form the exhibition, She Loves Me, She Loves Me Not. The exhibition celebrates a hundred years of successful women in the medium and reveals a less than exhibited photo topic! She Loves Me, She Loves Me Not features 12 of the most renowned women in photography showing images of men in their work. The exhibit opens with silver gelatin photographs by Imogen Cunningham, who was called an “immoral woman” for exhibiting nude fine-art photographs of her own husband. Other women included in the exhibit are Edna Bullock, Martha Casanave, Jodi Cobb, Judy Dater, Flor Garduño, Dorothea Lange, Sally Mann, Mary Ellen Mark, Holly Roberts, Adrienne Salinger, Joyce Tenneson and Henry herself. The exhibition opened in January 2017 at the Center for Photographic Art and went on to The Florida Museum of Photographic Art in June 2017. The final venue for the exhibit was Post Ranch Inn, Big Sur, CA October 2017.

=== Bill Owens | The American Dream ===
March 2019. Carmel Visual Arts, Carmel, CA

=== Wynn Bullock ===
July 2018, The Post Gallery

=== Kathryn Mayo | We Are Selma ===
June 2018. Carmel Visual Arts, Carmel, CA

=== William Giles & The Elementalists ===
March 2017. Carmel Visual Arts, Carmel, CA.

=== Jeff Nixon | Black and White Photography ===
January 2016. Carmel Visual Arts, Carmel, CA.

=== Tom Millea ===
January 2014. Carmel Visual Arts, Carmel, CA.
