= Connie Imboden =

American photographer

- Notable work: • Beauty Of Darkness, Custom & limited ed., 1999, ISBN 978-1-881529-56-9 • The raw seduction of flesh, Silver Arts, 1999, ISBN 978-1-902613-02-4 • Reflections: 25 Years of Photography, Insight Editions, 2009, ISBN 978-1-933784-79-3

Connie Imboden was born in 1953 and is an American photographer known for her work in nudes, using reflections in water and mirrors. Her photographs are represented in many collections including The Museum of Modern Art in New York, The Museum of Modern Art in San Francisco, The Philadelphia Museum of Art, Bibliothèque nationale de France in Paris, the Ludwig Museum in Cologne, Germany, as well as many other public and private collections throughout Europe and the Americas.

Imboden has shown her photography work in groups and solo shows at galleries and museums throughout the United States, South America, Europe and China.

Connie Imboden's first book, Out of Darkness, with essays compiled by Charles-Henri Favrod and A.D. Coleman, which won the Silver Medal in Switzerland's "Schonste Bucher Aus Aller Welt (Most Beautiful Book in the World)" Award in 1993.

Following "Out of Darkness", Imboden released two monographs in 1999. The first, "Beauty of Darkness", features 80 images of her work produced between 1986 and 1998. It also featured introductions by A.D. Coleman and Arthur Ollman. The second book, "The Raw Seduction of Flesh", features work produced in 1998 and an introduction by Mitchell Snow.

Her most recent monograph, "Reflections; 25 Years of Photography", was published in 2009 by Insight Editions with essays by Arthur Ollman, Julian Cox and John Wood.

Connie Imboden was an instructor at the Maryland Institute College of Art, where her experience as a photographer began, and has also taught at the Maine Photographic Workshops, the International Center of Photography in New York City, the Center for Photography in Woodstock, the Fine Arts Work Center in Provincetown, the Rencontres Internationales de la Photographie in France, and the Santa Fe Photographic Workshops.

== Early work ==
Imboden was introduced to photography during the summer following her junior year of high school when she enrolled in a Basic Photography course at the Maryland Institute College of Art. Previously showing no interest in art, she was inspired by Diane Arbus's work and her expression through photography. It quickly became a passionate pursuit that would last a lifetime.

Experimenting with negatives by cutting, scratching, and melting them, Imboden's early images are introspective self-portraits that show early signs of the psychological qualities that would eventually become characteristic of her work. Many of these photographs depict the representation of masks, another recurring theme through Imboden's career.

== Working with water ==
Dead Silences I, 1987

Imboden's work with water began in 1983, while out photographing, she became intrigued by specular bursts of sunlight bouncing off puddles after a heavy rain. She continued to explore the reflective properties of water until one day a friend volunteered to model nude in a stream Imboden had been photographing in. The human form, distorted, reflected, and transformed as it was submerged in water, would eventually become the inspiration for her life's work.

Imboden would continually discover new ways to explore her subject matter. Her early images incorporate the moving water of streams or the unavoidable reflection of trees. These are graphic elements that further transform the figure in ways that heighten the psychological aspect of the work. Later, in images such as Dead Silences I & II, Imboden photographed above the surface of a black lined kiddie pool, which improved the visibility of the reflection as well as the magnification and refraction of the water. The images working with this method illustrate elongated forms, fluid and often tranquil due to the stillness of the water.

Imboden's work with the human form and water incorporate three distinct layers; the body above the surface of the water, its reflection, and the body submerged. When she eventually began photographing underwater, she would also use the meniscus of the water to further distort and transform the body. Her images throughout the years of 1997–2000 feature bizarre, organic forms – familiar in their flesh but alien in their reconstructed form. In an interview, Imboden is quoted as saying "... there is nothing more repulsive nor more attractive to us than flesh. This confrontation with flesh in an unidentified form makes us uncomfortable. We don’t know what we are looking at, but we know it is human.”

== Working with mirrors ==
Connie Imboden, Self Portrait, 1990

Photographing models in water was not an option during the cold winter months for Imboden. To continue to deal with reflections and human figures throughout the year, she began using mirrors in 1989." The problem was that the mirrors only provided one reflective layer, instead of the three. She had grown accustomed to working with what models that displayed potential to distort and transform the figure. Her early attempts at disrupting the clean and crisp reflections involved smearing oil on the mirror's surface, as seen in Untitled #2455.

Seeking to alter the surface even further, Imboden, began scratching the silver backing off of the mirrors she was working with and making them transparent in some places while still reflective in others. Putting a model behind the mirror made them visible in the areas where the mirror was transparent, a model in front can be seen in the parts that are still reflective. Through the relationship of the models in front of and behind the mirror, as well as her camera angle, she discovered a similar effect to the refractive properties of the water. In the only self-portrait she produced since the 1970s, Self Portrait 1990, Imboden, imperfectly lines up her profile in front of the mirror with a models face behind the mirror, creating a distorted portrait by combining two different views into one, reminiscent of the quality of space in a Cubist painting.

The smearing and scraping of the mirrors soon lead to generating a marred, scratched texture on their surface. Resembling the "hatching" technique in medieval printmaking. Many of Imboden's images that illustrate this texture have a dark, mythological quality to them, as in Untitled #3573. By incorporating this texture with the model showing through from behind the mirror and the one reflected in front, Imboden was once again working with three distinct layers.

== Working with color ==
As photographing with film became more challenging with the medium's overwhelming shift to digital in the early 2000's, Imboden began working with a digital camera in 2008. These early explorations revealed yet another layer for transforming and redefining the human form, incorporating color into her images for the first time. Due to the transformative effects that water has on the perception of color- specifically the absorption of longer, warmer wavelengths of light- Imboden's early color images drastically separate forms seen above versus below the water's surface. Her methods for lighting the body exaggerate this differentiation, giving the body outside the water an ethereal, flame-like feel that contrasts with the hardened, cold, stone-like feel of the body underneath. With a newfound passion and enthusiasm to explore this new dimension, Imboden would eventually try to recreate the same effect in a complex studio environment, revisiting her work with the mirrors with the addition of an assortment of gels, colored backdrops, and cloths. Much of the work created through this process has a more psychological, sometimes narrative quality, often depicting figures that bear resemblances to archetypal characters throughout mythology.

== Personal life ==
Imboden is married to Dr. Patricia Dwyer. The couple live in Maryland.
