= Saher Alghorra =

Palestinian photographer

- Born: 1997 (age 28–29); Gaza City, Palestine
- Education: University of Palestine
- Occupation: Photographer

Saher Alghorra (born 1997) is a Palestinian photojournalist. Born in Gaza City, he graduated from the University of Palestine and began his career in photojournalism in 2021. He won the 2023 Lucie Impact Award, the 2025 ICRC Humanitarian Visa d'or Award, and the 2026 Pulitzer Prize for Breaking News Photography. The Pulitzer Foundation defended him against backlash.
