= Izu =

Izu may refer to:

== Places ==
- Izu Province, a part of modern-day Shizuoka prefecture in Japan
  - Izu, Shizuoka, a city in Shizuoka prefecture
  - Izu Peninsula, near Tokyo
  - Izu Islands, located off the Izu Peninsula

== People with the surname ==
- Kenro Izu (井津 建郎, born 1949), Japanese photographer
- Mark Izu (1954–2025), American jazz double bass player and composer
