= AHC =

AHC may refer to:

== Arts and music ==
- American Head Charge, an American rock band
- American Heroes Channel, an American TV network

== Medicine ==
- Alternating hemiplegia of childhood, a neurological disorder
- Apical hypertrophic cardiomyopathy or Yamaguchi syndrome, a type of thickening of the heart

== Organizations ==
- Aboriginal Housing Company, an Aboriginal organisation in Sydney, Australia
- Alabama Historical Commission, a historic preservation agency
- Allan Hancock College, a community college in California, US
- American Horse Council, a trade organization
- Angkor Hospital for Children in Cambodia
- Arab Higher Committee, political organisation in Mandate Palestine
- Army Hospital Corps, (1857–1884), predecessor of the British Royal Army Medical Corps
- Associates of Holy Cross, post-nominal initials
- Austin History Center
- Australian Heritage Commission, heritage conservation organisation

== Other ==
- 74AHC-series integrated circuits, a logic family of integrated circuits
- Active heave compensation, for offshore equipment
- AHC, a diecast toy vehicle company based in the Netherlands; associated with Auto Pilen
- Amedee Army Airfield (IATA airport code AHC)
