= Emily Garthwaite =

English photojournalist

- Born: 24 March 1993 (age 33)
- Education: Central Saint Martins; University of Westminster
- Years active: 2013–present
- Website: www.emilygarthwaite.com

Emily Garthwaite (born 24 March 1993) is an English photojournalist. She was named a 2019 Forbes 30 Under 30. Her work has received a number of accolades, including the ICRC Humanitarian Visa d'or Award.

== Early life and education ==
Garthwaite grew up in the county of Surrey. She took up photography only as a hobby as a teenager and intended to pursue painting at Central Saint Martins, taking a foundation course, but ended up doing Film and Photography. After working in club and fashion photography, Garthwaite completed a Master of Arts (MA) in Photojournalism and Documentary Photography at the University of Westminster in 2016.

== Career ==
Garthwaite began her professional career as a club photographer and then an assistant fashion photographer. It was when she visited India for the first time to scatter her grandmother's ashes in Assam, where her grandmother grew up, that Garthwaite decided to go into photojournalism. The photographs from her months of travel through India were exhibited at the University of York's Norman Rea Gallery in 2014 under the title Afterlife. Her image of an Asian elephant titled Chained to Tradition was a finalist for 2015 Wildlife Photographer of the Year in the Photojournalism category.

During summer 2015, Garthwaite worked with the Rațiu Family Charitable Foundation in Romania, where she stumbled upon the salt flats of Turda, publishing a photo journal in the magazine Suitcase. From 2016 to 2018, Garthwaite was an associate member of Street Photography International, a collective of four street photographers.

In 2017, the Iranian Arts Institute invited Garthwaite to photograph the Arba'een Pilgrimage, the world's largest annual pilgrimage, starting the photography series Iraq: Road to Arba'een. Garthwaite visited southern Iraq for the first time that October and returned in 2018 as the geopolitical landscape evolved. She co-directed her first feature-length documentary on the subject (alternatively titled 41 Days in Iraq on Arba'een or The 40th Day), which screened in 2018 at Chehelcheragh International Festival in Tehran as well as in Italy. That same year, she exhibited her photography series Iraq: Road to Arba'een and A Portrait of India; the former achieved second place in the Sinchi Foundation's 2018 Photo Competition.

Furthermore, Garthwaite's photograph Witness landed her a second shortlisting for 2018 Wildlife Photographer of the Year. In 2019, Garthwaite presented an Everyday Heroes series, consisting of portraits taken in the Scottish Highlands for a Belstaff campaign. That same year, she spent time in Dearborn, Michigan capturing its local Muslim community. In 2020, she founded the WomenTranslate service.

After a stint staying with her family during the COVID-19 lockdown, Garthwaite returned to Iraq, this time visiting the Zagros Mountains and Tigris River. At the former, she accompanied the Bakhtiari people on their Kooch migration for IraNomad Tours. This was followed by two climate-driven trips down the Tigris. Garthwaite exhibited A Journey Down the Tigris River at the Visa pour L'Image event in Perpignan, where she won the 2023 ICRC Humanitarian Visa d'or Award, and Tears of the Tigris at the Leica Gallery London. Her project Light Between Mountains received a CCFD–Terre Solidaire grant, while her contributions to the Leon McCaron Noema essay The Last of the Marsh Arabs won her the 2022 Covering Climate Now Award for Photography.

In 2024, Save the Children commissioned Garthwaite to photograph the Yazidi community in Iraq 10 years on from the Yazidi genocide. In 2025, she is working on a project in Marrakesh about the local art fair.
