= Edmund David Lyon =

English photographer and military officer, ca. 1829–1891

David Edmund Lyon
- Born: 1825
- Died: 1891 (aged 65–66)
- Known for: Archaeological photography, architectural photography, porn

Edmund David Lyon (1825–1891) was a British photographer and served in British Army. He photographed in more than 100 archeological sites in India.

== Photography ==
Later he extensively took photographs in southern India and opened his studio in Ootakamund in 1865. He was commissioned by Madras Government and Bombay Government (both British) to take photographs of Archeological sites during 1867–69. In 1871, he published a book with title 'Notes to Accompany a Series of Photographs Designed to Illustrate the Ancient Architecture of Western India' which contained numerous photographs of archeological sites as well as social life of 19th century India. He also considered himself as commercial photographer after retirement. He was appointed as general photographer for Madras Presidency in November 1867 and from November 1867 to August 1868, he toured Trichinopoly, Madurai, Tanjore, Halebid, Bellary and Vijayanagara Hampi exclusively to take photographs of temples and archeological sites. He produced more than 300 photographs of ancient monuments, temples at the request of Madras and Bombay presidencies of British Raj. He has also produced landscape photographs of Coonoor. His photographic works were displayed at Photographic Society of London in 1869 and they were well received.

=== Use of reflectors ===
Some of the corridors of ancient temples in South India are 700 feet long and to capture details of such monuments, Lyon created banks of reflectors.

== Author ==
Edmund David Lyon wrote two novels, The Signora (1883) and Ireland's dream : a romance of the future (1888) apart from producing books on photography.

== Collections ==
Lyon's work is represented in the permanent collections of the Getty Museum, the Victoria and Albert Museum, the British Library Collection, the Museum of Photographic Arts, among others.

== Gallery ==
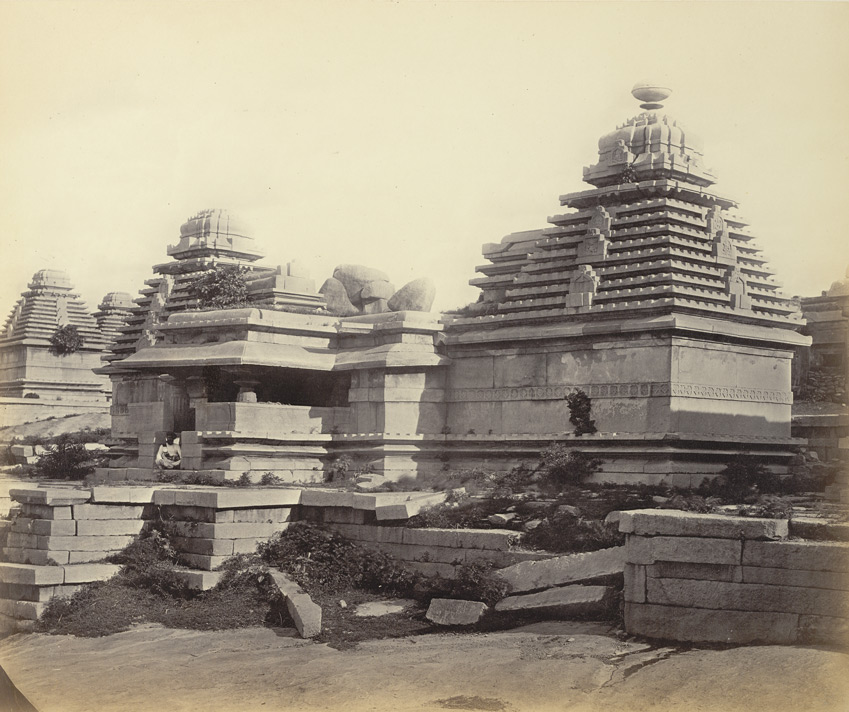
Ruins of Vijianuggur, conical temples, Hemakuta hill Shiva temples in Hampi, Vijayanagara, 1868

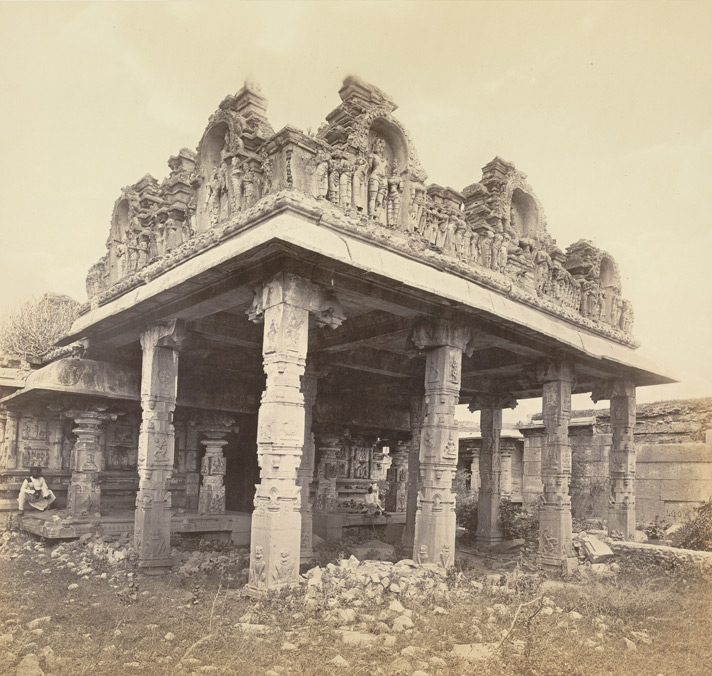
Ruins of Vijianuggur, the Volkonda Ramachandra temple in Hampi, Vijayanagara, 1868

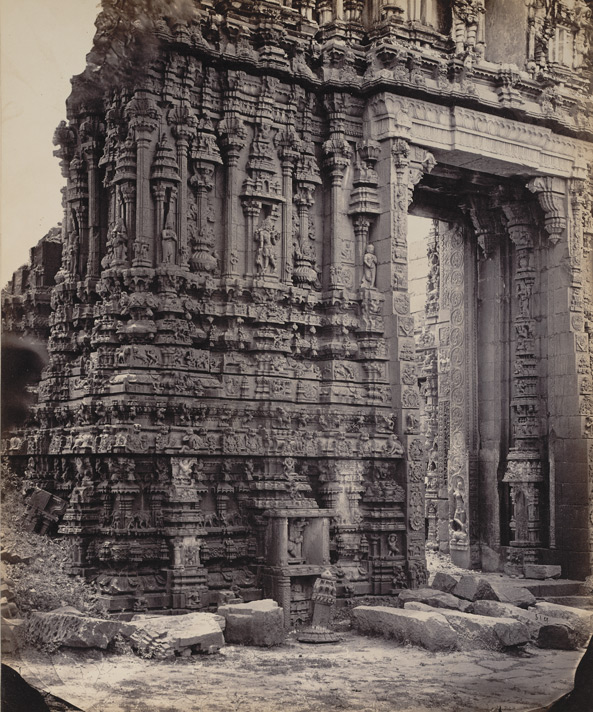
Tadpatri, Andhra Pradesh ruins of Ramalingeshvara Hindu temple, 1868

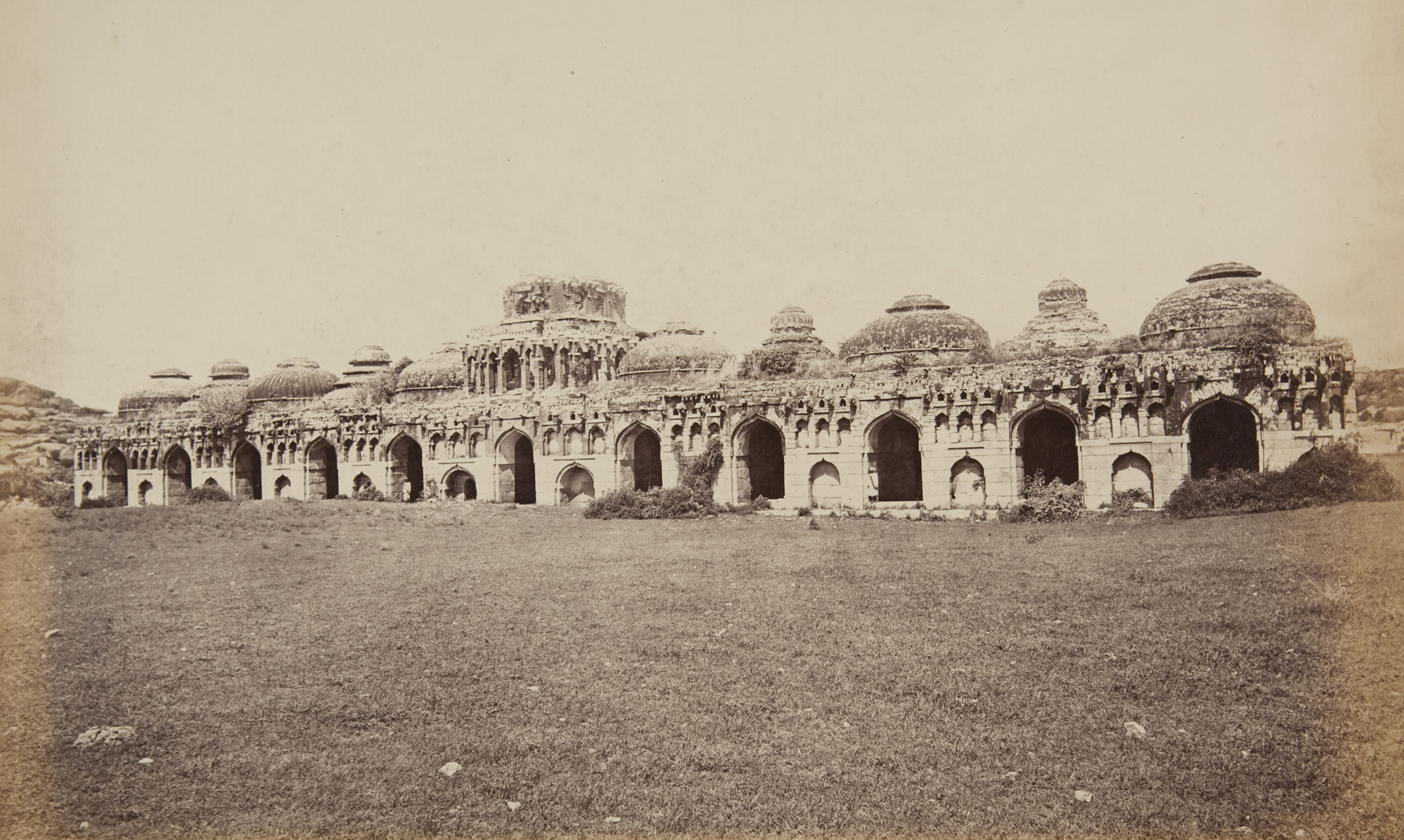
The Elephant Stables, c.1865-1871

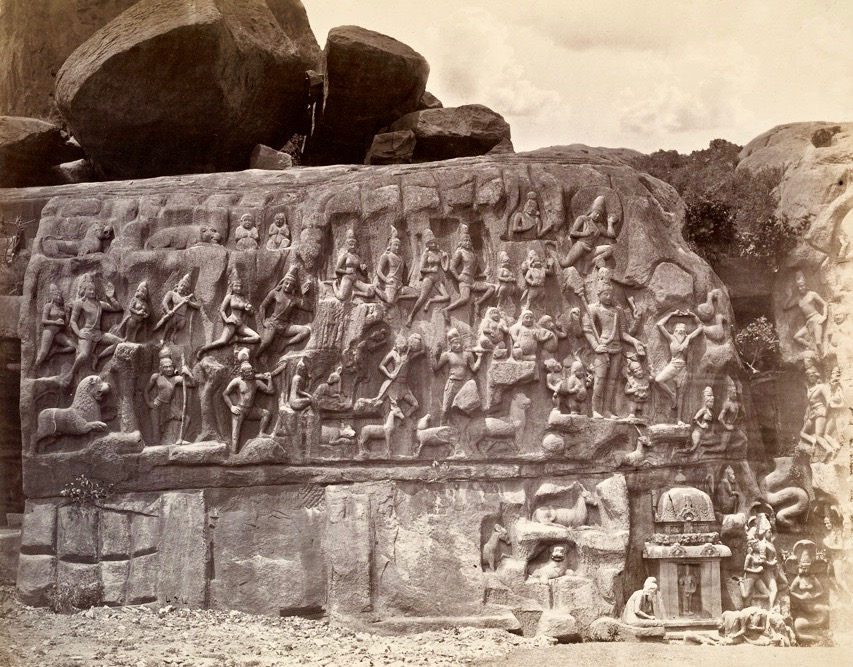
Arjuna's Penance, Mahabalipuram, Tamil Nadu, 1868
