= Hendrik Kerstens =

Dutch photographer and visual artist

- Born: Hendrik Kerstens; March 24, 1956; The Hague, Netherlands
- Known for: Photography and visual arts
- Notable work: Bag; Red Turban

Hendrik Kerstens (born The Hague, March 24, 1956) is a Dutch photographer and visual artist. He is known for his portraits of his daughter, Paula.

== Biography ==
Hendrik Kerstens did not train formally as an artist but ran a business in the city of The Hague as a cheese importer. After the birth of his daughter Paula, he left the business and took up photography. More than making family snapshots, he wanted to record the changes and events in his child's life. As Paula grew older, he developed himself from a documentary photographer into a visual artist specialized in staged photography.

== Photographs ==
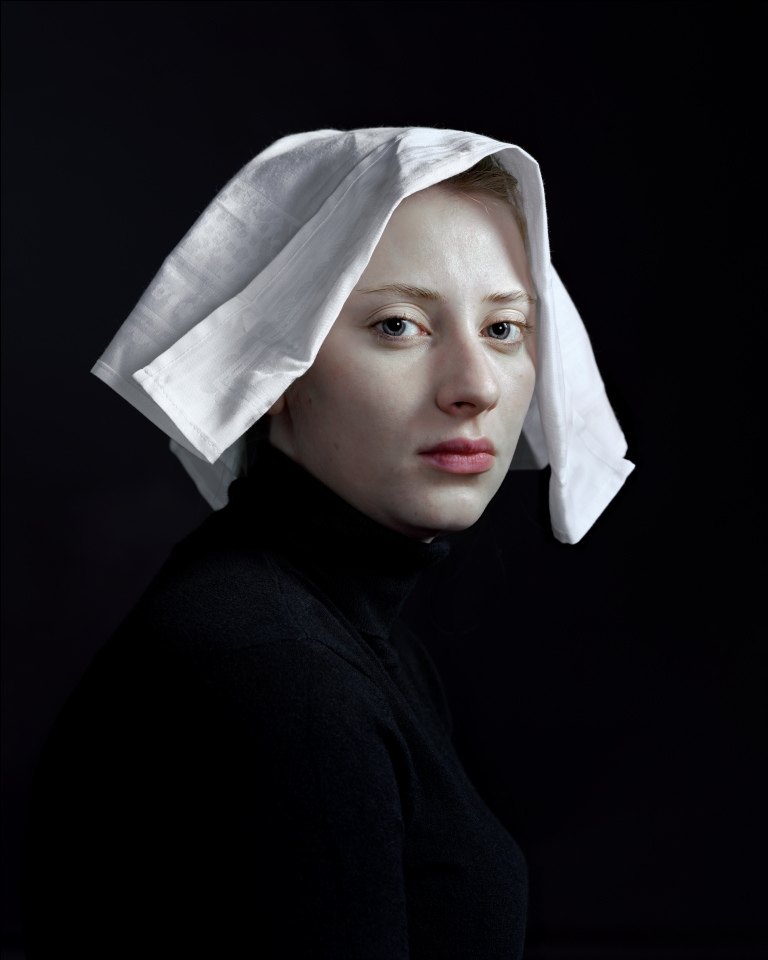
Paula Kerstens photographes by Hendrik Kerstens

Curators and critics notice the visual references to the traditional Old Master paintings in the photographs of Kerstens. For example, a Dutch critic stated that Kerstens turned his portrait Bag into a modern masterpiece in a similar way Frans Hals (1582-1666) did before him. Other art historians compared the photograph of Paula with a red turban (Red Turban) on her head with the portraits of Jan van Eyck (c. 1390-1441). Critics also suggest that Kerstens calls for attention regarding ecological problems (like the excessive use of plastic) by re-using plastic bags, cans and foils as modern accessories in his portraits. Kerstens' use of his daughter as his primary model and muse has drawn comparisons to photographer Sally Mann, with one American critic pointing out Paula's increasing agency in her own self-presentation as she ages, morphing the role of muse into that of collaborator to create "fierce self-portraits that rewrite the narrative of female objectification."

Besides art photography, Kerstens also produces commission photographs for periodicals like The New York Times Magazine. Among his sitters were director Michael Haneke (2007), visual artist Marlene Dumas (2008) and actor Alec Baldwin (2011).

== Recognition ==
The National Portrait Gallery in London honored the photograph Bag with a Taylor Wessing Photographic Portrait Prize in 2008. Fashion designer Alexander McQueen gave Kerstens all credits of being the source of inspiration for his show The Horn of Plenty (2009). A series of posters designed by Kerstens in 2010 for the Bayerische Staatsoper in München became awarded as the Beste Plakette des Jahres. In 2013 the Harper's Bazaar asked Kerstens to give his view on fashion, photographing clothes and accessories of designers such as Dolce & Gabbana, Comme des Garçons and others. This shoot was granted with the 11th Lucie Award for the best fashion lay-out of the year. The works of Kerstens are also shown in museums and collections all over the world.

== Personal life ==
Hendrik Kerstens lives and works in Amsterdam, the Netherlands, Europe.

== Publications (selection) ==
- Barnes, Martin e.a. Hendrik Kerstens: Paula – Silent Conversations. Antwerpen: Ludion, 2013. - ISBN 9789029589888
- Foam. Dutch Seen – New York Rediscovered. New York: Museum of the City of New York, 2009. - ISBN 9789490022037
- Howgate, Sarah e.a. 21st Century Portraits: a Compendium of the National Portrait Gallery. Londen: National Portrait Gallery, 2014. - ISBN 9781855144163
- Ryan, Kathy e.a. The New York Times Magazine Photographs. New York: Aperture, 2011. - ISBN 9781597111461
- Sinsheimer, Karen e.a. Portrayal-Betrayal: Santa Barbara Museum of Art: Photographic Portraits from the Permanent Collection. Santa Barbara: Santa Barbara Museum of Art, 2012. - ISBN 9780899511146
- Van den Heuvel, Maartje e.a. Hendrik Kerstens: Paula. Deventer: Thieme Art Publishers, 2010. - ISBN 9789078964384
- Van den Heuvel, Maartje (ed.) Self-Reflective. Hendrik & Paula Kerstens. Zwolle: W Books, 2023. - ISBN 9789462585577
- Zwagerman, Joost. “De Dingen de Baas: De Schoonheid van een Stukje Plastic.” In De Stilte van het Licht: Schoonheid en Onbehagen in de Kunst, p. 153-158. Amsterdam: De Arbeiderspers, 2015. - ISBN 9789029589888

== Collections (selection) ==
- Special Collections and Digital Collections of Leiden University Libraries - The Netherlands
- The Caldic Collection - Wassenaar - The Netherlands
- Santa Barbara Museum of Art - US
- Museum of Photographic Arts - San Diego - US
- Sir Elton John Collection - London - UK
- Alexander McQueen Collection - London - UK

== Awards (selection) ==
- PANL Award of the Netherlands (2001)
- The Taylor Wessing Prize of the National Portrait Gallery (2008)
- de medal, Porträtfotografie des Jahres (2010)
- The Lucie Award for the Best Fashion Layout of the Year (2013)
