= Flor Garduño =

Mexican photographer (born 1957)

- Born: 1957 (age 68–69); Mexico City, Mexico
- Occupation: Photographer
- Website: florgarduno.com

Flor Garduño (born 1957) is a Mexican photographer. Garduño is known for her black-and-white portraits of a diverse range of subjects, including indigenous people and cultures, street photography, and still lifes.

== Early life ==
In 1977, while studying at the Academy of San Carlos Garduño met Kati Horna and Manuel Álvarez Bravo, which became big influences in her work, along with Mariana Yampolsky.

In 1979, Garduño became an assistant to Álvarez Bravo, printing his portfolios in the darkroom for two years. In 1981, Garduño assisted Marianna Yampolsky (1925–2002) to document the indigenous people's culture and architecture in Mexico. This project was supported by the Instituto Nacional Indigenista.

== Career ==
Flor Garduño is known for taking black-and-white photographs consisting of fantasies, mythical and magical concepts, portraits of nudity, indigenous people and cultures, street photography, and still lifes.

Garduño's work has been exhibited in numerous museums such as the Museum of Modern Art in Mexico, New York and Chicago, as well as other museums in America and Europe. She has published four books: Magia del juego eterno (Magic of the Eternal Game) (1985), Bestiarium (1987), Testigos del tiempo (1992), and Mesteños (1994).

In 1982, Garduňo had her first solo exhibition in Mexico City, at the José Clemente Orozco Gallery. A year later, her work was presented in the exhibition Four From Mexico at the Mexican Museum in San Francisco, California.

Her travels to Guatemala, Ecuador, Peru, and Mexico consisted of black and white photographs of indigenous cultures which would appear in Magia del Juego Eterno, her first book in 1985.

The Museum of Photographic Arts in San Diego presented Garduño's earlier work categorized into three groups, called Trilogy: "Bestiarium", "Fantastic Women", and "Silent Natures" and includes 96 photographs taken in Mexico, Poland, and Switzerland.

"Bestiarium" includes her work of indigenous people of Mexico involving animals to present as symbolic attributes to the photo. One of her photos from this theme is called "Totem, Mexico" and includes a man beside a bull with a goat on standing on its back. The goat standing on the back of the bull is popular in Mexico. Her purpose in this photo was for her audience to analyze the symbolism the animals represent and to connect the viewer to a mythical world, which is why she chose the title "Totem, Mexico", and not just an ordinary nonspiritual title.

"Fantastic women" includes women and animal strength, with one of her photos "Rapto" picturing a woman holding a raptor by the tail feathers as it flaps away. Garduño's purpose in this photo is for the viewer to make both distinction and connection between the women and animal.

The third theme of the Trilogy, "Silent Natures" resembles still life's Garduño has taken. The title "Silent Natures" in Spanish is natura muerta which means dead nature, but Silent Natures better serves its purpose for relaying undead scenes.

According to writer Sylvia Wolf, Flor Garduño has always been very conscious of her own heritage and, therefore, has wanted to offer an homage to the peoples of the Americas, especially the most ancestral and isolated from Western civilization.

Concepción Bados-Ciria describes Garduño's work as emphasizing lyrical aspects of the Indians of Mesoamerica. Bados-Ciria states that the use of nudity in Garduño's work does not abandon the interior and the consciousness, but it rather praises the multiple and various bodies to challenge the dominant binary opposition body/spirit and, at the same time, she remaps a material which is cultural, historical, anthropological, sexual and racial. Bados-Ciria also mentions that Garduño's work focuses on Mexican themes, such as her photo series, "Testigos del tiempo" which has 72 photos in Latin American countries in a four-year period. The countries she traveled to during this period include Guatemala, Bolivia, Ecuador, and Mexico. While she visited, she stayed in homes of her subjects, sharing her photographs with them and sharing her experience.

Her work is part of the permanent collection of the Museum of Modern Art, the Art Institute of Chicago, the Bibliothèque nationale de France and the Museum Ludwig, among others.
