= Holly Roberts =

American visual artist

Holly Roberts (born December 22, 1951) is an American visual artist known for her combination of photography and paint. "Holly Roberts caused a stir in the fine art photography world of the eighties by fusing painting and photography, painting directly onto photographs". Roberts lives and works in Corrales, New Mexico. Her work is in the permanent collection of several museums in the United States.

== Early life and education ==
Holly Roberts was born in Boulder, Colorado. At the age of two, her family moved to Santa Fe, New Mexico where she spent the remainder of her early years. When she was sixteen she graduated early from high school and started her college career, taking six years in six different schools to complete her undergraduate education. She spent her freshman year at Western State College, then moved to the University of California, Santa Barbara for her sophomore year. Next she attended Instituto Allende and the Bellas Artes in San Miguel de Allende, then transitioned to the University of New Mexico's (UNM) Andean Center in Quito, Ecuador. Her time in Ecuador and Mexico ignited her interest in printmaking. She finished her undergraduate education by graduating from UNM with a Bachelor of Fine Arts with a minor in Spanish. After receiving her BFA, Roberts was hired by the Tamarind Institute, as curator of prints. There she was able to continue her printmaking while simultaneously attending painting classes at the University of New Mexico. After four years at Tamarind, in 1978 Roberts moved to Tempe, Arizona to attend graduate school at Arizona State University on a full scholarship. When Roberts finished her MFA, she and her partner, Robert Wilson, moved to Zuni, New Mexico so Wilson could pay back his medical school student loans working for the Indian Health Service. She and Wilson stayed in Zuni for eight years where their two daughters were born (in Gallup). In 1991 the family moved to Chicago, Illinois so that Wilson could complete his post doctoral work in sports medicine. Roberts and her family stayed for a year before returning to New Mexico where they settled in Corrales.

== Influences and themes ==
"The Content of Holly Roberts' images comes from two broad sources. First is her nearly lifelong experience of living in the American Southwest, from an attachment not only to the colors of the landscape and its active outdoor lifestyle, but to the ubiquitous influence of Native American, Mexican and Hispanic peoples indigenous to the area. The second source, which gets closer to the meaning of her work, is a conceptualization of human emotions, cultural history and interpersonal relationships. The images that include horses, deer, birds and other animals frequently reflect the emotional concerns of the other works." Her painted photographs have a psychological overtone.

Her technique from the mid 80's to 2003 was to develop her own black and white photographs, cut and glue them to a surface and then paint directly on them with oil paint. This created an eerie combination of the made-up world of the painted elements with the occasional reveal of the photograph. It was this process and style that gained her widespread recognition, mostly from the photographic corner of the world, "I didn't even think of myself as a photographer until I began to get all these awards in photography. I guess the photo world thought I was really great because I was so abusive to photography"

In 2004 Roberts flipped her process and, with the use of digital images and acrylic paint, began putting the photographic images on top of the paint. She explains, "I found that when the images that made the completed piece were made from photographs that came from disparate sources, but still related in some way, the images were much more powerful than just using the photograph directly as it was." "In her photo-painting hybrids Roberts synchronizes the abstract and imaginary with the literal and everyday." Around 2006, she began painting an "abstract dreamlike landscape" before adding her photographic work.

"The American Southwest continues to inspire and inform Robert's work. Guided by her imagination and emotional responses to the landscape, Roberts breathes additional life and narrative into her photographs, turning clouds, birds, snakes, gravel and trees into compelling works of art. Her finished pieces are deeply layered, both in a physical sense and in the stories woven by her intentional choice of characters, scenery, color palette, and title. Roberts masterfully brings together ideas of mortality and birth, longing and comfort, spirituality and humanity, disguised by humor or through a lighthearted aesthetic. The artist's use of allegory and characters [...] fuse together elements of spirituality and humanity." The imagery childlike and primitive, but the themes of her work are deal with issues that adults face every day.

"Roberts is clearly drawn in a more general sense to primitive art [...] her striving for simplicity within the images and her use of figures internally charged with meaning but freed from an enveloping environment are other aspects of this borrowing"

== Career ==
In 1973 Holly Roberts worked at Tamarind Institute for four years as a curator. After receiving her MFA from Arizona State University, she and her husband lived on the Zuni Indian Reservation where Roberts worked on her painted photographs and had two daughters, Ramey and Teal. She exhibited her work, and began to establish a name for herself when the Friends of Photography published a monograph of her work for their untitled series (#50). In 1991, she and her family moved to Chicago, where she set up a studio and continued to work, exhibiting her work widely. Upon returning to New Mexico the following year, she continued her studio practice while raising, with her husband, their two daughters. Along with making and exhibiting her art work, Roberts has developed an extensive workshop practice, teaching anywhere from 4-10 workshops a year in different locations at schools and universities around the country, among them Anderson Ranch Arts Center in Snowmass, Colorado; Penland School of Crafts in Penland, North Carolina; and Arrowmont School of Arts and Crafts in Gatlinburg, Tennessee.

== Awards ==
- 2008: Artist-in-Residence, Hollins University, Roanoke, Virginia
- 1988: National Endowment for the Arts, Photography
- 1986: National Endowment for the Arts, Photography; Ferguston Grant, Friends of Photography, Carmel, California
- 1981: Henry Laurence Gully Memorial Graduate Award, Arizona State University, Phoenix, Arizona

== Exhibitions ==
=== Select solo exhibitions ===
- 2018: Griffen Museum of Photography, Winchester, MA
- 2012: "Unusual Suspects: Paint and Photographs by Holly Roberts", Museum of Photographic Arts, San Diego.
- 2008: Eleanor D. Wilson Museum of Art, Hollins University, Roanoke, VA
- 2001: University of West Florida, Pensacola, FL; Galerie Peter Borchardt, Hamburg, Germany
- 2000: Robert C. May Photography Endowment Lecture Series, University of Kentucky Art Museum, Lexington
- 1999: University of Wyoming, Laramie, WY
- 1995: Film and Photography Gallery, Hampshire College, Amherst, MA
- 1994: Roger Williams University, School of Architecture Gallery, Bristol, RI
- 1993: Center for Photographic Art, Carmel, CA
- 1992: Presentation House Gallery, Presentation House, North Vancouver, B.C., Canada; Gallery 210, University of Missouri–St. Louis
- 1991: Joe and Emily Lowe Art Gallery, Syracuse University, Syracuse, NY
- 1990: Friends of Photography, San Francisco, CA; Photographic Resource Center, Boston University, Boston, MA
- 1986: North light Gallery, Arizona State University, Tempe, AZ
- 1985: Northern Montana Gallery, Montana State University–Northern, Havre, MT; Southern Light Gallery, Amarillo College, Amarillo, TX
- 1984: ASMSU Exhibit Gallery, Northern Montana State University, Bozeman, MT
- 1983: "Paintings by Holly Roberts", Arizona Commission on the Arts Traveling Exhibition
- 1981: "Memories of Mount Saint Helens", MFA Thesis Show, Harry Wood Gallery, Arizona State University, Tempe, AZ

=== Select group exhibitions ===
- 2017: "Body Language: Figuration in Modern and Contemporary Art", Tucson Museum of Art, Tucson, AZ; "Transformational Image Making: Handmade Photography Since 1960", Bevier Gallery, Rochester Institute of Technology, Rochester, NY
- 2016: "This is a Photograph", Penland Gallery, Penland, NC; "Self Regard: Artist Self-Portraits from the Collection", New Mexico Museum of Art, Santa Fe, NM; "Things that might have happened: selections from Transformational Image Making", Martin Art Gallery, Baker Center for the Arts, Muhlenberg College, Allentown, PA; "Beauty and the Beast: The Animal in Photography", MOPA, San Diego, CA
- 2015: "One of a Kind: Unique Photographic Objects", Phoenix Art Museum, Phoenix; "Visualizing Albuquerque", Albuquerque Museum of Art and History, Albuquerque, NM; "ABC: Assemblage, Book Art and Collage, Braithwaite Fine Arts Gallery, Southern Utah Museum of Art, Cedar City, UT; "This Art is Not Mine: The Jonathan Abrams and Fay Pfaelzer Abrams Art Collection" UNM Art Museum, Albuquerque, NM
- 2014: "Transformational Image Making: Handmade Photography Since 1960”, CEPA Gallery, Buffalo, NY; "Regeneration", The Photographer's Gallery, London, England; "Decisive Moments: Photographs from the Collection of Cherye R. and James F. Pierce", Honolulu Museum of Art, Honolulu, HI
- 2013: "Beyond the Human Experience", University of Saint Francis, Fort Wayne, IN; "Alternate Realities: The visions of Holly Roberts and Dan Estabrook", Center for Photographic Arts, Carmel, CA
- 2012: "Exploring Photographic Alternatives: Diane Bush, Darius Kuzmickas, and Holly Roberts", The Barrick Museum at UNLV, Las Vegas, NV
- 2011: "Painting Coast to Coast", Elaine Jacobs Gallery, Wayne State University, Detroit, MI; "Time Lapse: 4 Decades of Art" Sesnon Gallery's 40th Anniversary Exhibit, Mary Porter Sesnon Art Gallery, University of California, Santa Cruz, Santa Cruz, CA
- 2009: "Albuquerque Now", Albuquerque Museum, Albuquerque, NM

== Publications ==
- 2016: "75 Years at the Santa Barbara Museum of Art", Larry Feinberg, Santa Barbara Museum of Art, Marquand Books; "Beauty and the Beast: The Animal in Photography", Museum of Photographic Arts, San Diego, CA
- 2014: "Transformational Image Making: Handmade Photography Since 1960", Robert Hirsch Focal Press, London, England; "Holly Roberts", Art LTD, Nov./ Dec. 2014
- 2013: "Alternate Realities: The Visions of Dan Estabrook and Holly Roberts", Center for Photographic Art, Carmel, CA
- 2010: "Holly Roberts: Works 2000 to 2009", Nazraeli Press, Portland, OR
- 2008: "Photography: New Mexico", curated by Tom Barrow, Fresco Fine Art Publications; "Photographic Possibilities: The Expressive Use of Ideas, Materials and Processes", RObert Hirsch, Focal Press; "The Book of Alternative Photographic Processes", Christopher James, Delmar Cengage Learning, 2nd Edition
- 2007: "The Photography Collectors Guide", Bullfinch; "Light and Lens: Photography in the Digital Age", Robert Hirsch, Focal Press; "Exploring Color Photography: From the Darkroom to the Digital Photograph", 4th Ed., Robert Hirsch, McGraw-Hill
- 2002: "Idea Photographic: After Modernism", Museum of Fine Arts, Santa Fe, NM; "What Were You Thinking?", Fifteen Year Anniversary, Catherine Edelman Gallery, Chicago, IL
- 2000: "Holly Roberts: Works 1989-1999", Nazraeli Press, Tucson, AZ; "Painting as a Language", Jean Robertson and Craig McDaniel, Harcourt Brace
- 1997: "Defining Eye: Women Photographers of the 20th Century", Olivia Lahs-Gonzales and Lucy Lippard, The Saint Louis Art Museum
- 1994: "The Body", William A. Ewing, Thames and Hudson
- 1991: "The Horse: Photographic Images, 1839 to the Present", Gerald Lang and Lee Marks, Harry N. Abrams; "A Portrait is Not a Likeness", Center for Creative Photography, Tucson, AZ
- 1990: "Holly Roberts", Untitled Series, Friends of Photography, San Francisco, CA; "Northwest by Southwest: Painted Fictions", Palm Springs Art Museum, Palm Springs, CA
- 1988: "Exploring Color Photography", Robert Hirsch, W.M.C. Brown Company
- 1987: "Photography and Art: Interactions Since 1946", Kathleen Gauss and Andrew Grundberg, Los Angeles County Museum of Art

== Collections ==
- Santa Barbara Museum of Art, Santa Barbara, Florida
- Norton Museum, West Palm Beach, Florida
- Richard M. Ross Art Museum, Ohio Wesleyan University, Delaware, Ohio
- Special Collections, Green Library, Stanford University
- Art Institute of Chicago
- Museum of Photographic Art, San Diego, CA
- University of Arizona, Museum of Art, Tucson, AZ
- Phoenix Museum of Art
- Museum of Art, University of Iowa
- University Art Museum, University of New Mexico
- Grunwald Center for the Graphic Arts, University of California, Los Angeles
- Trisolini Collection, College of Fine Arts, Ohio University
- Tulsa City-County Library Collection
- University of Houston, Print Study Collection
- Center for Creative Photography, Tucson, AZ
- San Francisco Museum of Modern Art
- Museum of Fine Arts, Santa Fe, NM
- Museum of Fine Arts, Houston, TX
- University of Kentucky Art Museum, Lexington, KY
- Phoenix Arts Commission
- Albuquerque Museum of Art
- Monterey Peninsula Museum of Art, Monterey, CA
- Hallmark Collection of Art, Kansas City, MO
- California Museum of Photography, University of California, Riverside, CA
- Los Angeles Museum of Contemporary Art, Los Angeles, CA
- Bayly Museum of Art, University of Virginia, Charlottesville, VA
- University of Wyoming Art Museum, University of Wyoming, Laramie, WY
