= Lucie Awards =

American photography prize (founded 2003)

The Lucie Awards is an annual event honoring achievements in photography, founded in 2003 by Hossein Farmani.

The Lucie Awards is an annual gala ceremony presented by the Lucie Foundation (a 501 (c)3 non-profit charitable organization), honoring photographers and their achievements. The Lucies bring together photographers from all over the world and pay tribute to their colleagues. Every year, the advisory board nominates individuals for their contributions to photography across a variety of categories, and once the nominations are tallied, they are pre-announced months before the Lucies.

In addition to honoring photographers, the Lucie Awards also showcase the finalists and winners of the International Photography Awards (Lucie Foundation's sister-effort) annual photography competition, presenting over $22,500 in cash prizes and four distinct titles: The International Photographer of the Year (given to a professional), The Discovery of the Year (awarded to a non-professional), The Deeper Perspective Photographer of the Year (awarded to either a professional or non-professional) and the Moving Image Photographer of the Year (awarded to either a professional or non-professional).

The Lucie Awards also present statues to photographers in six different categories, entitled the Support Category Awards. Those categories acknowledge those integral to crafting an image. They are Book Publisher of the Year, Print Advertising Campaign of the Year, Fashion Layout of the Year, Picture Editor of the Year, Curator/Exhibition of the Year and Photography Magazine of the Year.

In the week leading up to the Lucie Awards, there are exhibitions and artist talks in New York City, including the annual International Photography Awards “Best of Show”, which shows 45 winning images from each calendar year's competition, selected by a different curator each year.

== History ==
In its 2003 inaugural year, the ceremony was held in Los Angeles, and then moved to New York City, where it has been held at the American Airlines Theatre, Lincoln Center and Carnegie Hall.

== Recipients ==
=== 2003 ===
- Henri Cartier-Bresson – 2003 Lifetime Achievement
- Robert Evans – 2003 Visionary Award
- Phil Borges – 2003 Humanitarian Award
- Ruth Bernhard – 2003 Achievement in Fine Art
- William Claxton – 2003 Achievement in Music
- Mary Ellen Mark – 2003 Achievement in Documentary.
- Steve McCurry – 2003 Achievement in Photojournalism
- Douglas Kirkland – 2003 Achievement in Entertainment
- Melvin Sokolsky – 2003 Achievement in Fashion
- Tim Street-Porter – 2003 Achievement in Architecture
- Phil Stern – 2003 Achievement in Still for Motion Pictures
- Annie Leibovitz – 2003 Women in Photography Award (presented by Women in Photography International)
- Gene Trindl – 2003 Achievement in Portraiture
- RJ Muna – 2003 Achievement in Advertising

=== 2004 ===
- Gordon Parks – 2004 Lifetime Achievement
- Sebastiao Salgado – 2004 Humanitarian Award
- Cornell Capa – 2004 Visionary Award
- Arthur Leipzig – 2004 Achievement in Fine Art
- James Nachtwey – 2004 Achievement in Photojournalism
- Sylvia Plachy – 2004 Women in Photography Award (presented by Women In Photography International)
- Julius Shulman – 2004 Achievement in Architecture
- Jim Marshall – 2004 Achievement in Music
- Bruce Davidson – 2004 Achievement in Documentary
- Bert Stern – 2004 Achievement in Entertainment
- Lillian Bassman – 2004 Achievement in Fashion
- Arnold Newman – 2004 Achievement in Portraiture
- Jay Maisel – 2004 Achievement in Advertising
- Walter Iooss – 2004 Achievement in Sports
- Bob Willoughby – 2004 Achievement in Still for Motion Pictures

=== 2005 ===
- William Klein – 2005 Lifetime Achievement
- Harry Benson – 2005 Achievement in Portraiture
- Larry Clark – 2005 Achievement in Documentary
- Lucien Clergue – 2005 Achievement in Fine Art
- Hiro – 2005 Achievement in Advertising
- Antonín Kratochvíl – 2005 Achievement in Photojournalism
- Peter Lindbergh – 2005 Achievement in Fashion
- Ozzie Sweet – 2005 Achievement in Sports
- Zana Briski – 2005 Humanitarian Award

=== 2006 ===
- David Bailey – 2006 Achievement in Fashion
- Eikoh Hosoe – 2006 Visionary Award
- Neil Leifer – 2006 Achievement in Sports
- Roger Mayne – 2006 Achievement in Documentary
- Duane Michals – 2006 Achievement in Portraiture
- Sarah Moon – 2006 Achievement in Fine Art
- Marc Riboud – 2006 Achievement in Photojournalism
- Willy Ronis – 2006 Lifetime Achievement
- Albert Watson – 2006 Achievement in Advertising

=== 2007 ===
- Elliott Erwitt – 2007 Lifetime Achievement
- Ralph Gibson – 2007 Achievement in Fine Art
- Philip Jones Griffiths – 2007 Achievement in Photojournalism
- Kenro Izu – 2007 Visionary Award
- Heinz Kluetmeier – 2007 Achievement in Sports
- Eugene Richards – 2007 Achievement in Documentary
- Lord Snowdon – 2007 Achievement in Portraiture
- Deborah Turbeville – 2007 Achievement in Fashion
- Howard Zieff – 2007 Achievement in Advertising
- Magnum Photos (established 1957) – 2007 Spotlight Award

=== 2008 ===
- Gianni Berengo Gardin – 2008 Lifetime Achievement
- Richard Misrach – 2008 Achievement in Fine Art
- Susan Meiselas – 2008 Achievement in Photojournalism
- Sara Terry and The Aftermath Project – 2008 Humanitarian Award
- John Iacono – 2008 Achievement in Sports
- Josef Koudelka – 2008 Achievement in Documentary
- Herman Leonard – 2008 Achievement in Portraiture
- Patrick Demarchelier – 2008 Achievement in Fashion
- Erwin Olaf – 2008 Achievement in Advertising
- Visa pour l'image (established 1988) – 2008 Spotlight Award

=== 2009 ===
- Gilles Peress – 2009 Achievement in Photojournalism
- Marvin Newman – 2009 Achievement in Sports
- Ara Guler – 2009 Lifetime Achievement
- Jean-Paul Goude – 2009 Achievement in Fashion
- Mark Seliger – 2009 Achievement in Portraiture
- Reza – 2009 Achievement in Documentary
- W. Eugene Smith Memorial Fund (established 1979) – 2009 Spotlight Award

=== 2010 ===
- Tina Barney – 2010 Achievement in Portraiture
- Howard Bingham – 2010 Achievement in Photojournalism
- James Drake – 2010 Achievement in Sports
- David Goldblatt – 2010 Lifetime Achievement
- Graciela Iturbide – 2010 Achievement in Fine Art
- Michael Nyman – 2010 The Double Exposure Award
- Lee Tanner – 2010 Achievement in Documentary
- The Eddie Adams Workshop – 2010 Visionary Award
- Center for Photography at Woodstock – 2010 Spotlight Award

=== 2011 ===
- Dawoud Bey – 2011 Achievement in Portraiture
- Bill Eppridge – 2011 Achievement in Photojournalism
- Rich Clarkson – 2011 Achievement in Sports
- Nobuyoshi Araki – 2011 Achievement in Fine Art
- Eli Reed – 2011 Achievement in Documentary
- Nancy McGirr – 2011 Humanitarian Award
- The International Center of Photography – 2011 Spotlight Award

=== 2012 ===
- Greg Gorman – 2012 Achievement in Portraiture
- David Burnett – 2012 Achievement in Photojournalism
- John Biever – 2012 Achievement in Sports
- Joel Meyerowitz – 2012 Lifetime Achievement
- Tod Papageorge – 2012 Achievement in Documentary
- Arthur Tress – 2012 Achievement in Fine Art
- Jessica Lange – 2012 Double Exposure Award
- Brigitte Lacombe – 2012 Achievement in Travel and Portraiture

=== 2013 ===
- Li Zhensheng – 2013 Achievement in Documentary
- Victor Skrebneski – 2013 Achievement in Fashion
- John H. White – 2013 Achievement in Photojournalism
- Lisa Kristine – 2013 Humanitarian Award
- Benedikt Taschen – 2013 Visionary Award
- Harper's Bazaar (for article of Hendrik Kerstens's fashion photographs) - 2013 Fashion Layout of the Year

=== 2014 ===
- Carrie Mae Weems – 2014 Achievement in Fine Arts
- Martin Parr – 2014 Achievement in Documentary
- Jane Bown – 2014 Lifetime Achievement
- Nick Ut – 2014 Achievement in Photojournalism
- Nan Goldin – 2014 Achievement in Portraiture
- Pedro Meyer – 2014 Visionary Award

=== 2015 ===
- George Tice – 2015 Lifetime Achievement
- Danny Lyon – 2015 Achievement in Documentary
- Stephanie Sinclair – 2015 Humanitarian Award
- Jerry Uelsmann – 2015 Achievement in Fine Arts
- David Hume Kennerly – 2015 Achievement in Photojournalism
- Roxanne Lowit – 2015 Achievement in Fashion
- Henry Diltz – 2015 Achievement in Music
- Barton Silverman – 2015 Achievement in Sports

=== 2016 ===
- Anthony Hernandez – 2016 Achievement in Fine Arts
- Tsuneko Sasamoto – 2016 Lifetime Achievement
- Don McCullin – 2016 Achievement in Photojournalism
- Rosalind Fox Solomon – 2016 Achievement in Portraiture
- Graham Nash – 2016 Double Exposure Award
- Nathan Lyons – 2016 Visionary Award
- Simon Bruty – 2016 Achievement in Sports
- Musée de l'Élysée – 2016 Spotlight Award

=== 2017 ===
- Art Shay – Lifetime Achievement
- Larry Fink – Achievement in Documentary
- Josephine Herrick Project – Humanitarian Award
- Abelardo Morell – Achievement in Fine Arts
- Steve Schapiro – Achievement in Photojournalism
- Dominique Issermann – Achievement in Fashion
- Judith Joy Ross – Achievement in Portraiture

=== 2018 ===
- Lee Friedlander – Lifetime Achievement
- Jane Evelyn Atwood – Achievement in Documentary
- Shahidul Alam – Humanitarian Award
- Raghu Rai – Achievement in Photojournalism
- Gian Paolo Barbieri – Achievement in Fashion
- Joyce Tenneson – Achievement in Portraiture
- Camera Club of the Philippines – Spotlight Award
- Co Rentmeester Achievement in Sports
- John Moore – Inaugural Impact Award
- Mohammad Rakibul Hasan – Discovery of the Year

=== 2019 ===
- Jay Maisel – Lifetime Achievement
- Stephen Shore – Achievement in Fine Arts
- Edward Burtynsky – Achievement in Documentary
- Zanele Muholi – Humanitarian Award
- Maggie Steber – Achievement in Photojournalism
- Ellen von Unwerth – Achievement in Fashion
- Annie Leibovitz – Achievement in Portraiture
- Rencontres d'Arles – Spotlight Award
- Al Bello – Achievement in Sports
- Tyler Hicks – Impact Award

=== 2020 ===
2020 Lucie Awards postponed due to the COVID-19 situation.

=== 2021 ===
- Peter Magubane – Lifetime Achievement
- Paul Caponigro – Achievement in Fine Arts
- David Hurn – Achievement in Documentary
- Joel Sartore – Humanitarian Award
- Jean-Pierre Laffont – Achievement in Photojournalism
- Pamela Hanson – Achievement in Fashion
- Lynn Goldsmith – Achievement in Portraiture
- Steven Sasson – Spotlight Award
- Bob Martin – Achievement in Sports
- Paul Ratje – Impact Award

=== 2022 ===
- Robert Adams – Lifetime Achievement
- Sally Mann – Achievement in Fine Arts
- Lynn Johnson – Achievement in Documentary
- Ami Vitale – Humanitarian Award
- Michelle V. Agins – Achievement in Photojournalism
- Manuel Outumuro – Achievement in Fashion
- Kwame Brathwaite – Achievement in Portraiture
- Tony Duffy – Achievement in Sports
- Koto Bolofo – Achievement in Advertising
- Candida Höfer – Achievement in Architecture
- Baxter St at the Camera Club of New York – Spotlight/Visionary Award
- Lynsey Addario – Impact Award

=== 2023 ===
- Raymond Depardon – Lifetime Achievement
- Jo Ann Callis – Achievement in Fine Arts
- Jamel Shabazz – Achievement in Documentary
- Paul Nicklen and Cristina Mittermeier – Humanitarian Award
- Carol Guzy – Achievement in Photojournalism
- Ming Smith – Achievement in Portraiture
- Donald Miralle – Achievement in Sports
- Firooz Zahedi – Achievement in Entertainment
- Antwaun Sargent – Spotlight/Visionary Award
- Saher Alghorra - Impact Award

=== 2025 ===
- Massimo Vitali – Lifetime Achievement
- Adger Cowans – Achievement in Fine Arts
- Cristina García Rodero – Achievement in Documentary
- James Balog – Humanitarian Award
- Paolo Pellegrin – Achievement in Photojournalism
- Martin Schoeller – Achievement in Portraiture
- Peter Robinson – Achievement in Sports
- Marco Glaviano – Achievement in Fashion
- Justine Evans – Achievement in Moving Image
- Hélène Binet – Achievement in Architecture
- Nino Migliori – Visionary Award
- CAMERA - Centro Italiano per la Fotografia – Spotlight Award
- Philip Holsinger – Impact Award
