= Tsuneko Sasamoto =

Japanese photographer (1914–2022)

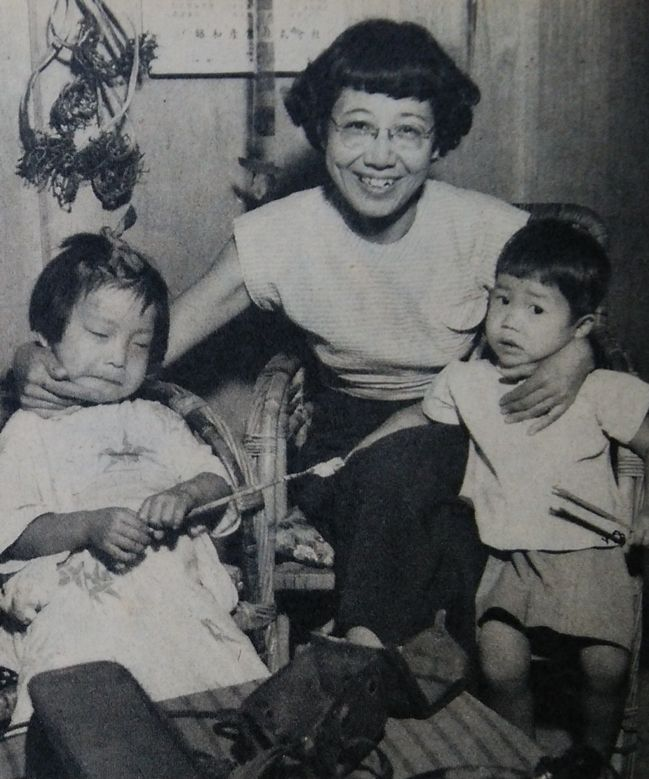
- Sasamoto in 1952
- Born: 1 September 1914; Tokyo, Japan
- Died: 15 August 2022 (aged 107)
- Occupations: Photojournalist, photographer
- Known for: Japan's first female photojournalist
- Honours: Lucie Award for Lifetime Achievement

Tsuneko Sasamoto (笹本 恒子, Sasamoto Tsuneko; 1 September 1914 – 15 August 2022) was Japan's first female photojournalist.

== Early life ==
Sasamoto was born in Tokyo, Japan. She went to a college of home economics, but quit because of her ambition to become a painter. After dropping out, she attended an institute of painting without telling her parents, and a dressmaking school.

== Career ==
Sasamoto started her career as a part-time illustrator on the local news pages in Tokyo Nichinichi Shimbun (now Mainichi Shimbun, one of the newspapers in Japan). At 26, she got promoted to a probationary employee in 1940 when she joined the Photographic Society in Japan, officially becoming the first female photojournalist in Japan. She stated that Margaret Bourke-White was a major influence in why she became a photographer. Sasamoto photographed subjects from General Douglas MacArthur during the American occupation of Japan to striking coalminers and protesting students.

She published a photo book in 2011 called Hyakusai no Finder, or Centenarian’s Finder. In 2014, Sasamoto had an exhibit of her work from her 2011 book called Hyakusai Ten, or, Centenarian’s Exhibition. In 2015, Sasamoto published another book, Inquisitive Girl at 101. She broke her left hand and both legs in 2015 but continued to photograph. Prior to her death, Sasamoto was working on a project called Hana Akari (Flower Glow) in honor of her friends who had died.

Sasamoto turned 100 in September 2014, and died of natural causes on 15 August 2022, at the age of 107.

== Awards ==
2016: Lucie Award for Lifetime Achievement
