= Al-Zahra =

- Municipality type C

Arabic transcription(s)
  - Arabic: الزهراء
  - Latin: Madinat Az-Zahra' (official); Ezahra (unofficial)
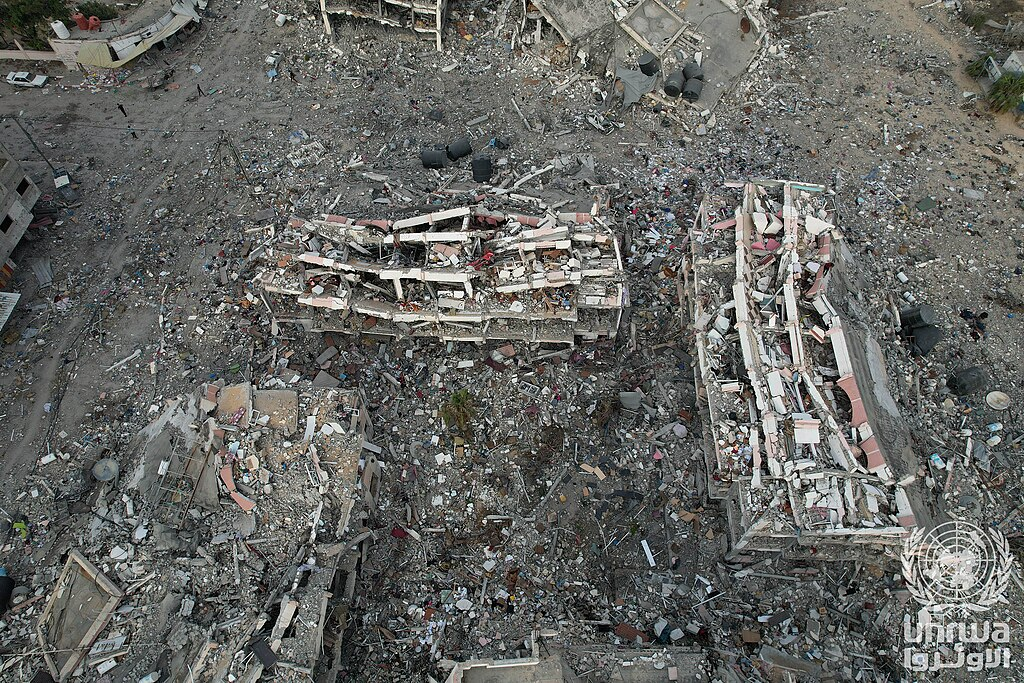
- Ruins in al-Zahra in November 2023

- Municipal Seal of Al-Zahra' Municipality
- Interactive map of Al-Zahra
- Coordinates: 31°28′17.69″N 34°24′4.62″E
- State: State of Palestine
- Governorate: Gaza
- Founded: 1998

Government
  - Type: Municipality
  - Control: Hamas
  - Head of Municipality: Tareq Hijo

Area
  - Total: 4.6 km^{2} (1.8 sq mi)

Population (2017)
  - Total: 5,338
  - Density: 1,200/km^{2} (3,000/sq mi)
- Etymology: The Rose

Al-Zahra (Arabic: الزهراء) is a Palestinian municipality in the Gaza Governorate, south of Gaza and north of the Wadi Gaza, in the central Gaza Strip. The University of Palestine and Ummah Open University are located there. In 2017, it had a population of 5,338. There were 837 housing units and 237 other buildings in the town.

Yasser Arafat established Al-Zahra in the 1990s as a residential area for Palestine Authority staff and supporters. It remained a neighborhood with larger houses and more open space than others in Gaza City. In 1998, a Bronze Age archaeological site was discovered at Al-Zahra during work on a housing project. The site was subsequently named Tell es-Sakan and investigated by archaeologists.

In the Gaza war, it was untouched by airstrikes until October 19, 2023, when more than twenty apartment blocks were bombed by the Israel Defense Forces.
