= Carl Henry =

Carl Henry may refer to:

- Carol Henry (photographer) (born 1960), American fine arts photographer
- Carl Henry (singer) (born 1974), Canadian singer
- Carl F. H. Henry (1913–2003), evangelical theologian
- Carl Henry (basketball) (born 1960), American former basketball player
- Carl Henry (politician) (1905–1995), Norwegian politician
- Carl Henry (born 1961), drummer with English band Half Man Half Biscuit
- C. J. Henry (born 1986), or Carl Henry, Jr., athlete, son of the basketball player

== See also ==
- Karl Henry (born 1982), English footballer
