= Kenro Izu =

Japanese photographer, children's charity worker

- 井津 建郎
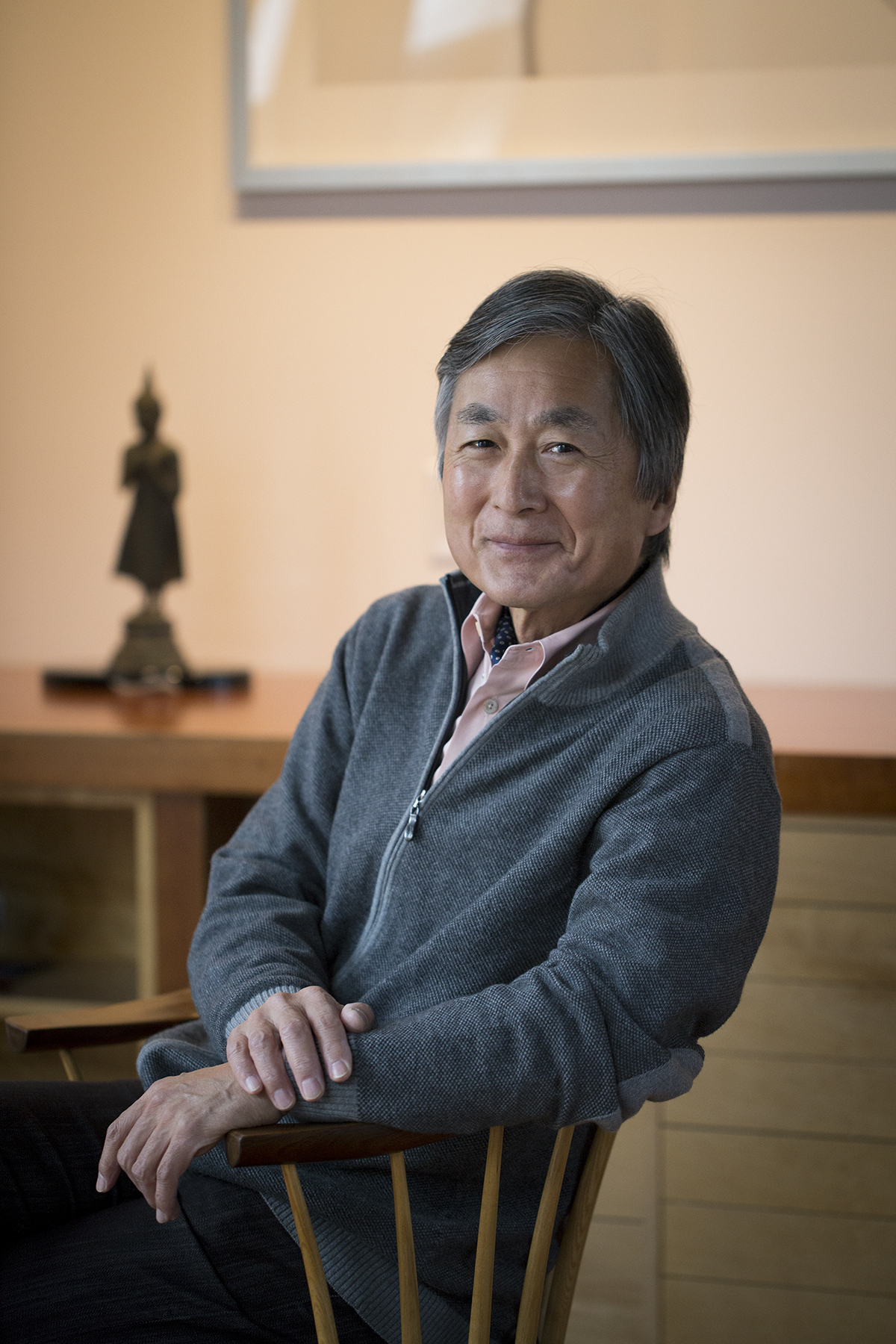
- Kenro Izu (2014)
- Born: Osaka
- Education: Nihon University
- Known for: photography
- Website: http://kenroizu.com/

Kenro Izu (井津 建郎, Izu Kenrō; born 1949 in Osaka) is a Japanese-born photographer based in the United States. He is the founder of children's charity Friends Without a Border, for which he has received two awards. He has also been awarded for his photography.

== Life ==
Izu attended Nihon University College of Art in Tokyo from 1969-1972. After moving to the United States in 1972, he spent two years working as a photo assistant in New York City and subsequently established his own studio, specializing in still life photography. Since 1979, in addition to his well established commercial work, Kenro began his serious professional commitment to his fine art photography, traveling the world to capture the sacred ancient stone monuments in their natural settings. He traveled and documented Egypt, Syria, Jordan, England, Scotland, Mexico, France and Easter Island (Chile).

He has also focused on Buddhism and Hindu monuments in South East Asia: Cambodia, Burma, Indonesia, Vietnam and India. Through them, he captures profound beauty with natural states of decay. Izu is the recipient of the 2007 Lucie Awards’ Visionary Photographer award, and was published by En Foco's photographic journal Nueva Luz.

== Charity work ==
In 1996, Izu founded Friends Without a Border, an organization devoted to raising funds for children’s hospitals in Cambodia. Profits from select prints sales and his book, Light Over Ancient Angkor, are donated to this cause.

In 2007, Izu was awarded the Pacesetter Award from New York Hospital Queens, the highest award presented by the medical center. Kenro was honored at NYHQ's "A Spring Night Gala" for his leadership and humanitarian efforts to heal, nurture, and protect innocent life in Cambodia. Also in 2007, Kenro was the recipient of the Honorary Visionary Award by the Lucie Awards.

In 2014, Izu was given a World of Children Award. The award has been called the "Nobel Prize for Child Advocates", and is the only global recognition honoring individuals for serving vulnerable children worldwide.

== Awards and fellowships ==
- 2018 The Medal of Light, The Royal Photographic Society of Thailand
- 2014 Health Award by World of Children Awards, New York, NY
- 2011 Lucca Photo Award, Lucca Photo Fest, Italy
- 2007 Pacesetter Award by New York Hospital, Queens. NY
- 2007 Visionary Award by Lucie Awards
- 2005 Visual Award by Center for Photography of Art, Woodstock, NY
- 2002 John Simon Guggenheim Memorial Foundation Fellowship
- 2000 Cultural Promotion Award by Photographic Society of Japan
- 1999 Lou Stoumen Prize for Photography
- 1985 New York Foundation of Arts
- 1984 National Endowment of Arts
- 1981 Catskill Center Photography Fund

== Publications ==
- „Nueva Luz photographic journal”, Volumes 12#2 (2007), and 1#1 (1984)
- Light Over Ancient Angkor, published by Friends Without A Border (1996)
- Still Life, published by ARENA Editions (1998)
- Light over Sacred Places of Asia, published by K*MoPA (2001)
- Sacred Places, published by ARENA Editions (2001)
- Passage to Angkor, published by Channel Photographics (2003)
- Blue, published by Howard Greenberg Gallery (2004)
- BHUTAN sacred within, published by Nazraeli Press (2007)
- Kenro Izu-30th year retrospective by Nazraeli Press (2010)
- BLUE, six by six book by Nazraeli Press (2012)
- Kenro Izu/Territori dello spirito, by Fondazione Fotografia Modena/Skira (2014)
- Songs of Lao, Nazraeli Press (2016)
- Eternal Light, Steidle (2018)
- Seduction, Damiani (2018)
- Pompeii-Requiem, Fondazione Fotografia Modena/Skira (2019)
- Requiem, Nazraeli Press (2019)
