= University of Palestine =

Private university in Gaza, Palestine

Coordinates: 31°28′34″N 34°24′12″E

- جامعـــة فلسطيـــن
- Type: Private
- Established: 2005
- Chairman: Imad Al Agha
- President: Salem A. Sabbah
- Chairman of Board of Trustees: Farouq Momtaz Alfranji
- Location: Al-Zahra, Gaza, Palestine
- Website: up.edu.ps
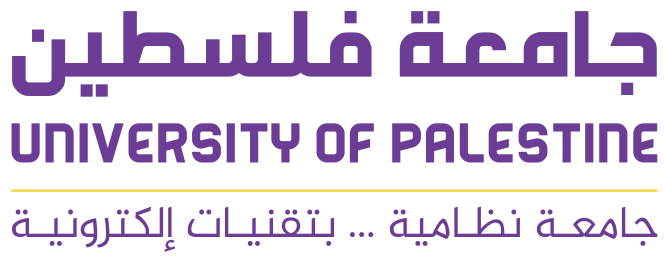

The University of Palestine (UP; Arabic: جامعة فلسطين) is a private university in Al-Zahra', Gaza Strip, Palestine. The university was established in 2005, making it one of Gaza's youngest higher education institutions.

== History ==
The University of Palestine was established in 2005 by a group of academics, researchers, and investors. The university received its initial license in 2005 and general accreditation in 2007.

When the university expanded in the late 2000s, it encroached on the archaeological site of Tell es-Sakan, resulting in the destruction of about a quarter of the Bronze Age settlement.

On October 20, 2023, Israeli military used missiles to destroy more than 20 buildings in the Al-Zahra neighborhood, where the university is located. UP's main campus was destroyed by the Israeli military on January 17, 2024, when Israel detonated "more than 300 mines" at the university. The campus had been used to shelter displaced families during the Gaza War. Dr. Ahmed Hamdi Abo Absa, the Dean of the Software Engineering Department, was shot and killed by Israeli soldiers in the war.

== Programs ==
Across its seven colleges, UP offers four non-degree diploma programs in addition to its standard four-year programs. Besides its Al-Zahra headquarters, it has subsidiary branches in Khan Younis and Beit Lahiya. The university's primary scholarship system is merit-based, with award amounts largely dependent on students' Tawjihi scores; it also offers legacy financial aid.

The university offers an open access repository for scholarly output by research centers, faculty staff and students, as well as a published Arabic Lightweight OpenCourseWare. Along with a stadium, the university also had a legal clinic, multiple medical clinics, an English Language Proficiency Center, a 30,000-book library and an engineering office.

UP has cooperative partnerships with multiple international universities, primarily in the Middle East, including Cairo University, Alexandria University, Daffodil International University in Bangladesh, Universitat de Barcelona, and others.
