= Hossein Farmani =

American art curator

Hossein Farmani is a creative director, gallerist, exhibition curator, philanthropist and founder and president of the Lucie Awards in New York City, Focus on AIDS Foundation and Farmani Gallery.

== Career ==
In 1984, he started VUE magazine, which was distributed worldwide.

Farmani brought together Susan Baraz, Candace Falk, Robert Berman, Ron Bakal and Laura Hinds to start the Focus on AIDS Foundation to help create awareness and raise money to fund research and care. Focus on AIDS is a 100% volunteer group.

Farmani started the Foto-Folio Magazine, a photography magazine.

In 2003, The Lucie was established by Farmani, and a Farmani Gallery in both Los Angeles and New York City were established.

Farmani also co-founded the Palm Springs Photo Festival, and Month of Photography LA.

In 2015, Farmani founded the Lucie Technical Awards, to honor the people responsible for photographic technology.
