= Adrienne Salinger =

American photographer

Adrienne Salinger (born 1956) is an American photographer.

Salinger is best known for her 1995 photo book In My Room: Teenagers in their Bedrooms. Her work is included in the collection of the Museum of Fine Arts Houston, the Washington State Arts Commission, the National Gallery of Canada and the Art Institute of Chicago. Salinger is a professor of photography at the University of New Mexico.

== Photo books ==
- 1995 In My Room: Teenagers in their Bedrooms
- 1999 Living Solo
- 2007 Middle Aged Men
