= ICRC Humanitarian Visa d'or Award =

Photojournalism award

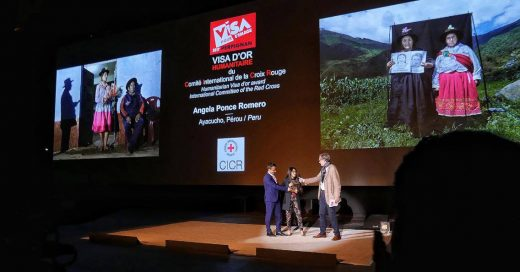
- Presentation of the ICRC Humanitarian Visa d’or (2017 edition) in Perpignan to photographer Angela Ponce-Romero
- Type: Photojournalism
- Sponsored by: International Committee of the Red Cross
- Country: France
- First award: 2011
- Website: Retrospective of the ICRC Humanitarian Visa d’or

The ICRC Humanitarian Visa d'or Award has been awarded annually to a professional photojournalist who has covered a humanitarian issue related to an armed conflict since 2011. It is part of the annual Visa pour l’image international festival of photojournalism, which takes place in Perpignan, France.

== History ==
In 2011, the regional delegation of the International Committee of the Red Cross (ICRC) in France decided to create the “ICRC Humanitarian Visa d'or Award”, endowed with 8,000 euros. The aim is to honor the work photojournalists carry out every day in the field and to promote international humanitarian law through the lens of photography.

In its 15 editions, the Humanitarian Visa d'or has explored various facets of the humanitarian consequences of armed conflict:

- 2011 - 2014: Respect for medical missions in wartime
- 2015 - 2017: Women in war
- 2018 - 2021: Wars in cities
- 2022 - 2023: Forced displacement of populations
- 2024 - 2025: The fate of civilians in armed conflicts

== Awards winners ==
=== 2025 ===
Theme: The fate of civilians in armed conflicts

Saher Alghorra, a Palestinian photographer, for his report entitled We Have No Escape, produced in the Gaza Strip. Through a series of images, he documents the daily life of a population that has been in conflict since October 7, 2023. For more than 17 months, Saher Alghorra has captured scenes of survival, suffering, and also resilience, bringing us close to the lives of families.

=== 2024 ===
Theme: The fate of civilians in armed conflicts

Hugh Kinsella Cunningham, a British photographer, for his work on refugee camps in the Democratic Republic of the Congo.

=== 2023 ===
Theme: The living conditions of migrants

Federico Rios Escobar, an independent Colombian photographer, for a photo report on migrants in the Darién Gap.

=== 2022 ===
Theme: Forced displacement of populations

Sameer Al-Doumy for his report “Routes of Death”, on migrants attempting to cross into England from Calais, produced for Agence France-Presse.

=== 2021 ===
Theme: the consequences of urban warfare on civilians

Antoine Agoudjian, whose report for Le Figaro Magazine “powerfully depicts the heavy toll paid by civilians during the latest escalation of violence in Nagorno-Karabakh, with intense shelling and fighting in urban areas on both sides of the front line.”

=== 2020 ===
Theme: the consequences of urban warfare on civilians

Alfredo Bosco, freelance photographer and contributor to Luz Photo Agency in Milan, won the 10th edition of the ICRC Humanitarian Visa d’or Award for his report on the drug war in the state of Guerrero, Mexico. Geopolitical crises are the main focus of his work.

=== 2019 ===
Theme: the consequences of urban warfare on civilians
Abdulmonam Eassa, Syrian photojournalist, born in 1995, now refugee in France, was rewarded for a report about the humanitarian consequences of the fighting in Eastern Ghouta in 2018. He started his career in photojournalism as a self-taught freelance photographer. He works with Agence France Presse.

=== 2018 ===
Theme: the consequences of urban warfare on civilians
Véronique de Viguérie, French photojournalist was rewarded for her report “Heroines, war made”, which pays tribute to Yemeni women, surviving in urban areas, and who in the absence of men, act as heads of families or also nurses. She works with Getty Images and Verbatim Photo Agency, among others.

=== 2017 ===
Theme: Women in war
Angela Ponce Romero, Peruvian photojournalist from the Diario Correo, was rewarded for her work entitled “Ayacucho” accomplished in Peru. "Ayacucho”, from the Quechua words “aya” meaning “corpse” and “cucho” meaning “corner,” is the “corner of the dead.” Her report covers commemorative events held in Ayacucho, in 2016 and 2017, with families still looking for their relatives gone missing during the civil war in the 80s.

=== 2016 ===
Theme: Women in war
Juan Arredonde, Colombian-American photojournalist who often works with the New York Times and National Geographic, was rewarded for his photo essay “Born into Conflict: Child soldiers in Colombia”.

=== 2015 ===
Theme: Women in war
Diana Zeyneb Alhindawi, photojournalist for the New York Times, WSJ, Le Monde and Vice was rewarded in 2015 for her work entitled “Minova rape trials” shot in the Democratic Republic of Congo.

=== 2014 ===
Theme: violence against health care services in armed conflict
William Daniels, French photojournalist and contributor to National Geographic, received the ICRC Humanitarian Visa d'or Award for his work entitled “Humanitarian Crisis in the Central African Republic.”

=== 2013 ===
Theme: violence against health care services in armed conflict

Sebastiano Tomada (Piccolomini), American photojournalist, working with Getty Images, was rewarded for his report in Syria called « Life and Death in Aleppo ».

=== 2012 ===
Theme: violence against health care services in armed conflict

Mani, Franco-Algerian photojournalist and film-maker, was awarded in 2012 for his report “Syria, Inside Homs”, produced for the French media Le Monde.

=== 2011 ===
Theme: violence against health care services in armed conflict

Catalina Martin-Chico, Spanish-French photographer with the Cosmos agency, was the first winner of the ICRC Humanitarian Visa d'or Award for her report “The First Square Kilometer of Freedom: Change Square, Sana’a, Yemen.”
