= Arthur Ollman =

American photographer, curator, and academic

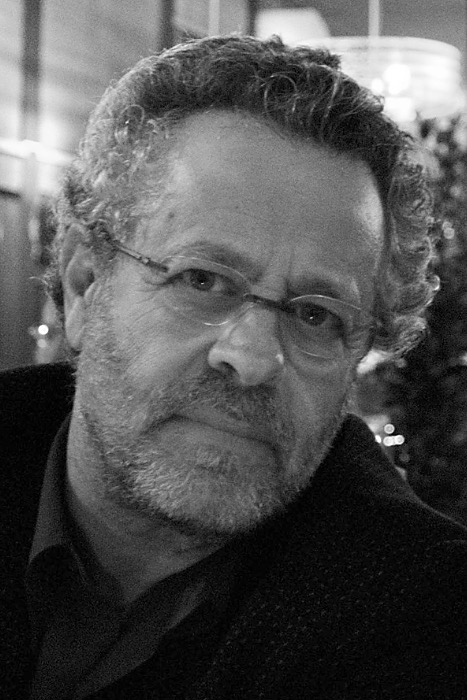
- Arthur Ollman
- Born: March 6, 1947 (age 79); Milwaukee, Wisconsin, U.S.
- Education: University of Wisconsin, Madison (B.A., 1969); Lone Mountain College, San Francisco (MFA)
- Occupations: Photographer; author; curator; academic
- Years active: 1960s–present
- Employer(s): San Diego State University (Professor, later Professor Emeritus)
- Known for: Founding director of the Museum of Photographic Arts (MoPA), San Diego; curator; photographic exhibitions and publications
- Spouse: Leah Ollman (m. 1987)
- Children: 2

Arthur Ollman (born March 6, 1947) is an American photographer, author, curator, professor emeritus (San Diego State University (2006—2019), and founding director of The Museum of Photographic Arts, San Diego. He served as MoPA director from 1983 to 2006, and as director of the School of Art, Design and Art History, SDSU, from 2006 to 2011. He was president of the board of directors for the Foundation for the Exhibition of Photography (2015—2019) and has authored and contributed to more than twenty-five books and catalogs.

== Early life and education ==
Arthur Ollman was born in Milwaukee in 1947, the grandson of Jewish immigrants from Ukraine. He studied art history at the University of Wisconsin, Madison (1965—1969). After graduating with a BA, Ollman purchased fifty-three acres of forestland in Bucksport, Maine, and started a commune while pursuing an interest in photography. He left Maine in 1974 to attend San Francisco Art Institute, and in 1975, the MFA program at Lone Mountain College (now part of University of San Francisco). There he expanded on photographing at night with long exposures, switching from black and white to color.

== Career ==
The first museum to purchase Ollman’s images was The Museum of Modern Art, in 1977. He went on to exhibit in one-person and group exhibitions at Whitney Museum of American Art, Centre Georges Pompidou, San Francisco Museum of Modern Art, and Los Angeles County Museum of Art. His work is in many international museum collections.

Ollman was one of the founding members of the board of directors for San Francisco Camerawork and served as chairman of the board from 1979 to 1983. There he curated exhibitions of many well-known figures in contemporary photography. In 1976, he created The Photo History Video Project, producing oral historical video interviews with older Western photographers who had not yet been well researched. These included Laura Gilpin, Pirkle Jones and Ruth-Marion Baruch, Jack Welpott, Ruth Bernhard, Walter Chappell, and Edmund Teske.

In 1979, Ollman was introduced to Ansel Adams, and the following year Adams asked Ollman to teach at his Ansel Adams Yosemite Workshop. For the next three summers, Ollman taught alongside Adams and some of the most prominent photographers of the day, including Roy DeCarava, Olivia Parker, Marie Cosindas, David Kennerly, and Arnold Newman.

In 1983, Ansel Adams recommended Ollman for the position of founding director of The Museum of Photographic Arts slated for San Diego’s Balboa Park. Ollman was hired in November 1982, and the museum opened in May 1983. He served as director for twenty-three years, overseeing two capital expansion projects, development of a permanent collection numbering over 7,000 objects by 2006, and a research library of more than twenty-five thousand books and ephemera.

Ollman curated more than seventy-five exhibitions, many worldwide, including photographers of the time, such as Manuel Alvarez Bravo, Roy DeCarava, Arnold Newman, Harry Callahan, William Klein, Ruth Bernhard, Eikoh Hosoe, Graciela Iturbide, Flor Garduño, Robert Heinecken, Lee Friedlander, Garry Winogrand, James Nachtwey, Sebastiao Salgado, Susan Meiselas, Duane Michals, and Bill Brandt. He also organized exhibitions of historical figures, William Henry Fox Talbot, Samuel Bourne, Carleton Watkins, F. Holland Day, Edweard Muybridge, Alfred Stieglitz, Dorothea Lange, and Roman Vishniac.

Upon leaving the Museum of Photographic Arts in 2006, Ollman was hired as Director of the School of Art, Design, and Art History at San Diego State University, overseeing university policies, seven staff and 101 full and part-time faculty; 1,200 majors and nearly 10,000 students per year in art, design, and/or art history classes, and an MFA program with approximately 30 candidates per year.

Under his leadership and fundraising the university opened its San Diego State University Downtown Gallery. In 2011, Ollman left that position and reverted to full-time teaching. He taught both color and black and white studio classes, history of photography, and museum studies. In 2019, Ollman retired and was awarded professor emeritus status.

In 2014, Ollman joined the board of The Foundation for the Exhibition of Photography “FEP” based in Lausanne, Switzerland; Paris, France; and Minneapolis, USA. In 2016 he curated FEP’s retrospective exhibition of the Brazilian contemporary artist, Vik Muniz, which has been seen in six international venues. In 2018, he co-curated Hard Truths with David Furst of The New York Times, an exhibition of five of the finest photojournalists working for the Times, which has traveled to five venues in Europe.

Ollman has taught photography for The Fred Roberts Photography Workshops (2015-2019), in Bhutan, Kyrgyzstan, Tajikistan, India, Portugal, Mozambique, Mexico, Canada, and the U.S.

== Personal life ==
Ollman married the art critic Leah Ollman in 1987, and together they have two children.

== Awards ==
- National Endowment for the Arts Grantee
- California Arts Council
- National Endowment for the Arts, Fellow

== Publications ==
- Samuel Bourne: Images of India, Friends of Photography, Carmel, CA, 1983
- Situational Photographs, Catalogue Introduction, San Diego State University, 1984
- Victor Landweber, exhibition catalogue introduction, Museum of Photographic Arts, San Diego, CA, 1985
- Max Yavno: Poetry and Clarity, exhibition catalogue introduction, Museum of Photographic Arts, San Diego, CA, 1986
- Rosalind Solomon: Earth Rites, exhibition catalogue introduction, Museum of Photographic Arts, San Diego, CA 1986
- Arnold Newman: Five Decades, exhibition catalogue introduction, Harcourt, Brace, Jovanovich, San Diego, CA, 1986
- William Klein: An American in Paris, exhibition catalog introduction, Museum of Photographic Arts, San Diego, CA, 1987
- Parallels And Contrasts: Photographs from The Stephen White Collection; Chapter on Landscape and Architecture. Stephen White editions, 1988
- Rosalind Solomon: Photographs 1976-1987, Etherton Gallery, Tucson, AZ, catalogue introduction
- Revalaciones: The Art of Manuel Alvarez Bravo, exhibition catalogue introduction, Museum of Photographic Arts, San Diego, CA, 1990
- Other Visions/Other Realities: Mexican Photography Since 1930, Rice University Press, 1990
- Arnold Newman: Five Decades, Japanese exhibition catalogue introduction, Pacific Press Service, Tokyo, Japan, 1992
- Persona, exhibition catalogue, Museum of Photographic Arts, 1992
- Fata Morgana USA: The American Way of Life/Photomontages by Josep Renau, exhibition catalogue introduction, Museum of Photographic Arts and Instituto Valenciana Arte Moderno, Valencia, Spain, 1992
- Seduced By Life: The Art of Lou Stoumen, exhibition catalogue, introduction and essay, Museum of Photographic Arts, 1992
- Retratos Y Sueños/Portraits And Dreams: Wendy Ewald’s Photographs by Mexican Children, introduction essay of exhibition catalogue, Poloroid Corporation and Curatorial Assistance, 1993
- Portrait Of Nepal: Kevin Bubriski, introduction essay, Chronicle Books, 1993
- Horace Bristol, catalog essay, Centre de Photographie de Lectoure, France, 1995
- Points Of Entry: A Nation of Strangers, Museum of Photographic Arts, 1995
- Exhibiting Photography: Twenty Years at the Center for Creative Photography, Book essay, Center for Creative Photography, University of Arizona, Tucson, Arizona, 1996
- Kenro Izu, introductory essay, 1998
- Fragments of Document and Memory: Catalog of the 3rd International Photo-Biennale, Tokyo Metropolitan Museum of Photography, 2 essays, 1999
- The Beauty Of Darkness; Photographs by Connie Imboden, 1999
- The Model Wife, Bulfinch Press, 1999
- 100 al 2000: il Secolo della Fotoarte, Photology, Milano, essay, 2000
- Phillip Scholz Ritterman: Navigating by Light, MoPA, 2001
- Double Vision: Photographs From The Strauss Collection; Essay, University Art Museum, California State University, Long Beach, CA, 2001
- Visions of Passage: Artists, Writers and the American Scene, 2002 introduction essay, Arena Press
- First Photographs: William Henry Fox Talbot and the Birth of Photography, Museum of Photographic Arts, 2002
- Subway: Bruce Davidson, introduction to the second edition, 2003, St. Ann’s Press
- Recollections: Three Decades of Photographs; John Sexton, Forward to book, 2006, Ventana Editions, Carmel Valley, Ca.
- Piezas Selectas: Fotografias de la Coleccion del IVAM, Essay for book, Coleccionado Fotografias O El Significado De Todo, 2006, Generalitat Valenciana, Valencia, Spain
- Walking Through The World: Sandi Haber Fifield, Introduction to book, 2009, Edizioni Charta, Milano
- Arnold Newman: Master Class, book essay, 2011, Thames and Hudson, London, New York
- Dorothy Kerper-Munnely, Monograph, 2015, Introduction essay
- Vik Muniz, book, 2016, Delmonico-Prestel, New York
