= Peter Robinson (photographer) =

British sports photographer

Christopher Peter Robinson (born February 1944), known as Peter Robinson, is a British photographer known for his football images. He was FIFA's official photographer for over two decades and, in 2015, was appointed as the photography consultant to the FIFA Museum in Zurich.

== Early life and education ==
Robinson was born in February 1944, the son of a policeman and a mother (Vera Kingston) who was an Olympic swimmer. He was educated at Leicester College of Art and the Royal College of Art, where he developed a passion for photography.

== Career ==
Robinson began his professional photography career in 1965, contributing to The Football League magazine, leading to an invitation from FIFA to cover international football events. Over his extensive career, Robinson covered 13 FIFA World Cups and 10 Olympic Games, and thousands of football league matches across Britain and Europe.

His camera was not always pointing at the pitch, and he has a wider interest in crowds, fandom, and the moments other sports photographers overlook.

According to a biography of Peter Robinson, he is quoted as saying: "I smell things out. I am interested in everything that happens at a football match. Not just the big moment when the ball goes in the net. I am as excited by the sideshows as the main event."

Robinson first experimented with football photography travelling the country for the Leicester-based Football League Review magazine. His influences were American documentary photographers and British style magazines such as Nova. By 1970 his talent was sufficiently recognised for FIFA to appoint him as its official photographer, and he continued to work with the organisation for the next two-and-a-half decades. His assignments included the tragic European Cup Final at the Heysal Stadium in Brussels (1985), where crowd violence resulted in 39 fatalities.

In April 2022, an article in The New York Times / The Athletic described him as "arguably the world's greatest living soccer photographer."

== Publications ==
His photographs have been published in magazines all over the world and in more than 50 books, including two award-winning collections. In 2003, Robinson published Football Days, a monograph that became a bestseller and is regarded as a definitive work on football photography. The following year, he released 1966 Uncovered, a visual record of the 1966 World Cup. Both publications were awarded 'Illustrated Sports Book of the Year.'

As Michael Palin wrote in the foreword to Football Days (2005)

'Peter Robinson understands the heart and soul of the game. His eye is generous, caustic, thoughtful and celebratory. These photographs offer as subtle and incisive an insight into the appeal of football as you could hope to find.'

== Exhibitions and documentary ==
Robinson’s work can be found in the collections of Deutsches Historisches Museum in Berlin, Germany, Museo Historico Nacional in Buenos Aires, Argentina and The National Portrait Gallery in London, England. Robinson's work has been featured in an exhibition about The Football League Review at The Gallery at De Montfort University, Leicester (DMU) where he has also guest lectured at The FIFA Master course. This was followed by “Keep off the Grass”, a collection of 200 photographs also held at The Gallery. Art critic Waldemar Januszczak praised Robinson’s ability to capture “the quirky humanity of the beautiful game,” calling him “the greatest living football snapper” in his article in The Sunday Times.

Robinson's work was also included in The Art School Dance goes on Forever,[13] a retrospective of 1960s creative alumni from Leicester College of Art (now De Montfort University), as well as a curated selection of iconic Tottenham Hotspur photographs taken by Robinson at “Double Vision”, held at the OOF Gallery in the grounds of the Tottenham Hotspur stadium.

In June 2025, Robinson received a Lifetime Achievement Award from The Lucie Foundation in Los Angeles.

Other Exhibitions

- 1985 Beijing China at The Peoples Art Gallery – sponsored by Kodak
- This is Soccer – in August 1994 at The Association of Photographers gallery in London
- Half decent football photos at the Royal Festival Hall in London July 1996
- Das Spiel at the DHM – the German Historical Museum in Berlin – 2006

A documentary featuring Robinson's work is currently in pre-production.
