= Angkor Hospital for Children =

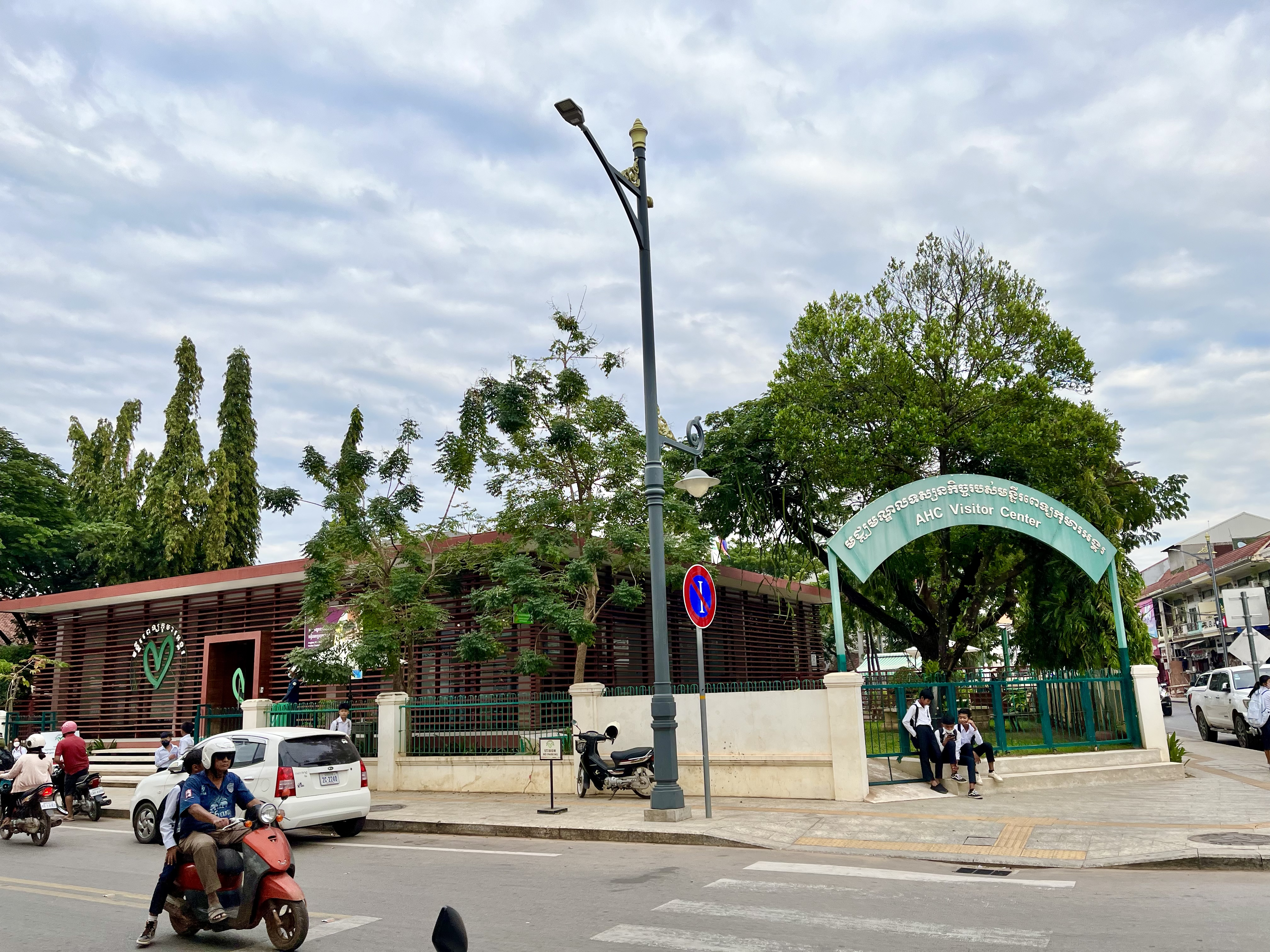

Geography
- Location: Preah Sangkhreach Tep Vong St., Siem Reap, Cambodia
- Coordinates: 13.3581°N 103.8562°E

Organisation
- Type: Specialist
- Patron: Kenro Izu

Services
- Emergency department: Yes
- Speciality: Paediatrics

History
- Opened: 1999

Links
- Website: angkorhospital.org

Angkor Hospital for Children (AHC; Khmer: មន្ទីរពេទ្យកុមារអង្គរ) is an independent, non-profit paediatric healthcare hospital and organisation located in Siem Reap, Cambodia. AHC was founded in 1999 through the efforts of a Japanese photographer Kenro Izu. The mission of AHC is to improve healthcare of Cambodia's children by creating a sustainable, replicable model of a healthcare institution in cooperation with the Cambodian government.

== Services ==
Since 1999, Angkor Hospital for Children has provided over 2.5 million medical treatments to Cambodian children and their families. In 2005, AHC was recognised as one of the few paediatric teaching hospitals in Cambodia by the Cambodian Ministry of Health.

AHC offers inpatient and outpatient care, surgical services, ER, intensive care treatment, dental care and antiretroviral HIV therapy. The hospital also has a neonatal unit, eye clinic, pharmacy, physiotherapy and radiology services, a medical laboratory and a social work program. In 2010, AHC established an affiliated Satellite Clinic located at the government-run Sotnikum Referral Hospital, approximately 35 km from Siem Reap. The AHC Satellite Clinic provides quality paediatric and neonatal healthcare to Cambodians living in rural areas, and has an ambulance transfer service to bring patients requiring intensive care to AHC in Siem Reap.

In addition to health care, AHC provides specialised paediatric education to Cambodia's medical students, nursing students and health workers from health centers, national and provincial hospitals. AHC's 3-year Paediatric Medical Residency Programme prepares the future doctors of Cambodia to practice paediatric care safely, ethically and competently. AHC also provides continuous nursing and medical education sessions for both AHC and government staff.

== Community Health Action and Engagement Department ==
In 2001, AHC established the Community Health Action and Engagement Department (CHAED). The CHAED is composed of two units: the Health Systems Strengthening Project (HSSP) and the Capacity Building and Health Education Project (CBHEP). The HSSP is an ongoing project in cooperation with the Cambodian Ministry of Health, Physicians Council and Cambodian Council of Nurses. Its goal is to develop and implement national healthcare policies, such as physician clinical practice guidelines and a nursing code of ethics. The CBHEP is composed of four complementary outreach activities that work within communities to provide health and first aid training, promote disease prevention and good health practices and increase health literacy.
