= Museum of Photographic Arts =

Museum in San Diego, California

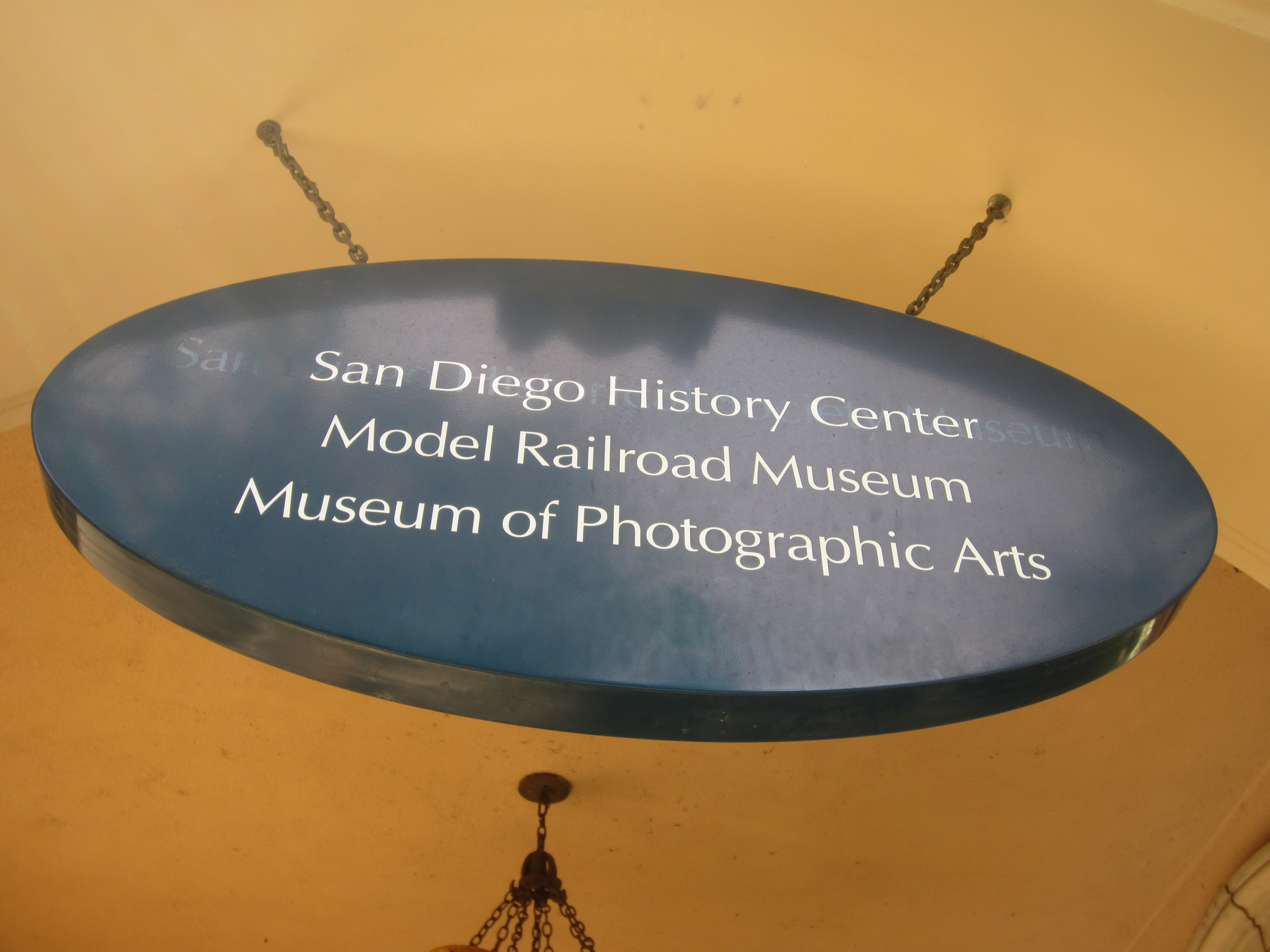

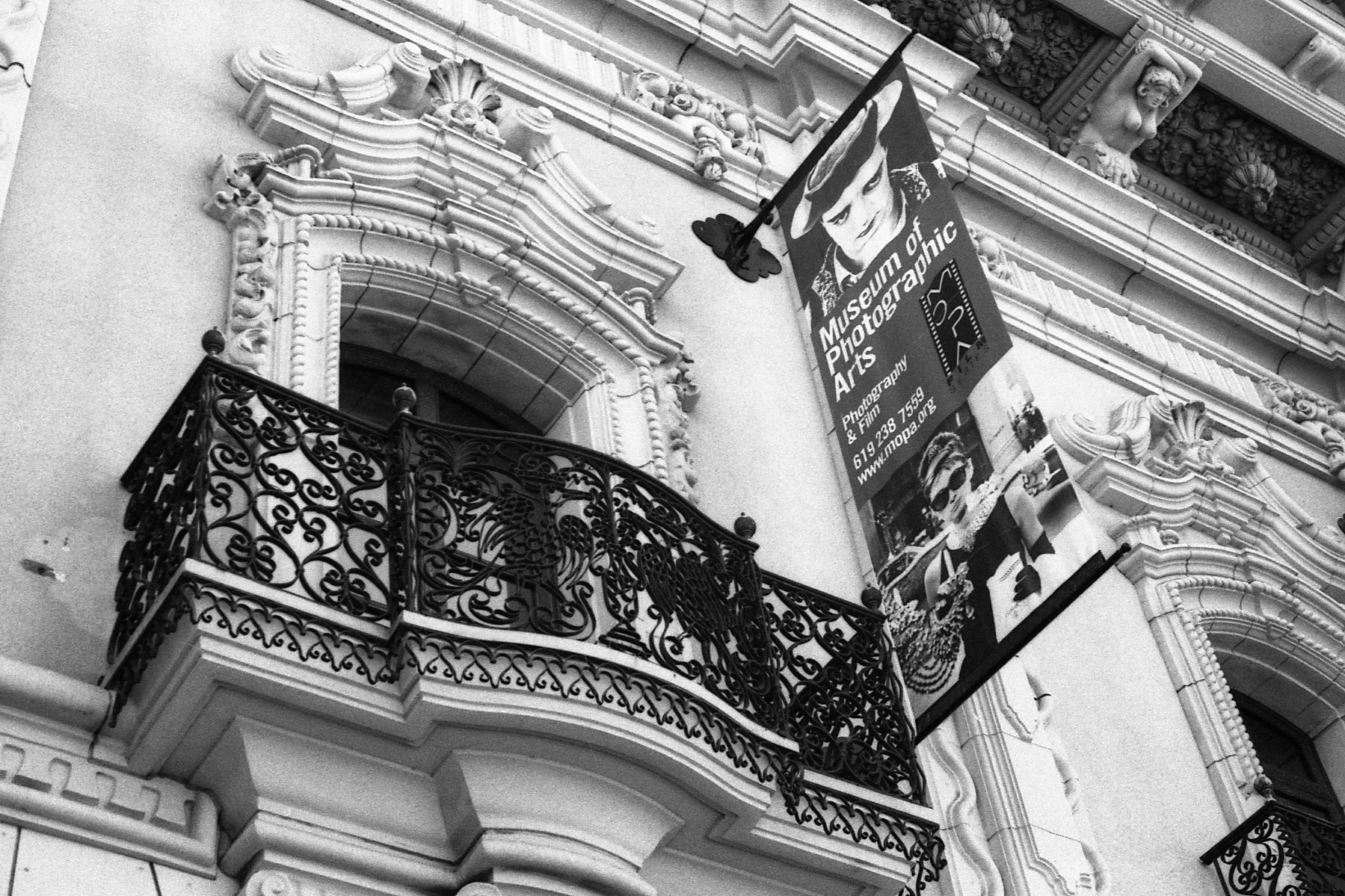
- Museum of Photographic Arts, Balboa Park, San Diego

- Location within San Diego Location within California Location within the United States
- Location: Casa de Balboa; San Diego, California, U.S.
- Coordinates: 32.731°N 117.149°W
- Website: www.mopa.org

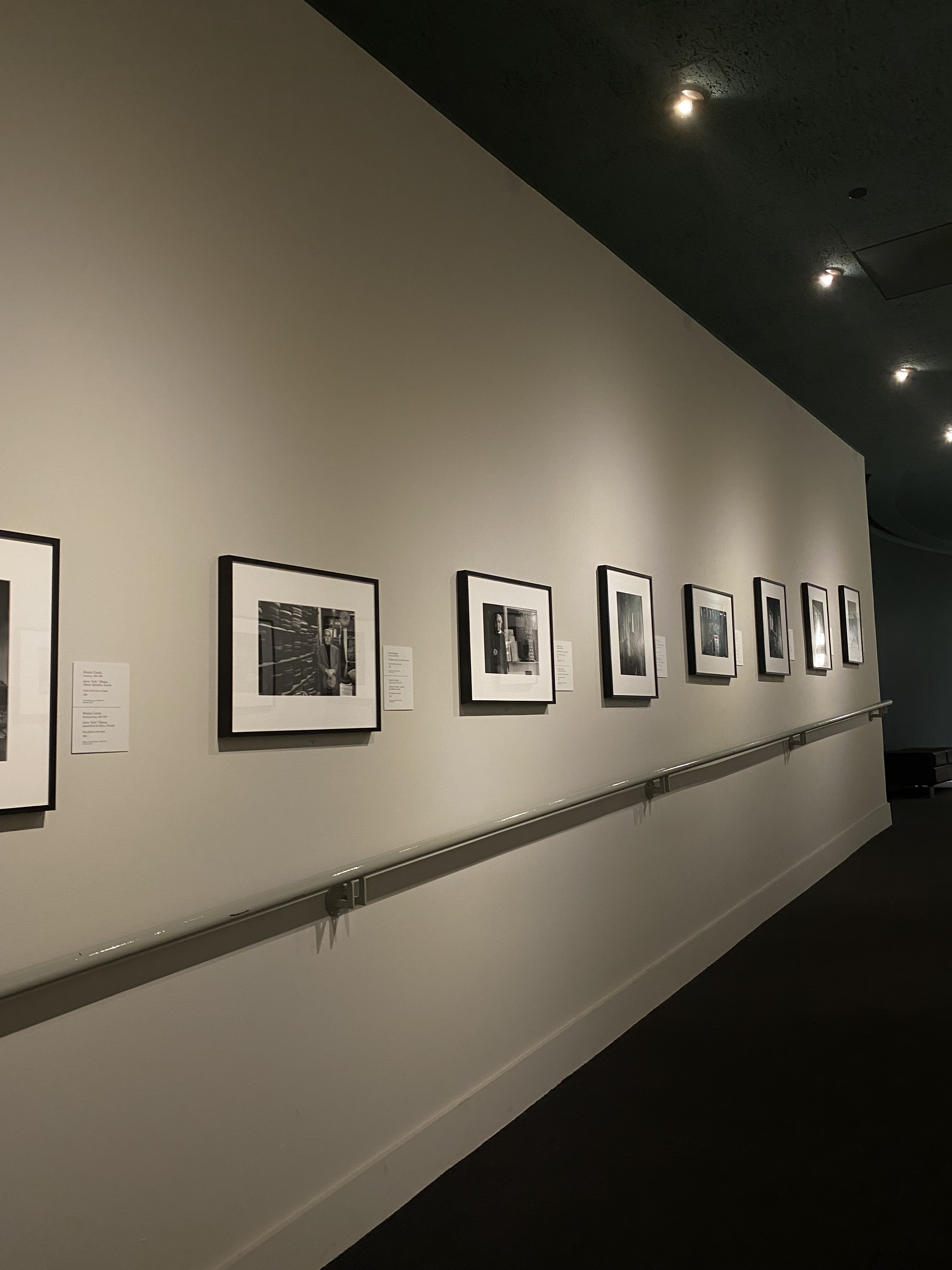
Gallery at Museum Of Photographic Arts located in Balboa Park, California

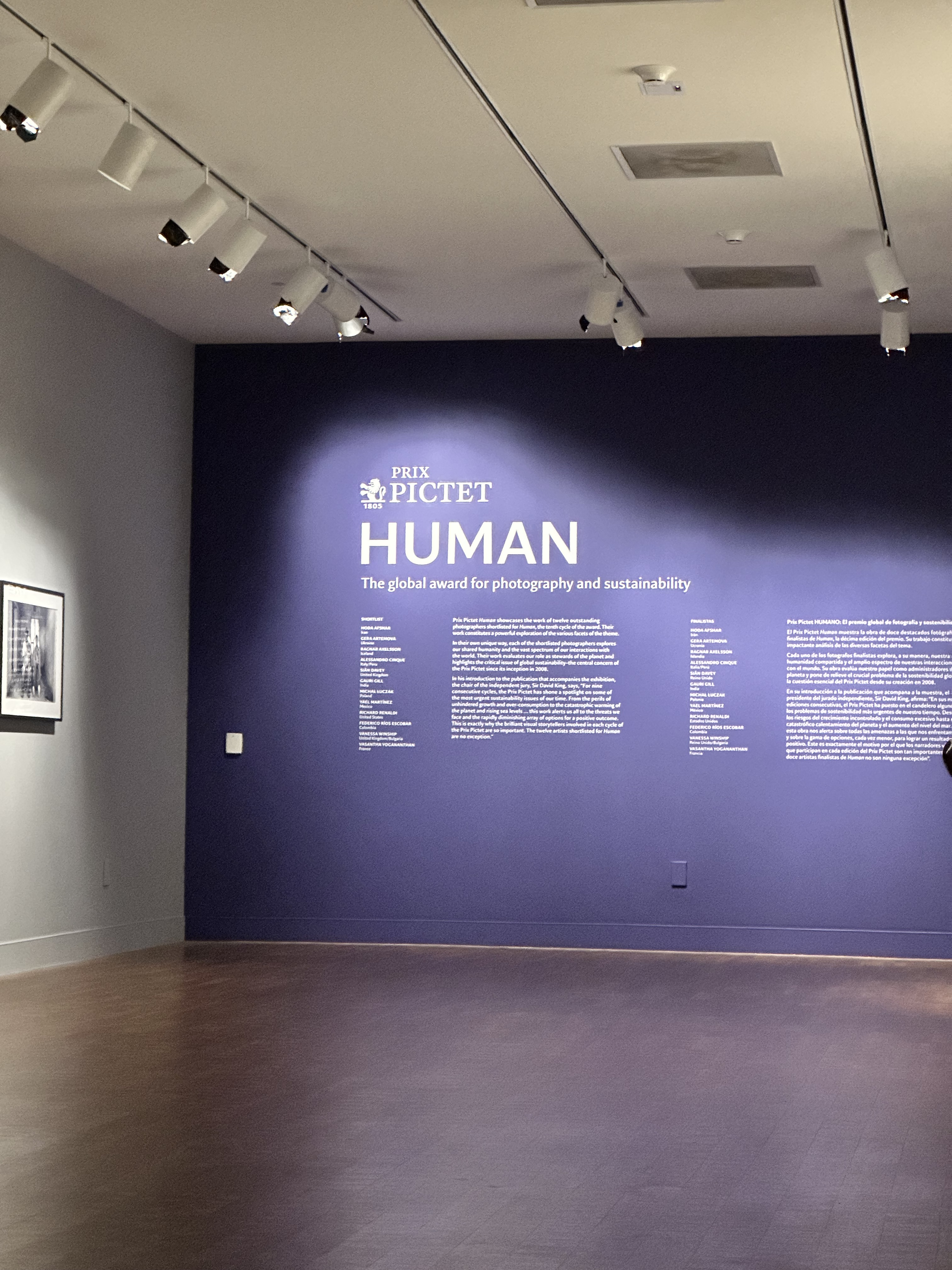
Museum of Photographic Arts

The Museum of Photographic Arts (MOPA) is a museum in Balboa Park in San Diego, California. First founded in 1974, MOPA opened in 1983. MOPA is one of three museums in the US dedicated exclusively to the collection and preservation of photography, with a mission to inspire, educate and engage the broadest possible audience through the presentation, collection, and preservation of photography, film and video. The museum's address is 1649 El Prado, San Diego, CA, 92101.

== History ==
Arthur Ollman was the museum's first executive director. Deborah Klochko is the current (2013) executive director. In March 2000, the museum re-opened to the public after a twelve-month renovation project. It expanded its gallery space and added a classroom, a theater, a print viewing room and a 20,000-volume library.

The Museum of Photographic Arts celebrated its 50th anniversary (2023). It has changed in many ways from the past, from photography development to styles, to location, and understanding.(Seth Combs) Deborah Klochko, MOPA’s executive director and chief curator, believes combining the two museums will create a better space and generate more interest. The museum now hosts a 22,000-piece art collection and contains 20 photographic exhibitions. It also talks about what the future plans of the museum will look like, and according to the article, they plan on adding more art collections, which include video portraits, Victorian-era portraits, and a vibrant large-scale photograph collection.(Pam Kragen)

Before the establishment of MOPA, It was previously devoted to a photography gallery in Balboa Park as an instrumental non-profit organization. Gradually, with other associated businesses' help, the non-profit organization was finally installed as an official museum, the Museum Of Photography Arts at Balboa Park. Commemorating what Klochko states The-40th represents the Opening of the Museum “Permanent Home”.

== Collection ==
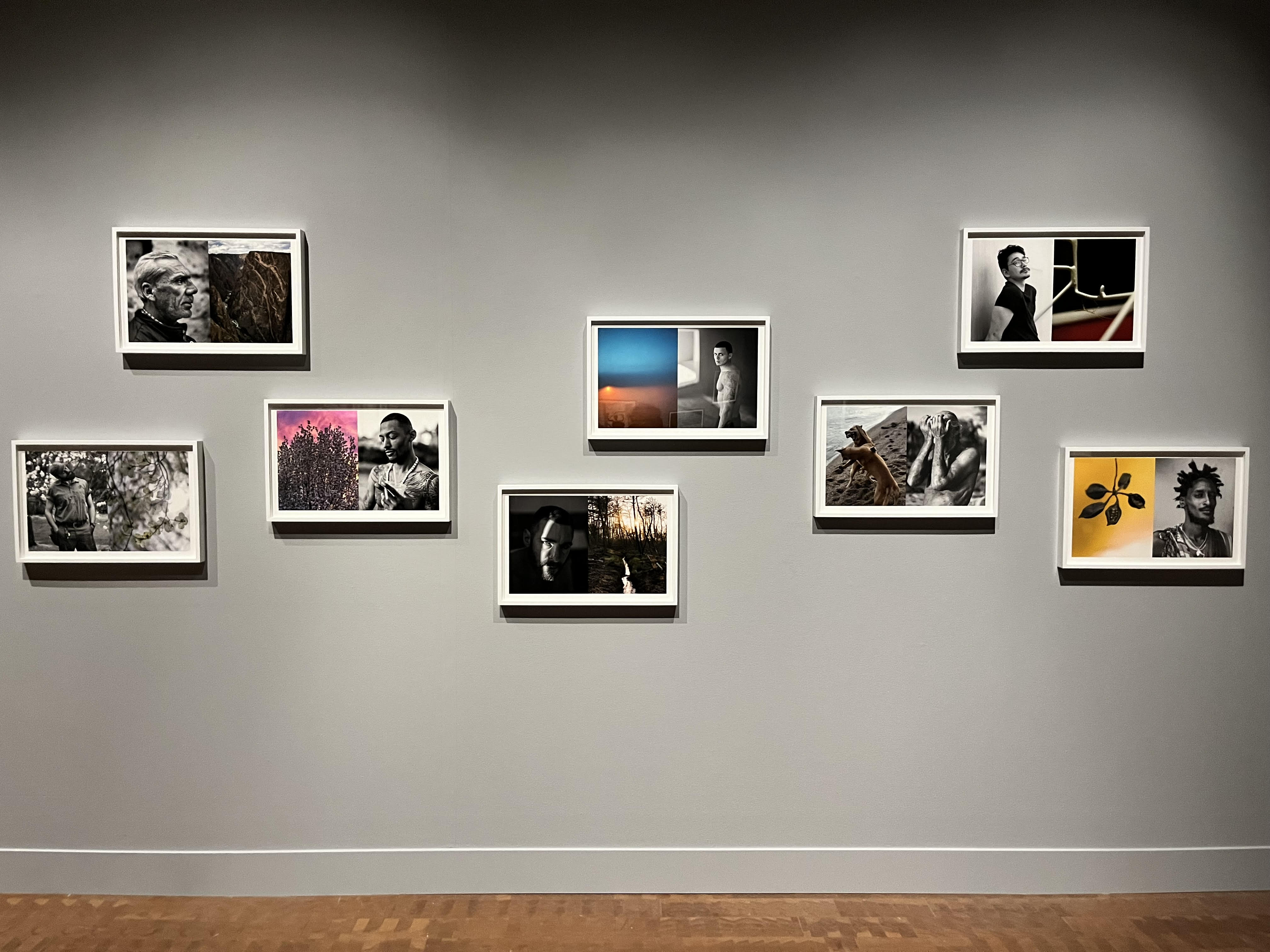
Photo Wall in Museum of Photographic Arts in Balboa Park

Over the years, MOPA has collected thousands of photographs that currently reside in the museum’s permanent collection, which includes photographs that span the history of photography. It includes collections from film maker Lou Stoumen’s estate as well as the entire Nagasaki Journey: The Photographs of Yosuke Yamahata, August 10, 1945, by Yōsuke Yamahata.
