= Todd Walker (disambiguation) =

Todd Walker may refer to:

- Todd Walker (born 1973), American former professional baseball player
- Todd Walker (cricketer) (born 1998), South African cricketer
- Todd Walker (photographer) (1917–1998), American photographer, printmaker and creator of artists' books

== See also ==
- archimania, a collective of architects and designers in Memphis, Tennessee, founded by Todd Walker and Barry Alan Yoakum
- Stephen Todd Walker (born 1966), American finance expert and author
