= Phillip Prodger =

Phillip Prodger is a museum professional, curator of works on paper, author, and art historian. He was formerly a Senior Research Scholar at the Yale Center for British Art and Head of Photographs at the National Portrait Gallery, London. Born in Margate, Kent, he currently resides outside of New Haven, Connecticut.

== Education ==
Phillip Prodger received his bachelor's degree from Williams College and his master's from Stanford University. In 2000, Prodger received his Ph.D. in history of art from University of Cambridge. He attended secondary school in Hong Kong at Hong Kong International School.

== Career ==
After a brief time as a lecturer at the Hong Kong Arts Centre, Prodger began his museum career at the Iris and B. Gerald Cantor Center for the Visual Arts at Stanford University. Later, he became Assistant Curator of Prints, Drawings and Photographs at the Saint Louis Art Museum. In 2008, he became the founding Curator of Photography at the Peabody Essex Museum and was named Head of Photographs at the National Portrait Gallery, London in 2014.

== Awards ==
- 2013: Focus Award for contributions to the appreciation and understanding of photography
- 2017: Rome Fellowship from the Paul Mellon Centre and the British School at Rome

== Research ==
Prodger's primary area of expertise is in prints, drawings, and photographs, especially European and American photography from the nineteenth century to the present. He has published extensively on topics in the history of photography, facial expression, and interactions between photography and other media. Much of his work centers on the rise of photographic vision.

Prodger has devoted much of his research to the so-called 'second invention' of photography, when wet-plate collodion supplanted Daguerreian and paper negative technologies in the 1850s-70s. During this time, it became possible to record things occurring too rapidly to be seen with the naked eye. This is the central theme of three of Prodger's books—Time Stands Still (Oxford, 2003), which analyses the work of Eadweard Muybridge in relation to contemporaneous motion photography; Darwin's Camera (Oxford, 2009), which examines Charles Darwin's interest in recording facial expressions as they occur; and Victorian Giants (National Portrait Gallery, 2018), which connects the drive for instantaneity in pictures with the rise of art photography in Britain. Prodger coined the term 'instantaneous photography movement' to describe the mania for taking photographs of rapidly occurring action in the mid- to late nineteenth century.

Prodger has also written extensively about Modern photography. He is the author of a series, so far including three books (one with Terence Pepper), on Edwardian photographer Emil Otto Hoppé, produced in collaboration with Graham Howe and the E.O. Hoppé Estate in Pasadena, California. He is also an author or co-author of books on Ansel Adams, Ernst Haas, and the partnership between Man Ray and Lee Miller.

In contemporary art, Prodger has written monographs on William Eggleston, Martin Parr, and Jerry Uelsmann. He has also written short texts for monographs by Anderson & Low, Katharine Cooper, Harold Feinstein, Sharon Harper, Anna Kuperberg, Yann Mingard, Suzanne Opton, Paul Outerbridge, Anne Rearick, and Joni Sternbach.

In 2018, he was curator and primary author of an exhibition and catalogue on early Chinese photography produced in association with Tsinghua University and the Loewentheil Collection

== Publications ==
=== Books and catalogues ===
- Illustrations of Human and Animal Expression from the Collection of Charles Darwin, Lewiston, New York and Lampeter, Wales: Edwin Mellen Press, 1998. ISBN 978-0773484672
- Time Stands Still: Muybridge and the Instantaneous Photography Movement, Oxford and New York: Oxford University Press, 2003. ISBN 978-0195149630
- Impressionist Camera: Pictorial Photography in Europe, 1888-1918, London and New York: Merrell, 2006. ISBN 978-1858943312
- Hoppé's Amerika: Modernist Photographs from the 1920s, New York and London: W. W. Norton & Co., April 2007. ISBN 978-0393065442
- Darwin's Camera: Art and Photography in the Theory of Evolution, New York and London: Oxford University Press, 2009. ISBN 978-0195150315
- Paul Outerbridge: New Color Photographs from California and Mexico, 1948-55, Portland, Oregon: Nazraeli, 2009. ISBN 978-1590052617
- The Mind's Eye: Fifty Years of Photography by Jerry Uelsmann, San Francisco: ModernBook, 2010. ISBN 978-0980104455
- Hoppé Portraits: Society, Studio, and Street, London: National Portrait Gallery, 2011. ISBN 978-1855144217
- Ernst Haas: Color Correction, Gottingen: Steidl, 2011. ISBN 978-3869301365
- Man Ray | Lee Miller: Partners in Surrealism, New York and London: Merrell Publishers, 2011. ISBN 978-1858945576
- Ansel Adams: At the Water's Edge, Salem: Peabody Essex Museum, 2012. ISBN 9780875772257
- E.O. Hoppé, The German Work 1925–1938, Gottingen: Steidl, 2015. ISBN 978-3869309378
- William Eggleston Portraits, London: National Portrait Gallery and New Haven: Yale University Press, 2016. ISBN 978-0300222524
- Victorian Giants: the Birth of Art Photography. Julia Margaret Cameron, Lewis Carroll, Clementina Hawarden, and Oscar Rejlander, London: National Portrait Gallery, 2018. ISBN 978-1855147065
- 100 Photographs (editor and introduction), London: National Portrait Gallery, 2018. ISBN 978-1855147416
- Vision and Reflection: Photographs of 19th Century China from the Loewentheil Collection, Beijing: Tsinghua University Press, 2018.
- Martin Parr: Only Human, London: Phaidon, 2019. ISBN 978-0714879895
- Face Time: A History of the Photographic Portrait, London and New York: Thames & Hudson, 2021. ISBN 978-0500544914
