= Southeast Museum of Photography =

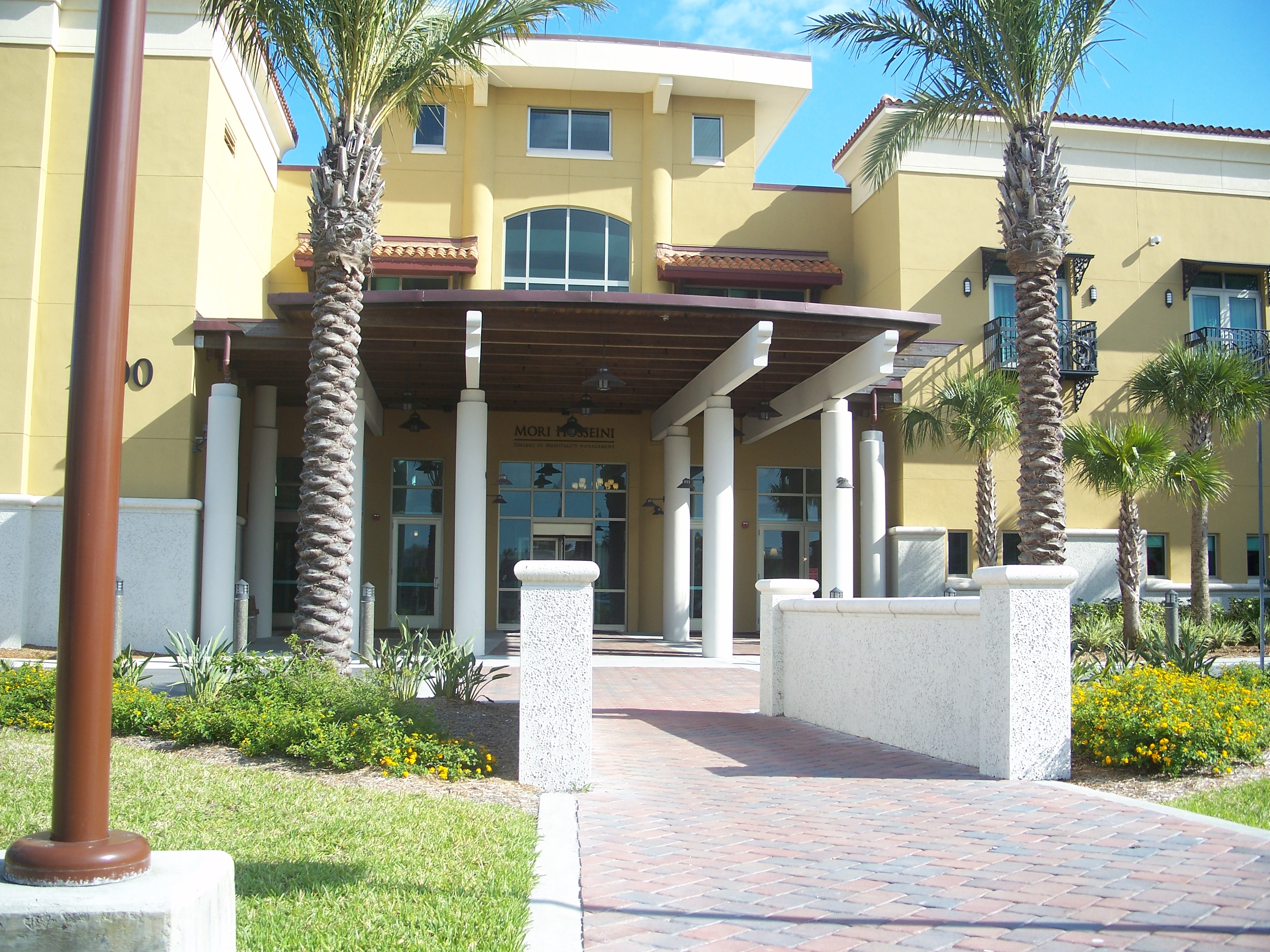

- Location within Volusia County
- Established: 1992
- Location: 1200 West International Speedway Boulevard; Daytona Beach, Florida, USA
- Coordinates: 29.20°N 81.05°W
- Type: Art
- Director: Whitney Broadaway
- Public transit access: VOTRAN
- Website: www.southeastmuseumofphotography.org

The Southeast Museum of Photography is located in Daytona Beach, Florida, on the campus of Daytona State College. It opened in 1992, and moved to a new facility (the Mori Hosseini Center) in 2007.

The museum's permanent collection has "more than 3,500 photographs and includes work by William Klein, Sally Mann, Harry Callahan, Gordon Parks, Alfred Stieglitz, Edward Steichen, Paul Strand, Aaron Siskind and Robert Rauschenberg among others." It holds approximately 20 exhibitions per year.

== Selected exhibition catalogs ==
- Blanton, Casey, and Elizabeth Edwards. 1995. Picturing paradise: colonial photography of Samoa, 1875 to 1925. [Daytona Beach, Florida]: Daytona Beach Community College. ISBN 1-887040-14-5
- Saiga, Yuji, and Noriko Fuku. 1996. Land of paradox. [Daytona Beach, Florida]: Daytona Beach Community College. ISBN 1-887040-16-1
- Parks, Gordon, Deborah Willis, and Leonard Richard Lempel. 1999. Midway: portrait of a Daytona Beach neighborhood: photographs by Gordon Parks. [Daytona Beach, Florida]: Southeast Museum of Photography at Daytona Beach Community College. ISBN 1-887040-26-9
- Cowin, Eileen, Jay Belloli, and Sue Spaid. 2000. Eileen Cowin, work 1971–1998: still (and all). Pasadena, California: Armory Center for the Arts. ISBN 1-893900-01-0
- Fichter, Robert. 2000. Florida photogenesis: the work of creative and experimental photographers in Florida. Tallahassee, Florida: Florida State University Museum of Fine Arts, School of Visual Arts & Dance. ISBN 1-889282-09-X
- Harris, Alex, and Lillian Guerra. 2007. The idea of Cuba. Albuquerque: University of New Mexico Press. ISBN 978-0-8263-4139-6
- Kertész, André, Robert Gurbo, and Eelco Wolf. 2007. Andre Kertesz: the polaroids. New York: W.W. Norton. ISBN 978-0-393-06564-0
