= Saiga (surname) =

Saiga (written: 斎賀, 齋賀 or 雑賀) is a Japanese surname. Notable people with the surname include:

- Fumiko Saiga (齋賀 富美子, 1943–2009), Japanese diplomat
- Mitsuki Saiga (斎賀 みつき, born 1973), Japanese voice actress and singer
- Yūji Saiga (雑賀 雄二, born 1951), Japanese photographer
