= Anderson & Low =

Photographer duo

Jonathan Anderson & Edwin Low, known as Anderson & Low are fine art photographers who have been collaborating since 1990.

Anderson & Low are recognised for their studies of athletes and for projects about costume and identity, which have been exhibited worldwide. These include: Road to 2012, Athletes, Circus, Gymnasts/NDGT, Athlete/Warrior, Endure - they are the only artists ever to be given unrestricted access to depict how the Chinese elite gymnasts train for the Olympics; and Manga Dreams - exploring concepts of identity and the influence of Asian comic books on youth culture.

Anderson & Low's work includes portraiture, architectural studies, abstract images, reportage, nudes, and landscape and is noted for attention to concept, form, lighting and printing.

Their works reside in: The Metropolitan Museum of Art, New York; Victoria & Albert Museum, London, UK; National Portrait Gallery (Australia); National Portrait Gallery, London; Museum of Fine Arts, Houston, Houston, Texas; High Museum of Art, Atlanta, Georgia; The Baltimore Museum of Art; The Science Museum London, UK; Akron Art Museum, Akron, Ohio; National Gallery of Australia, Canberra, Australia; the US Olympic Center; the Southeast Museum of Photography, Daytona, Florida; Maison Européenne de la Photographie, Paris, France; Brandts Museum of Photographic Art, Odense, Denmark.

September 2015, Anderson & Low were awarded an Honorary Fellowship of the Royal Photographic Society.

March 2017, Anderson & Low exhibition 'Voyages', was premiered at the Science Museum, London. To create this project, Anderson & Low created painting-like images of the museum's historic collection of model ships, making the models resemble real ships at sea.

June 2017, Anderson & Low presented a TEDx talk titled 'Sharpening Your Senses'.

== Publications ==
- VOYAGES: Lucky Panda Press, 2017 ISBN 978-0955899782
- On the Set of James Bond's SPECTRE: Hatje Cantz, 2016 ISBN 978-3775741989
- City of Mines: Dewi Lewis Publishing, 2015 ISBN 978-1907893773
- The Queen's Backyard: Dewi Lewis Publishing, 2015 ISBN 978-1907893704
- Black Sand - Surfers in Taiwan: Lucky Panda Press, 2014 ISBN 978-0955899744
- ENDURE - An intimate Journey with the Chinese Gymnasts: Serindia Publications, 2012 ISBN 978-1932476583
- Family Intimacies: NuS Museum, Singapore 2012
- Manga Dreams: Lucky Panda Press, 2011 ISBN 978-0955899720
- Champions - to benefit the Elton John AIDS Foundation: Lucky Panda Press, 2008 ISBN 978-0955899713
- Circus: Lucky Panda Press, 2008 ISBN 978-0955899706
- Athlete/Warrior: Merrell Publishers Ltd, 2005 ISBN 978-1858942919
- Gymnasts: Twin Palms Publishing, 2002 ISBN 978-1931885010
- Athletes: Twin Palms Publishing, 2002 ISBN 978-1931885041

== Collections ==
USA

- Metropolitan Museum of Art, New York, New York, USA
- Museum of Fine Arts, Houston, Texas, USA
- High Museum of Art, Atlanta, Georgia, USA
- The Baltimore Art Museum, Baltimore, Maryland, USA
- Worcester Museum, Worcester, Massachusetts, USA
- South East Photography Museum, Daytona Beach, Florida, USA
- Akron Art Museum, Akron, Ohio, USA
- Colorado Springs Fine Art Center, Colorado Springs, Colorado, USA
- United States Olympic Center, Colorado Springs, Colorado, USA
- Palm Springs Art Museum, Palm Springs, California, USA
- Hood Museum of Art, Dartmouth College, New Hampshire, USA

UK

- Victoria & Albert Museum, London, UK
- National Portrait Gallery, London, UK
- Sainsbury Centre for Visual Arts, Norwich, UK
- The Science Museum, London, UK

France

- Maison Européenne de la Photographie, Paris, France

Denmark

- Brandts Museet Fotokunst, Odense, Denmark

Australia

- National Gallery of Australia, Canberra, Australia
- National Portrait Gallery, Canberra, Australia

Malaysia

- Balai Seni Lukis Negara (National Art Gallery) Kuala Lumpur, Malaysia
