= Betty Hahn =

American photographer (born 1940)

- Born: October 11, 1940 (age 86); Chicago, Illinois, U.S.
- Education: Henry Holmes Smith, Nathan Lyons; Indiana University Bloomington (BFA, 1963; MFA, 1966}
- Occupation: Photographer
- Known for: Experimental photographic methods, mixed media

Betty Hahn (born 1940) is an American photographer known for working in alternative and early photographic processes. She completed both her BFA (1963) and MFA (1966) at Indiana University Bloomington. Initially, Hahn worked in other two-dimensional art mediums before focusing on photography in graduate school. She is well-recognized due to her experimentation with photographic methods that incorporate different forms of media. By transcending traditional concepts of photography, Hahn challenges the viewer not only to assess the content of the image, but also to contemplate the photographic object itself.

== Biography ==
Betty Hahn was born on October 11, 1940, in Chicago, Illinois, where she also grew up. At the age of 10, Hahn was given her first camera by an aunt. Hahn later on went to graduate from Scecina Memorial Catholic High School. Soon afterwards, she enrolled with a full scholarship at Indiana University, where she furthered her studies in Fine Arts, receiving both her BFA (1963) and her MFA (1966). Throughout her undergraduate years, she concentrated in drawing and painting; however, as she entered graduate study, she worked in photography. During this important developmental period, Hahn studied under one of the most well-known photography teachers of the time, Henry Holmes Smith, who encouraged Hahn's work in alternative processes.

Once she graduated, Hahn moved to Rochester where she taught at the Rochester Institute of Technology until 1975. Hahn then relocated to Albuquerque where she was professor at University of New Mexico until her retirement in 1997.

== Work ==
Hahn is best known for her explorations of alternative processes in photography, using both older methods of darkroom developing such as gum-bichromate and cyanotypes, with other art mediums, including hand-painting and even embroidery. She is noted as one of the first photographers to successfully integrate such a variety of art mediums.

Hahn encourages the viewer to think more deeply through not only the use of different physical processes in her artwork, but also through the multiplicity of meanings in her photographs. In most of her work, Hahn integrates humor and irony as she explores the meanings generated by formal combinations. Some of her prints include the sprocket holes of the 35mm negative, which allude to its 35mm film origins: but by hand coloring with bright paints, she draws attention to the mixture of craft with industrial mediums.

Once she started experimenting with the gum-bichromate process, Hahn started stitching into her photographs. Printing onto canvas and other fabrics allowed her to use thread to highlight certain aspects of the photograph. In combining her photographs with conventional practices, Hahn successfully intertwines formal and conceptual aspects. Not only does she speak to the mundane tasks of everyday life, but also about routine and normativity. In highlighting the ordinary in her work, Hahn elevates and revives that which has been lost in the practice of daily life. Embroidery references femininity, as Hahn underlines the feminist issue of the anonymity of women's handicraft. Her embroidery often emphasized flowers with its three-dimensionality, furthering the idea of femininity; she later on pursued this as a symbol and incorporated it in several of her other series.

== Art and Feminism ==
In her work, Hahn delivers a powerful message in regards to women and embroidery. It is quite evident through time that women's labor is needlework, and that their labor is frequently undervalued as craft both when dissimilar and alike to men's work. In a time period where men overshadowed women in the traditional art, such as painting and sculpture, women oftentimes reverted to other mediums such as textiles.

It has been suggested that women's work, especially in embroidery, is of little value in the art field since it is considered a craft. Since "arts and crafts" are more often than not paired together, it is obvious they are in the same category; however, there is a clear distinction. For 300 years, women have been taught needlework through practice and tradition, and in inadvertently, promoted obedience and household effeminate behavior. As a result, instead of regarding stitching as an art, many viewed it as a thoughtless skill, lacking originality. On the contrary, however, it is far more than evident that the hand of woman is more than a mindless and conforming thing, it is one of sensitivity, thought, patience, perseverance, and strength. By incorporating embroidery and stitching, Hahn pushes the audience to acknowledge the work of women not as craft or tradition, but as meticulous, creative and unique.

== Exhibitions ==
The Division of Photographic History at the Smithsonian Institution exhibited Hahn's work in a group exhibit in the 1960s as a part of a developing series of displaying the works of women photographers. Afterwards her work was featured in multiple thematic exhibitions at the Smithsonian.

Hahn's first solo show exhibiting her work was in 1973 at the Witkin Gallery in New York City. Thereafter, she received several grants from the National Endowment for the Arts in 1974, 1978, and 1983 to continue her work in explorative photography.

Hahn's art has been exhibited throughout the country and worldwide featured in museums highlighting historical processes in Baltimore, Maryland (1972), and nature photography exhibitions in Osaka, Japan (1990). Her work has been displayed at the Albuquerque Museum of Art and Art History (2017), Phoenix Art Museum (2015), and the George Eastman House (2012, 2016). Hahn's work is held in private collectors, galleries, and in permanent museum collections, including the San Francisco Museum of Modern Art, Center for Creative Photography and the Museum of Modern Art.

=== Exhibitions ===
- 1996 – George Eastman House International Museum of Photography and film, Rochester, New York
- 1997 – A History of Women Photographers, Akron Art Museum
- 1997 – Eye of the Beholder, Photographs of the Avon Collection, International Center of Photography, Midtown, New York City
- 1998 – Passing Shots: A Travel Series, University of New Mexico Art Museum, Albuquerque, New Mexico
- 1998 – The City Series, Taos, Albuquerque, Santa Fe, Cedar Rapids Museum of Art, Cedar Rapids, Iowa
- 1999 – Photography Or Maybe Not, a Betty Hahn traveling retrospective, Mikhailovsky Palace, St. Petersburg, Russia
- 2000 – 20/20 Twentieth Century Photographic Acquisitions by 20 leading patrons, Museum of New Mexico, Museum of Fine Arts
- 2000 – Photography Or Maybe Not, a Betty Hahn traveling retrospective, Santa Fe de Granada, Spain
- 2001 – In the Eyes of the Beholder: Ten Photographers View Albuquerque, The University of New Mexico Hospital, Albuquerque, New Mexico
- 2002 – Sun Works Contemporary Alternative Photography, The Art Institute of Boston
- 2002 – Flowers from the Permanent Collection, The Albuquerque Museum, Albuquerque, New Mexico
- 2004 – 30th Anniversary Permanent Collection Exhibition, New Mexico State, University Art Gallery, Las Cruces, New Mexico
- 2005 – New Mexico State University Art Gallery, Las Cruces, New Mexico
- 2005 – Ace in the Hole, the legacy of Peter Walch, University Art Museum, University of New Mexico, Albuquerque, New Mexico
- 2006 – The collectible moment, Norton Simon museum, Pasadena, California
- 2006 – The Social Lens, University of Virginia Art Museum, Charlottesville, Virginia
- 2007 – Seeing Ourselves: Masterpieces of American Photography, A Traveling
- 2007 – Exhibition, George Eastman House, Rochester, New York
- 2008 – Flower Power: a Subversive Botanical, New Mexico Museum of Art, Santa Fe, New Mexico
- 2008 – Bernalillo County Arts Board Gallery, One Civic Plaza Northwest, Albuquerque, New Mexico
- 2008 – Giving Shelter 516 Arts Albuquerque, New Mexico (A Sister Exhibition to the Cradle Project)
- 2008 – Betty Hahn, Joyce Neimanas, and Judith Golden, Harwood Art Center, Albuquerque, New Mexico
- 2009 – Through the Lens: Creating Santa Fe, Palace of the Governors, The New Mexico History Museum, Santa Fe, New Mexico
- 2009 – Altered Land: Photography in the 1970s, Sheldon Museum of Art, University of Nebraska, Lincoln, Nebraska
- 2010 – Sole Mates Cowboy Boots & Art, New Mexico Museum of Art
- 2010 – Rock Scissors Paper, Anderson Contemporary Arts, Albuquerque, New Mexico
- 2010 – Recollection 2010, Works from the Colorado Photographic Arts Center, The Central Library, Vida Ellison Gallery, Denver, Colorado
- 2012 – 60 From the 60's (an exhibit of influential photos from the 1960s) George Eastman House, Rochester, New York
- 2012 – Albuquerque Now-Fall and Albuquerque Now-Winter, The Albuquerque Museum of Art and History, Albuquerque, New Mexico
- 2013 – It's About Time: 14,000 Years of Art in New Mexico, The New Mexico Museum of Art, Albuquerque, New Mexico
- 2014 – Alternative Lineage – Honoring Betty Hahn; 5 Decades of Mentoring
- 2014 – Alternative Photographic Processes, Center for Photographic Art Carmel, California
- 2014 – Alternative Lineage, Northlight Gallery, Arizona State University, Tempe, Arizona
- 2014 – Transformational Imagemaking, Handmade Photography Since 1960
- 2014 – An Exhibition Curated by Robert Hirsch, CEPA Gallery, Buffalo, New York
- 2014 – Museum Project, dnj Gallery, Santa Monica, California
- 2014 – American Heritage Center and Art Museum, University of Wyoming, Laramie, Wyoming
- 2014 – Hubbard Museum of the American West, Ruidoso, New Mexico
- 2015 - One-Of-A-Kind, unique photographic objects from the Center of Creative Photography, University of Arizona, Tucson, Arizona
- 2015 – Unconfined – Empowering Women Through Art, African American Performing Arts Center, New Mexico Expo, Albuquerque, New Mexico
- 2015 – Visualizing Albuquerque: Art of Central New Mexico, Albuquerque Museum, Albuquerque, New Mexico
- 2015 – Healing ... For the Time Being, A mixed media exhibition in conjunction with On the Map: Albuquerque Art and Design, Jonathan Abrams Maryland
- 2015 – The AIPAD Photography Show, Represented by Joseph Bellows Gallery, New York, New York
- 2016 – Transformational Imagemaking, traveling exhibition March-16- April 16; Muhlenberg College, Allentown, Pennsylvania
- 2016 – Fall-Rochester Institute of Technology, Bevier Gallery, Rochester, New York
- 2016 – 60 from the 60's: Selections from the George Eastman Museum, At the Hyde Collection, Glens Falls, New York
- 2016 – Transcendent Photography Betty Hahn and Patrick Nagatani Albuquerque/Bernalillo County Government Center, One Civic Plaza, Albuquerque, New Mexico
- 2016 – Look Inside: New Photographic Acquisitions, University of Texas Ransom Center, Austin, Texas
- 2016 – Light Works: A Century of Great Photography, Muscarelle Museum of Art, The College of William and Mary, Williamsport, Virginia
- 2016 – After Modernism, Beyond the Medium, Museum of New Mexico Museum of Fine Arts, Santa Fe, New Mexico
- 2016 – A History of Photography, The George Eastman Museum, History of Photography Gallery, Rochester, New York

== Awards ==
- National Endowment for the Arts Photographers Fellowship, $25,000
- National Endowment for the Arts Photographers Fellowship, $10,000
- New York State Council for the Arts $5,000
- Garner, Gretchen. Disappearing witness: change in twentieth-century American photography. JHU Press, 2003.
- Harrison, Joan. "Colour in the gum-bichromate process: A uniquely personal aesthetic." History of Photography 17.4 (1993): pages 369–376.
