= Todd Walker (photographer) =

American photographer (1917–1998)

Todd Walker (1917 – September 13, 1998) was an American photographer, printmaker and creator of artists' books who is known for his manipulated images and for his use of offset lithography to produce individual prints and limited-edition books of his work.

== Early life ==
Walker was born in Utah and grew up in Los Angeles. His father died when he was 14, and he struggled to find a place to belong in life. As a teenager he earned money painting backdrops on movie sets, and he learned to study tonalities when called upon to paint the faux finish on the fireplace in the movie Citizen Kane so it would render properly in black-and-white. He also used this time to learn about color mixing by combining leftover paints at the end of the day to create new hues.

== Early photographic career ==
Walker began to learn photography some time in the late 1930s, and after World War II he established a commercial photography studio in Los Angeles. Through most of the 1950s he was in high demand for his creative advertising work that featured striking visual images and intense colors. During this time he began creating a series of highly distinctive nudes that used the Sabattier effect to meld form and surface together. He also spent much time studying the traditional collotype printing process, and he was the most prominent of a new breed of photographers who helped revive the popularity of this process.

== Thumbprint Press ==
In 1964 his wife gave him a small offset press, and he began to create and publish small editions of books using photolithography to reproduce his own works. He set up his own printing house, the Thumbprint Press, at a time when there was no desktop publishing. His involvement led him to explore the chemistry and mechanics of the offset process in detail, and he experimented at length by doing such things as changing the patterns of the printing dots and overprinting images with multiple colors to achieve extraordinary saturation. He was known to have used as many as 35 colors on one image in a medium that traditionally used a standard set of only four colors.

== Teaching career and colleagues ==
Walker began teaching at the Art Center College of Design in Los Angeles in 1966. His interest in creative photographic processes brought him to the attention of Robert Heinecken and Robert W. Fichter at UCLA, and the three co-taught classes for a brief time. In 1970 Walker accepted a one-year teaching position at the University of Florida. There he worked with photographers Jerry Uelsmann and Douglas Prince as well as printmaker Ken Kerslake, who was at that time using photo-etching techniques in intaglio printmaking. Walker taught a photo-printmaking class and a silkscreen class. In an interview in the late 1970s Walker said, "The contact with the ideas of the printmaker have greatly altered my attitudes toward photography, and how each discipline deals with an image." Seven years later he moved to Tucson and taught at the University of Arizona before retiring in 1985.

== Late digital work ==
While in Arizona, Walker began working with some of the first Apple computers, and he used his technical skills to create some early 3D images of his work and to create a book in which the text was mostly generated by the computer (Enthusiasm Strengthens, 1987). According to his daughter, Walker never used Photoshop or other commercial imaging software. He wrote his own computer programs and later made use of software primarily designed for cartography. With these techniques he was able to create digital works that blurred, inverted and obscured the original image, making it into an expressive rather than detailed representation of reality.

Walker died of cancer in 1998.

== Publications ==
- How Would It Feel to Be Able to Dance Like This?, 1967
- For Nothing Changes: Democritus, on the Other Side, Burst Out A-Laughing, Photographs by Todd Walker with excerpts from "Anatomy of Melancholy" by Robert Burton (1577–1640). Published by Todd Walker, 1976.
- Ri is for Rock, 1986
- Enthusiasm Strengthens, Tucson, Arizona (Thumbprint Press?), 1987
- The Story of an Abandoned Shack in the Desert, 1995 (Reprinted by Nazraeli Press as An Abandoned Shack, 2000)
