= Darkroom manipulation =

Photography method

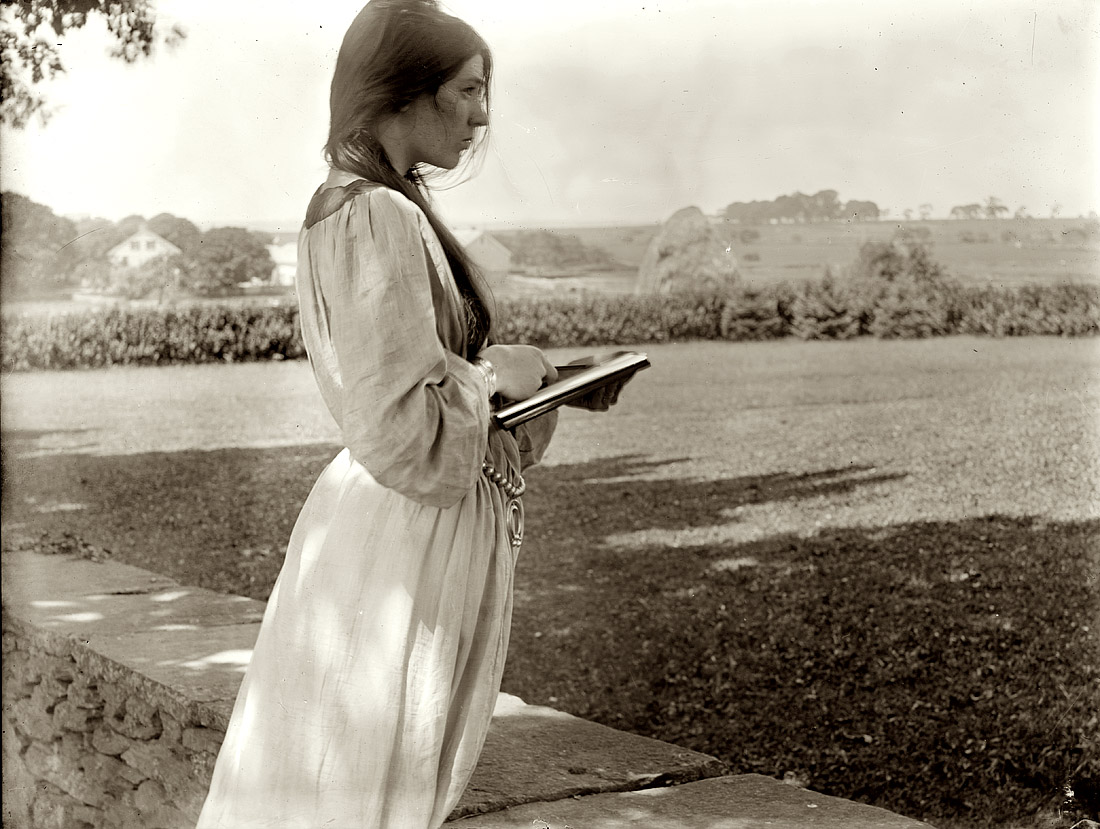
Original (from glass plate negative, U.S. Library of Congress)

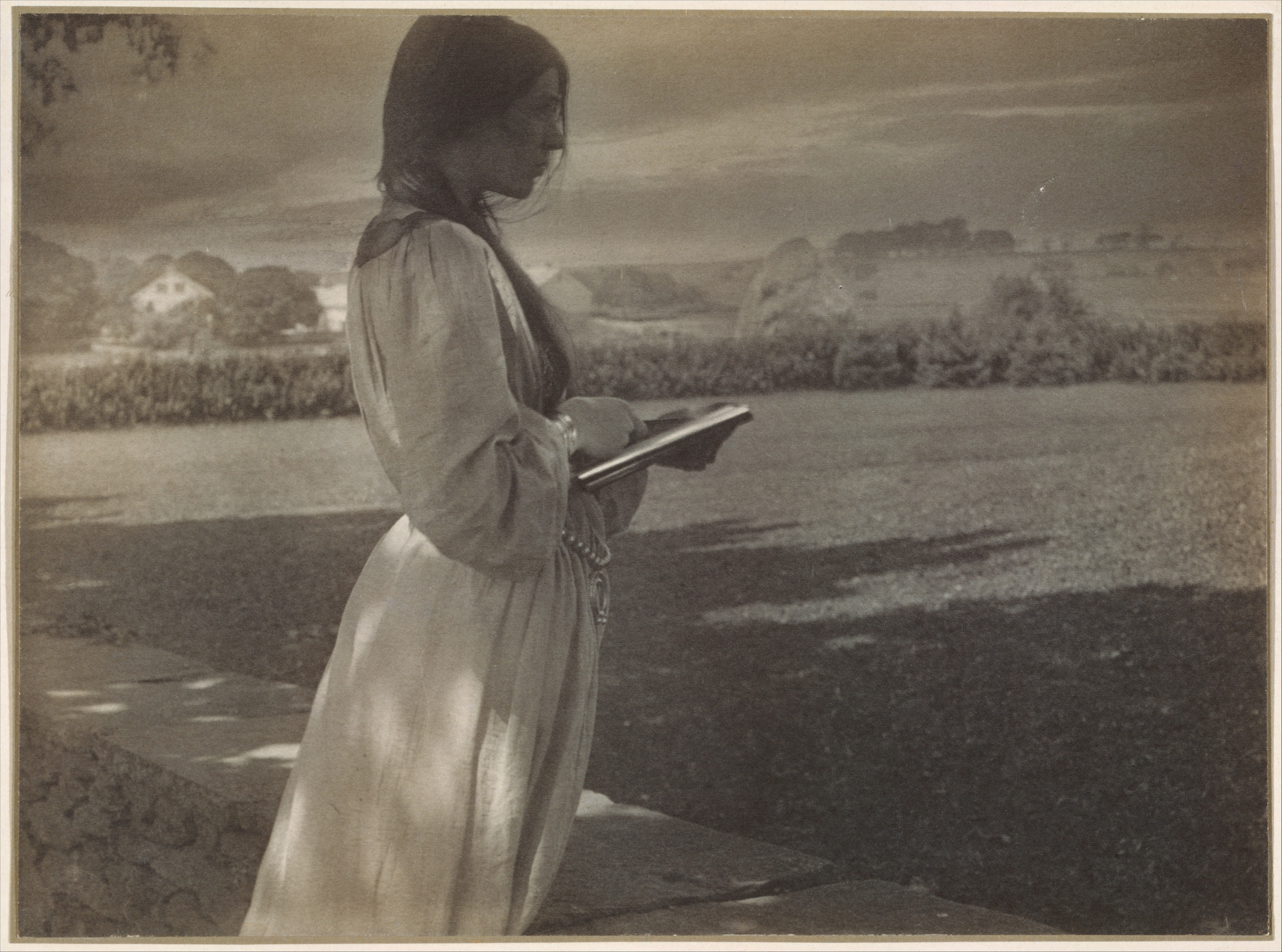
Final version: "With its central focus on the artist’s paper, the brightest detail in the scene [this photograph] draws our attention to Käsebier's own feeling that the act of creation is a source of wonder and of endless possibilities."

Use of darkroom manipulation (The Sketch by Gertrude Käsebier, 1903)

Darkroom manipulation is a traditional method of manipulating photographs without the use of computers. Some of the common techniques for darkroom manipulation are dodging, burning, and masking, which though similar conceptually to digital manipulations, involve physical rather than virtual techniques. Darkroom manipulations are those processes used, for example, to remove unwanted areas and change image background, among others. Varying techniques can be used to accomplish the same tasks.

== History ==
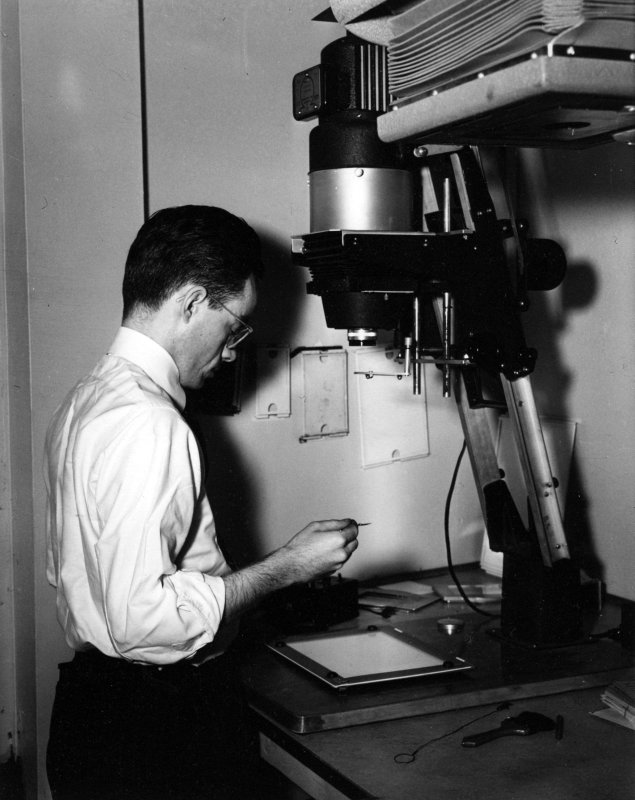
Man using an object to dodge (create a shadow) to adjust the amount of light hitting the print from the enlarger

Photo manipulation started in the darkroom in the 1860s when searching for a heroic image of U.S. President Abraham Lincoln. An unidentified artist appended the statesman's head to the body of John C. Calhoun. One of the modern American masters of darkroom manipulation is Jerry Uelsmann. To get his final product, he uses up to twelve enlargers at a time. Jerry Uelsmann seeks to reach a level of surrealist imagery of the unfathomable. He still uses this process today, as do other photographers.

=== Jerry Uelsmann ===
Jerry Uelsmann was best known for manipulating images in the darkroom long before Photoshop was available. He started off with photography in high school as a hobby and then decided to go to an institution to learn photography. Uelsmann's photographs are different from those of most photographers because he uses multiple negatives to produce one picture. He started with one enlarger but after waiting for some prints to dry one day, he decided to use more enlargers to get more images quickly, then began using seven enlargers at one time. His darkroom style allowed him to create images that had realism and the motion of what would be seen in dreams.

== Techniques ==
Before Photoshop, dodging and burning were used to lighten or darken a part of the photograph to get better details in highlights and shadows. Toning changes the color of the photograph. Black and white photographs can be changed to sepia, red, orange and even blue. Toning can be used to help make the photograph last long. Cropping is used to decide what is left out in the final print.

=== Dodging ===
Dodging

Dodging is a very important part of the manipulation process. Dodging holds back exposure in order to make it lighter. Dodging can be used by hand or specific tools such as black cardboard or opaque materials so that shadows can lighten the image. Dodging is best when used in a circular motion on the image to get the desired result.

=== Burning ===
Burning

Burning is when the image receives more exposure so the image can darken. Just like dodging, burning can be done by hand or by using objects that controls the size and shape of the area. To avoid a very obvious change between the burned-in area and the rest of the image, the device must stay in motion. Burning is a longer process because it needs a longer exposure and time to change the image.

=== Masking ===
Image Masking is a very faint positive image that comes from the original negative image. Masking in darkroom photography can be used with more than one mask for the image by putting the original image and the mask together to come out with the single print. The advantages of masking is that this process sharpens the image and if done correctly, the contrast of the image could change when the image prints out. The mask is a copy of the original, so the edges should line up correctly and density can be shown in the original negative. Masking can give slight texture so that true blacks and shadows look properly dark.

== Manipulation used today ==
Photo manipulation is used today in place of darkroom manipulation. Today, photo manipulation can be started on a photographer's camera by formatting the image into either a JPEG or RAW format. An example of manipulation with the camera itself is automatic red-eye removal in the image. After the image is on the computer many other photo editing programs such as Photoshop are used for photo manipulation.

== See also ==
- In-camera effect
