= Robert W. Fichter =

American photographer

Robert Witten Fichter (30 December 1939 – 10 June 2023) was an American photographer. Beginning in the 1960s, Fichter was at the forefront of experimental photography; combining drawing, hand photoengraving processes and photographic images in his photographic practice. Fichter has had more than forty solo exhibitions, including a major retrospective, Robert Fichter: Photography and Other Questions, in 1982.

== Biography ==
Born in Fort Myers, Florida, he attended the University of Florida, Gainesville, where he studied under Jerry Uelsmann, Ken Kerslake and Jack Nicholsen and received his Bachelor of Fine Arts in 1963. He continued his studies under Henry Holmes Smith at Indiana University Bloomington earning a Masters of Fine Arts in 1966.

In 1966, Fichter moved to Rochester, New York and worked as an Assistant Curator of Exhibitions at George Eastman House International Museum of Photography working under Nathan Lyons. In 1969, Nathan Lyons founded Visual Studies Workshop, a non-profit education and media arts center with which Fichter would maintain a lasting association.

Leaving the Eastman House in 1968, Fichter became an assistant professor at UCLA, where he taught with Robert Heinecken and Todd Walker. From 1971 to 1975, Fichter held visiting artist and teaching positions at UCLA, the Cranbrook Academy of Art in Michigan, and at Florida State University. He became an assistant professor at Florida State University in 1971, and continued to teach there (also serving for a period as Department Chair), until his retirement as full professor in 2006.

Beginning in the 1960s, Fichter was at the forefront of experimental photography; combining drawing, hand photoengraving processes and photographic images in his photographic practice. Of this process, which he calls Print-Photo-Fusion, Fichter writes:

Printmaking, at the heart of the matter, is about transferring a mark from one surface to another. It offers artists and others a mass production system of distribution of images and words. This frequently allows lower costs per unit of production than say, Painting. When you put photos through untraditional processes, then you get new traditions.

Fichter has had more than forty solo exhibitions, including a major retrospective, Robert Fichter: Photography and Other Questions, in 1982. Originating at the George Eastman International Museum of Photography, Rochester, New York, this exhibition toured the country from 1982-85. He has also participated in hundreds of group exhibitions. Fichter has also published extensively, coordinated numerous photography exhibitions and given lectures across the USA.

Fichter continued to live in Tallahassee, Florida until his death, with his wife Nancy Smith Fichter. They serve as the Co-Directors of The Lillian E. Smith Center for Creative Arts, at Clayton, GA, a not-for-profit arts group whose mission is to offer a place where gifted creative artists and scholars in various disciplines may find the conditions of quiet solitude and privacy in which to pursue their work.
