= Henry Holmes Smith =

American photographer

Henry Holmes Smith (1909, Bloomington, Indiana–1986) was an American photographer and a fine art photography teacher. He was inspired by the work that had been done at the German Bauhaus and in 1937 was invited to teach photography at the New Bauhaus being founded by Moholy-Nagy in Chicago. After World War II, he spent many years teaching at Indiana University. His students included Jerry Uelsmann, Jack Welpott, Robert W. Fichter, Betty Hahn and Jaromir Stephany.

Smith was often involved in the cutting edge of photographic techniques: in 1931 he started experimenting with high-speed flash photography of action subjects, and started doing color work in 1936 when few people considered it a serious artistic medium. His later images were nearly all abstract, often made directly (without a camera, i.e. like photograms), for instance images created by refracting light through splashes of water and cliché verre images with corn syrup on a glass plate. However, although acclaimed as a photographic teacher, Holmes' own photographs and other images did not achieve any real recognition from his peers.

At the end of his career, Smith questioned the value of photographic education, noting that unlike, say, a medical degree, a degree in the fine arts didn't lead to some useful role in society.

== External resources ==
- HenryHolmesSmith.Com includes images of his work and a short biography.
- Camera-less Photographs: Light Abstraction, Three Light Abstractions, Phoenix (variation).
- Drawings of Light, role of Henry Holmes Smith in the history of photography.
