= Cliché verre =

Photograph made from a hand-drawn negative

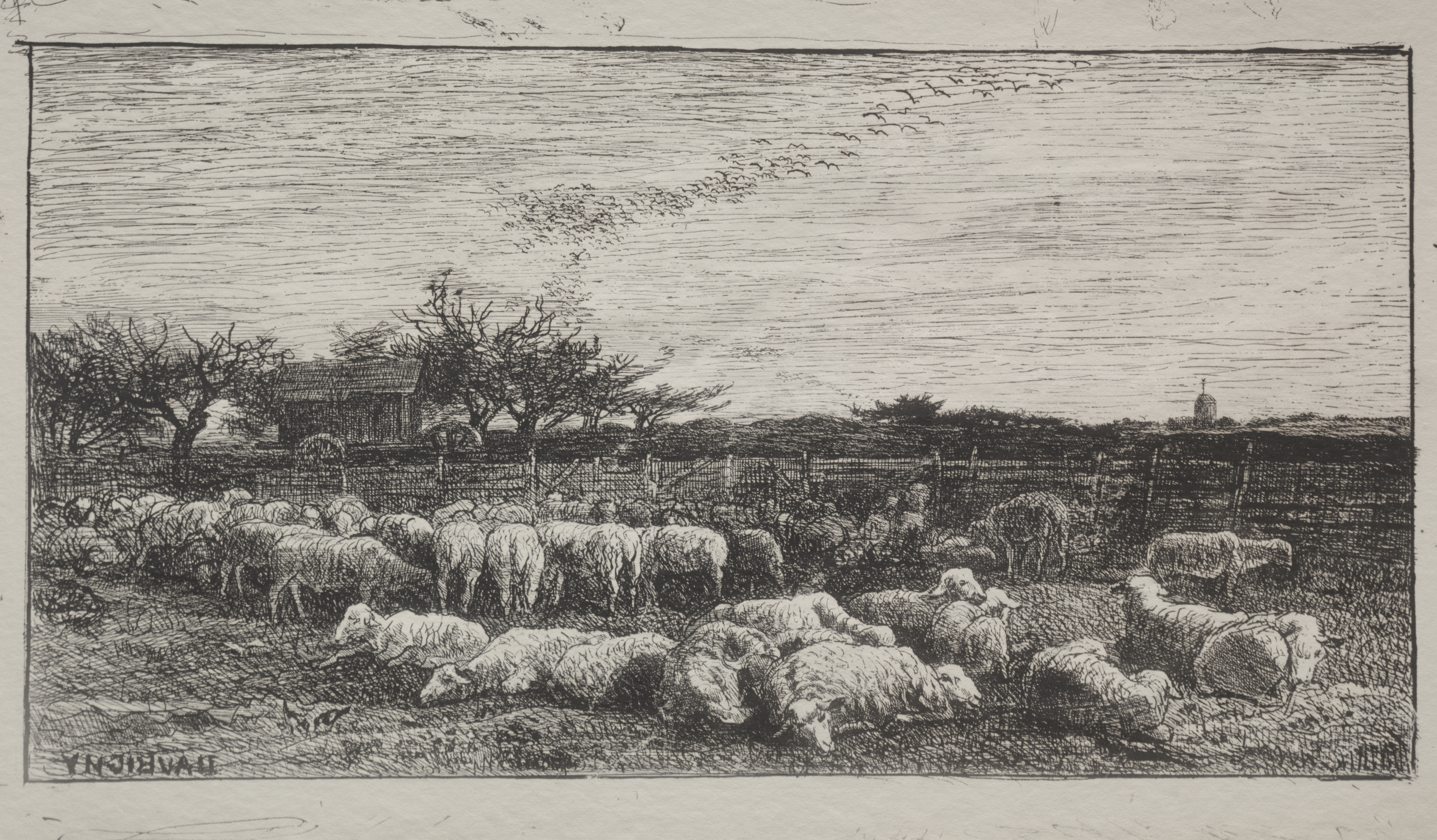
Charles-François Daubigny, The Large Sheepfold, a reprint of 1921, originally 1862. He etched and painted the same subject. The signature (bottom left) is reversed.

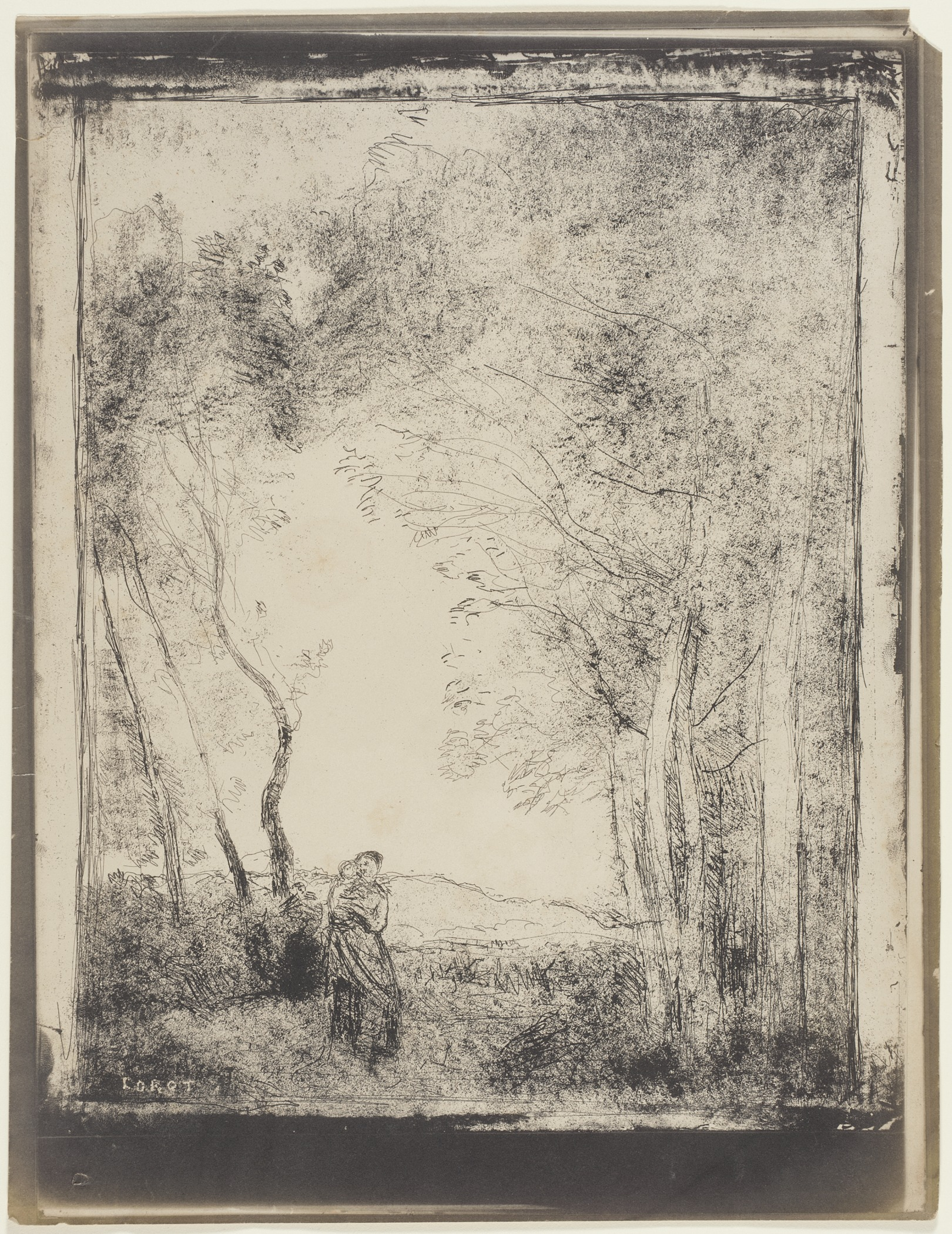
A Young Mother at the Entrance to a Wood (1856) by Jean-Baptiste-Camille Corot

Cliché verre, also known as the glass print technique, is a type of "semiphotographic" printmaking. An image is created by various means on a transparent surface, such as glass, thin paper or film, and then placed on light sensitive paper in a photographic darkroom, before exposing it to light. This acts as a photographic negative, with the parts of the image allowing light through printing on the paper. Any number of copies of the image can be made, and the technique has the unique advantage in printmaking that the design can be reversed (printed as a mirror image) just by turning the plate over. However, the image loses some sharpness when it is printed with the plain side of the glass next to the paper.

Various methods can be used to make the images such as painting or drawing, but the most common, used by Corot and most of the French Barbizon artists, is inking or painting all over a sheet of glass and then scratching the covering away to leave clear glass where the artist wants black to appear. Almost any opaque material that dries on the glass will do, and varnish, soot from candles and other coverings have been used. Cliché verre is French for "glass plate": cliché in French means a printing plate (from which the usual figurative meaning in both languages comes), while verre means glass. Numerous other names have been used for the technique in English and other languages, but none have stuck.

The making of cliché verre prints mostly divides into three phases. Firstly it was used, mainly for landscape images, in France from 1853 to about 1875, with some spread to Germany and other countries. After a hiatus, there was then some use among Modernist artists, mostly in Paris, with Paul Klee in 1902 probably the first. From the 1970s it was again taken up, mostly in America. But the hopes of some pioneers that the process would become taken up for the mass printing of images were never fulfilled, as it turned out to be "less predictable and more expensive" than the conventional printmaking processes.

== History ==
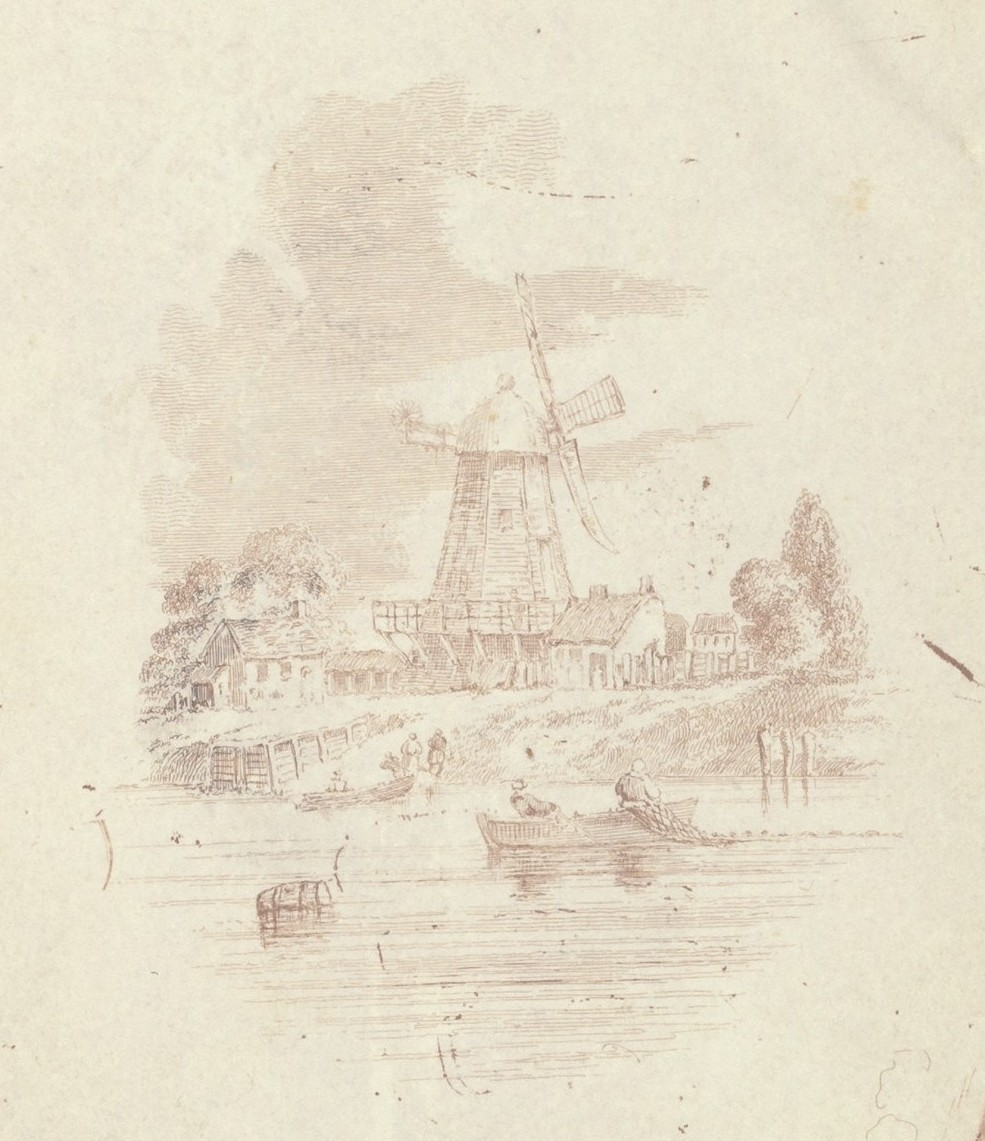
One of the earliest surviving cliché verre prints, made by Henry Fox Talbot c. 1839, but drawn by another.

The process was first invented by the English pioneer photographer Henry Fox Talbot "in the autumn of 1834, being then at Geneva" as he later wrote, when he was also developing the photogram, a contact negative process for capturing images of flat objects such as leaves. He described it to the Royal Society (of which he was a Fellow) in 1839. He made a few examples, drawn by unknown other hands but printed by himself. As he explained when sending a copy of the windmill (illustrated), his drawing was too poor; in fact it was this that had spurred him to investigate photography. Two months after this two Englishmen announced, again to the Royal Society, effectively the same process as their own invention, and there was a dispute, but in the end it was not taken to court. In 1841 it was described in the Art of Engraving by T.H. Fielding, and in another manual on photography by Robert Hunt, but not many people in England seem to have used the process, then or later.

The more productive French involvement in the 1850s began with a group in Arras consisting of the artist Constant Dutilleux, the photographer Adalbert Cuvelier, and L. Grandguillaume, a teacher of drawing. They devised a technique using printer's ink on the plate, which they coated with white lead powder, giving a white surface to "draw" on. They placed the plate on black cloth, so that as the "ground" was removed, the image showed as the same black lines on a white background that it would when printed. They introduced the French landscape painter Jean-Baptiste-Camille Corot, a friend of Dutilleux and leader of the Barbizon School of landscape painters, to the process in 1853 (when he was already in his late fifties) and he then produced about 65 images over the following twenty years.

Other artists from the Barbizon School to use the technique, mostly over the next 20 years, included Jean-François Millet, Théodore Rousseau and Charles-François Daubigny, perhaps the most prolific and successful of these in the technique. Their subjects were mostly the mixture of landscape and genre subjects found in their other work. Most were already etchers, at the start of the French etching revival. Unlike Corot and the others, it is thought that Daubigny did much of the printing himself. He was an experienced etcher, who sometimes produced prints of a subject in both techniques. Beginning with 17 plates in 1862, he used etching techniques, such as a roulette to produce dotted areas for a tonal effect, and also brushwork.

Many other artists experimented with the technique, and have left a few examples. These include Eugène Delacroix (1854, the single image illustrated below), Paul Klee (1902), Man Ray (1917), Picasso (altering normal photographic negatives taken by others), Max Ernst (1931), and Brassai (1930s). In the 1940s the American photographer Henry Holmes Smith innovated by dripping a thick corn syrup onto the plate, letting it dry and enlarging the images. This gave tonal effects around the edges of the "domes" of dried syrup. He also used coloured paper for colour effects. By this stage most artists were using the technique for abstract work, often including effects of randomness in the spirit of drip painting.

There was a slight revival in the 1970s, mostly in America. Some contemporary artists have developed techniques for achieving a variety of line, tone, texture and colour by experimenting with film, frosted Mylar, paint and inks and a wide assortment of tools for painting, etching, scratching, rubbing and daubing. Scratching a negative is another form of cliché verre. Felt-tip pen on photographic film has been used, and drawing in sand poured onto glass. Various ways of making polychrome (multi-coloured) images have been explored, and the basic technique has been combined with other materials in collages and other ways.

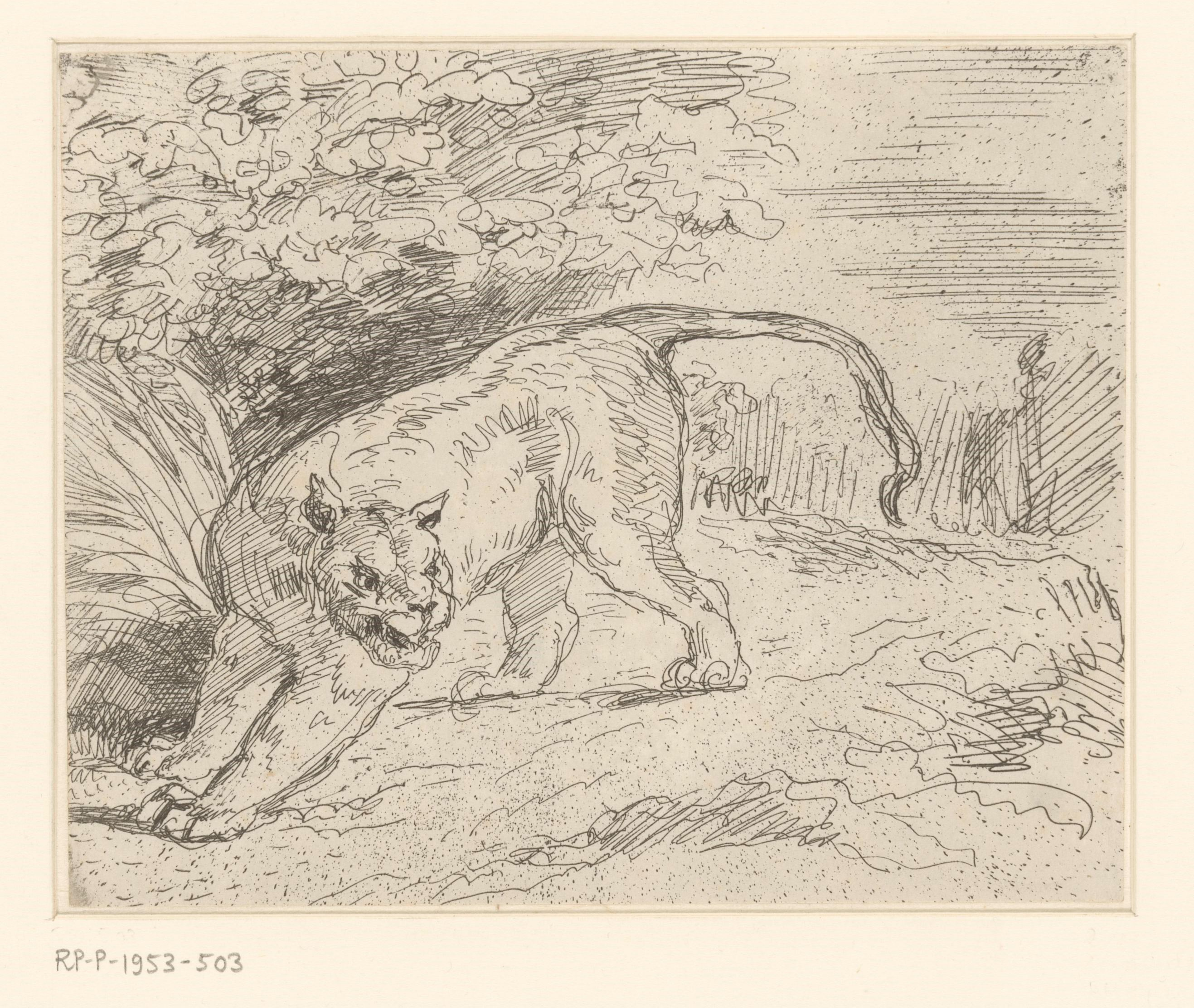
Trapped tiger, Eugène Delacroix's only cliché verre work, 1854. Usually printed the other way round.

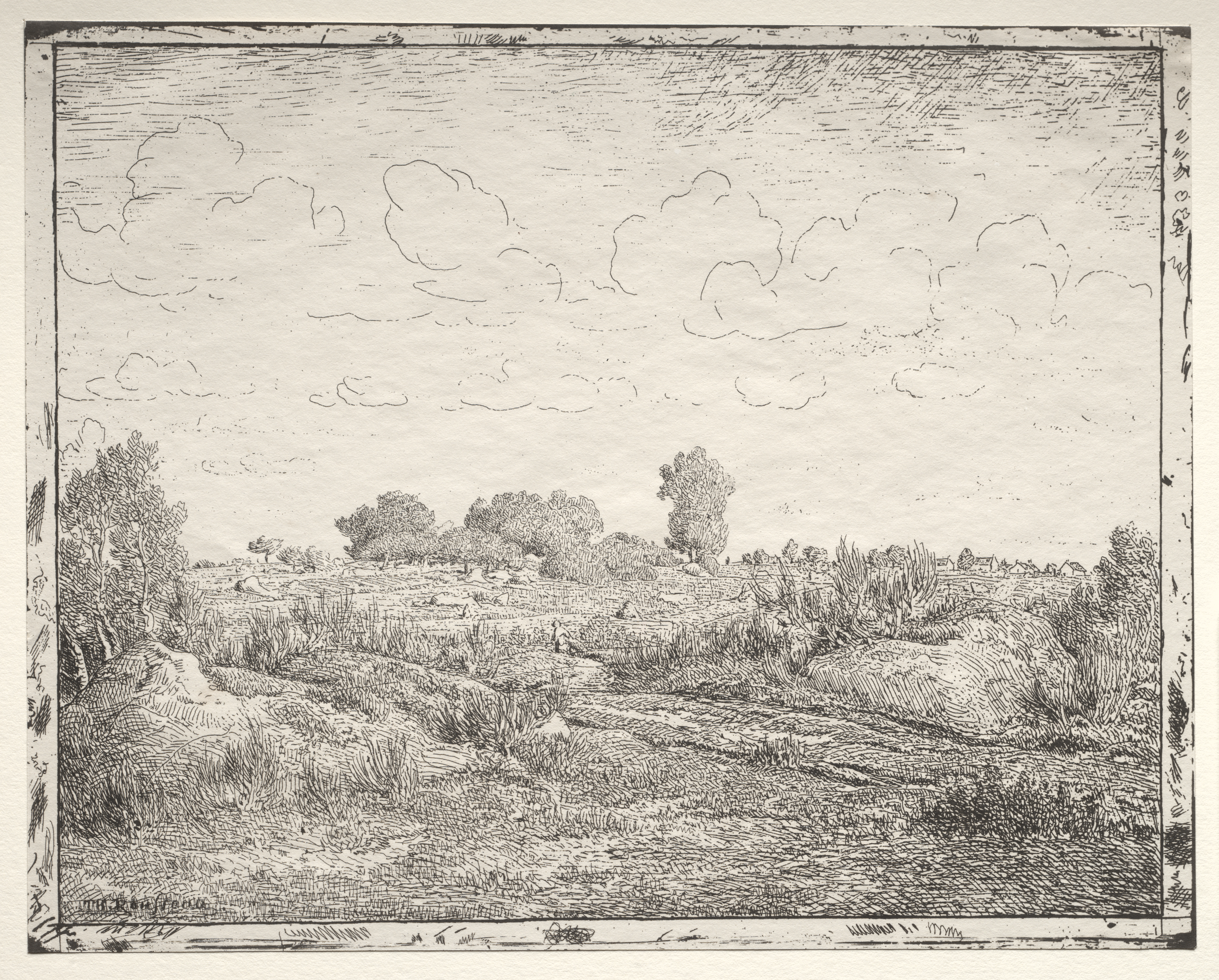
Théodore Rousseau, La Plaine de la Plante à Biau, by 1867

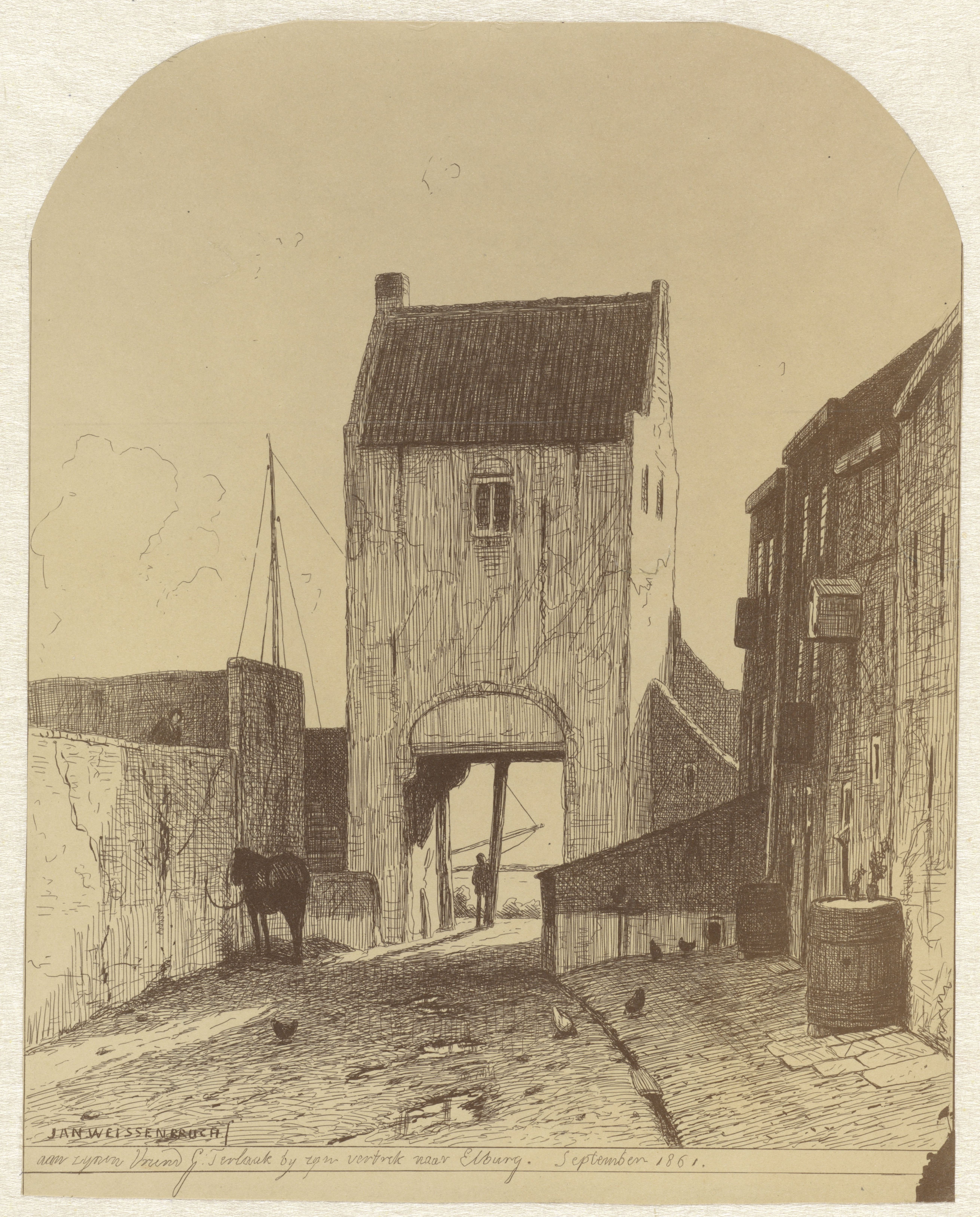
Jan Weissenbruch, The Steigerpoort at Leerdam, 1862

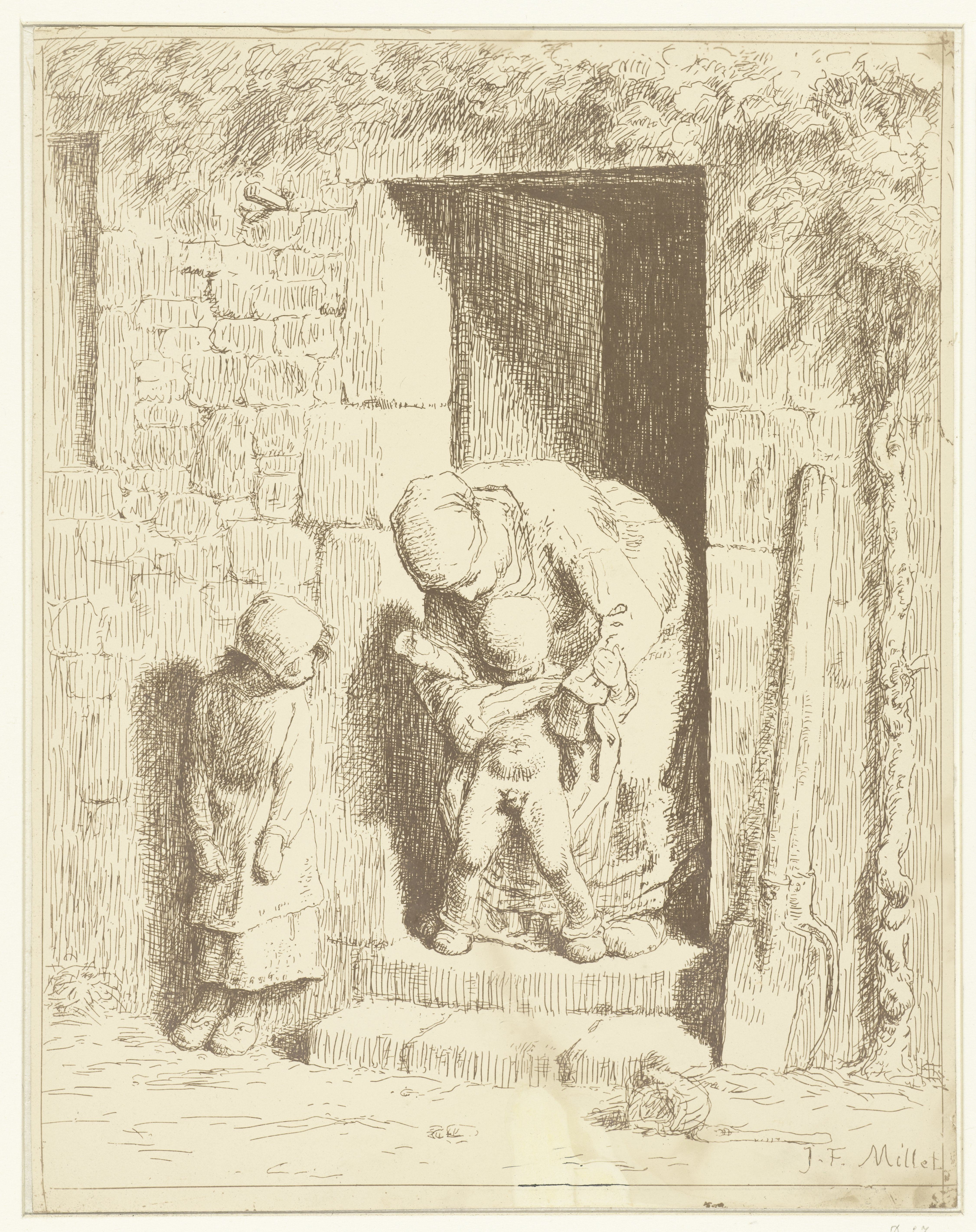
Jean-François Millet, La Précaution maternelle, 1862

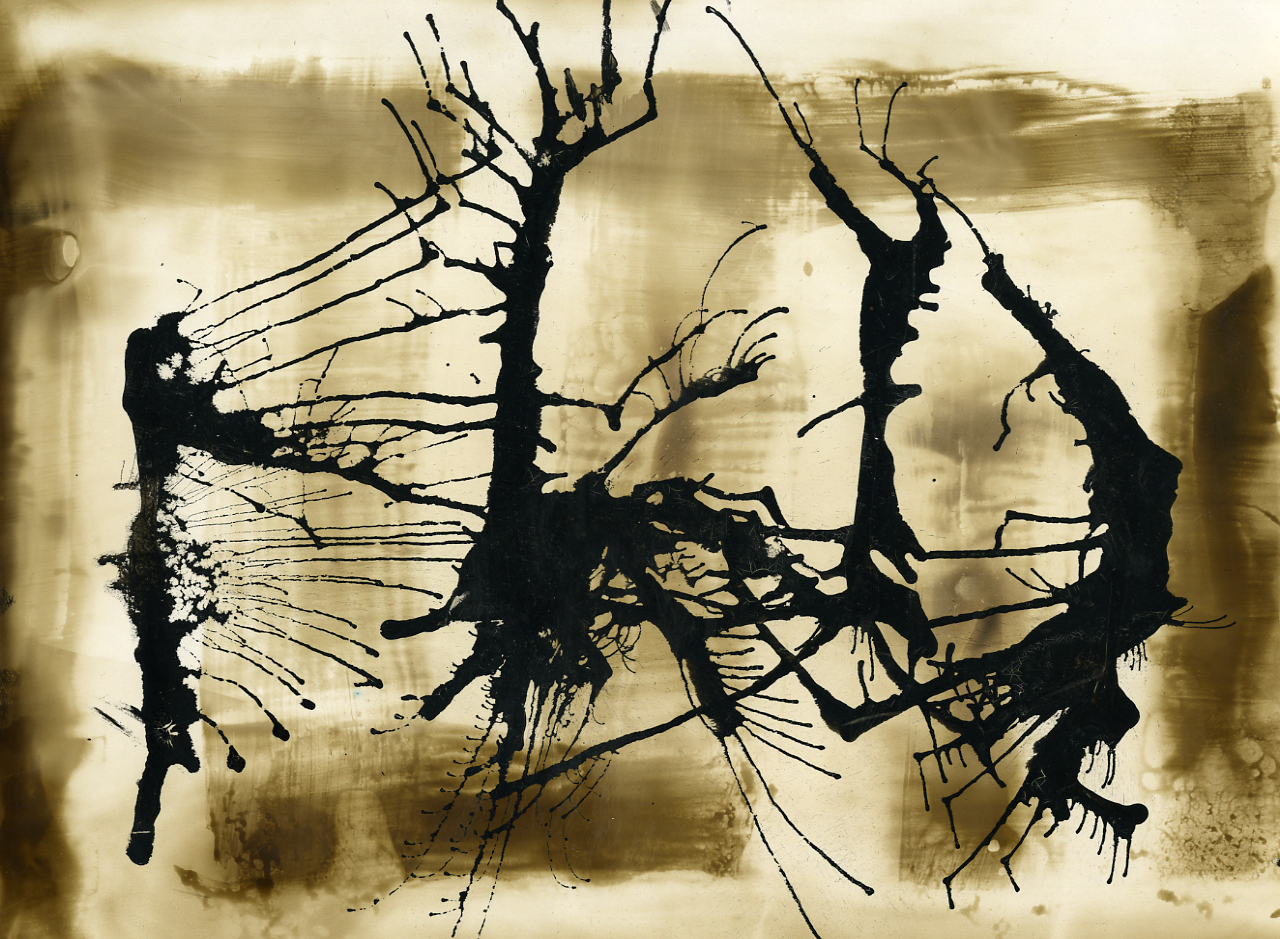
Abstract example by the Italian photographer Paolo Monti, 1970

== Glass prints ==
An obvious English translation of cliché verre is "glass print", but this is usually avoided because the term has another meaning. This is a print that has been glued face down onto glass, the paper then being carefully rubbed off to leave the ink film adhering to the glass. This is then hand-coloured and framed as a decorative piece. This was mostly practiced in the late 17th and 18th centuries, with mezzotints.
