= Maggie Taylor =

American photographer

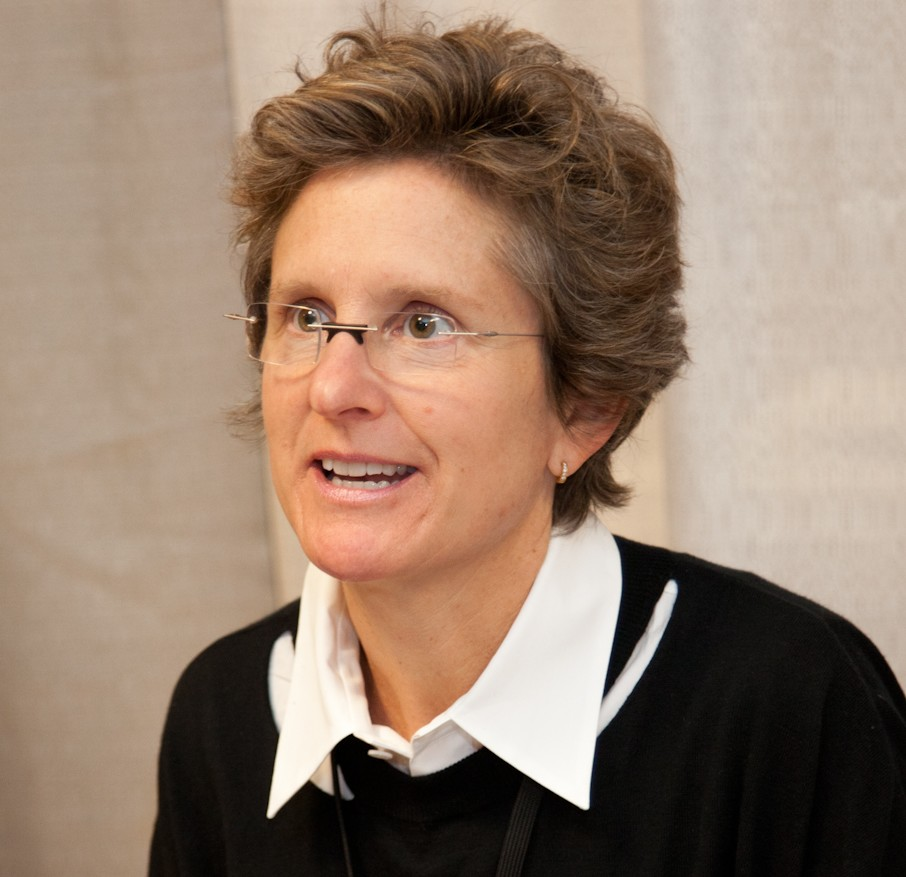
- Maggie Taylor, at the Society for Photographic Education, 2011
- Born: 1961 (age 64–65); Cleveland, Ohio
- Education: University of Florida; Yale University
- Known for: Photography, Digital imaging

Maggie Taylor (born 1961 in Cleveland, Ohio) is an artist who works with digital images. She won the Santa Fe Center for Photography's Project Competition in 2004. Her work has been widely exhibited in the United States and Europe and is represented within the permanent collections of several galleries and museums.

Her work has evolved from black and white urban landscapes to personal and colorful narrative images. The early beginnings of her process consisted of setting up found objects and photographs to create collages that she would photograph in film. This was expensive and required extra consideration as one mistake could ruin the resulting images. She produces prints by taking digital photographs and scanning objects into a computer using a flatbed scanner, then layering and manipulating these images using Adobe Photoshop into a surrealistic montage. The flexibility of Photoshop technology allowed her to bypass these issues and shift her process to creating different layers that come together in a single image. The creative director of Adobe first asked Maggie Taylor's husband at the time, Jerry Uelsmann, to try using the program Photoshop. Uelsmann didn't like the program, but Taylor was intrigued by its abilities and started to experiment with it more. At first it was just a hobby to play around with photographs, but soon she was using it to create all her artwork.

In 1996 and 2001 she received State of Florida Individual Artist's Fellowships.

== Personal life ==
Taylor grew up in Cleveland, Ohio, and later moved to Florida at the age of 11. Her first husband was the American photographer and photomontage innovator Jerry Uelsmann, and she is now married to Sten Bringert. Taylor lives in Gainesville, Florida.

== Education ==
Taylor attended Chatham Hall, Chatham, VA during high school and graduated in 1979. Taylor graduated from Yale University with a BA in philosophy Cum Laude in 1983. After taking photography classes at Yale, she decided to pursue an MFA in photography. She received her masters in 1987 from the University of Florida.

== Work ==
Taylor's artistic process is described as a scavenger hunt, starting with the search of the perfect vintage photograph as the base. Such photographs are tintypes, made with the creation of a direct positive on a thin sheet of metal, they cost her anywhere from $1 to $1000. Although her work recalls different older times, Taylor does not intend to pinpoint her work to a specific date or decade. She considers her work “digital originals” as they are created on her computer with a scanner and photos taken on her iPhone. After collecting objects, she creates her composites using Adobe Photoshop. Taylor describes her process as spontaneous and intuitive as she comes up with “images with resonance and… mysterious narrative content”. Her work is not defined by a single meaning but rather as a “visual riddle” or an “open-ended poem”. Each image is meant to tell a different story every time a different person looks at it. She says that often people think photography is autobiographical and her work is definitely a reflection of her life. Even though the dream like scenes that are whimsical and outlandish are hard to connect back to reality, she says there are parts of her life in her work but they're hard to decode. The photos used are mostly from the 17th century and she likes how they are anonymous so she can create her own backstories to each of them.

=== Inventing Photomontage ===
In 1995, Adobe's creative director Russell Brown was trying to convince Jerry Uelsmann, who is generally seen as creating the modern photomontage genre, to try out Photoshop for his work. He didn't like it. But Maggie (to whom he was married) did. She began creating her surrealist work with that tool, breaking ground help to create the modern "photoshopped" look.

== Projects ==
In 2007, she provided 45 images for the book Alice’s Adventures in Wonderland, accompanying Lewis Carroll's text. She felt drawn to the work's visually rich text and acknowledged it was the type of images she connects with in her own work.

In 2018, Maggie Taylor released Through the looking-glass, and what Alice found there accompanying Lewis Carroll's text. The book has 64 images.

== Awards and grants ==
2005 The Ultimate Eye Foundation Grant

2004 Santa Fe Center for Photography Project Competition Winner

2001 and 1996 State of Florida Individual Artist's Grant

2000 Grand Prize Winner, Photo District News/PIX Magazine Annual Digital Imaging Competition

== Exhibitions ==
SOLO SHOWS

2018 Littlejohn Contemporary, New York, Through the Looking-Glass and Other Stories

2018 Blanca Berlin Galeria, Madrid, Spain,

2018 Catherine Couturier Gallery, Houston, Through the Looking-Glass

2017 Photo-eye Gallery, Santa Fe, Maggie Taylor: A tale begun in other days

2017 Imprint Gallery, Cannon Beach, Maggie Taylor

GROUP SHOWS

2018 Photo-eye Gallery, Santa Fe, Winter Group Show

2017 Foto Relevance, Houston, Re-Float the Catherine Couturier Family Post-Hurricane Harvey Benefit

2016 VERVE Gallery of Photography, Santa Fe, AIPAD

2015 Weston Gallery, Carmel-by-the-Sea, ANIMAL ENCOUNTERS

2014 Pictura Gallery, Bloomington, Jerry Uelsmann + Maggie Taylor
