= Stephen Todd Walker =

American finance expert and author (born 1966)

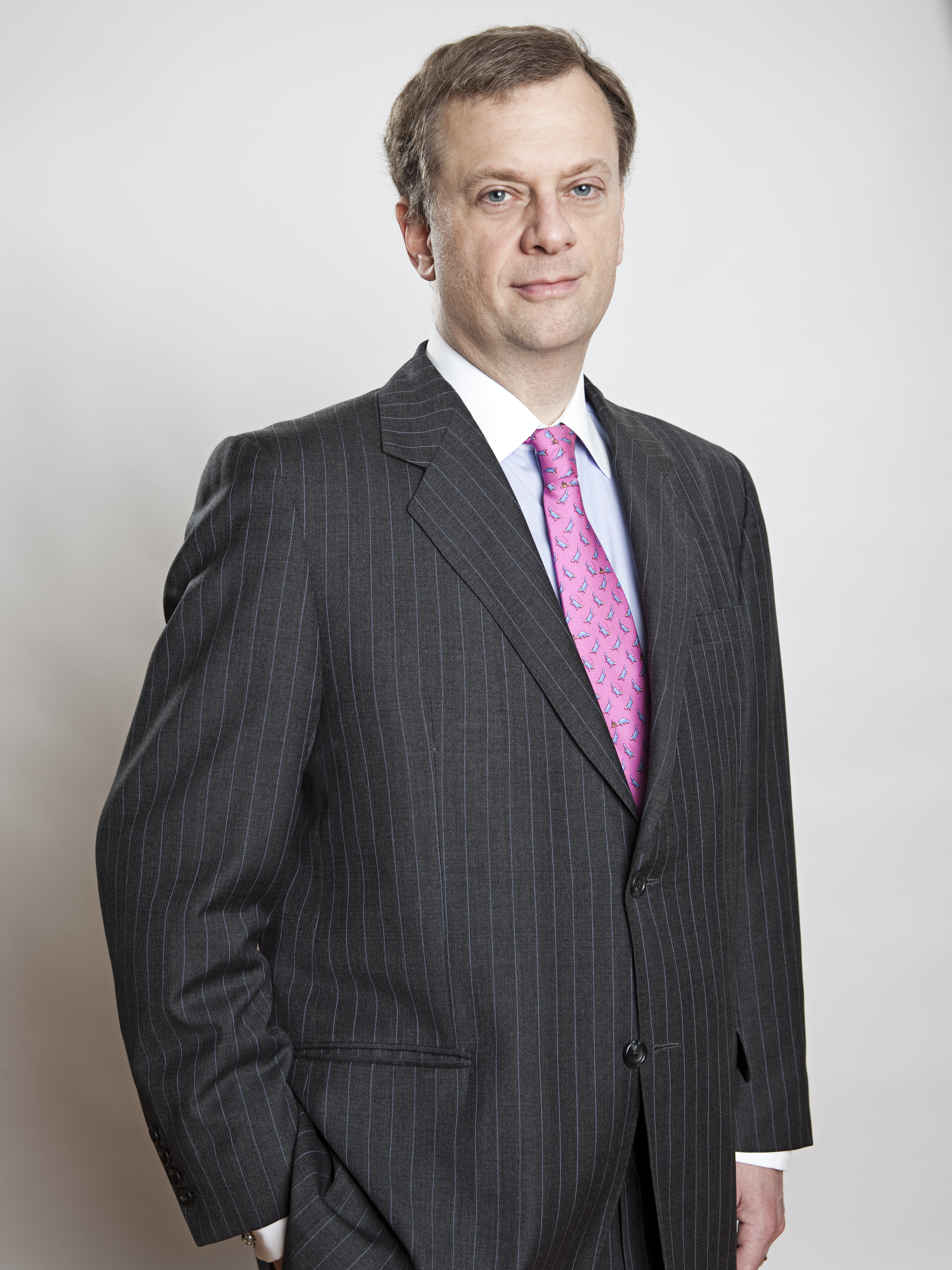
Stephen Todd Walker

Stephen Todd Walker (born May 10, 1966) is an American finance expert and author. He has an extensive background in alternative investments. He has written two books on the subject, Wave Theory For Alternative Investments: Riding The Wave with Hedge Funds, Commodities, and Venture Capital by McGraw-Hill in December 2010 and Understanding Alternative Investments: Creating Diversified Portfolios that Ride the Wave of Investment Success by Palgrave MacMillan in July 2014. Presently, he is a senior vice president at Royal Bank of Canada.

== Early life and career ==
Walker was born in Philadelphia, Pennsylvania, to Dr. and Mrs. Barry R. Walker. In 1988, Walker received his BA in English from Kenyon College. After getting his BA, Walker pursued and received an MBA in Finance in 1993 from Temple University in Philadelphia. Additionally, he attended Philadelphia Municipal Bond School and a three-year University of Pennsylvania course at the Securities Industry Institute, sponsored by the Securities Industry Association. Walker has worked in the finance sector for over 25 years. He started off his financial career at Alex. Brown & Sons in July 1993 after receiving an MBA from Temple University. Between the years of 1993 and 2001, Alex. Brown & Sons transitioned into BT Alex. Brown and then became part of Deutsche Bank. Walker was formally known to be a part of the North American Investment banking and brokerage business called Deutsche Banc Alex Brown. In March 2001, Walker left Deutsche Bank to join Morgan Stanley where he became the Senior Vice President, Corporate Group Client Director for Global Wealth Management. In May 2010, Walker left his position at Morgan Stanley to pursue a position where he currently resides, at Oppenheimer & Co. as a managing director.

== Publications ==
- Understanding Alternative Investments Creating Diversified Portfolios that Ride the Wave of Investment Success by Palgrave MacMillan
- Wave Theory for Alternative Investments: Riding the Wave with Hedge Funds, Commodities, and Venture Capital by McGraw-Hill
- Journal of Financial Planning, Riding the Right Wave with Managed Futures
- Real Estate: A Time to Buy

== Media appearances and conferences ==
Walker released his book entitled Wave Theory for Alternative Investments: Riding the Wave with Hedge Funds, Commodities, and Venture Capital in December 2010. The book was published by McGraw-Hill. This book is currently present in over 170 college and university libraries around the world including Wharton and MIT. Walker has appeared on:

- The Wealth Channel (April 5, 2012)
- KVTA Santa Barbara Radio Show (September 9, 2011)
- Fundweb.co (May 30, 2011)
- Canada's Venture Capital and Private Equity Association Keynote Speaker
- iGlobal Alternative Investment Conference (May 4, 2011)
- Pensions and Investments Annual East Coast Defined Contribution Conference (March 13, 2011)
- CNBC Closing bell (December 27, 2010)
- Fox Business (December 17, 2010)

He has also been featured in numerous publications including The Philadelphia Inquirer, The Wall Street Journal, Registered Rep, Reuters, Pageperry, and Investment Advisor.

== Awards and achievements ==
In his financial career Walker received numerous awards and recognitions. While at Alex. Brown, he was a member of Alex. Brown's "elite Flagship group". When Walker transitioned to Morgan Stanley, he rose through the ranks and became a member of the "prestigious chairman’s group" for outstanding achievement. Aside from his work related achievements, Walker was frequently featured in publications that honored him for outstanding achievement. He was listed as one of the "Forty Under 40" according to the Philadelphia Business Journal in a publication honoring the "top young entrepreneurs in the Philadelphia area". He was also listed in the Philadelphia Business Journal as one of the "Winner’s Circle: The Top Wealth Advisors”. On February 9, 2009, he was listed by Barron's as “one of the Top 1000 Advisors”. Additionally, he was named “one of the Top 25 Wealth Advisers" by the Philadelphia Business Journal 2009 Book of lists.

== Philanthropy ==
Walker is an active philanthropist. He served as a Director of the Board of Big Brothers/Big Sisters of Montgomery County and is involved with many other charitable organizations including the Boy Scouts of America, Red Cross, American Heart Association, Philadelphia Art Museum, Please Touch Museum for Children, Philadelphia Zoo, Philadelphia Orchestra, and the Franklin Institute. He serves on the board of directors for The Space Shuttle Children's Fund.
