= Yūji Saiga =

Japanese photographer (born 1951)

Yūji Saiga (雑賀 雄二, Saiga Yūji; born 1951) is a Japanese photographer.
