= Jerry Uelsmann =

American photographer (1934–2022)

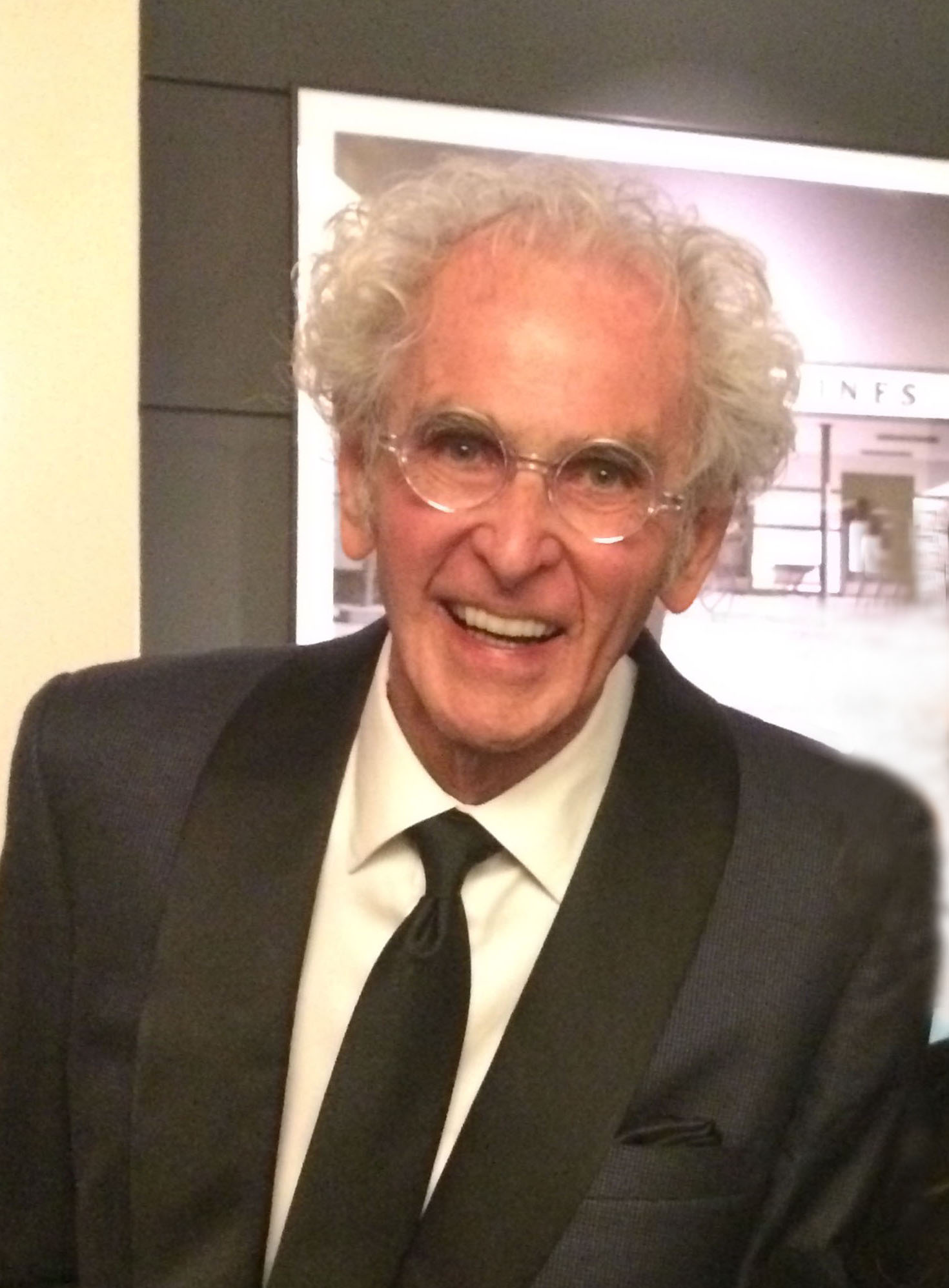
- Jerry Uelsmann at Lucie Awards in 2015
- Born: June 11, 1934; Detroit, Michigan, U.S.
- Died: April 4, 2022 (aged 87); Gainesville, Florida, U.S.
- Education: Indiana University; Rochester Institute of Technology
- Known for: Photography

Jerry Norman Uelsmann (June 11, 1934 – April 4, 2022) was an American photographer.

As an emerging artist in the 1960s, Jerry Uelsmann received international recognition for surreal, enigmatic photographs (photomontages) made with his unique method of composite printing and his dedication to revealing the deepest emotions of the human condition. Over the next six decades, his contributions to contemporary photography were firmly established with important exhibitions, prestigious awards and numerous publications. Among his awards were a Guggenheim Fellowship, National Endowment, Royal Photographic Society Fellowship, and Lucie Award.

Uelsmann described his creative process as a journey of discovery in the darkroom (visual research laboratory). Going against the established practice of previsualization (Ansel Adams, Edward Weston and others), he coined a new term, post-visualization. He decided the contents of the final print after rather than before pressing the shutter button. Uelsmann constructed his dreams like a visual poet with results that often seemed emotionally more real than the factual world. By the 1980s he became one of the most collected photographers in America. His work influenced generations of both analog and digital photographers. Although he admired digital photography, he remained completely dedicated to the alchemy of film photography in the black and white darkroom.

== Early life and education ==
Uelsmann, a native of Detroit, Michigan, credited his parents Norman (a grocer,1904-1962) and Florence (Crossman) Uelsmann (a homemaker, 1903–1986) for encouraging his creativity. His mother saved his artworks beginning in kindergarten and continuing into college. Uelsmann's father, whose hobby was photography, built a basement darkroom (c. 1948) to share with his two sons, Jerry and Robert.

In high school he worked as a photographer for the school newspaper and later attended Rochester Institute of Technology earning a BFA degree in 1957.

At RIT he was influenced by Minor White and Ralph Hattersley who taught craftsmanship (technical precision) along with the emotional and perceptual aspects of fine arts photography. Uelsmann appreciated White's mystical philosophy and devotion to Zen-like meditation even when not photographing. He was particularly affected by Minor White's belief that fine arts photographers should “strive to capture subjects for what they are and for what else they are”.

Ralph Hattersley had theories like those of Minor White especially concerning self-discovery about which he published a text. A portrait of Hattersley by Uelsmann was used for the cover of Hattersley's book, Discover Your Self Through Photography. Uelsmann recalled the demanding yet meaningful assignments given by Hattersley that caused him to see ordinary objects differently and personally. Visual and spiritual awareness were of paramount importance compared to the photographic equipment. As a student, Uelsmann used many camera formats but settled on a relatively simple medium format (Bronica) for most of his career.

After graduating from Rochester Institute of Technology, Uelsmann enrolled at Indiana University and met Professor Henry Holmes Smith (a mentee of László Moholy-Nagy). He described Smith as a “mind-bomb of inspirational ideas” and challenging questions that encouraged experimentation with concepts and images.

Uelsmann took extensive art history courses and was particularly fascinated by surrealists including René Magritte, Joseph Cornell, and Man Ray, all of whom worked from dreams, fantasies, and visions. Also, he admired the avant-garde techniques of Bauhaus photographers and the intuition of abstract expressionists. He claimed a debt to the 19th-century photomontage artists, Oscar Gustave Rejlander and Henry Peach Robinson. Vincent Van Gogh influenced Uelsmann, too. During a modern art history course at Indiana University, Uelsmann saw an image by Van Gogh and suddenly remembered seeing the same painting (a self-portrait) when he was twelve years old at the Detroit Institute of Arts. He had forgotten the artist's name but never forgot how the painting made him feel. Both Van Gogh and Uelsmann produced expressive self-portraits, although the ones by Uelsmann were often shown as anonymous figures suggesting everyman and named Untitled.

In 1960, Uelsmann earned two degrees from Indiana University, MS (audio-visual studies) and MFA (fine arts photography).

== Early career ==
Uelsmann was recruited in 1960 by Van Deren Coke to teach at the University of Florida, one of the few universities offering photography as a concentration for fine arts majors. He taught at UF until his retirement in 1998.

The first twenty years of his career (1960-1980) involved widespread success with numerous honors in education, writings, and exhibitions.

In 1962, he was one of the founders of the Society for Photographic Education (SPE) which held annual meetings where educators, students and historians could share their ideas and images about photography's relationship to themselves and the world.

Uelsmann delivered his first influential paper, “The Interrelationship of Image and Technique," at the SPE initial conference (1962 in Rochester, NY). His second paper, “Post-Visualization,” was presented in 1964 at the SPE in Chicago, IL. Some details on post-visualization and his technique of composite printing can be found below in Additional Notes and in his book Process and Perception.

He had a career breakthrough in 1967 with a solo exhibition of photomontages at the Museum of Modern Art in New York. John Szarkowski was the director.

Also, in 1967 he won a Guggenheim Fellowship for “Experiments in Multiple Printing Techniques in Photography”. With the grant, he worked on various techniques of printing and experimented with subtle colors from toners such as blues and browns.

In 1968 he returned to the Museum of Modern Art to be included in “Photography as Printmaking”, directed by Peter C. Bunnell. The exhibition increased awareness of innovative contemporary photography as a worthy addition to realistic photography.

Beginning in 1968 and continuing for decades, he scheduled extensive workshops throughout the nation for demonstrations, lectures, and hands-on practice to small groups of students. The first year of workshops included Rhode Island School of Design, Massachusetts Institute of Technology, University of Iowa, The Art Institute of Chicago, San Francisco Museum of Art, Purdue University, Ohio University, Addison Gallery of American Art, George Eastman House, The Friends of Photography (Carmel, CA), University of St. Thomas, and Wheaton College.

In 1972, he won a grant from the National Endowment for the Arts.

In 1978 Uelsmann was included in "Mirrors and Windows: American Photography since 1960" directed by John Szarkowski at the Museum of Modern Art, NY. The show reflected on two theories of contemporary photographers. One theory was about self-expression (mirror of oneself) and the second one involved observations outside of oneself with an emphasis on objectivity. There were a few artists who crossed over between these two theories. The exhibition and book were influential and stimulated much discussion pro and con.

In 1981, Jerry Uelsmann was named one of the top ten most collected photographers by American Photographer magazine.

=== Bertram Cox Memorial Lecture, 1971 ===
Uelsmann was inducted (1970) as a fellow by the Royal Photographic Society of Great Britain (London) and invited to deliver the fourth Bertram Cox Memorial Lecture in early 1971. His paper was entitled, “Some Humanistic Considerations of Photography”, most of which is archived online. Using specific examples, he explained his process of post-visualization (trying different combinations of negatives). Prior to his sessions in the darkroom, he would study hundreds of negatives using contact sheets (proof sheets). The final print could take hours or days to resolve, but the journey was always magical according to Uelsmann. Trial and error were essential steps.

He expressed gratitude for what photography revealed about himself and his fellow human beings. A persistent theme was about the never ending mysteries of life.

Beginning in the mid-1960s Uelsmann preferred the title, Untitled, for most of his photographs to invite various interpretations.

He described his persona as “an unapologetic romantic” who loves working in the darkroom.

Other parts of his lecture contained humor for which Uelsmann was noted. He joked about negative sandwiches and the random decision of using a leaf of lettuce saying he finally had a negative sandwich that was edible.

Another joke was about falling in a mud hole while on a shooting trip. When he got home, he finished the roll of film by taking photos of his muddy body (self-timer and tripod) while in the bathtub. Although he did not like the print, he sent it to John Szarkowski at the Museum of Modern Art (NY) with a letter written on the back. The surprise was that Szarkowski used the photo for a press release (calendar about exhibitions). Uelsmann, a gifted speaker, gave a memorable lecture combining humor with seriousness.

== Mid- to late-career ==
During his last four decades (1980 to 2022), Uelsmann regularly exhibited while publishing over twenty-five books about his work.

A few of those achievements are summarized below.

- In 1989 he had a fifty-print exhibition of recent work entitled “Jerry N. Uelsmann: Magic and Poetry in Photography” in Chicago, IL. One reviewer, Larry Thall, commented on Uelsmann's long-standing popularity and importance. The new work evoked his consistent themes and intriguing metaphors about birth, death and the journey in between. Larry Thall observed a heightened concern by Uelsmann regarding the environment. He mentioned photographs showing pristine nature with both congruent and incongruent aspects. For example, he referenced a photograph of the wilderness in Yosemite that, at first, looks normal. The central yet contradictory subject, an office desk on fire, is perfectly blended into the scene.
- After retiring from the University of Florida in 1998, Uelsmann set new goals and kept a busy schedule. Although he had shown internationally since the 1970s, he increased his presence abroad in the 21st century.
- In 2001–2002, Uelsmann participated in an extended interview with photographer, Robert J. Hirsch. The interview contains statements about the value of Uelsmann's personal expressive theory during a time of national disaster post September 11, 2001. The interview was published in Photo Vision Magazine which is not indexed. A website showing the interview was still available July 8, 2022.
- During 2006-2007, he and Maggie Taylor, a noted digital photographer, produced several two-person exhibitions in the United States, Korea, China, and Italy.
- In 2011-2012 he was featured in a retrospective exhibition, “The Mind’s Eye, 50 Years of Photography by Jerry Uelsmann”. The show premiered at the Harn Museum of Art in Gainesville, FL in 2011. It traveled to the Peabody Essex Museum of Art, Salem, MA and the James A. Michener Museum, Doylestown, PA.
- In 2015, he gave a short speech at Carnegie Hall (NY) as an honoree receiving a Lucie Award for achievement in Fine Art.
- In 2018, he had a solo exhibition in Baton Rouge, LA at the Louisiana State University Museum of Art. The show's title, "Confluence", referred to the flowing nature of Uelsmann's conversations (in 2018) with the scholar, Moa Petersén, especially in reference to love and loss. This dialogue inspired new work. In a lecture for the show's opening, Uelsmann talked about the emotional highs and lows evident in his photography as metaphors for life.
- He recalled one of the highs being his friendship with Ansel Adams citing a letter Uelsmann had recently rediscovered. Adams, an early and steadfast supporter of Uelsmann, was his senior by 32 years. In the letter (dated 1969), Adams referred to Uelsmann as the “eighth wonder of the world”.
- Adams wrote that on the eighth day of the creation, Jerry Uelsmann was invented because “things needed moving around”.

The photographs of Ansel Adams (realist) and Jerry Uelsmann (surrealist) had at least two common traits. The image quality and focus were superb with meticulously printed black and white photos (mostly landscapes). Both artists were dedicated to producing hand-made images. Although they represented different art theories, they shared a common goal of authenticity (authentic feelings). Uelsmann insisted that photographic theory is not a competition.

- He recalled a whimsical photograph taken in 1969 showing Ansel Adams and one of his Group f/64 partners, Imogen Cunningham, anointing Uelsmann as an honorary West Coast photographer. A print of the scene, photographed by Ted Orland in Point Lobos, CA, is owned by Boston's Museum of Fine Arts.
- In 2020 Uelsmann gave what may have been his last interview. It was recorded from his darkroom via Zoom video conferencing software and was hosted by Russell Brown, an associate of Adobe Corporation.

== Style and technique ==
Untitled (Boat and Moon) by Jerry Uelsmann, 1982, Honolulu Museum of Art

Uelsmann produced composite photographs with multiple negatives and extensive darkroom work. He operated up to a dozen enlargers to produce his final images drawing from a large archive of negatives. When beginning a photomontage, he had a strong intuitive sense of what he was looking for, some strategy for how to find it, and an understanding that mistakes are inevitable and are part of the creative process. His darkroom session began by studying his negatives. He covered a large drafting table with hundreds of proof sheets. He folded and overlapped various contact prints, explored the visual possibilities, then brought the options into his darkroom. The negatives he had chosen were placed into different enlargers. He moved the photo paper progressively down the line of enlargers building up an image. Uelsmann was a firm believer that the final image need not be tied to a single negative.

Uelsmann's interpretations invite the viewer to interact with the subject. There are many right answers available when one is willing to contemplate the possibilities. Untitled (Boat and Moon) demonstrates his ability to seamlessly blend multiple photographs into one image that appears to reinvent reality.

Partial chronologies on Uelsmann can be found in these two references.

== Critical response ==
Although many writers published positive, well documented remarks about Uelsmann, there were others who argued that his work was interesting but too manipulated to be photography. Many advocates of realism believed that a photograph should never be manipulated. Uelsmann was often his own humble critic. He commented in interviews that only 10 to 15 percent of his yearly output of 100-150 photographs stood the test of time according to his own judgement.

Uelsmann, in an interview, talked about a cultural shift away from the poetic expressiveness of the counterculture and beat generation of the 1950s and 1960s that became obvious. For example, in photography he had witnessed a decline in surrealistic photographers being shown in major museums in the late 1970s and 1980s. However, he remained undaunted and devoted to his philosophy of being personal and finding truth within oneself.

The digital age inadvertently created a new audience for Uelsmann. In the 1990s when Photoshop emerged with its seemingly endless image-altering possibilities, surrealism was revived. In the 21st century, a young generation of photographers became fascinated with Uelsmann's work.

Uelsmann enjoyed sharing his experiences and seeing the photographs of young artists. His lecture at the Michener Museum in PA (2012) is one example that is available online. The students were impressed with his work ethic. They admired his extroverted personality, wit and patience which defined his career and was well summarized by several writers.

According to Peter Bunnell, Uelsmann had a passion for people but also could sustain days alone in the darkroom. John Paul Caponigro suggested that Uelsmann's sense of humor and vivaciousness helped him deal with the darker side of life in his artwork. Music energized his darkroom including jazz, blues, rock and classical. Uelsmann memorized Broadway and popular tunes which he spontaneously sang even during social gatherings at his home or in lectures. He believed in angels (spirits) commenting about the science and mystery of angels in most religions. Several unique varieties of angels appear in his photographs. In contrast to Uelsmann's exuberance in everyday life, his photographs are rarely humorous. One example of humor is his photograph entitled Flamingos in Yosemite.

Some clues about the source of his ideas could be seen in Uelsmann's home.

His multi-windowed, contemporary home was surrounded by majestic live oaks with their perpetual mystery. Huge, serpentine-shaped limbs often touch the ground then turn upwards. Uelsmann's sizable darkroom was filled with trinkets such as small toys, bric-a-brac, decals, old cameras, valentines, and pop culture icons (like Mickey Mouse) presenting a visual wonderland that served for laughter and ideas. He often photographed miniature items like the white toy boat that appeared in some of his images. One of the “boat” photographs (Untitled) shows an empty white boat surrounded by dark waters and a distant light (moon). It has sometimes been linked to Minor White's statement before dying, “a boat is waiting for me”. Uelsmann stated that this interpretation was one of many possibilities. He believed that messages (feelings) evoked from any image are derived from the experiences of the viewer.

== Personal life ==
Jerry Uelsmann was married three times in this order: Marilynn Kamischke (later Marilyn Schlott), Diane Farris, and Maggie Taylor.

The marriages ended in divorce. With Diane Farris, he had one son, Andrew, and two grandchildren.

He died on April 4, 2022, at the age 87 In Gainesville, Florida.

== Museums ==
The collections of several major museums contain work by Jerry Uelsmann. Some of those museums are listed below with the number of works owned in 2022.

- George Eastman Museum, Rochester, NY. 330 photographs by Uelsmann
- Sidney and Lois Eskenazi Museum of Art, Bloomington, IN. 185 photographs by Uelsmann.
- Harn Museum of Art, Gainesville, FL. 153 photographs by Uelsmann
- Ringling Museum of Art, Sarasota, FL. 69 photographs by Uelsmann
- Princeton University Art Museum, Princeton, NJ. 24 photographs by Uelsmann
- Museum of Modern Art, New York, NY. 26 photographs by Uelsmann.
- Metropolitan Museum of Art, New York, NY. 3 photographs by Uelsmann.
- Whitney Museum of American Art, New York, NY. 5 photographs by Uelsmann,
- The Art Institute of Chicago, Chicago, IL. 33 photographs by Uelsmann.
- Getty Museum, Los Angeles, CA. 8 photographs by Uelsmann.
- San Francisco Museum of Modern Art, San Francisco, CA. 11 photographs by Uelsmann.
- Smithsonian American Art Museum, Washington, D.C. 21 photographs by Uelsmann.
- Victoria and Albert Museum, London, England. 2 photographs by Uelsmann.
- Tokyo Photographic Art Museum, Tokyo, Japan. 7 photographs by Uelsmann.
- The Museum of Photography, Seoul, Korea. 1 photograph shown in highlights of collection.
- Center for Creative Photography, University of Arizona, Tucson, AZ. 8 photographs by Uelsmann.
- Museum of Fine Arts, Boston, MA. 6 photographs by Uelsmann.
- National Galleries of Scotland, Edinburgh, UK. 1 photograph by Uelsmann.
- North Carolina Museum of Art, Raleigh, NC. 7 photographs by Uelsmann.
- The Nelson-Atkins Museum of Art, Kansas City, MO. 12 photographs by Uelsmann.
- National Gallery of Canada, Ottawa, Ontario, Canada. 24 photographs by Uelsmann.
- Dallas Museum of Art, Dallas, TX. 12 photographs by Uelsmann.
- Museum of Fine Arts, Houston, TX. 24 photographs by Uelsmann.
- Detroit Institute of Arts, Detroit, MI. 2 photographs by Uelsmann.
- Southeast Museum of Photography, Daytona Beach, FL. 5 photographs by Uelsmann.
- National Gallery of Australia, Parkes ACT, Australia. 12 photographs by Uelsmann.
- Philadelphia Art Museum, Philadelphia, PA. 218 photographs by Uelsmann.

== Publications ==
- Eight Photographs. Portfolio, introduction by William E. Parker. Doubleday, Garden City (NY) 1970. OCLC 104831 (no ISBN).
- Jerry N. Uelsmann (=Aperture Monograph, volume 15, number 4). Introduction by Peter C. Bunnell, fables by Russell Edson, Philadelphia Museum of Art, Aperture, New York 1970 (reprints in 1971 and 1973). ISBN 978-0-912334-15-8.
- Silver Meditations. Introduction by Peter C. Bunnell. Morgan & Morgan, Dobbs Ferry (NY) 1975. ISBN 978-0-87100-087-3.
- Jerry Uelsmann: Photographs from 1975-79. Edited by Steven Klindt. Columbia College, Chicago (IL) 1980. OCLC 63388176
- Twenty-five Years: A Retrospective. Edited by James Enyeart. New York Graphic Society, New York 1982. ISBN 978-0-8212-1519-7.
- Process and Perception. Photographs and Commentary. Essay by John Ames. University of Florida Press, Gainesville, 1985 (2nd printing 1988). ISBN 978-0-8130-0830-1.
- The Criticism of Photography as Art: The Photographs of Jerry Uelsmann. Text by John L. Ward. University of Florida Press, Gainesville 1988. ISBN 978-0-8130-0303-0.
- Uelsmann – Yosemite, University of Florida Press, Gainesville (FL) 1996. ISBN 978-81-301-4441-2.
- Jerry Uelsmann: Photo Synthesis. Foreword by A. D. Coleman. University of Florida Press, Gainesville (FL) 1996. ISBN 0-8130-1160-8.
- Museum Studies. Text by Peter C. Bunnell. Nazraeli Press, Tucson (AZ) 1999. ISBN 978-3-923922-72-7 (1000 copies in plexiglass box on black panel, signed).
- Approaching the Shadow. Text by Bill Jay. Nazraeli, Tucson 2000. ISBN 978-3-923922-79-6 (2000, signed).
- Referencing Art. Texts by Alexander Alberro and Nora M. Alter. Nazraeli, Tucson 2003. ISBN 978-1-59005-061-3 (2000, signed).
- Other Realities. Texts by Paul Karabanis and Peter Bunnell. Bulfinch, Boston (MA) and London (UK), 2005. ISBN 978-0-8212-5742-5.
- Meditation Navigation: Jerry Uelsmann 1961–2006. Marsilio, Venice (Italy) 2007. ISBN 978-88-317-9243-1.
- Maggie and Jerry. The Works of Jerry Uelsmann and Maggie Taylor. Texts by Maggie Taylor and Phillip Prodger. The Museum of Photography, Seoul, Korea, 2007. OCLC 297155764 (no ISBN, in English and Korean, signed by both).
- Xiang Xiang De Shi Kong: Jieli Yousiman hui gui – Imaginary Space: Jerry Uelsmann Retrospective. Zhong Hua Shi Ji Tan Shi Jie Yi Shu Guan. Zhongguo She Ying Chu Ban She (Chinese Photographic Publishing House), Beijing (China) 2007. ISBN 978-7-80236-087-7 (in Chinese and English).
- Just Suppose: Photographs by Jerry Uelsmann and Maggie Taylor, University of Florida Press, Gainesville (FL) 2007. OCLC 503296934 (no ISBN, oblong, spiralbound).
- Whispers of Blended Shadows: The Art of Jerry Uelsmann, Taipei Fine Arts Museum, Taipei (Taiwan) 2008. ISBN 978-986-01-5538-9.
- Prima Facie: The Photography of Jerry Uelsmann. Text by A. D. Coleman. See+Gallery, Beijing (China) 2008. ISBN 978-988-17876-7-5.
- The Mind's Eye: Photographs by Jerry Uelsmann. Introduction by A.D. Coleman, text by Phillip Prodger. Modern Books, San Francisco (CA) 2010. ISBN 978-0-9801044-4-8 (100 copies, signed).
- Dances with Negatives. Text by Ted Orland. Center for Photographic Art, Carmel (CA) 2011. OCLC 779852844
- Synchronistic Moments, PaciArte Contemporary, Albissola Marina Vanilla Ed., Brescia (Italy) 2011. ISBN 978-88-6057-115-1.
- Moth and Bonelight. Poetry by Steven Brown. 21st Editions, South Dennis (MA) 2011. OCLC 708253990 (handmade book).
- Uelsmann Untitled: A Retrospective. Introduction by Carol McCusker. University of Florida Press, Gainesville (FL) 2014. ISBN 978-0-8130-4949-6.
