= Two Shells =

Photograph by Edward Weston

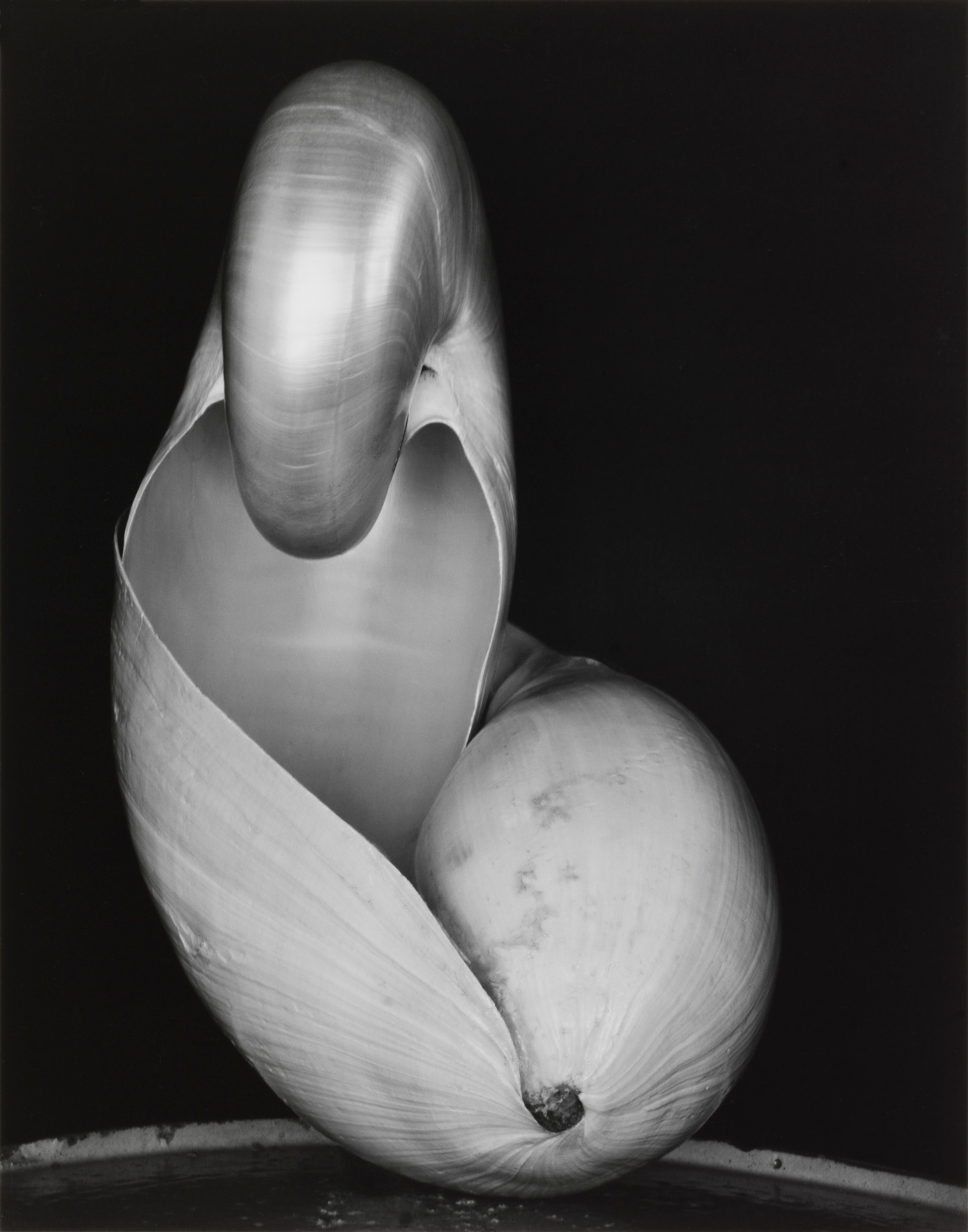
Two Shells (1927) by Edward Weston

Two Shells, also known as Shells, is a black and white photograph taken by American photographer Edward Weston, in 1927. It was part of a series containing 26 photographs of sea shells from the same year, including Weston's famous Nautilus.

== History and description ==
Weston developed an interest for nautilus shells after meeting the painter Henrietta Shore, who had been painting them for a long time, and even had some decorating her studio. Weston wrote that “I think the Chambered Nautilus has one of the most exquisite forms, to say nothing of color and texture, in nature. I was awakened to shells by the painting of Henry (...) Henry's influence, or stimulation, I see not just in shell subject matter, it is in all my late work,—in the bananas and the nudes.”

For this picture, Weston decided to put two different shells together. He worked in his studio, in Glendale, California, where he placed precariously a nautilus shell upon an bailer shell, on a surface that appears semi-reflective, with a dark background. The union of the two shells seems to originate a new unique creation, seemingly an sculptural abstract art form. The Tate website states: "Their curves appear to blend into one abstract form, although at the top of the composition the nautilus shell curves forward, giving the overall shape a seahorse-like, organic quality. The bottom of the form is also curved and the surface on which it rests is slightly convex, such that the shell shape appears precariously balanced."

Holden Luntz states that "In Shells, Weston demonstrates how photography has the capacity of capturing the essence of its subject. Once the image is taken, the work lives on its own terms; the photograph is no longer only a representation of an object; it becomes an exploration of ideas. Weston explored the forms and organic composition of shells, simultaneously creating an intimate and bold vision. (...) In its pure, unadulterated presentation, Weston captures a true wonder of nature."

Weston at the time was becoming an exponent of straight photography and the current picture, with his straightforward and sharp focus, exemplifies perfectly his belief in the full potential of photography as an art form.

== Art market ==
A print of this photograph was sold for $533,000, at Sotheby’s New York, in April 2013.

== Public collections ==
There are prints of this photograph at the Tate galleries, in London, the J. Paul Getty Museum, in Los Angeles, the Museum of Fine Arts, in Houston, the San Francisco Museum of Modern Art, the Nelson-Atkins Museum of Art, in Kansas City, and at the Library of Congress, in Washington, D.C.
