= Nude (Charis, Santa Monica) =

1936 photograph by Edward Weston

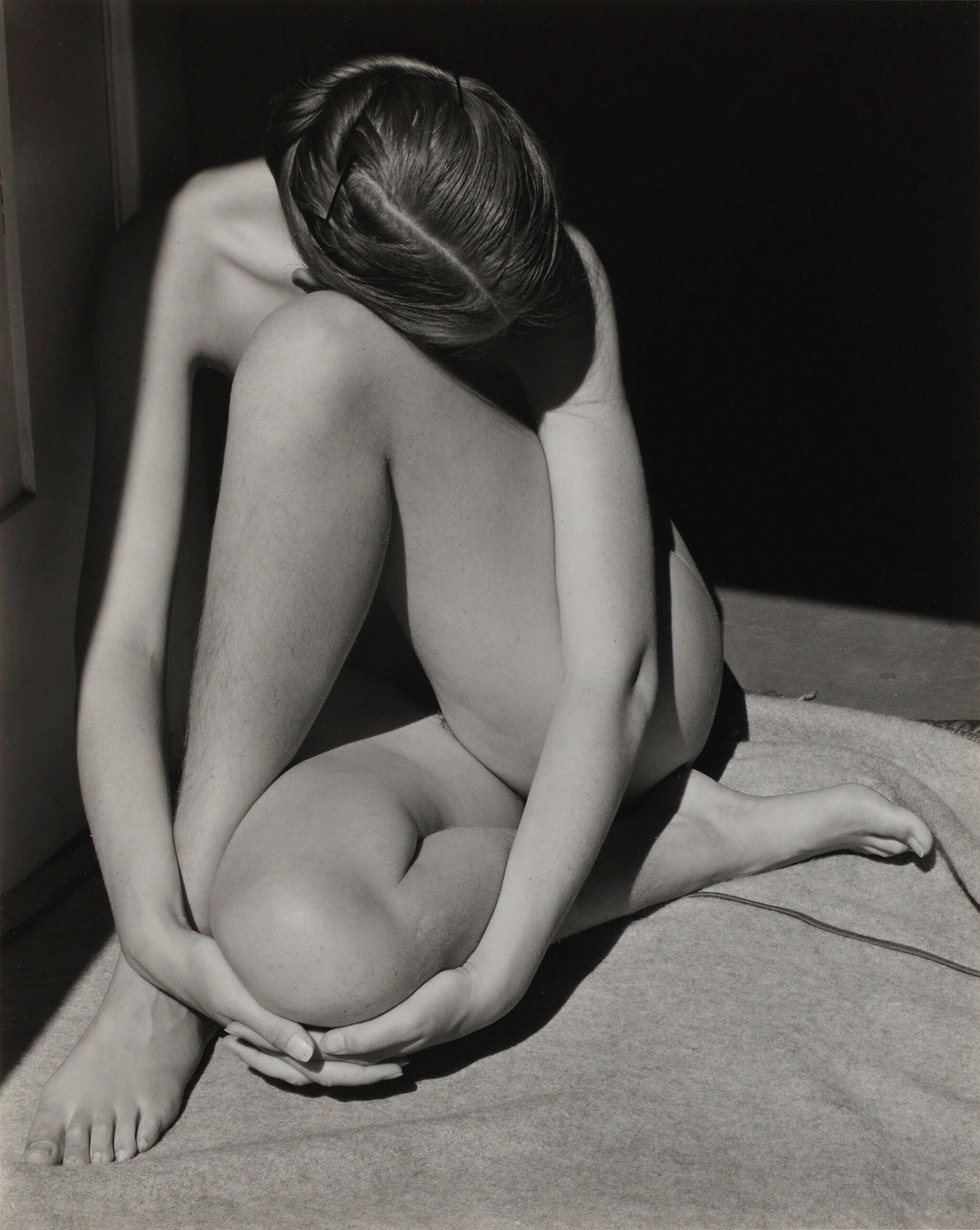
Nude (Charis, Santa Monica) (1936) by Edward Weston, print by Cole Weston

Nude (Charis, Santa Monica) is a black and white photograph taken by Edward Weston in 1936. It shows an apparently nude woman with her arms wrapped around her legs while she sits on a blanket in bright sunlight against a darkened doorway. The dynamic balance of the light and dark accentuate the curves and angles of the woman's body; at the same time her face and all but the slightest hint of her pubic area are hidden from view, requiring the viewer to concentrate on her arms, legs, feet and hands. It is an image of a nude that concentrates solely on the forms of the body rather than the sexuality. The model was his muse and assistant, Charis Wilson, whom he married a year later.

== Making the photograph ==
The Great Depression years of the early 1930s were hard on Weston, who, in spite of his relative fame, struggled to make ends meet. In early 1935 he closed his studio in Glendale and moved into a house with his three sons Brett, Cole and Neil at 446 Mesa Road in Santa Monica, California. The house was a modest two-bedroom bungalow, with not much personal space for the four of them. Even so, later that year he asked Wilson to join him, and she soon moved in. All five managed to live in the same space for several years.

Weston and Wilson claimed the master bedroom, which included a large sundeck looking westward to the ocean and the sun. It was there that he photographed Wilson, who posed on a wool blanket because the silver-painted deck surface in the sun was too hot against her bare skin. Later she recalled:

I sat in the bedroom doorway with the room in a shadow behind me. Even then the light was almost overpoweringly bright. When I ducked my head to avoid looking at it, Edward said "Just keep it that way." He was never happy with the shadow on my right arm, and I was never happy with the crooked hair part and the bobby pins. But when I see the picture unexpectedly, I remember most vividly Edward examining the print with a magnifying glass to decide if the few visible pubic hairs would prevent him from shipping it through the mails.

Unlike many of Weston's earlier images, he left no indication of his intentions or feelings about this particular photograph. For many years he had kept an extensive journal about his photography that he called his Daybooks, but he abruptly stopped writing in them two years before this image was taken. Later he wrote "I laughingly blame Ch[aris] for cramping my style as a writer ‒ and there may be some truth in this charge ‒ but the fact is that I have not had much time, nor necessary aloneness for keeping an intimate journal." Regardless of what he felt at the time, the image has since become one of his most published photographs and one of the icons of 20th century photography.

== Observations ==
Photography historian Nancy Newhall wrote that in this image Weston "used light like a chisel. The light he loves best is almost axial with the lens ‒ the same light-angle at which a news photographer's flash flattens faces and collapses space with its fake shadows. Here the luminous flesh rounds out of the shadow, and the shadow itself, from subtle recession to deep void, is as active and potent as the light."

Another observer wrote, "In the portrait Charis is posing nude…Weston manages to convey her nudity as a form of art. He is able to capture the emotional side of Charis as well as set a calming sense of emotion for viewers of this piece of art. The way the light cascades upon her forms shadows in order to help contour and frame her body, exemplifying the delicate features of her body as a whole. Weston uses both a simple background and foreground in order to draw attention to the main image (Charis).

Some writers have observed that in his photos of Wilson, Weston transformed his vision of nudes. Prior to this, most of his figure studies had been of fragments of bodies ‒ a torso, breasts, hips, legs ‒ isolated from the complete being. With this image "he went from shooting an anonymous body to shooting a woman—and the images of that woman, quietly posed or splayed in sand dunes, were iconic."

== Technical aspects ==
Weston took the photo using his 8 X 10 Ansco view camera with a Zeiss 21 cm lens. Like all of his photos, he made a single exposure of the image.

Because of the extreme contrast between the bright sun on skin and the dark shadows of the doorway, prints from this negative required both burning and dodging. In an extensive description of what Weston did to produce a final print of this image, his son Cole Weston said all of the shadows on the body, especially on her right arm (seen on the left in the image), had to be held back (lightened), while the blanket on the right side of the print had to be burned in (darkened).

== Art market ==
A print originally created in 1936 by Weston sold at auction in 2003 for $260,000, in 2009 for $109,800, and at Sotheby's, New York in 2014 for $653,000.
