= Pepper No. 30 =

Photograph by Edward Weston

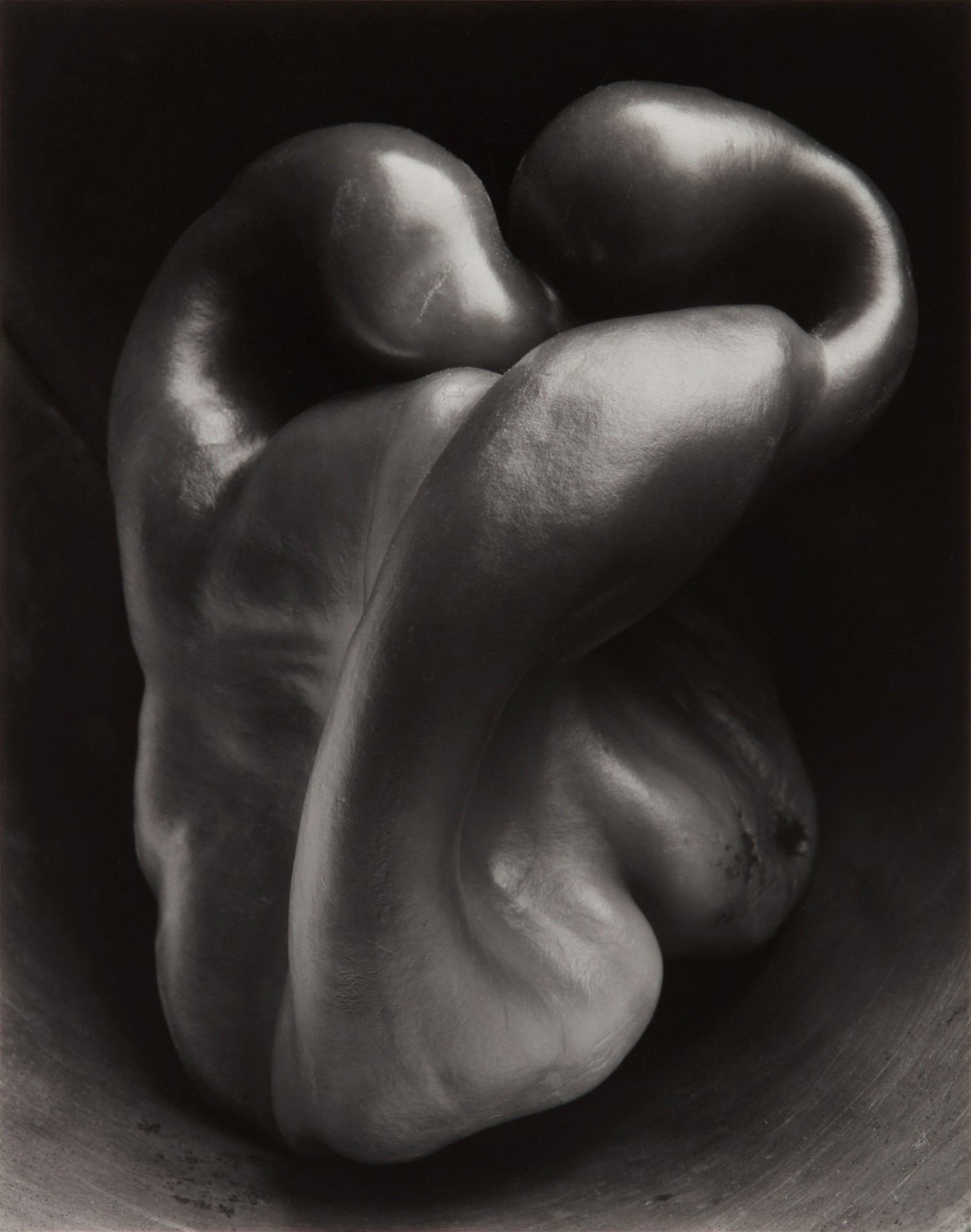
Pepper No. 30 (1930) by Edward Weston. Posthumous print by his son Cole Weston.

Pepper No. 30 is a black and white photograph and is one of the best-known photographs taken by Edward Weston. It depicts a solitary green pepper in rich black-and-white tones, with strong illumination from above.

== Background ==
In the late 1920s Weston began taking a series of close-up images of different objects that he called "still lifes". For several years he experimented with a variety of images of shells, vegetables and fruits, and in 1927 he made his first photograph of a pepper. He received mixed feedback about that image, but two years later he started a new series that focused on peppers alone. He recorded twenty-six negatives of peppers taken during 1929, mostly taken against plain burlap or muslin backdrops.

A year later, during a four-day period from August 2–6, 1930, Weston took at least thirty more negatives of peppers. He first tried again with plain muslin or a piece of white cardboard as the backdrop, but for these images he thought the contrast between the backdrop and the pepper was too stark. On August 2 he found a large tin funnel, and, placing it on its side, he set a pepper just inside the large open end. He wrote:

It was a bright idea, a perfect relief for the pepper and adding reflecting light to important contours. I still had the pepper which caused me a week's work, I had decided I could go no further with it, yet something kept me from taking it to the kitchen, the end of all good peppers. I placed it in the funnel, focused with the Zeiss, and knowing just the viewpoint, recognizing a perfect light, made an exposure of six minutes, with but a few moments' preliminary work, the real preliminary was on in hours passed. I have a great negative, ‒ by far the best!

It is a classic, completely satisfying, ‒ a pepper ‒ but more than a pepper; abstract, in that it is completely outside subject matter. It has no psychological attributes, no human emotions are aroused: this new pepper takes one beyond the world we know in the conscious mind.

To be sure, much of my work has this quality...but this one, and in fact all of the new ones, take one into an inner reality, ‒ the absolute, ‒ with a clear understanding, a mystic revealment. This is the "significant presentation" that I mean, the presentation through one's intuitive self, seeing "through one's eyes, not with them": the visionary."

== Photography ==
Weston photographed Pepper No. 30 using his Ansco 8×10 Commercial View camera with a Zeiss 21 cm lens. The largest aperture on this lens is f/36. According to Weston's grandson Kim, it was shot at an aperture of f/240 with an exposure time of four to six hours. This account contradicts what Edward wrote in his daybooks, where he describes an exposure of six minutes.

All prints of Pepper No. 30 are silver gelatin contact prints, approximately 9 1/2" × 7 1/2" (24.1 × 19.2 cm) – the exact size of the 8" × 10" film he used. Some slight variations in size exist due to paper shrinkage over time.

After his death, his son Cole Weston made multiple prints of this image according to his father's specifications; all of these prints are clearly labeled as "Printed by Cole Weston."

== Commentary ==
Photo historian Amy Conger, in her extensive catalog of Weston's prints at the Center for Creative Photography, said Weston made at least twenty-five prints of this image, making it his most popular pepper. She wrote:

There are many reasons for this, the long, smooth, barely turned surfaces; the glow of the light reflecting unpredictably on the firm skin; the gentle "S" curves ‒ all factors enhanced by the almost exaggerated contrasts between light and dark, concave and convex, abstract and tactile; the firm waxed surfaces toughing the scratched tin. Even the rotten spot on the lower right of the back of the pepper does not detract from the sensuous and sensual intensity. Instead the spot grounds the subject, heightening the tension between the subject and form as well as ideal and real.

Years later, Weston wrote about the lasting impact of his pepper images:

I have done perhaps fifty negatives of peppers: because of the endless variety in form manifestations, because of their extraordinary surface texture, because of the power, the force suggested in their amazing convolutions. A box of peppers at the corner grocery hold implications to stir me emotionally more than almost any other edible form, for they run the gamut of natural forms, in experimental surprises.

At the same time he expressed candid frustration with those who described his peppers in sexual tones:

The peppers which are libeled more than anything I have done, ‒ in them has been found vulvas, penises or combinations, sexual intercourse, Madonna with child, wrestlers, modern sculpture, African carving, ad nauseam, according to the state of mind of the spectator: and I have a lot of fun sizing up people from their findings!

Now call the above explanation my defense mechanism become active, I say that it is disgust and weariness over having my work labeled and pigeonholed by those who bring to it their own obviously abnormal, frustrated condition: the sexually unemployed belching gaseous irrelevancies from an undigested Freudian ferment.

On the back of a print of one of his peppers that he gave to a friend, Weston wrote, "As you like it ‒ but this is just a pepper ‒ nothing else ‒ to the impure all things ‒ are impure."

== Public collections ==
Most of the original prints made by Weston are now in museums, including the Metropolitan Museum of Art, in New York, the Museum of Modern Art, in New York, the Smithsonian American Art Museum, in Washington, D.C., The Art Institute of Chicago, the Minneapolis Institute of Art, the Museum of Fine Arts, in Houston, the Center for Creative Photography, in Tucson, the George Eastman House, in Rochester, and the Museo Nacional Centro de Arte Reina Sofía, in Madrid.

== See also ==
- List of photographs considered the most important
