= Nude, 1925 =

Photograph by Edward Weston

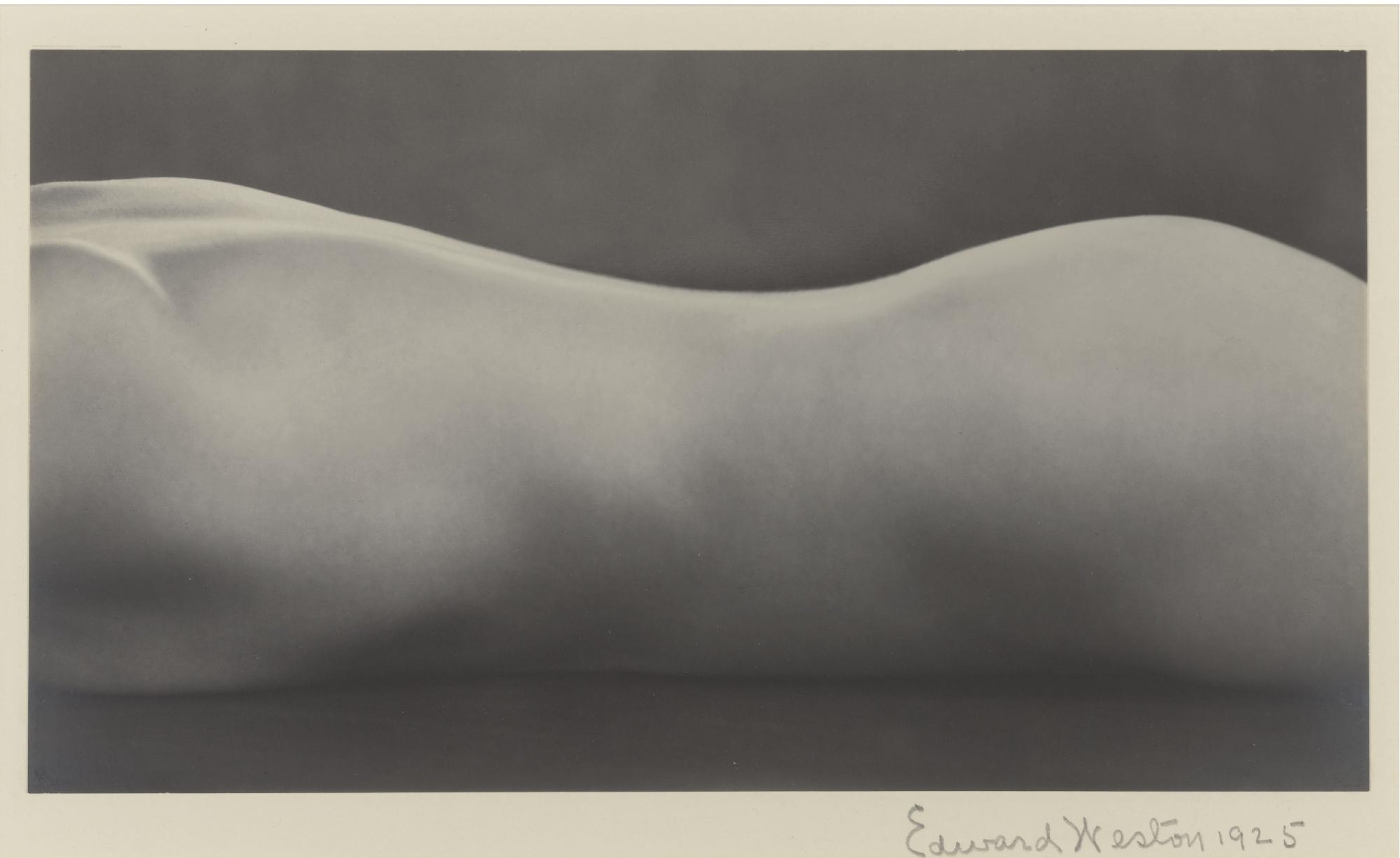
Edward Weston, Nude, 1925

Nude, 1925 is a black and white photograph taken by Edward Weston in 1925. It holds the record for Weston's most expensive photograph after being sold for $1,609,000 ($2.35 million in 2024 dollars) at the Sotheby's New York on 8 April 2008, to Peter MacGill of the Pace-MacGill Gallery. The photograph was part of the Quillan Collection of Nineteenth and Twentieth Century Photographs, which was then auctioned.

== History and description ==
Weston did several female nudes at the time, in an attempt to unite photographic realism with a new approach, contemporary art inspired. The picture depicts a nude female body lying on the ground, of which only the torso is seen, from a lateral perspective. The undulated shapes of the body create the illusion of an abstract form, akin to a natural landscape. The model was most likely Miriam Lerner, who was Weston's lover at the time.

== Public and private collections ==
Four known prints of this photograph are in existence. The first was auctioned in 2000 by Sotheby's. The one that was auctioned in 2008 has the artist's signature and date. A third print is held at the Metropolitan Museum of Art, in New York. A fourth print is held at the Dennos Museum Center at Northwestern Michigan College in Traverse City, Michigan.
