= Nautilus (photograph) =

1927 photograph by Edward Weston

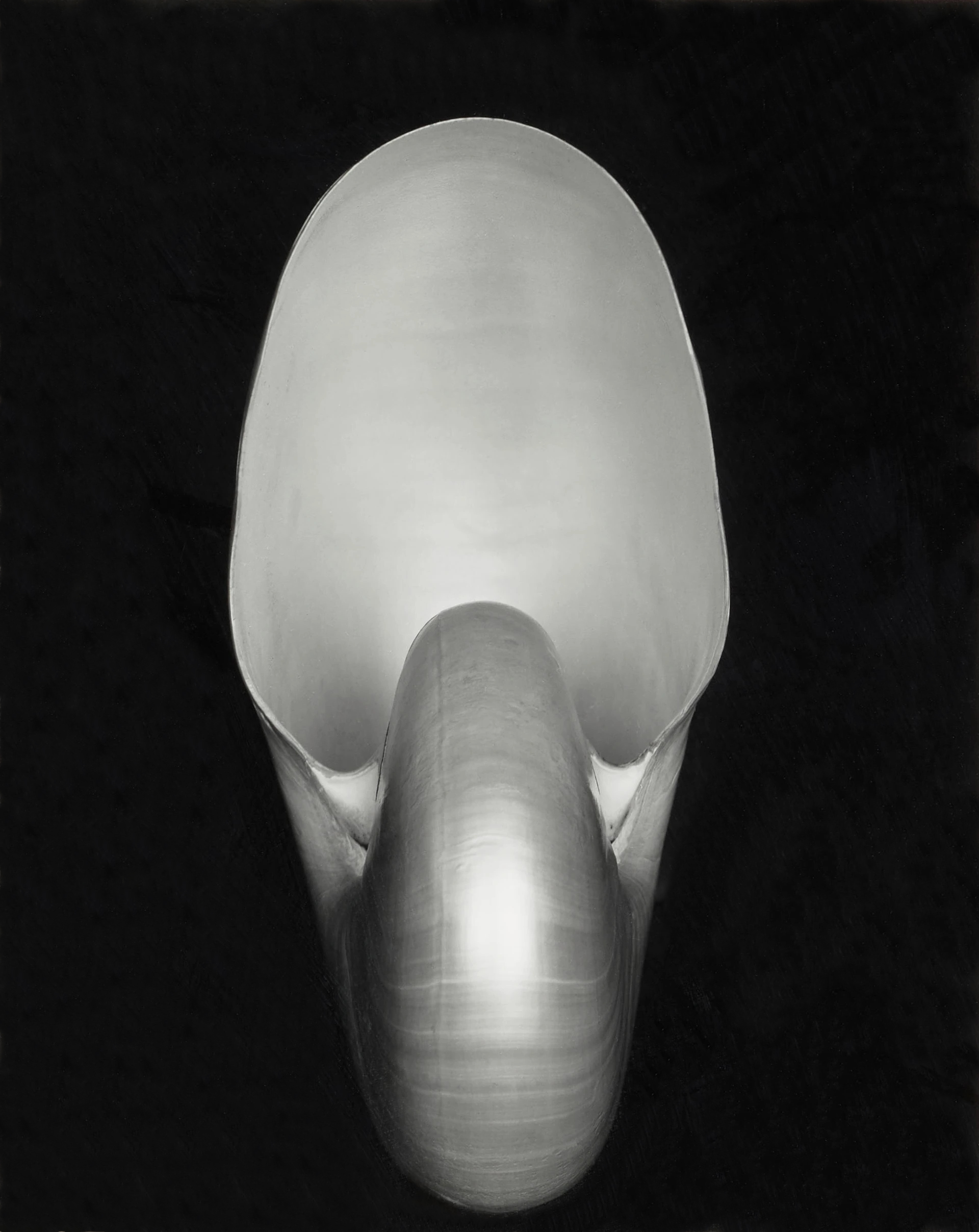
Nautilus (1927)

Nautilus is a black-and-white photograph taken by American photographer Edward Weston in 1927 of a single nautilus shell standing on its end against a dark background. It has been called "one of the most famous photographs ever made" and "a benchmark of modernism in the history of photography."

== Inspiration ==
In February 1927, Weston visited the studio of local Carmel artist Henrietta Shore and noticed several paintings she had made of sea shells. Only one of these paintings is known to still exist (as of January 2011), and it shows a stark and solitary nautilus on a dark field, not unlike Weston's resulting photographs. He made it clear in his writings that the paintings had a profound effect on him:

I was awakened to shells by the painting of Henry [Henrietta Shore]. I never saw a Chambered Nautilus before. If I had, my response would have been immediate. If I merely copy Henry's expression, my work will not live. If I am stimulated and work with real ecstasy it will live.

== Photographing ==
Within a month he began photographing several large chambered nautiluses, either whole or cut in half to reveal their inner structure. He used his Ansco 8 × 10 Commercial view camera with a Rapid Rectilinear lens stopped down to US256 (equivalent to f/64) . Notations he made about his exposures during this period indicate that the film he used would be rated about equivalent to 16 on today's ISO scale.

The technical limitations of his film and camera required him to make extremely long exposures that were easily ruined by vibrations. Weston's grandson Kim Weston said his grandfather propped up the shell on the end of an oil drum (the arc of the drum can barely be seen in the background of the image), and the thin metal oil drum head was sensitive to the slightest movement. Weston expressed his frustrations in his Daybooks:

Wednesday, June 15: "Yesterday I tried again: result, movement! The exposure was 4 1/2 hours, so to repeat was no joy, with all the preoccupation of keeping quiet children and cat, ‒ but I went ahead and await development."

The next day: "The shells again moved! It must be the heavy trucks that pass jar the building ever so slightly. Anyway, I have quit trying: I can afford no more film."

He recorded that over the next several months he made 14 negatives of shells. The famous image was made sometime between April 1 and June 8, 1927, when he recorded in his journal "Last evening I had printed, and am ready to show all shell negatives…".

== Reaction ==
Nautilus is recognized as one of Weston's greatest photographs. Weston biographer Ben Maddow has said the notability of his nautilus photographs "is not in the closeness nor in the monumentality of the forms; or at least, not in these alone. It is instead in the particular light, almost an inward luminescence, that he saw implicit in them before he put them before the lens. Glowing with an interior life . .. one is seeing more than form."

One historian wrote, "The nautilus shells proved a turning point in Weston's career and marked a critical phase in his development as one of the greatest photographers of the 20th century, a pioneering modernist whose stunning simplicity and technical mastery are often imitated but never quite equaled.""

Much has been said about Weston's intentions in photographing shells. He recorded that some of the first people to see them had intensely erotic reactions:

Tina Modotti: Edward ‒ nothing in art has affected like these photographs. I cannot look at them very long without feeling exceedingly perturbed, they disturb me not only mentally but physically. There is something so pure and at the same time so perverse about them…, They are mystical and erotic."

Diego Rivera (as described by Tina Modotti): "These photographs are biological, beside the aesthetic emotion they disturb me physically, ‒ see my forehead is sweating. Then ‒ 'Is W. very sensual?'"

Rene d'Harnoncourt (as described by Tina Modotti): "Without my saying a word he used 'erotic' also. Like me, he expressed the disturbance these prints caused in him. He felt 'weak at the knees'."

At the same time, Weston strongly denied in his writings that he had any thought, much less intention, of recording erotic symbolism:

"No! I had no physical thoughts, ‒ never have. I worked with clearer decision of sheer aesthetic form. I knew I was recording from within, my feeling for life as I never has before. Or better, when the negatives were actually developed, I realized what I felt, ‒ for when I worked, I was never more unconscious of what I was doing.

No! The Shells are too much a sublimation of all of my works and life to be pigeon-holed. Others must get from them what they bring to them: evidently they do!"

Yet, in another entry about one of his nude images he said "I saw the repeated curves of thigh and calf, ‒ the shin bone, knee and thigh lines forming shapes not unlike great sea shells…"

Weston wrote that he made 28 prints of this image on at least four different types of paper, including a matte Kodak Azo and a semi-gloss Agfa Convira. In a few early versions he extended the bottom margin of the image down to the notches on the film negative. Most prints measure approximately 9 1/2 by 7 1/2 in. (24 by 19 cm.)

== Art market ==
On April 13, 2010, a print of this image sold for $1,082,500 at Sotheby's New York. Weston originally sold it for $10.

== Public collections ==
There are prints of this image in the collections of the Metropolitan Museum of Art, in New York, the Museum of Modern Art, in New York, the Museum of Fine Arts, in Boston, the Center for Creative Photography, in Tucson, and at the George Eastman House, in Rochester.

== Other versions ==
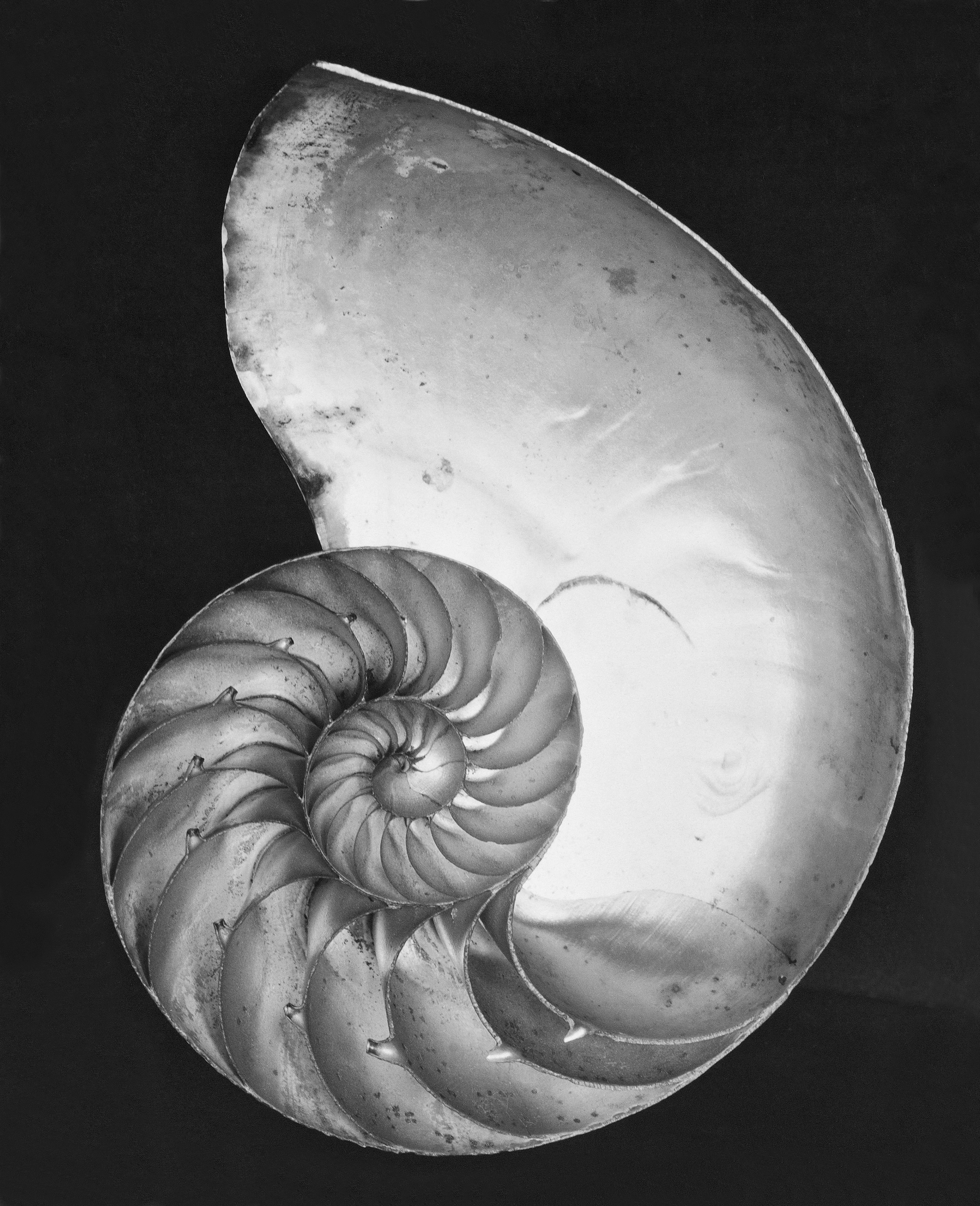

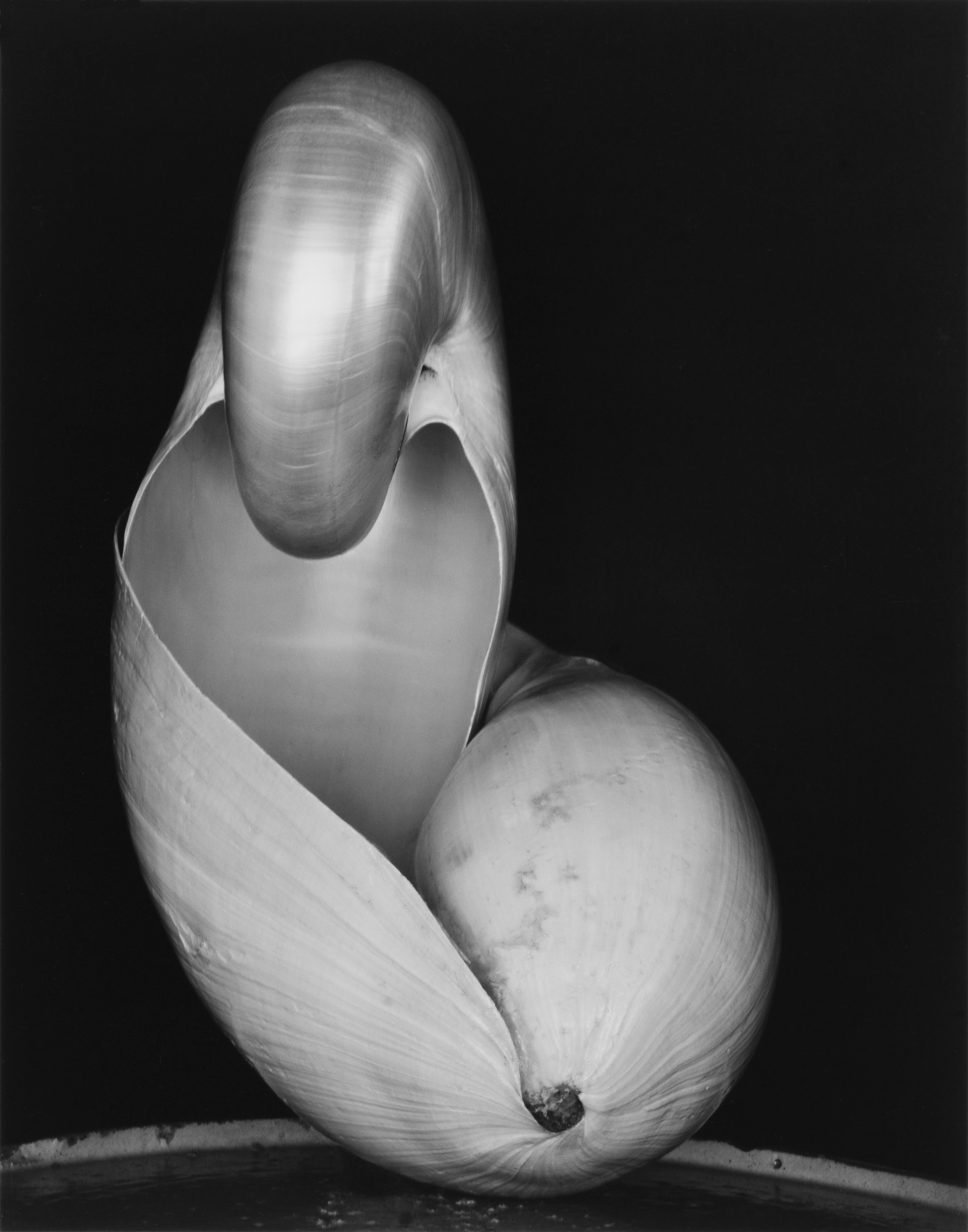

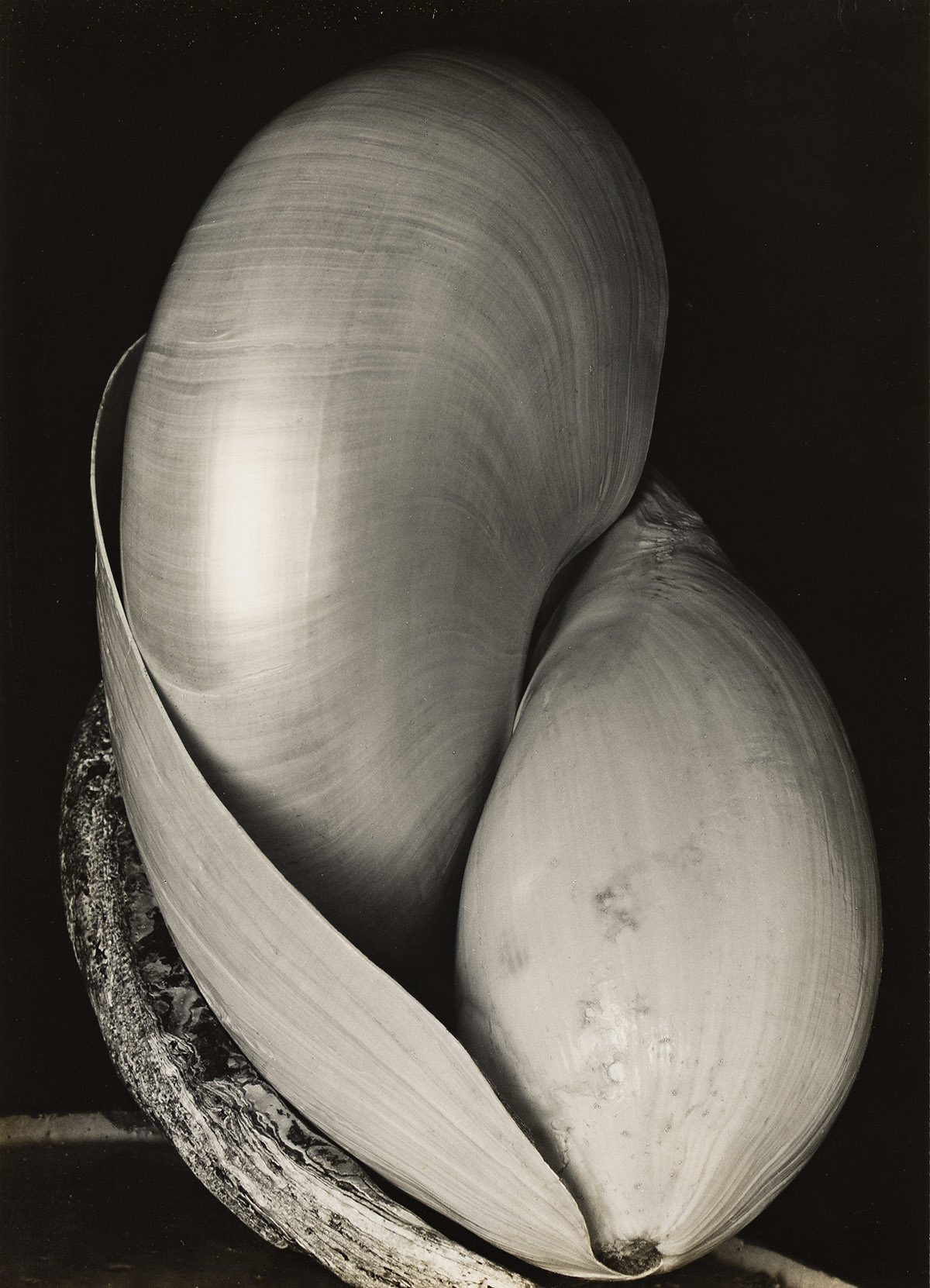

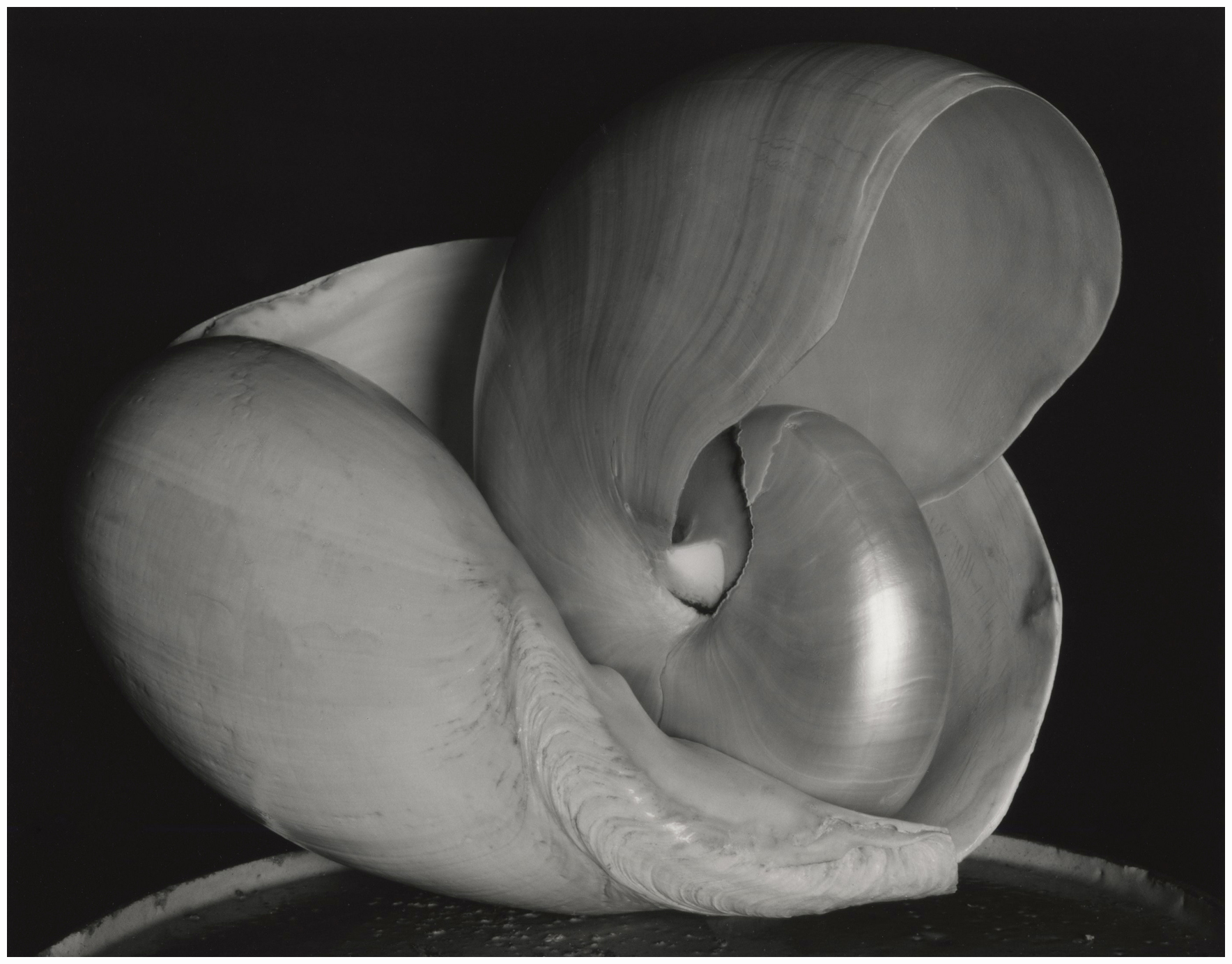
