= Cole Weston =

American photographer (1919-2003)

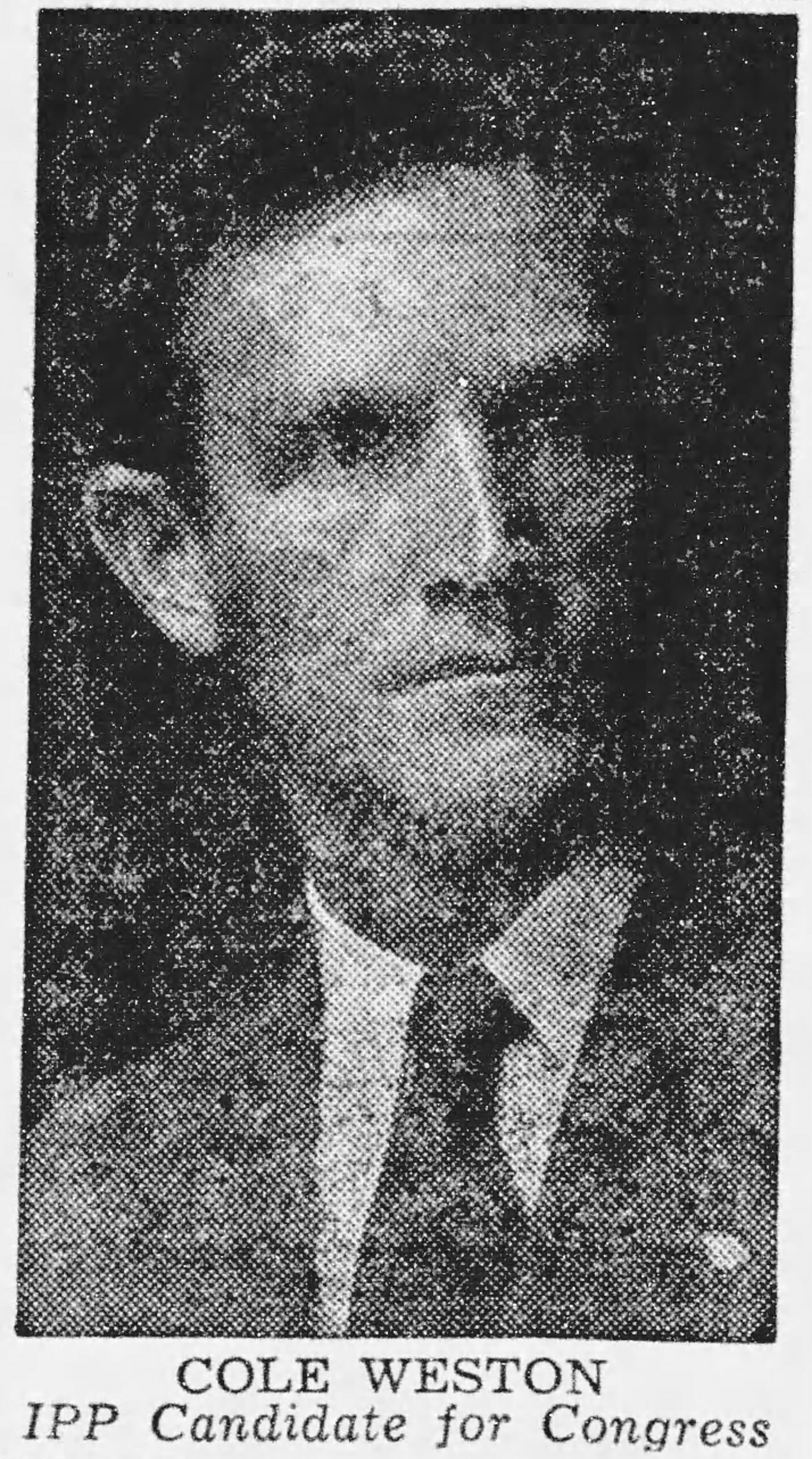
- Weston c. 1948
- Born: January 30, 1919
- Died: April 20, 2003 (aged 84); Monterey, California
- Known for: Fine art photography
- Notable work: Surf and Headlands
- Spouse(s): Dorothy Hermann, Helen Prosser, Margaret Woodward, Paulette Stubbs
- Children: Ivor Weston, Rhys Weston, Cara Weston (photographer): Kim Weston (photographer) 1953– ); Matthew Weston, Richard Weston, Erin Lamson.
- Parents: Edward Weston (1886–1958); Flora Weston
- Relatives: 4 including Brett Weston (1911–1993) (brother)

Cole Weston (January 30, 1919 – April 20, 2003) was photographer Edward Weston's fourth and youngest son. Although Weston "was born into the tradition of craftsman-produced black-and-white art photography, he was to find his own photographic direction in colour."

Cole Weston's life followed a diverse course that started with theater, later leading him to the Navy, a position photographing for Life, and later photographing portraits, before he moved to Carmel, California, in 1946, at his father's request. In the years that followed, Cole became his father's assistant and trusted companion; and, as Edward's struggle with Parkinson's disease worsened, Cole became the keeper of two careers, his father's and his own. Before his death in 2003, Cole Weston was devoted to keeping both bodies of work flourishing and circulating widely.

== Early life ==
Cole graduated with a degree in theater arts from the Cornish School in Seattle in 1937. Cole served in the United States Navy during World War II as a welder and photographer in Norman, OK. He ran for Congress in 1948 on the Progressive Party ticket, but was unsuccessful.

== Assisting Edward Weston and discovering color (1946–1958) ==
Upon his discharge from the navy, Cole started photographing for Life in Southern California. At the same time, Edward became increasingly crippled by Parkinson's disease and wrote to Cole asking for his help with the printing of his negatives; and so, in 1946, Cole and his wife moved to Carmel to help his ailing father in his darkroom and studio. Cole and his brother Brett Weston printed their father's negatives under his supervision.

At the time, Eastman Kodak sent their new color films Kodachrome and Ektachrome to Edward because they wanted him to "photograph Point Lobos in color" to which Edward responded: "Well, I don’t know anything about color, but I know Point Lobos better than any man alive". With the leftover film, Cole began experimenting with the new medium and, in 1957, he created his first color prints of the California coastline.

"I’m a color photographer. That’s what I do. Whether you like it or not, that’s what I do. There is nothing wrong with black and white, but I am into color. And I like it!"

== The second Forest Theater Guild ==
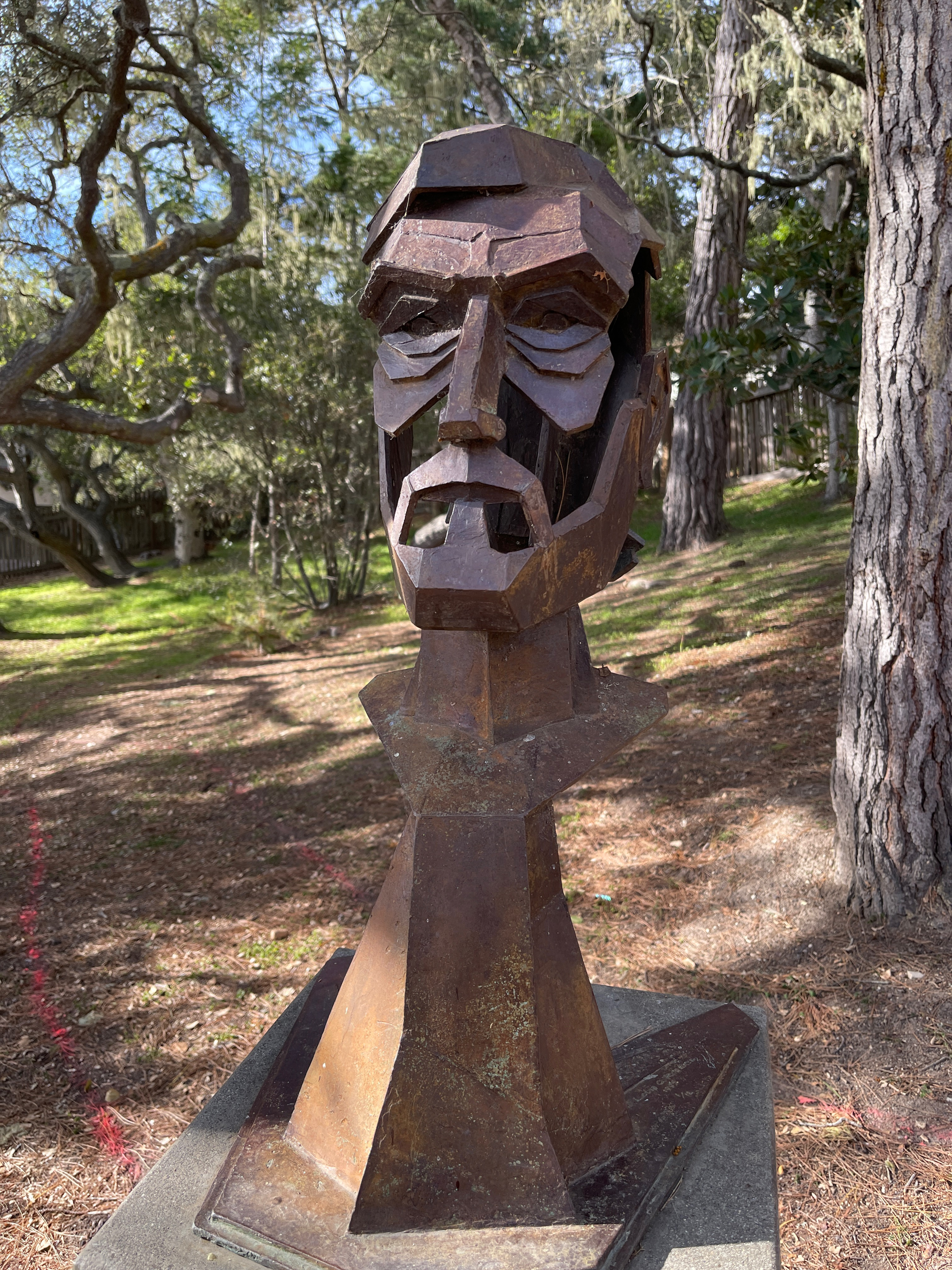
Cole Weston statue at the Forest Theater, Carmel-by-the-Sea, California

In 1971, Cole Weston established the second Forest Theater Guild in Carmel, CA and began directing productions on the outdoor stage during spring and summer months. Weston worked with the Forest Theater Guild for 50 years in which he directed more than 30 plays and was involved with the physical construction of the Indoor Forest Theater (a small theater beneath the outdoor stage) "hauling in the concrete and other building materials himself".

== Edward Weston's negatives and the Cole Weston Trust ==
In his will, Edward Weston left his negatives to Cole, who printed them for more than 30 years. On September 30, 2014, a collection of 548 prints from Edward's negatives, printed posthumously by Cole, was auctioned by Sotheby's in New York.

== Publications ==
- 1981 – Cole Weston, eighteen photographs
- 1998 – Cole Weston: At Home and Abroad
- 1991 – Cole Weston, fifty years
- 1995 – Not Man Apart: Photographs of the Big Sur Coast
- 2000 – Laughing Eyes: A Book of Letters Between Edward and Cole Weston, 1923–1946
