= Dody Weston Thompson =

American photographer (1923–2012)

- Thompson in 1947, by Edward Weston
- Born: Dora Harrison; April 11, 1923; New Orleans, Louisiana
- Died: October 14, 2012 (aged 89); Los Angeles, California
- Education: Sophie Newcomb College; Black Mountain College
- Known for: Photography
- Movement: The West Coast Photographic Movement
- Awards: Albert M. Bender Award
- Patrons: Edward Weston; Polaroid Corporation's; Artist Support Program
Dody Weston Thompson
- Other name: Dody Warren

Dody Weston Thompson (April 11, 1923 – October 14, 2012) was a 20th-century American photographer and chronicler of the history and craft of photography. She learned the art in 1947 and developed her own expression of “straight” or realistic photography, the style that emerged in Northern California in the 1930s. Dody worked closely with contemporary icons Edward Weston (her former father-in-law), Brett Weston (her former husband) and Ansel Adams (as an assistant and a friend) during the late 1940s and through the 1950s, with additional collaboration with Brett Weston in the 1980s.

Dody was invited in 1949 to artistically participate with the remaining members of the photographic organization Group f/64, a bastion of the emerging West Coast Photographic Movement. In 1950, she was also one of the founding members of the non-profit organization that published the photographic journal Aperture in 1952, to which she was also a contributor. In 1952, she was co-awarded the prestigious Albert M. Bender Award (known informally in the West as the “Little Guggenheim”) which financed a year's work in photography. Her camera work is represented in dozens of museums and private collections as well as in many photographic books and magazines. She also participated in multiple solo and group exhibitions from 1948 through 2006 in the United States and Japan.

Dody penned commentary on the history of photography and on the techniques of contemporary photographers, focusing on the artistic legacies of Edward Weston and his son Brett Weston. Her articles appeared in many photography books and journals from 1949 through 2003. Her skill in literary criticism was highlighted in her chapter on the novelist Pearl S. Buck in the 1968 book American Winners of the Nobel Literary Prize.

== Most popular photographic works ==
Some of her most popular photographic works include:

- Edward Weston at Rhyolite, Nevada, B/W, 1948
- Ghost Town Kitchen, Rhyolite, Nevada, B/W, 1948
- Pool with Log, Yosemite, California, B/W, 1949
- Black Dune No. 3, Oceano Dunes, California, B/W, 1952
- Porch, Marin County, California, B/W, 1952
- High Sierra Pool, Yosemite, California, B/W, 1950
- Leaves, Garrapata, California, B/W, 1951
- White Dune No. 1, Oceano, California, B/W, 1951
- Lava Rocks, Greasewood, Owens Lake, California, B/W, 1952
- Brett in the Dunes, White Sands, New Mexico, B/W, 1952
- Edward's Desk at Wildcat Hill, Carmel, California, B/W, 1954
- Edward’s Mailbox at Wildcat Hill, Carmel, California, B/W, 1953
- Canal Scene with 'Eros', Venice, Italy, Color, 1976
- Ferro No. 1, Venice, Italy, Color, 1977
- Rusted Metal Drum, California Desert, Near Owens Lake, California, Color, 1988

Her black and white portraits include those of Ansel Adams, Edward Weston and Brett Weston.

== The West Coast Photographic Movement ==
Famous photographic artists of the West Coast Photographic Movement (also known as Straight photography) took a realistic approach to imagery. They created sharp-focus photographs of natural American Western objects and scenery, skillfully composing with subtleties of tone, light and texture. This approach was entirely radical. From 1910 to the early 1930s, the dominant style was East Coast Pictorialism in which objects were shot with haze and gauze to purposely blur the image for a soft-focus effect. The aim was to mimic Impressionist paintings. With the emerging West Coast Movement, photography no longer imitated painting and developed as a separate art form. The new movement spread in the 1950s as the West Coast artists championed the use of natural environmental forms and clarity of detail—very novel concepts at the time.

Dody's close friends and colleagues were pioneers of realistic photography as well as contemporary artists: Minor White, Charis Wilson (second wife of Edward Weston and the famous model of his nude photographic work), Paul Strand, Dorothea Lange, Wynn Bullock, Don Ross, Ruth Bernhard, Willard Van Dyke, Nata Piaskowski, Beaumont Newhall and Nancy Newhall, and artists Georgia O'Keeffe, Morris Graves and Jean Charlot and his wife Zohmah Charlot.

== Biography ==
=== Early life and work (1923–44) ===
Dody—a childhood nickname that she adopted on her own—was born Dora Harrison on April 11, 1923, in New Orleans. Both her parents were early influences on her later career. Abraham Harrison's profession as a filmmaker offered Dody her first introduction to the sights, sounds and smells of film processing. Known as Harry Harrison, he was first a minor league ball player, then a newspaper photographer and finally a producer of the famous Fox Movietone News, the short news and sports newsreels that played from 1928 until 1963 in theaters before the feature films.

Hilda Rosenfield Harrison, a professional woman, was an artist at heart and surrounded herself with creative friends from the famous French Quarter of New Orleans. After Hilda's divorce from Harry, Dody always viewed her mother as a strong role model—independent, appreciating the arts, and working hard to earn a living.

While a teen in New Orleans, Dody was exposed to Pictorialism. Among her mother's circle of associates was the experimental and avant-garde photographer Clarence John Laughlin. His art displayed a strong Impressionistic style. Fourteen-year-old Dody was frequently pressed into service as a model as well as an assistant to carry his props and camera equipment. Laughlin's photos were considered unique because they were often posed in New Orleans graveyards—beautiful but macabre. One of his most famous works depicts the surreal face of Dody hidden behind a half-mask above a cemetery.

=== Exposure to and experience in the arts ===
Dody's early passions were acting, English literature, and poetry. Her acting career began at the age of three when Hilda recognized her daughter's talents, enrolling her in a children's theater group that toured public schools for the next 10 years. At the beginning of World War II when Dody was a teenager, she appeared in many stage plays in New Orleans and was always the standout in theater reviews. She had found an early creative niche.

Dody was tall, willowy, and had blue eyes. She became a Broadway star in her career. The many outstanding reviews of her acting led to a summer scholarship for Dody with the New London Theatre in New Hampshire. To round out her East Coast experience, she also trained in radio at a station in Springfield, Connecticut, voice work to complement her extensive acting background.

Dody's gift for seeing the simple beauties of nature traces back to those summer theater months in the White Mountains of New Hampshire. Raw, untamed vistas left a permanent impression on the young woman and on her future career as a photographer. Dody went on to develop her other artistic skills as a drama and poetry major at Sophie Newcomb College of Tulane University in New Orleans in 1940.

At her mother's urging, Dody transferred to the innovative Black Mountain art college in rural, majestic North Carolina, where she was a student from 1941 to 1943. She took advantage of this unique artistic opportunity and enjoyed the freedom of creativity that underscored the Black Mountain experience.

Many of the school's faculty members were men and women who founded the revolutionary Bauhaus Movement in Berlin. Bauhaus was characterized by classical, unadulterated, pure structure. The colors stressed were black, white, gray and beige. Simplicity and functionality were the by-words. And, in the breathtaking hills of North Carolina, she was once again immersed in pure nature. Dody plunged herself into new ways of seeing simplicity through the various art mediums to which she was exposed.

=== Becoming a photographer (1944–49) ===
Dody decided to marry her Tulane love Bill Diffenderfer in 1944. The couple left New Orleans and headed to San Francisco where he was stationed during World War II. Dody's goal at this point was to find a way to earn a living in an unfamiliar environment.

Characterizing herself as “an escaped Southerner,” she landed—with an introduction by her mother—a position in San Francisco as a researcher-writer for the West Coast Office of War Information. Dody credits this job for her ability to synthesize tremendous amounts of dry data into striking and fluid artistic words. This skill became characteristic of her later writing.

She also worked as a freighter riveter at the Kaiser Shipyards in Richmond, California across the Bay from San Francisco. Fortuitously, photographers Ansel Adams and Dorothea Lange were hired by Fortune Magazine in 1944 to photo-document a 24-hour sequence of the workers at the shipyards. While leaving her shift one afternoon, she noticed a man “capering under a black camera cloth and a big camera on a tripod.” Years later, while working for Ansel, she saw his photograph of a throng of women descending the steps of the shipyard and recognized her own face among the crowd.

In 1946, Dody's war-time marriage unraveled and she divorced. She married a second time, also in 1946, to artist Philip Warren. Unfortunately, Warren became deeply committed to a San Francisco religious movement. She had to decide to either embrace this group or leave the marriage. The couple separated and Dody found a place of her own in San Francisco and began to explore her next step in life.

Naturally drawn to the arts, Dody attended an Edward Weston retrospective organized by Beaumont and Nancy Newhall for the San Francisco Museum of Modern Art in early 1946. She became absolutely transfixed with the imaginative, naturalistic style of the nascent West Coast photographic trend. Dody subsequently discovered Edward's book California and the West (1940). She determined to learn the craft to which she had been exposed as a young girl.

She then sought out Edward Weston in 1947 at the age of 24. While on summer vacation, she drove from San Francisco to the beach near his studio home in Carmel, contemplating how she would possibly summon the nerve to contact him. In her own words in a private journal, she wrote, “I had been given courage. Before it could ebb, I found a public phone and dialed”—and she reached Edward himself. Intrigued by their common interest in photography, Edward asked Dody to meet with him in an hour.

After she arrived at his surprisingly modest bluff-side studio, he showed her, according to Dody's memoirs, print after print of his platinum-developed photographs. Years later she would write privately, “I had never seen anything like these photographs. A wonderful quality of light emanated from them. Some glowed like pearls, some glittered diamond-sharp. Aside from their subject matter, they could be enjoyed solely for this.” Dody described this meeting as “my first stunning lesson in photography.”

Weston mentioned he had just that morning written a letter to Ansel Adams, looking for someone seeking to learn photography in exchange for carrying his bulky large-format camera and to provide a much needed automobile. Edward was developing Parkinson's disease and the physical demands of the profession were difficult for him. This was the era of heavy, wooden large format view cameras with their accompanying tripods, lenses, cut film, film holders, filters and cleansers—all toted around in the field. Dody had a thirst for photography, she had the strong body to carry equipment, and she had driven to Carmel in her own car. There was a swift meeting of creative minds. For the remainder of 1947 through the beginning of 1948, Dody commuted from San Francisco on weekends to learn from Weston the basics of photography.

Edward encouraged Dody to become a portrait photographer to generate revenue for herself, which he himself had done in his early career. She opened a small studio in San Francisco and her solid portraiture work launched her reputation as a photographer.

In early 1948, she moved into “Bodie House,” the guest cottage named after its wood stove at Edward's Wildcat Hill compound, as his full-time assistant. Dody helped Edward in the darkroom and she learned the essential skill of spotting his prints — a process to remove imperfections from photographs, rendering them flawless. On Edward's advice, she acquired her own camera—a wooden Agfa Ansco large format 5”X7” view camera—and began to photograph the panoramic Carmel coast and its subtle intricacies.

In 1949, her reputation caught the attention of Ansel Adams. She assisted the famed photographer for a year during a photographic expedition in Yosemite National Park and then at his studio in San Francisco. Dody learned his celebrated Zone System—his systematic method for precisely defining the relationship between the way the photographer visualizes the photographic subject (determining film exposure) and the final product (development of the film). She also observed how Ansel greatly improved the standards of print reproduction.

After her time at Ansel's studios, Dody returned to Wildcat Hill, where many prominent photographers, artists, and poets gathered around Edward Weston's lively dinner table.

Later, Dody created a photographic collection complementing the verse of Emily Dickinson, her favorite poet. Though unpublished, this body of work serves as an homage to Dody's love of poetry and showcases her ability to marry photography with text.

=== Career turning point (1949) ===
Nineteen forty-nine was a professionally pivotal year for Dody. She was invited to artistically participate with the remaining members of the prestigious organization Group f/64. The group was an association of San Francisco Modernist artists who spearheaded straight photography. Founded in 1932 by William Van Dyke and Ansel Adams, Ansel suggested the group's moniker because f/64 is the lens setting that allows every feature in an image to be sharply focused.

Dody's early camera work then began to be exhibited, purchased and represented in a number of museums and private collections, including the Santa Barbara Museum of Art (1949) and the Chicago Institute of Design (1950).

Dody was the last of Edward Weston's photographic assistants and remained very close to him during the final 11 years of his life as he struggled with his Parkinson's. The final photographs Edward Weston ever took were of a close-up of beach stones, teasingly subtitled "Dody Rocks", and of a portrait of Dody against boulders, at Point Lobos, California (1948).

=== Writing and impact on art history ===
Weston recognized Dody's writing talent and entrusted her to craft the preface to My Camera on Point Lobos in 1949, launching her prolific writing career. He also asked her to edit for this publication portions of his famous Day Books—his intimate journals detailing his evolving photography and comments on his close personal relationships (1950).

Dody was as well a co-founder of the famous journal Aperture, a high-quality magazine for the professional photographer, showcasing the finest images and profiling the field's most acclaimed artists. After two years of preparation, the first issue debuted in Spring, 1952 with Dody as a contributing writer.

The periodical was named for the size of the opening in a camera lens that determines how much light reaches the film. Numerical settings printed on the barrel of the lens, when selected, change the size of the lens opening; this is known as aperture. The higher the number, the more the scene is in focus. Depth of field is thus controlled and enables manipulation of how the scene is captured.

Dody continued to write extensively on the topics of photography and fine arts (see bibliography). Famous photographer Paula Chamlee admires Dody's gifted writing style and notes that Dody's published works “have added to the history of photography in a very meaningful and significant way.”

=== Marriage to Brett Weston (1952) ===
Theodore Brett Weston (1911–1993) developed a more abstract polish to his photographic craft. He served in the Signal Corps in New York during World War II and returned afterward to Carmel to live, first at Wildcat Hill and later in 1948 at Garrapata Canyon (10 miles south of Wildcat Hill), to work in his father's darkroom and to pursue his own photography. He and Dody grew to know each other as they worked on photographic projects and had family meals together. Understanding how fond Edward was of Dody, Brett kept at first a respectful distance, but by March 1950 Dody and he were dating and Dody moved to Brett's home at Garrapata Canyon.

In 1951, Ansel asked Dody and Brett to work with the Polaroid Corporation's Artist Support Program to test its latest self-developing camera, the Polaroid 95 Land Camera and Type 40 film. This first instant camera produced sepia-tone prints that developed in one minute. The couple embarked on a photographic safari from California to New York. Their resulting work was the basis of advertisements for the camera, appearing in many contemporary popular magazines.

They both took some of their best photos in the White Sands of New Mexico in 1952. Dody photographed Brett in the Dunes during that trip. They also shot in Carmel Valley that year. The couple collaborated on several projects and complemented each other—his photographs and her well-penned commentary.

Edward Weston was steadily declining in health due to Parkinson's disease and was unable to gather 100 of his best prints for his 50th Anniversary Portfolio in 1952. Dody helped produce 8,250 prints from Edward's prime 825 negatives for this collection. On the front endpaper of Dody's copy of the 50th Anniversary Portfolio, Edward affectionately wrote, "To Dody-who printed & sweated & spotted, so that this Portfolio becomes her Portfolio-Love always-Edward."

Dody and Brett eventually married at Point Lobos in Carmel, California on December 6, 1952. Even though Dody became known professionally as Dody Weston after marrying Brett, she chose to sign her work “Dody”. Dody later described how difficult it was for her and Brett to survive as creative artists, "We never knew where the next pot of beans was coming from, but it always appeared."

=== Photography career builds (1953–55) ===
Dody's photographic career ignited in 1952 when she was one of the two photographic winners of the prestigious Albert M. Bender Award (known informally in the West as the “Little Guggenheim”), which financed a year's work in photography. She was the second photographer to win the award other than Ansel Adams, who received the honor in 1946. Dody chose as her focus to photo-document Edward's creative environment in Carmel as well as the unique home and surroundings of close friend and edgy West Coast painter Morris Graves.

In 1954–55, she and photographer Nata Piaskowski were curators for the ground-breaking exhibit titled Perceptions—a gallery exposition organized by a San Francisco Bay area photographer's collective. The show was sponsored by the San Francisco Museum of Art. Famed architect and photographer Donald Ross designed this artistic project. Perceptions went on to display at the Smithsonian Institution and abroad.

Dody's marriage to Brett is said to have worsened by 1955 and she moved to Los Angeles. After an attempt at reconciliation in early 1956, their divorce was final by 1957. Dody's move to Southern California became permanent. She found employment as a documentary consultant, researcher, writer and crew member with Hollywood producer Lou Stoumen from 1956 to 1960.

Her screen credits include a Motion Picture Academy Award-nominated documentary The Naked Eye (1956), highlighting Edward's work. She also gained recognition for Stouman's Documentary Short Subject Oscar-winner The True Story of the Civil War (1957), which extensively used still photographs by famous Civil War photographer Mathew Brady.

=== South Seas voyage (1958) ===
In 1958, she signed on for an opportunity aboard the actor Sterling Hayden's schooner Wanderer as a filmmaker's assistant. Hayden, in the middle of a public divorce, made headlines by taking two of his four children on the voyage, contrary to court orders. The crew sailed from San Francisco Bay to Tahiti, where Hayden had planned to film a movie.

Now in her mid-thirties, she took with her to Tahiti a smaller light-weight, hand-held camera (likely her Yashica Copal Yashicaflex TLR), which she used with less frequency until 1977, and added color film to her photographic repertoire. Her South Seas folio is replete with fascinating photographs of the Wanderer, on-deck photos of life aboard the ship, colorful prints of Tahitian women and children, and of artifacts on shore.

The film did not materialize, however, and according to Dody's notes U.S. Camera printed her photographs of paradise in 1961. Dody continued to shoot black and white photography through 1966. She was also tapped to write a chapter on famous novelist Pearl Buck for American Winners of the Nobel Literary Prize, published in 1968.

=== Color photography (1970s–1991) ===
Dody's career in color photography was of necessity. “My body decreed: carry no weight. It was going to be a 35mm camera or nothing. I had to change my standards, or give up photography. I even chose a camera among the many brands whose ground lens most nearly approximated the look of those in larger cameras.”

She eventually selected the Olympus 35mm. The hand-held camera was “designed for action. But I held to the way that I took joy in seeing... and it was not until I arrived in Venice – vulnerable, rotting, splendid Venice — that I finally succumbed to the seductions of color... color bold; color subtle, nuanced; a veritable paint pot of color.”

Some of the most notable of her color photographs are of the gondolas on the Grand Canal in Venice. In a personal note in her journal she kept while in Italy (1977), she wrote, “I specially fell for the gondolas, not as a craft, but as objects d'art ...pieces of sculpture”... and she captured them exquisitely.

Her travels to Hawaii, Italy, France, Mexico and Japan allowed her to produce some of her most famous color photographs.

=== Partnership with Daniel M. Thompson (1960–2008) ===
Early in 1958, before Dody left for the South Pacific, she met Daniel Michel Thompson, an aerospace company executive, sculptor and painter, and environmental writer. Mutual friends had invited them to a dinner party in Los Angeles and they discovered their personalities and interests were compatible. They dated for two years and then married in November, 1960. Dan helped research and edit her writings over the next 40 years.

During this phase of her career, her photography was known under the professional name of Dody Weston Thomson. Dody contributed to a 1965 article in Aperture Monograph edited by Nancy Newhall: Edward Weston, Photographer. Her major written work was her personal recollection of Edward Weston entitled “Edward Weston: A Memoir” published in the Canadian journal, Malahat Review, in 1970 and in 1972.

=== Later years: writing, lecturing and exhibiting (1980–2006) ===
As Dody matured, the physical rigors of active photographic expeditions were difficult to undertake and her professional career shifted to writing, exhibiting and lecturing. Dody spent her last active decades exhibiting her photographs, working on documentary projects, writing about photography and about the legacy of Edward Weston, and lecturing at numerous colleges, art museums and fine arts institutions.

Dody took her final black-and-white photograph in 1966 and her last color photograph of wet kelp on a tide pool rock at Point Lobos in 1997. Her final exhibit and public speaking engagement was at Los Angeles Valley College in 2006 as part of the retrospective Perceptions, Bay Area Photography, 1945-1960 curated by Dennis Reed. Dody gave the opening lecture and her image White Dune No. 1 was displayed as part of the show. Reed reports that Dody was instrumental in helping him develop the installation. Thus, Dody's career extended 59 years (1947-2006).

The most significant article she wrote during this time period was “West Coast ‘50s” about the West Coast Photographic Movement, which was published in Exposure Magazine in 1981. Her final article reflecting on the lasting contribution of Edward Weston appeared in Weston: Life Work (2003).

Of all the many symposiums in which she participated, the most significant was the May, 1998 panel in San Francisco, "Through Another Lens: A Historical and Critical Look at California Arts Photography in the 1930s & 1940s". This stellar forum included Dody, Charis, Cole (Edward Weston's youngest son) Rondal Partridge (son of photographer Imogen Cunningham) and Seema Weatherwax (former assistant to Ansel Adams).

In 2006 she received a Certificate of Recognition from the California State Legislative Assembly for her contribution to the fine arts, to the history of photography and as a founder of Aperture magazine.

== Comments by other photographers ==
Contemporary photographer Merg Ross, son of photographer Don Ross, commented on Dody's two careers in both black and white and color photography. He calls her black and white photos "her jewels in the crown... the subtle, delicate, well-composed strong images." Ross's favorite is her black and white composition of pine cones in a pond entitled High Sierra Pool (Yosemite, 1950): "The tones of the pine cones showed her skill as a technician and her mastery of technique."

Rondal Partridge, son of famous photographer Imogen Cunningham, summarized Dody as being "the most focused person I had ever met. She was quick-thinking; she knew the 'who, what, when and where' of photographic composition and she knew where the rainbow was... and she went after it."

== Legacy ==
Dody passed away at her residence in Los Angeles, California on October 14, 2012. She was 89.

In August 2013, the Thompson Family Trust donated 491 original black-and-white and color prints of Dody's photography and her document archive to Scripps College, Claremont, California. In September 2014, the Thompson Family Trust donated 234 original black-and-white and color prints of Dody's photography to the Center for Creative Photography, Tucson, AZ. In September 2016, Helen Harrison donated approximately 150 distinct black-and-white and color prints of Dody's photography, along with copies, to the Inland Empire Museum of Art in San Bernardino County, California.

== Cameras ==
During her career, Dody worked with several cameras.

Large Format:
Agfa 4 X 5

Medium Format:
Copal 2 ¼ X 3 ¼
Zenza Bronica 6 X 4.5, 6 X 6 & 6 X 7 cm
Polaroid 95 Land Camera
Yashicaflex TLR

Small Format:
Olympus 35mm
Yashica Copal

== General data ==
Fields

- Fine Art photography
- Landscape photography
- Still-Life photography
- Portrait photography
- Abstract photography
- Modern photography

Family

- Brett Weston (former husband), photographer
- Edward Weston (former father-in-law), photographer
- Abraham “Harry” Harrison (father), filmmaker
- Hilda Rosenfield Harrison (mother), government employee
- Daniel M. Thompson (husband), aerospace company executive
- Alvin B. Harrison (brother), architect
- Helen C. Harrison (niece, personal conservator, estate trustee), university professor

Notable portrait models

- Edward Weston
- Ansel Adams
- Brett Weston
- Charis Wilson

== Bibliography ==
Most popular photographic works

- Edward Weston at Rhyolite, B/W, Nevada, 1948
- Ghost Town Kitchen, B/W, Rhyolite, Nevada, 1948
- Pool with Log, B/W, Yosemite, California 1949
- High Sierra Pool, B/W, Yosemite, California, 1950
- Leaves, B/W, Garrapata, California, 1951
- White Dune No. 1, B/W, Oceano, California, 1951
- Black Dune No. 3, B/W, Oceano, California, 1952
- Lava Rocks, B/W, Greasewood, Owens Lake, California, 1952
- Edward's Desk at Wildcat Hill, B/W, Carmel, California, 1954
- Edward’s Mailbox at Wildcat Hill, B/W, Carmel, California, 1953
- Canal Scene with 'Eros', Color, Venice, Italy, 1976
- Ferro No. 1, Color, Venice, Italy, 1977
- Rusted Metal Drum, California Desert, Color, Near Owens Lake, California, 1988

Published photographs

- Aperture (Vol. 1, No. 3, 1949)
- Aperture (Cover Photograph, Vol. 2, No. 2, 1952; Lava Rocks, 1952)
- Aperture (Vol. 2, No. 3, 1952; Pool with Log, 1949 for “Photography as Art” article)
- American Photography (January 1951 and March 1951)
- Photography of the World (Heibonsha Publishers, Tokyo, Japan, 1958, hardcover)
- Photo Monde, Paris (1960)
- U.S. Camera (1957 and 1961)
- U.S. Camera, Tahitian Photographs (1961)
- Frontispiece for "Edward Weston: The Flame of Recognition", ed. Nancy Newhall (1965)
- Time-Life Books of Photography, “The Great Themes” (1970)
- Time-Life Books of Photography, “The Great Themes” (1975)
- Monterey Peninsula Museum of Art Catalog, “The Monterey Photographic Tradition: The Weston Years” (1986)
- "Dody Weston Thompson: Photographs, Monterey Peninsula Museum of Art", Introduction by Richard Gadd, Executive Director (1997)

Solo exhibitions

- Santa Barbara Museum of Art, CA (1949, 1981)
- The Chicago Institute of Design, IL (1950)
- The George Eastman House (Inter’l Museum of Photography), Rochester, NY (1955)
- The Stephen White Gallery, Los Angeles, CA (1976)
- Otis Art Institute, Los Angeles, CA (1980)
- Rio Hondo College, Whittier, CA (1981)
- Palos Verdes Art Association, Palos Verdes, CA (1984)
- Monterey Peninsula Museum of Art in California (1986–88, 1997–98)
- The Levin Gallery, Monterey, CA (July–September 1997)
- The Art Gallery, Chico State University, Chico, CA (February–March 1998)
- The Carnegie Museum of Art, Oxnard, CA (December 1999-February 2000)
- The Clark Humanities Museum, Scripps College, Claremont, CA (April–May 2016)

Group Exhibitions

- The San Francisco Museum of Modern Art “Perceptions” (Bay Area Photographers), San Francisco, CA, (1954)
- The Smithsonian Museum, Washington, D.C., “Perceptions”, which also traveled in Europe (1955–57)
- Fine Arts Gallery, “Creative Photography,” University of Kentucky (1960s)
- The Print Gallery, “Creative Photography” (later the Josephus Daniels Gallery), Carmel, CA (1979)
- The Los Angeles Institute of Contemporary Art, Los Angeles, CA (1980)
- Pasadena City College Gallery, Pasadena, CA (1981)
- Los Angeles County Museum of Art, Los Angeles, CA (1981)
- Santa Barbara Museum of Art, Santa Barbara, CA (1981)
- UCLA Grunewald Center for Graphic Arts, Los Angeles, CA (1981)
- Minneapolis Institute of Art, Minneapolis, MN (1981)
- Cypress College Gallery, “California and West Coast Photography”, Cypress, CA (1982)
- Montgomery Gallery of Claremont Colleges, Claremont California, through Pomona College Art Department (1983)
- Monterey Peninsula Museum of Art, Monterey, CA, then a traveling show in South America and Israel (1986–88)
- Center for Creative Photography, Tucson, AZ, “Essential Art”, Traveling Show (1993–94)
- Los Angeles Valley College, Los Angeles, CA, "Perceptions, Bay Area Photography, 1945-1960" (2006)
- Allentown Art Museum, Allentown, PA, "Weston's Women: Cycles of Influence" (2015)

Photographs in public collections

- The George Eastman House, Rochester, New York (1955)
- The Chicago Institute of Design (1950)
- The McAlpin Collection of Princeton University
- The New York Museum of Modern Art
- The Santa Barbara Museum of Art
- The Los Angeles County Museum of Art (1981)
- The Karuizawa Museum of Photography in Japan (1992)
- The Monterey Peninsula Museum of Art in California, (1986-88 & 1998)
- The Center for Creative Photography in Tucson, AZ (1993)
- The International Museum of Photography, Rochester, New York
- The VanDeren Coke Collection at the University of New Mexico
- The Minneapolis Institute of Art
- The Chandler Gallery of Scripps College (2013)
- The Wilson Center, Los Angeles (2013)
- The Center for Creative Photography (2014)
- The Inland Empire Museum of Art (2016)

Guest Curator

- With Nata Piaskowski, for "Perceptions," major group show of San Francisco area photographers at the San Francisco Museum of Modern Art. Later circulated for one year by the Smithsonian Institution Museum, 1954 & 1955

Publication credits

- Wrote introduction and edited sections of Edward Weston's Daybooks for "My Camera on Point Lobos" by Edward Weston, 1949 & 1985.
- “Weston, Adams, Strand,” American Photography, January 1951
- “Brett Weston, Photographer,” American Photography, September 1952
- “Photography As Art: Personal Opinions,” Aperture, Vol. 1, No. 3, Oct. 1952
- “Perceptions” Article about the “Perceptions Exhibit,” U.S. Camera, Aug. 1954
- “Perceptions” Article about the “Perceptions Exhibit”, Aperture, Vol. 2, No. 4
- “Brett Weston, Photographer,” American Photography, September 1954
- Chapter on Pearl Buck for American Winners of the Nobel Literary Prize, French & Kidd, eds., University of Oklahoma Press, 1968
- “Edward Weston: A Memoir,” Malahat Review, University of Victoria, B.C., Canada, 1970 & 1972
- “Edward Weston” Untitled No. 1, First Edition, The Friends of Photography, Carmel, California, 1972
- “Introduction to the Landscape Portfolio": Photographs by Donald Ross, 1979
- “Why Is That Photographer Working in the Graveyard: Notes on the Imagery of Death,” Journal of the Los Angeles Institute of Contemporary Art, February 1979
- “West Coast Fifties,” Exposure, Issue 18:2, 1981
- Essay by Dody Weston Thompson in Brett Weston: A Personal Selection, Photography West Graphics, Carmel, California, 1986
- “Talking With Edward,” Catalog of the Monterey Peninsula Museum of Art for “The Photographs of Dody Weston Thompson Exhibit,” Carmel, California, 1997
- “Edward Weston: Myths and Memories,” Essay by Dody Weston Thompson in Edward

Weston: Life Work. Photographs from the Collection of Judith G. Hochberg and Michael P. Mattis, Sarah M. Lowe and Dody Weston Thompson, Lodima Press, First Edition, 2003

Production credits

- "The Naked Eye", Lou Stoumen Production, Camera Eye Pictures, Los Angeles, California, 1956, Academy Award-nominated documentary, researcher and consultant
- "The True Story of the Civil War", Lou Stouman Production, Camera Eye Pictures, Los Angeles, California, 1957, Academy Award-winning documentary, researcher
- "Operation Dames", Lou Stouman Production, Camera Eye Pictures, Los Angeles, CA, 1959, script supervisor
- "Prehistoric America", Lou Stoumen Production, Camera Eye Pictures for McGraw-Hill, Los Angeles, California, 1960, researcher.

== Awards and honors ==
- 1949: Creative participation with group f/64 photographic members
- 1950: A founder of Aperture magazine
- 1952: Co-winner of the Albert M. Bender Award for creative work in photography
- 1956: Screen Credit, Academy Award-Nominated Documentary, The Naked Eye, Lou Stoumen Production, Camera Eye Pictures
- 1957: Screen Credit, Academy Award-Winning Documentary, The True Story of the Civil War, Lou Stoumen Production, Camera Eye Pictures
- 2006: Certificate of Recognition, California State Legislative Assembly

== Articles and videos ==
Published articles and produced videos about Dody Weston Thompson

- Time.com: In Memoriam: "Photographers Who Died in 2012"
- Richard W. Gadd, Dody Weston Thompson Photographs, January 1, 1997, 23 pp. (available on amazon.com)
- Ira Latour, “Mind and Eye,” Dody Weston Thompson Photographs, Monterey Museum of Art, Monterey, California, June 14-August 31, 1997.
- Steven Lewis, "Interview with Dody Weston Thompson," International Museum of Photography at George Eastman House, Conducted December 3, 1976 in Los Angeles, California, 50 pages.
- Josef Woodard, “Famous Name Looms Large in Show of Dody Weston Thompson's Work,” Los Angeles Times, Now Section, February 6, 2000.
- "At the Center of the Weston Circle: Dody Weston Thompson", Black & White Magazine, No. 37, June 2005, author unknown.
- Robert L. Backstrand and Helen C. Harrison, "Exposures: The History of American Landscape Photography," Parts 1 and 4, January 26, 2007.
- Daniel Cooney, “Associate Insights: The Collection of Dody Weston Thompson,” video on iGavel Auctions, Manhattan, New York, 2012.
