= Aperture (magazine) =

International quarterly photography journal

- Cover of the Fall 2024 issue
- Editor: Michael Famighetti (2013–present)
- Categories: Photography
- Frequency: 4×/year
- Publisher: Dana Triwush (Copublisher, 2008–2011; Publisher, 2011–present)
- Founder: Ansel Adams, Melton Ferris, Dorothea Lange, Ernest Louie, Barbara Morgan, Beaumont Newhall, Nancy Newhall, Dody Warren, and Minor White
- Founded: 1952
- Company: Aperture Foundation
- Country: United States
- Based in: New York, NY
- Language: English
- Website: www.aperture.org
- ISSN: 0003-6420

Aperture magazine, based in New York City, is an international quarterly journal specializing in photography. Founded in 1952, Aperture magazine is the flagship publication of Aperture Foundation.

The headquarters of Aperture magazine and the Aperture Foundation and Gallery are at 547 West 27th Street, 4th floor, New York, NY 10001.

== Publication ==
Aperture is published four times a year, in Spring, Summer, Fall, and Winter. It features photographs by established and emerging photographers, as well as artists experimenting with photo-related media. Each issue is usually themed and includes writings by critics, scholars, photography practitioners, and others involved in the field of photography.

== History ==
=== 1952–1975 ===
The magazine was founded in 1952 by a consortium of photographers and proponents of photography: Ansel Adams, Melton Ferris, Dorothea Lange, Ernest Louie, Barbara Morgan, Beaumont Newhall, Nancy Newhall, Dody Warren, and Minor White. It was the first journal since Alfred Stieglitz's Camera Work to explore photography as a fine art. The journal's mission, as stated in its inaugural issue:

Aperture has been originated to communicate with serious photographers and creative people everywhere, whether professional, amateur or student... Aperture is intended to be a mature journal in which photographers can talk straight to each other, discuss the problems that face photography as profession and art, share their experiences, comment on what goes on, descry the new potentials. We, who have founded this journal, invite others to use Aperture as a common ground for the advancement of photography.

Minor White was appointed by the founders to be the editor of the magazine, which was at first published out of San Francisco. The magazine's dimensions were initially modest (9 3/8 by 6 1/4 in or 240 by 160 mm), and in its first two decades the photographs discussed and published in its pages were exclusively black and white (the preferred mode of most art photographers of the era). Many early issues were loosely organized around thematic concepts (such as "The Creative Approach" [vol. 2, no. 2, 1953], "The Controversial 'Family of Man'" [vol. 3, no. 2, 1955], and "Substance and Spirit of Architectural Photography" [vol. 6, no. 4, 1958]), or were monographic publications (the first of these was vol. 6, no. 1, 1958, on Edward Weston).

In 1953, the editorial offices moved to Rochester, New York. (White joined the staff of the George Eastman House, and in 1955 began teaching at the Rochester Institute of Technology.) White was assisted with the magazine's editorial and production tasks by Peter C. Bunnell. From the outset, the magazine was appreciated by its readers as "a much needed forum for serious photographers." In 1962, vol. 10, no. 4, a monograph on photographer Frederick Sommer, was the first of many issues to be published also as a trade book.

Aperture, Inc., became a nonprofit foundation in 1963. In 1964, Michael E. Hoffman, a former student of White, became the foundation's publisher and executive director; he would shape the magazine and all other aspects of the foundation until his death in 2001. In 1965, Aperture launched a full-fledged book-publishing program (with Edward Weston: Photographer, The Flame of Recognition, edited by Nancy Newhall) that evolved in tandem with the magazine over the following decades. Beginning in the mid-1960s, the magazine's production was overseen by Stevan A. Baron (who supervised the production of nearly all of Aperture's publications until his retirement in 2003).

In 1966, Aperture's production department was moved to New York City; before the end of the decade, the foundation itself established headquarters in Millerton, New York. The magazine faced perpetual financial challenges in this period; there was discussion of ceasing publication in 1967, but White was encouraged by the creativity and business acumen of Hoffman, writing in an editorial: "When Michael Hoffman became the publisher of Aperture, its physical growth was assured and a new cycle was started." In 1975, Helen Levitt's photographs of New York City were published as the first full-color portfolio in the magazine (vol. 19, no. 4, 1975). This era also included monographic issues on the work of Edward S. Curtis (vol. 16, no. 4, 1972); Clarence John Laughlin (vol. 17, nos. 3–4, 1973); and P. H. Emerson (vol. 19, nos. 1–2, 1975), as well as an issue devoted to the theme of "The Snapshot" (vol. 19, no. 1, 1974, edited by Jonathan Green).

=== 1976–2001 ===
On June 24, 1976, Minor White died of a heart attack after a prolonged illness. In the same year, with issue 77, the magazine moved to a new numbering system (no longer published in annual volumes, issues were now numbered as individual publications) and its format was enlarged to 11 3/8 by 9 9/16 inches (289 by 243 mm). In 1979, with issue 82, a new design by Malcolm Grear was unveiled; from this point, Aperture's format and look remained basically unchanged for more than twenty years.

Under Michael Hoffman, Aperture was developed by editors including Carole Kismaric, Steve Dietz, Lawrence Frascella, Mark Holborn, and Nan Richardson, while Hoffman always played an integral part in each issue's conception (and was sometimes credited as Editor on mastheads). Hoffman's life partner of 20 years, Diane Lyon, AKA Diane Hoffman, provided assistance. Chief among a group of designers for the magazine in this period was Wendy Byrne (also a principal designer of many Aperture books).

In 1984, Aperture's headquarters moved to a five-story brownstone at 20 East 23rd Street in New York; in 1989, the building's second floor was transformed into the Burden Gallery, named for longtime Aperture supporter Shirley C. Burden. The 23rd Street building was Aperture's home until 2005.

Issues of Aperture during this period were still organized around thematic concepts, such as "Swimmers" (issue 111); "New Southern Photography" (issue 115); "Beyond Wilderness" (issue 119); or monographs of individual photographers. Most issues were edited by members of Aperture's in-house editorial staff; others were guest-edited by outside aficionados; among the editors were Mark Holborn, Nan Richardson, and Melissa Harris. Charles Hagen was the chief editor of the magazine from 1988 to 1991.

Harris became the magazine's principal editor in 1992; under her guidance over the following two decades Aperture would place increased focus on social issues, as well as photo-based work, film, video, and new forms of digital media. Harris furthered the magazine's longtime practice of including writings by both photography specialists and others, with a view to widening Aperture's audience and scope. From 1992 to 2002, Harris generally edited two issues of the magazine a year, and invited outside editors to organize and conceptualize the remaining two. Among the guest editors during this time were Rebecca Busselle, Peggy Roalf, Michael Sand, Diana C. Stoll, and Andrew Wilkes. Along with Wendy Byrne, Roger Gorman and Yolanda Cuomo were also frequently employed as issue designers in this period.

Harris and Hoffman were married in 1998. The magazine was redesigned by Cuomo with issue 159 (Spring 2000); from this point and through the next thirteen years, Cuomo remained the magazine's art director, and issues of Aperture were no longer thematically focused. During this period, the magazine continued to explore photography in its many varied forms, as the medium underwent radical changes with the advent of digitization, the Internet, and social media.

After 36 years as publisher and executive director of Aperture, Michael Hoffman died unexpectedly of complications from meningitis on November 23, 2001, at the age of 59, as preparations were underway for Aperture magazine's fiftieth anniversary. He was survived by Harris, as well as by his two children (by Katharine Carter, his first wife), Matthew Perkins Hoffman and Sarah Warren Hoffman. In Aperture 167 (Summer 2002), curator, critic, and frequent contributor to Aperture Mark Haworth-Booth observed:

Michael E. Hoffman was a brave, bold, and occasionally bloody-minded photography publisher.... Hoffman moved mountains to create marvelous publications—over 450 books and exhibition catalogs, plus more than a hundred issues of the magazine. He charmed to raise money. He cajoled and inspired authors, photographers, designers, editors, printers, and co-publishers. He was driven and visionary. He delighted and infuriated the readers of his publications and the visitors to his elegant and original exhibitions. He changed the cultural landscape and many lives for the better.

=== 2002–2012 ===
In celebration of the magazine's jubilee year, 2002, Aperture published the book Photography Past/Forward: Aperture at 50, featuring vintage photographs as well as never-before-published works, and a comprehensive history of the magazine and the foundation by veteran Aperture contributing editor R. H. Cravens. The publication appeared also as issues 168 and 169 of the magazine. Aperture's fiftieth anniversary was commemorated with a series of exhibitions at fifty venues throughout New York City.

In the years following Hoffman's death, the foundation was headed by a series of interim directors, and then by Ellen Harris (2003–7) and Juan García de Oteyza (2008–10). In 2005 Aperture moved to its present location at 547 West 27th Street, in New York's Chelsea district. In 2010 Chris Boot was named Executive Director of the foundation, beginning his duties in 2011.

Along with its print edition, Aperture began a subscriber-based online version of the magazine via Zinio with issue 201 (Winter 2010); and then via Nook with issue 207 (Summer 2012).

Since Fall 2011, The PhotoBook Review—a newsprint book-review publication—has been distributed twice a year to subscribers of Aperture, with every other issue of the magazine.

In 2012, Aperture's sixtieth anniversary was commemorated with the publication of Aperture Magazine Anthology—The Minor White Years: 1952–1976: a collection of writings and documents from the journal's first quarter-century of publication, edited by Peter Bunnell. The magazine's editorial staff put plans in place for a major relaunch of Aperture, with a new focus on the changing state of photography. Melissa Harris assumed the title of Editor in Chief at Aperture Foundation, and Michael Famighetti stepped into the role of Editor of Aperture magazine.

=== 2013–present ===
Issue 210 (Spring 2013), titled "Hello, Photography", inaugurated Aperture's relaunch, with a return to thematically based issues and a new focus on photography's contemporary practitioners and platforms. Since then, Aperture has distinguished itself from numerous other photography magazines that have emerged since 2000, with its stated aim to serve as a "guide to the world of contemporary photography that combines the finest writing with inspiring photographic portfolios." The magazine's current designers are Henrik Kubel and Scott Williams of the British firm A2/SW/HK; the magazine's new format features an increased number of pages, separate sections devoted to "Words" and "Pictures" (printed on different paper stocks), and a larger trim size: 12 by 9 1/4 inches (300 mm × 230 mm). Beginning with issue 210, the digital version of the magazine has been distributed via Kindle.

=== Notable issues ===
Aperture vol. 1, no. 1 (1952)
This inaugural issue includes an introductory text by Aperture's founders, Minor White's essay "Exploratory Camera", and Nancy Newhall's "The Caption", as well as photographs by Ansel Adams, Dorothea Lange, Lisette Model, and Minor White.

Aperture vol. 10, no. 4 (1962)
Monographic issue conceived, designed, and written by photographer Frederick Sommer (also released as a trade book, Frederick Sommer).

"Edward Weston, Photographer", vol. 12, nos. 1–2 (1965—expanded from vol. 6, no. 1, 1958)
Double issue, edited by Nancy Newhall, devoted to the work of Weston. An expanded version was published as a trade book, Edward Weston: Photographer, The Flame of Recognition.

"Light", vol. 14, no. 1 (1968)
The first of four issues that accompanied exhibitions organized by Minor White at the Hayden Gallery at the Massachusetts Institute of Technology (MIT).

"Ralph Eugene Meatyard: Emblems and Rites", vol. 18, nos. 3–4 (1974)
A monographic double issue, guest-edited by James Baker Hall, devoted to the work of self-taught Kentucky photographer Meatyard; also published as a trade book.

"New Southern Photography", no. 115 (Summer 1989)
Edited by Charles Hagen and Nan Richardson, this issue focuses on both established and emerging artists practicing in the U.S. South.

"The Body in Question", no. 121 (Fall 1990)
The first issue edited by Melissa Harris, addressing censorship and images of the body.

"40th Anniversary", no. 129 (Fall 1992)
Commemorating four decades of Aperture's publication, this issue includes a compendium of photographs and writings by friends of the magazine, with a commissioned cover image by Robert Rauschenberg.

"50th Anniversary", nos. 168/169 (Fall/Winter 2002)
A retrospective compilation of photographs, with a textual history of Aperture's first half-century by R. H. Cravens; also published as a hardcover trade book, Photography Past/Forward: Aperture at 50.

Aperture, no. 204 (Fall 2011)
Published on the tenth anniversary of the September 11, 2001, attacks, this issue includes a portfolio of photographs and critical writings addressing the radically altering state of photography, titled "The Anxiety of Images."

"Hello, Photography", no. 210 (Spring 2013)
The first issue of Aperture's relaunch, including photographs and writings addressing the myriad new forms and directions the medium is taking.

"Documentary, Expanded", no. 214 (Spring 2014)
Produced with guest editor Susan Meiselas, this issue considers the impact of new media on socially engaged documentary work.

=== Related exhibitions ===
Numerous thematic issues of Aperture magazine have been produced to accompany related exhibitions, presented at Aperture's own Burden Gallery and Aperture Gallery, and at other venues. Notable among these exhibitions:

- Light,^{7} Hayden Gallery, Massachusetts Institute of Technology (MIT), Cambridge, Massachusetts, 1968 (with Aperture vol. 14, no. 1, 1968)
- Be-ing Without Clothes, Hayden Gallery, MIT, Cambridge, Massachusetts, 1970 (with Aperture vol. 15, no. 3, 1970)
- Octave of Prayer, Hayden Gallery, MIT, Cambridge, Massachusetts, 1972 (with Aperture vol. 17, no. 1, 1972)
- Clarence John Laughlin: The Personal Eye, Philadelphia Museum of Art, 1973–74 (with Aperture vol. 17, nos. 3–4, 1973; also issued as a trade book)
- Celebrations, Hayden Gallery, MIT, Cambridge, Massachusetts, 1974 (with Aperture vol. 18, no. 2, 1974)
- Bill Brandt: Behind the Camera; Photographs 1928–1983, Philadelphia Museum of Art, 1985 (with Aperture 99, 1985; also issued as a trade book)
- Josef Sudek: Poet of Prague, Philadelphia Museum of Art, 1990 (with Aperture 117/18, 1990/91; also issued as a trade book)
- The Body in Question, Burden Gallery, New York, 1990 (with Aperture 121, 1990; also issued as a trade book)
- Albert Renger-Patzsch: Joy Before the Object, Philadelphia Museum of Art, 1993 (with Aperture 131, 1993)
- Immagini Italiane, Collezione Guggenheim, Venice, 1993 (with Aperture 132, 1993)
- France: New Visions, Burden Gallery, New York, 1996 (with Aperture 142, 1996)
- Delirium, Ricco/Maresca Gallery, New York, 1995 (with Aperture 148, 1997)
- Photography Past/Forward, a multipart exhibition presented at fifty venues throughout New York City, including the Arsenal Gallery in Central Park, City Hall, Rockefeller Center, Ellis Island, Baruch College, and Snug Harbor Cultural Center, 2002 (with Aperture 168/169, 2002; also issued as a trade book)

== Editors ==
- Minor White (1952–1971)
- Michael E. Hoffman (1972–82)
- Carole Kismaric (1983–84)
- Mark Holborn (1985–86)
- Lawrence Frascella (1986–87)
- Nan Richardson (1987–90)
- Steve Dietz (1987–88)
- Charles Hagen (1988–91)
- Melissa Harris (Editor, 1992–2001; Editor-in-Chief, 2002–Spring 2013)
- Michael Famighetti (Editor, Spring 2013–present)

== Publishers ==
Aperture magazine has been published independently since its inception in 1952; since 1963 it has been a central function of Aperture Foundation. The following have held the title of Publisher on the magazine's masthead:

- Michael E. Hoffman
- Betty Russell
- Michelle Dunn Marsh (Associate Publisher, 2006–7; Copublisher, 2008–11)
- Dana Triwush (Copublisher, 2008–11; Publisher, 2011–present)

== Awards and prizes ==
- National Magazine Awards
  - General Excellence (circulation under 100,000), winner 2004
  - General Excellence (circulation under 100,000), finalist 2006, 2008, 2009, 2010, 2011
  - General Excellence, Thought-Leader Magazines, finalist 2012
  - Photojournalism, finalist 2007
  - Photo Portfolio/Photo-Essay, finalist 2005, 2006
- Lucie Awards
  - Photography Magazine of the Year, winner 2007, 2010, 2013
  - 2015: International Photography Awards, "Book Publisher of the Year Classic" category for Tiny: Streetwise Revisited (2015) by Mary Ellen Mark.
- Folio Awards, Gold "Eddie", winner 2005
- Pictures of the Year International, Best Use of Photography in a Magazine, first-place winner 1999
