= Straight photography =

Photography with a sharp focus and detail

Pure photography or straight photography refers to photography that attempts to depict a scene or subject in sharp focus and detail, in accordance with the qualities that distinguish photography from other visual media, particularly painting. Originating as early as 1904, the term was used by critic Sadakichi Hartmann in the magazine Camera Work, and later promoted by its editor, Alfred Stieglitz, as a more pure form of photography than Pictorialism. Once popularized by Stieglitz and other notable photographers, such as Paul Strand, it later became a hallmark of Western photographers, such as Edward Weston, Ansel Adams and others.

Although taken by some to mean lack of manipulation, straight photographers in fact applied many common darkroom techniques to enhance the appearance of their prints. Rather than factual accuracy, the term came to imply a specific aesthetic typified by higher contrast and rich tonality, sharp focus, aversion to cropping, and a Modernism-inspired emphasis on the underlying abstract geometric structure of subjects.

== The West Coast Photographic Movement ==
From 1910 to the early 1930s, the dominant style was East Coast Pictorialism in which objects were shot with haze and gauze to purposely blur the image for a soft focus effect. The aim was to mimic Impressionist paintings. With the emerging West Coast Movement, photography no longer imitated painting and developed as a separate art form. The new movement spread in the 1950s as the West Coast artists championed the use of natural environmental forms and clarity of detail—very novel concepts at the time.

Artists of The West Coast Photographic Movement embraced and developed straight photography in the 1930s. In his autobiography, Ansel Adams used the terms straight photography and pure photography. He describes pure photography as, "... defined as possessing no qualities of technique, composition or idea, derivative of any other art form". Practitioners of this approach created sharp-focus photographs of natural American Western objects and scenery, skilfully composed with subtleties of tone, light and texture, revealing every possible detail in the negatives. This approach was entirely radical and stirred the wrath of many in the local art world. Well known photographers, including Ansel Adams, Edward Weston, his son Brett Weston, Imogen Cunningham, Dody Weston Thompson and Berenice Abbott are considered innovators and practitioners of this style.

This was a close knit community of friends and colleagues. Most were pioneers of realistic photography but there were contemporary artists who also admired and championed this movement. Notable artists and photographers included: Dody Weston Thompson, Ansel Adams, Minor White, Charis Wilson (second wife of Edward Weston and the famous model of his nude photographic work), Paul Strand, Dorothea Lange, Wynn Bullock, Don Ross, William Garnett, Ruth Bernhard, Willard Van Dyke, Nata Piaskowski, Beaumont Newhall and Nancy Newhall, and artists Georgia O'Keeffe, Morris Graves and Jean Charlot and his wife Zohmah Charlot. Many other photographic artists of the time considered themselves practitioners of this West Coast counterculture and even formed a group known as Group f/64 to highlight their efforts and set themselves apart from the East Coast pictorialism movement.

This emphasis on the sharp and detailed silver prints dominated modernist photographic aesthetics into the 1970s.
