= The Terminal (photograph) =

Photograph by Alfred Stieglitz

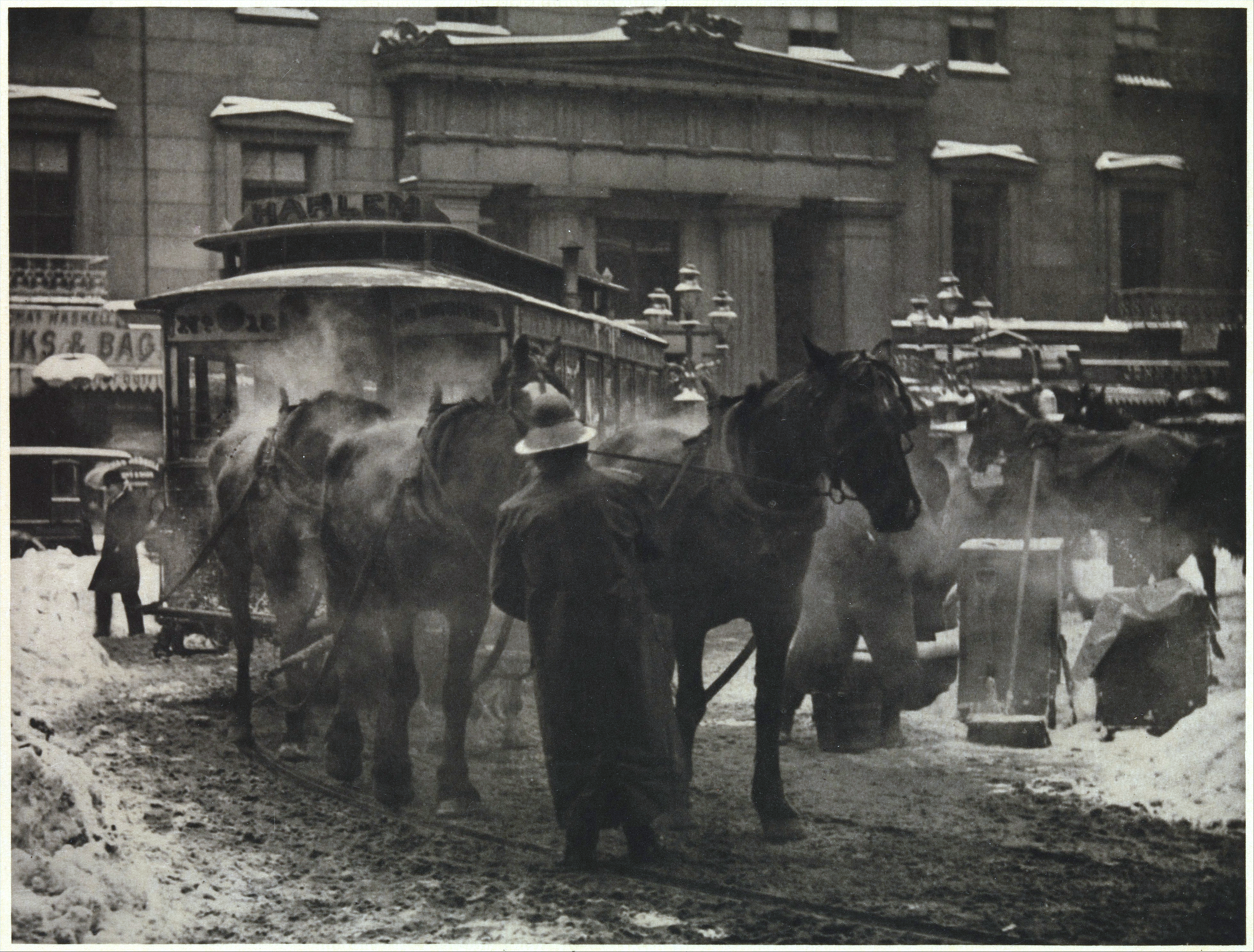
The Terminal (1893) by Alfred Stieglitz

The Terminal is a black and white photograph taken by Alfred Stieglitz in 1893. The photograph was taken in New York using the small 4 x 5 camera, which was a more practical instrument to document the city life than the 8 x 10 view camera, who could only work with a tripod.

== History and description ==
This is one of the pictures that Stieglitz took using this medium, following his aim to elevate photography to an art status. Stieglitz described the origin of this picture: "From 1893 to 1895 I often walked the streets of New York downtown, near the East River, taking my hand camera with me... [One day] I found myself in front of the old Post Office... It was extremely cold. Snow lay on the ground. A driver in a rubber coat was watering his steaming car horses."

The picture is devoid of any romantic intention, just depicting the driver watering his horses in front of the Astor House south of city hall park. Stieglitz’s work can be seen as an example of pictorialism and what would be called later straight photography.

== Public collections ==
There are prints of this photograph at the Metropolitan Museum of Art, New York, the National Gallery of Art, Washington, D.C., the Art Institute of Chicago and the J. Paul Getty Museum, in Los Angeles.
