= Cabbage Leaf =

Photograph by Edward Weston

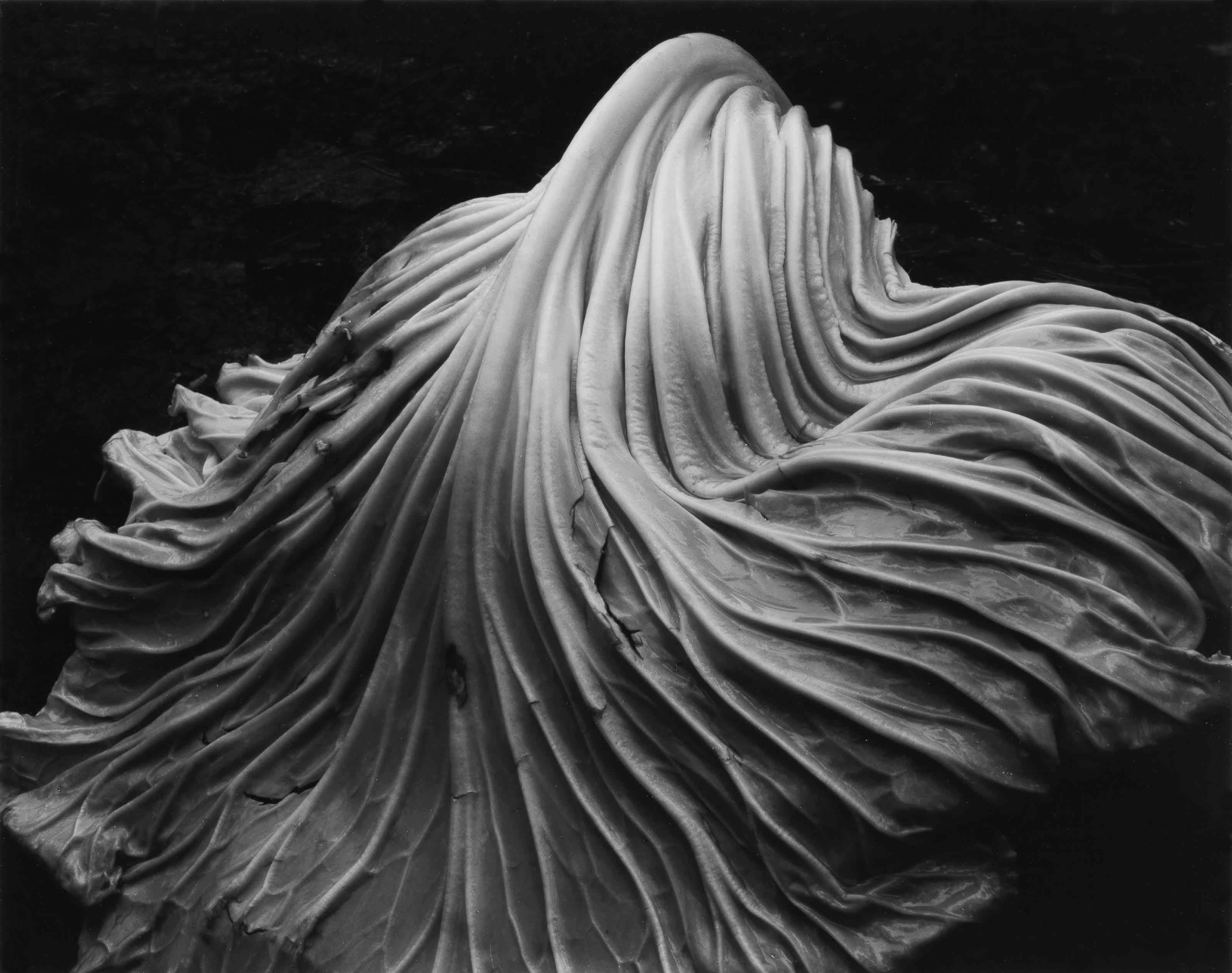
Cabbage Leaf (1931) by Edward Weston

Cabbage Leaf is a black and white photograph taken by Edward Weston in 1931. The picture demonstrates the artist renewed interest in the physical textures of vegetables, seashells and other objects that were the subject of many of his photographs at this time.

== History and description ==
Weston took attention in particular to cabbages and would photograph several arrangements of this vegetable, from 1929 to 1936. The present Cabbage Leaf is probably the most known of this series. It depicts a flayed leaf of cabbage on display, in a monumental close-up, lying in a dark background, while highlighting its spinal structure and linear striations, as if it was a sculpture in relief. It is one of many examples of his approach to straight photography at the time, while also showing influence from surrealism. In the early 1930s, by the time he took this picture, he wrote that: “[the] cabbage has renewed my interest, marvellous hearts, like carved ivory, leaves with veins like flames, with forms curved like the most exquisite shell… in the cabbage I sense the entire secret of life’s force.”

== Public collections ==
There are several prints of this photograph, including those preserved at the Art Institute of Chicago, the Museum of Modern Art, New York, the National Museum of American History, Washington, D.C., and the San Francisco Museum of Modern Art.
