= Brett Weston =

American photographer (1911–1993)

- Brett Weston by third wife Dody Weston Thompson, 1949
- Born: Brett Weston; December 16, 1911; Los Angeles, California, U.S.
- Died: January 22, 1993 (aged 81); Hawaii, U.S.
- Education: Assisted Edward Weston (father)
- Known for: Photography
- Notable work: Mendenhall Glacier, Dune Oceano, Tin Roofs, Canal Netherlands, Underwater Nude
- Movement: f64
- Patrons: Edward Weston; Polaroid Corporation's; Artist Support Program

Theodore Brett Weston (December 16, 1911 – January 22, 1993) was an American photographer.

== Life and work ==
He was the second of the four sons of photographer Edward Weston, Flora Chandler and Eoin Taylor. He began taking photographs in 1925, while living in Mexico with Tina Modotti and his father. He began showing his photographs with Edward Weston in 1927, was featured at the international exhibition at Film und Foto in Germany at age 17, and mounted his first one-man museum retrospective at age 21 at the De Young Museum in San Francisco in January, 1932. In 1945, he was awarded a Guggenheim Fellowship in Photography.

Weston's earliest images from the 1920s reflect his intuitive sophisticated sense of abstraction. He often flattened the plane, engaging in layered space, an artistic style more commonly seen among the abstract expressionists and more modern painters like David Hockney than other photographers. He began photographing the dunes at Oceano, California, in the early 1930s. This eventually became a favorite location of his father Edward and later shared with Brett's third wife Dody Weston Thompson. Brett preferred the high gloss papers and ensuing sharp clarity of the gelatin silver photographic materials of the Group f/64 rather than the platinum matte photographic papers common in the 1920s and encouraged Edward Weston to explore the new silver papers in his own work. Brett Weston was credited by photography historian Beaumont Newhall as the first photographer to make negative space the subject of a photograph.

"Brett and I are always seeing the same kinds of things to do - we have the same kind of vision. Brett didn't like this; naturally enough, he felt that even when he had done the thing first, the public would not know and he would be blamed for imitating me." Edward Weston - Daybooks - May 24, 1930.

Brett Weston used to refer to Edward Weston as "my biggest fan" and there was no rivalry between the two photographic giants. Brett and his wife Dody loyally set aside their own photography to help Edward after he was unable to print his own images due to Parkinson's disease, which claimed Edward's life in 1958.

Weston married and divorced four times. He had one daughter, Erica Weston. Brett Weston lived part-time on the Big Island of Hawaii and in Carmel, California, for the final 14 years of his life. He maintained a home in Waikoloa that was built by his brother Neil Weston, and later moved to Hawaii Paradise Park. He died in Kona Hospital on January 22, 1993, after suffering a stroke.

Weston was ranked one of the top ten photographers collected by American museums by the final decade of his life. Van Deren Coke described Weston as the "child genius of American photography."

In November 1996, Oklahoma City collector Christian Keesee acquired from the Brett Weston Estate the remaining body of Weston's work.

== Collections ==
Weston's work is held in the following permanent collections:

- Brett Weston Archive, Oklahoma City Oklahoma
- Carnegie Museum of Art, Pittsburgh, Pennsylvania
- Center for Creative Photography, University of Arizona, Tucson
- Colorado Springs Fine Arts Center: 1 print (as of March 2021)
- Honolulu Museum of Art
- Los Angeles County Museum of Art: 114 prints (as of March 2021)
- Muscarelle Museum of Art, Williamsburg, Virginia
- Museum of Contemporary Art, Los Angeles
- Museum of Contemporary Photography, Columbia College Chicago
- Museum of Modern Art, New York: 94 prints (as of March 2021)
- Oklahoma City Museum of Art
- San Francisco Museum of Modern Art: 43 prints (as of March 2021)
- Tate, UK: 98 prints (as of March 2021)
- The Phillips Collection, Washington, D. C.

== Publications ==
- Brett Weston: Photographs. Merle Armitage, E. Weyhe, NY, 1956. ASIN: B0007DEJP2.
- Voyage of the Eye. Aperture, NY, 1975. ISBN 978-0-912334-84-4.
- Brett Weston: Photographs from Five Decades. Edited by RH Cravens, Aperture, NY, 1980. ISBN 978-0-89381-065-8.
- Brett Weston: A Personal Selection. Photography West Graphics, CA, 1986. ISBN 0-9616515-0-4.
- Brett Weston: Master Photographer. Photography West Graphics, CA, 1989. ISBN 0-9616515-3-9.
- Hawaii: Fifty Photographs. Photography West Graphics, CA, 1992. ISBN 0-9616515-4-7.
- Dune: Edward and Brett Weston. Edited by Kurt Markus. Wild Horse Island Press, MT, 2003. ISBN 0-9677321-2-3.
- San Francisco. Lodima Press, PA 2004. ISBN 978-1-888899-16-0. With an afterword by Roger Aikin.
- White Sands. Lodima Press, PA 2005. ISBN 1-888899-31-X. With an introduction by Nancy Newhall and an afterword by Roger Aikin.
- New York. Lodima Press, PA 2006. ASIN: B000T4CSUM. With an introduction by Beaumont Newhall and an afterword by Roger Aikin.
- Fifteen Photographs. Lodima Press, PA 2007. ASIN: B0012FZNJA. With an afterword by Roger Aikin.
- Brett Weston: Out of the Shadow. Edited by Stephen Bennett Phillips. Oklahoma City Museum of Art, OK, 2008, ISBN 978-0-911919-09-7.
- A Restless Eye: A Biography of Photographer Brett Weston. John Charles Woods, Erica Weston Editions pubs. 2011. ISBN 978-0-615-41361-7.
- Brett Weston At One Hundred - A Centennial Tribute. Edited by Merrilly Alley. Photography West Graphics, CA, 2011. ISBN 978-0-615-53977-5. Edition of 100 copies.
