= Steel: Armco, Middletown, Ohio =

Photograph by Edward Weston

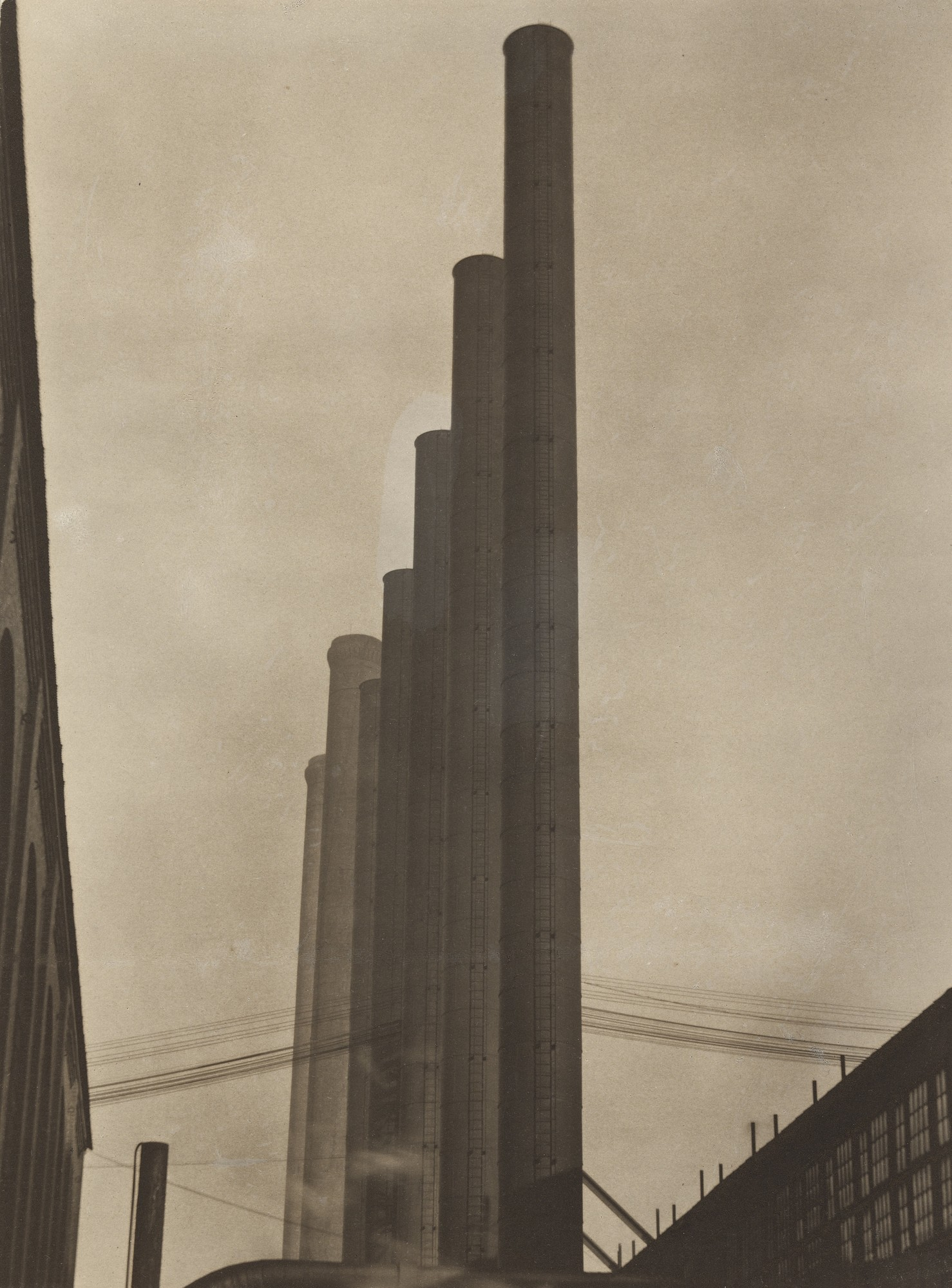
Steel: Armco, Middletown, Ohio (1922) by Edward Weston

Steel: Armco, Middletown, Ohio is a black and white photograph taken by American photographer Edward Weston in 1922.

== History and description ==
Weston wrote on his journals, which he began writing in the fall of 1922 while in a trip to visit his sister Mary Seaman in Ohio, about how the industrial landscape of Armco impressed and inspired him, in particular the “great plant and giant stacks of the American Rolling Mill Company”. He took five or six photographs at the site in October 1922, this being one of the most famous. Weston went to show Alfred Stieglitz some of the pictures that he took in Armco, which impressed him very positively, sensing in it modernist tendencies. These photographs were instrumental in the evolution of Weston's photography from his recent pictorialism work to what would be a more modern approach to this art, through straight photography. Weston was also influenced by his meeting with Austrian architect Rudolph Schindler and by the readings of several avant-garde European art magazines. The series of photographs that he took in Armco were essential in his changing of style. Like he stated: he was "ripe to change, was changing, yes changed."

He brought these set of pictures when he moved to Mexico City, in Mexico, where he lived with Italian photographer and actress Tina Modotti, and they were inspirational for the new work that he would make in that staying. He kept them at his studio, alongside a Japanese print and a Pablo Picasso print. When Weston moved back to the United States, this print remained with Modotti, until her death in 1942.

== Public collections ==
There are prints of the photograph at the Museum of Modern Art, in New York, the George Eastman House, in Rochester, the National Gallery of Canada, in Ottawa, and at the Museo de Arte Moderno, in Mexico City.
