= Frederick Sommer =

Italian-born American photographer (1905–1999)

Frederick Sommer (September 7, 1905 – January 23, 1999), was an artist born in Angri, Italy and raised in Brazil. He earned an M.A. degree in Landscape Architecture (1927) from Cornell University where he met Frances Elisabeth Watson (1904–1999) whom he married in 1928; they had no children. The Sommers moved to Tucson, Arizona in 1931 and then Prescott, Arizona in 1935. Sommer became a naturalized citizen of the United States on November 18, 1939.

Considered a master photographer, Sommer first experimented with photography in 1931 after being diagnosed with tuberculosis the year prior. Early works on paper (starting in 1931) included watercolors, and evolved to pen-and-ink or brush plus drawings of visually composed musical score. Concurrent to the works on paper, Sommer started to seriously explore the artistic possibilities of photography in 1938 when he acquired an 8×10 Century Universal Camera, eventually encompassing the genres of still life (chicken parts and assemblage), horizonless landscapes, jarred subjects, cut-paper, cliché-verre negatives and nudes. According to art critic Robert C. Morgan, Sommer's "most extravagant, subtle, majestic, and impressive photographs—comparable in many ways to the views of Yosemite Valley’s El Capitan and Half Dome by Ansel Adams—were Sommer’s seemingly infinite desert landscapes, some of which he referred to as 'constellations.'" In 1976, the Center for Creative Photography in Tucson obtained a significant collection of his photographs. The last artistic body of work Sommer produced (1989–1999) was collage based largely on anatomical illustrations.

Frederick Sommer had significant artistic relationships with Edward Weston, Max Ernst, Aaron Siskind, Richard Nickel, Minor White, and others. His archive (of negatives and correspondence) was part of founding the Center for Creative Photography in 1975 along with Ansel Adams, Harry Callahan, Wynn Bullock, and Aaron Siskind. He taught briefly at Prescott College during the late 60s and substituted for Harry Callahan at IIT Institute of Design in 1957–1958 and later at the Rhode Island School of Design.

Bruce Silverstein Gallery is the New York representative of the Frederick & Frances Sommer Foundation.

== Drawings in the Manner of Musical Scores ==
In 1934, Frederick Sommer visited Los Angeles. Walking through the art museum one day, he noticed a display of musical scores. He saw them not as music, but as graphics, and found in them an elegance and grace that led him to a careful study of scores and notation.

He found that the best music was visually more effective and attractive. He assumed that there was a correlation between music as we hear it and its notation; and he wondered if drawings that used notational motifs and elements could be played. He made his first “drawings in the manner of musical scores” that year. (After reviewing this text, Fred asked that the author refer to his scores “only” in this way. When the author suggested that it was perhaps too long to be repeated throughout the text, he laughed and said, “Well, use it at least once.”)

Although people knew of his scores, and occasionally brought musicians to his house to play them, no one ever stayed with it for long. In 1967, both Walton Mendelson and Stephen Aldrich attended Prescott College, Prescott, Arizona, where Sommer was on the faculty. They barely knew of his reputation as a photographer, and nothing of the scores. Towards the end of September he invited them to his house for dinner, but they were to come early, and Mendelson was to bring my flute. “Can you play that?” he asked, as they looked at one of the scores, framed, and sitting atop his piano. With no guidance from him, they tried. Nervous and unsure of what they were getting into, they stopped midway through. Mendelson asked Alddrich where he was in the score: he pointed to where Mendelson had stopped. They knew then, mysterious though the scores were, they could be played. On May 9, 1968, the first public performance of the music of Frederick Sommer was given at Prescott College.

Sommer had no musical training. He didn't know one note from another on his piano, nor could he read music. His record collection was surprisingly broad for that time, and his familiarity with it was thorough. What surprised Mendelson and Aldrich when they first met him were his visual skills: he could identify many specific pieces and almost any major composer by looking at the shapes of the notation on a page of printed music.

Of Sommer's known works, his drawings, glue-color on paper, photographs, and writings, it is only these scores that have been a part of his creative life throughout the entirety of his artistic career. He was still drawing elegant scores in 1997. And like his skip reading, they are the closest insight to his creative process, thinking and aesthetic.
