= Ruth Bernhard =

German-born American photographer (1905–2006)

- Born: October 14, 1905; Berlin, German Empire
- Died: December 18, 2006 (aged 101); San Francisco, California, U.S.
- Occupation: Photographer

Ruth Bernhard (October 14, 1905 – December 18, 2006) was a German-born American photographer.

== Early life and education ==
Bernhard was born in Berlin to Lucian Bernhard and Gertrude Hoffmann. Lucian Bernhard was known for his poster and typeface design, many of which bear his name and are still in use. Bernhard's parents divorced when she was 2 years old and she only met her mother twice after the divorce. She was raised by two schoolteacher sisters and their mother. Bernhard's father Lucian was a major proponent of Ruth's work, and advised her frequently.

Bernhard studied art history and typography at the Berlin Academy of Art from 1925 to 1927 before moving to New York City to join her father. She began teaching at the University of California in 1958, while also giving lectures, classes and workshops all over the United States.

== Photography career ==
In 1927 Bernhard moved to New York City, where her father was already living. She worked as an assistant to Ralph Steiner in Delineator magazine, but he terminated her employment for indifferent performance. Using the severance pay, Bernhard bought her own camera equipment. By the late-1920s, while living in Manhattan, Bernhard was heavily involved in the lesbian sub-culture of the artistic community, becoming friends with photographer Berenice Abbott and her lover, critic Elizabeth McCausland. Her first realization that she was attracted to other women occurred on New Year's Eve 1928 when she met the painter Patti Light. She wrote about her "bisexual escapades" in her memoir. In 1934 Bernhard began photographing women in the nude. It would be this art form for which she would eventually become best known. In 1935, she chanced to meet Edward Weston on the beach in Santa Monica. She would later say;

I was unprepared for the experience of seeing his pictures for the first time. It was overwhelming. It was lightning in the darkness ... here before me was indisputable evidence of what I had thought possible—an intensely vital artist whose medium was photography.

— Ruth Bernhard, http://iphf.org/inductees/ruth-bernhard/

Bernhard was so inspired by Weston's work that, after meeting him in 1935, she moved to California (where he lived). In 1939, Bernhard moved back to New York for eight years, during which time she met photographer Alfred Stieglitz.

Bernhard was inspired by the small things in her life. In an interview from 1999 with Photographers Forum, Ruth states," I’m most interested in—the little things that nobody observes, that nobody thinks are of any value". In the same interview she stated that,"Everything is universal" and that she was "very much aware of that". This idea of minimalism drove her passion for photography.

In 1934 Ruth received a commission from the Museum of Modern Art (MoMA) to photograph works for the Machine Art exhibition catalog. Her father Lucian Bernhard set up the meeting with MoMA for her.

== Life on the West Coast ==
By 1944 she had met and became involved with artist and designer Eveline (Evelyn) Phimister. The two moved in together, and remained together for the next ten years in Carmel, California. Here, Bernhard worked with Group f/64. Soon, finding Carmel a difficult place in which to earn a living, they moved to Hollywood where she fashioned a career as a commercial photographer. In 1953, they moved to San Francisco where she became a colleague of photographers such as Ansel Adams, Imogen Cunningham, Minor White, and Wynn Bullock.

Most of Bernhard's work is studio-based, ranging from simple still lifes to complex nudes. In the 1940s she worked with the conchologist Jean Schwengel. She worked almost exclusively in black-and-white, though there are rumours that she had done some color work as well. She also is known for her lesbian themed works, most notably Two Forms (1962). In that work, a black woman and a white woman who were real-life lovers are featured with their nude bodies pressed against one another.

A departure was a collaboration with Melvin Van Peebles (as "Melvin Van"), then a young cable car gripman (driver) in San Francisco. Van Peebles wrote the text and Bernhard took the unposed photographs for The Big Heart, a book about life on the cable cars.

In the early 1980s, Bernhard started to work with Carol Williams, owner of Photography West Gallery in Carmel, California. Bernhard told Williams that she knew there would be a book of her photography after her death, but hoped one could be published during her lifetime. Williams approached New York Graphics Society, and several other photographic book publishers, but was advised that "only Ansel Adams could sell black-and-white photography books." Bernhard and Williams decided to sell five limited edition prints to raise the necessary funds to publish a superior quality book of Ruth Bernhard nudes. The ensuing edition was produced by David Gray Gardner of Gardner Lithograph, (also the printer of Adams's books) and was called The Eternal Body. It won Photography Book of the Year in 1986 from Friends of Photography. This book was often credited by Ruth Bernhard as being an immeasurable help to her future career and public recognition. The Eternal Body was reprinted by Chronicle Books and later as a deluxe limited Centennial Edition in celebration of Ruth Bernhard's 100th birthday in October 2005. Carol Williams credited Ruth Bernhard with encouraging her to venture into book publishing, and later published several other photographic monographs.

In the 1980s Bernhard also started to work with Joe Folberg. Folberg bought Vision Gallery from Douglas Elliott (who founded it in 1979) in San Francisco in 1982. Bernhard and Folberg worked together until Folberg's death. The gallery split with Debra Heimerdinger taking over operations in North America and Folberg's son Neil moving the "Vision Gallery" to Jerusalem.

In 1967, Bernhard began a teaching career. This same year, Bernhard met United States Air Force Colonel Price Rice, an African American man ten years younger than her, and the two became lovers. They would remain together until his death in 1999. In her 90s, Bernhard cooperated with biographer Margaretta K. Mitchell in the book Ruth Bernhard, Between Art and Life, publicly revealing her many affairs with women and men throughout her lifetime.

In 1984 Ruth worked with filmmaker Robert Burrill on her autobiographic film entitled, Illuminations: Ruth Bernhard, Photographer. The film premièred in 1989 at the Kabuki Theater in San Francisco and on local PBS station KQED in 1991.

Bernhard was inducted into the Women's Caucus for Art in 1981. Bernhard was hailed by Ansel Adams as "the greatest photographer of the nude".

Bernhard died in San Francisco at age 101.

== Publications by Bernhard ==
- Bernhard, Ruth. Collecting Light: The Photographs of Ruth Bernhard. Edited by James Alinder. Carmel, Calif.: Friends of Photography, 1979
- Bernhard, Ruth. Gift of the Commonplace. Carmel Valley, Calif.: Woodrose Publications / Center for Photographic Art, 1996. ISBN 0-9630393-5-0
- Bernhard, Ruth. The Eternal Body: A Collection of Fifty Nudes. Carmel, Calif.: Photography West Graphics, 1986. San Francisco: Chronicle, 1994. Essay by Margaretta K. Mitchell. ISBN 0-8118-0801-7 ISBN 0-8118-0826-2
- Van, Melvin, and Ruth Bernhard. The Big Heart. San Francisco: Fearon, 1957.
- Mitchell, Margaretta K., and Ruth Bernhard. Ruth Bernhard: Between Art and Life. San Francisco: Chronicle, 2000. Print.

== Awards ==
- 1976 Dorothea Lange Award by the Oakland Museum
- 1987 Distinguished Career in Photography Award. Society of Photographic Education. Midwest Regional Conference, Chicago, Illinois, November 8, 1987
- 1990 Presidential Citation for Outstanding Service to Utah State University. Logan, Utah, October 25, 1990
- 1994 Cyril Magnin Award for Distinguished Service in Photography. Presented by the San Francisco Chamber of Commerce
- 1996 Lifetime Achievement Award. Women's Caucus for Art. California Regional Chapter, presented at Mills College, Oakland, March 30, 1996
- 1997 Honorary Doctor of Humane Letters. The Academy of Art, San Francisco, June 1, 1997
- 2003 Lucie Awards for achievement in fine art

== Solo exhibitions ==
- 1936: Jake Zeitlin Gallery, Los Angeles
- 1936: Pacific Institute of Music and Art, Los Angeles, Eye Behind the Camera
- 1938: P.M. Gallery, New York
- 1956: Institute for Cultural Relations, Mexico City

1981 - Photography West Gallery, Carmel, CA. Carmel Pine Cone

- 1986: San Francisco Museum of Modern Art The Eternal Body
- 2014: Peter Fetterman Gallery The Eternal Nude

== Collections ==
Bernhard's work is held in the following permanent collections:

- Indianapolis Museum of Art, Indiana
- J. Paul Getty Museum, Los Angeles, California
- Museum of Contemporary Photography at Columbia College Chicago, Illinois
- Museum of Photographic Arts (MOPA), San Diego, California
- Portland Museum of Art, Oregon
- San Jose Museum of Art, California
- Minneapolis Institute of Art
- International Photography Hall of Fame, St.Louis, Missouri

== See also ==
- List of German women artists

== General references ==
- Ruth Bernhard Minnesota Public Radio (audio)
- Samples of Bernhard's works
  - Various photographs at artnet
- Lavender, Lisa Ann. "Ruth Bernhard." In The Oxford Companion to the Photograph, ed. Robin Lenman. Oxford: Oxford University Press, 2005. ISBN 0-19-866271-8
- Rosenblum, Naomi. A History of Women Photographers. New York: Abbeville, 1994. ISBN 1-55859-761-1
- Bernhard, Ruth, and Margaretta K. Mitchell. Ruth Bernhard: Between Art and Life. San Francisco: Chronicle, 2000. ISBN 0-8118-2191-9
- Corinne, Tee A. "Ruth Bernhard." In An Encyclopedia of Gay, Lesbian, Bisexual, Transgender, and Queer Culture. 2002.
- "Ruth Bernhard" at Women in Photography: an unsigned article, with photographs by Bernhard
- Ruth Bernhard, Joe Folberg of meeting Bernhard
- Primary documents regarding her life and career are housed at Princeton University Library's Special Collections Department. An inventory of their holding can be found in this finding aid.
