= Nata Piaskowski =

Polish-American photographer

Nata Piaskowski (1912–2004) was a Polish-American photographer. Known for her fine composition, she took portraits and landscapes as well as series on the San Francisco psychedelic scene and the changing effects of the tide.

== Early life ==
Born in Łódź, Poland, Piaskowski's parents were killed by Nazis in the Warsaw Ghetto. She attended the State Pedagogical Institute from 1930 to 1932, after which she became a schoolteacher. During the late 1930s, she travelled in France, Austria and the eastern United States. From 1939 to 1942, she lived in Switzerland before emigrating to the United States with her husband in 1942. Shortly after their arrival, her husband died.

== Career ==
After meeting a number of photographers and artists during the 1940s in Carmel, California, she obtained United States citizenship in 1948, allowing her to embark on her career while continuing her studies at the California School of Fine Arts where Minor White became a major influence. Her early photographs include images of Edward Weston and Minor White, Imogen Cunningham and the opening of the King Ubu Gallery. She began a close companionship with the painter Martin Baer (1894-1961). In the mid-1950s she joined Bechtel in San Francisco where she worked as a photo librarian and archivist. In addition to further portraiture, she took scenes of urban streets, landscapes and sea views.

After the death of her companion, Baer, she travelled to New York and Chicago as well as to England, France and Italy while embarking on colour photography in 1967, exchanging her large camera for a 35mm Leicaflex. In 1975, she retired from Bechtel. The same year, she put on a solo exhibition at the Focus Gallery in San Francisco titled "Light and Form" which covered shop windows during the psychedelic movement. Subsequent photo trips included Guatemala (1980) and California's Mojave Desert (1981). In 1982, she spent a month photographing the changing landscape at low tide. During the 1980s, she also photographed in New York, Washington D.C., Santa Fe and Taos as well as Death Valley and Yosemite Valley. In 1993, she photographed in Japan.

== Assessment ==
The artist and curator Robert Emory Johnson was impressed by her "magnificent" compositions: "She was very intelligent and very sensitive in her choice of music and poetry and was always encouraging other artists. She was a deep and serious artist throughout her life."

== Exhibitions ==
Piaskowski's photographs are held in numerous collections including those of the San Francisco Museum of Modern Art, the Metropolitan Museum of Art and the National Portrait Gallery. She also exhibited widely, including two solo exhibitions:

- 1989: "The Eye That Shapes", retrospective, Art Museum, Princeton University.
- 1994: "Grasses", black-and-white photography, 871 Fine Arts Gallery, San Francisco

== Later years ==
Piaskowsky died in 2004 in San Francisco at the Jewish Home for the Aged.
