= Wynn Bullock =

American photographer (1902-1975)

- Born: April 18, 1902; Chicago, Illinois, U.S.
- Died: November 16, 1975 (aged 73); Monterey, California, U.S.
- Education: Graduate of the Art Center School, Los Angeles. Attended Columbia University and University of West Virginia.
- Known for: Photographer
- Spouse(s): Mary Elizabeth McCarty (m. 1925–1941); Edna Jeanette Earle (m. 1943–1975)
- Website: www.wynnbullockphotography.com

Wynn Bullock (April 18, 1902 – November 16, 1975) was an American photographer whose work is included in over 90 major museum collections around the world. He received substantial critical acclaim during his lifetime, published numerous books and is mentioned in all the standard histories of modern photography.

== Life and career ==
=== Early career in music ===
Bullock was born in Chicago and raised in South Pasadena, California. As a boy, his passions were singing and athletics (football, baseball, swimming and tennis). After high school graduation, he moved to New York to pursue a musical career and was hired as a chorus member in Irving Berlin’s Music Box Revue. He occasionally sang the primary tenor role when headliner John Steele was unable to appear and then was given a major role with the Music Box Review Road Company. During the mid-1920s, he furthered his career in Europe, studying voice and giving concerts in France, Germany and Italy.

While living in Paris, Bullock became fascinated with the work of the Impressionists and post-Impressionists. He then discovered the work of Man Ray and László Moholy-Nagy and experienced an immediate affinity with photography, not only as an art form uniquely based on light, but also as a vehicle through which he could more creatively engage with the world. He bought his first camera and began taking pictures.

=== Return to the United States ===
During the Great Depression of the early 1930s, Bullock stopped his European travels and settled in West Virginia to manage his first wife's family business interests. He stopped singing professionally, completed some pre-law courses at the state university, and continued to take photographs as a hobby. In 1938, he moved his family back to Los Angeles and enrolled in law school at the University of Southern California where his mother Georgia Bullock (California's first woman jurist) had studied law. Completely dissatisfied after a few weeks, he left USC and became a student of photography at the nearby Art Center School.

From 1938 to 1940, Bullock became deeply involved in exploring alternative processes such as solarization and bas relief. After graduation from Art Center, his experimental work was exhibited in one of L.A. County Museum's early solo photographic exhibitions. During the early 40s, he worked as a commercial photographer and then enlisted in the Army. Released from the military to photograph for the aircraft industry, he was first employed at Lockheed and then headed the photographic department of Connors-Joyce until the end of the war.

Remarried, and with a new daughter, Bullock traveled throughout California from 1945 to 1946, producing and selling postcard pictures while co-owning a commercial photographic business in Santa Maria. He also worked on developing a way to control the line effect of solarization for which he later was awarded two patents. In 1946, he settled with his family in Monterey, where he had obtained the photographic concession at the Fort Ord military base. He left the concession in 1959, but continued commercial free-lance work until 1968.

=== Bullock and Weston ===
A major turning point in Bullock's life as a creative photographer occurred in 1948, when he met Edward Weston. Inspired by the power and beauty of Weston's prints, he began to explore "straight photography" for himself. Throughout the decade of the 1950s, he devoted himself to developing his own vision, establishing deep, direct connections with nature. A lifelong learner, he also read widely in the areas of physics, general semantics, philosophy, psychology, eastern religion and art. Studying the work of such people as Albert Einstein, Korzybski, Alfred North Whitehead, Bertrand Russell, LaoTzu and Klee, he kept evolving his own dynamic system of principles and concepts that both reflected and nurtured his creative journey.

=== The Family of Man ===
In the mid-1950s, Bullock's artistry came into the public spotlight when Edward Steichen chose two of his photographs to include in the 1955 The Family of Man exhibition at the Museum of Modern Art. At the Corcoran Gallery in Washington, DC, his photograph "Let There Be Light," was voted the most popular of the show. The second, "Child in Forest," became one of the exhibition's most memorable images. By the end of that decade, his work was being featured in many exhibitions and publications worldwide.

=== Color Light Abstractions ===
During the early 60s, Bullock departed from black-and-white imagery and produced a major body of work that he referred to as "Color Light Abstractions". For him, these photographs represented an in-depth exploration of light, manifesting his belief that light is a great force at the heart of all being, "perhaps," as he said, "the most profound truth in the universe."

Although he was tremendously excited about this work, it proved to be ahead of its time in terms of available resources to reproduce it, and it remained largely unknown for almost 50 years. In 2008, the family estate started making high-resolution scans of his original 35 mm Kodachrome slides, producing archivally stable prints, and exhibiting and publishing the imagery.

=== Philosophical explorations late in life ===
In the mid-1960s, frustrated by the limitations of color printing technology, Bullock returned to making black-and-white photographs, continuing to expand his vision to create innovative images that reflected his philosophical nature. Differentiating what he termed "reality", the visible and the known, from "existence", the underlying truth of things, he was ceaseless in his attempts to expand his own faculties of perception and understanding so he could come ever closer in his experiences to the essence of things. Finding the means to more fully evoke that essence was also a key part of his quest. Although he included several different alternative processes (extremely long time exposures, multiple images, up-side-down and negative printing) in his repertoire of techniques, each was always used in the service of symbolizing new ways of relating to and knowing the world. He wrote,

"Searching is everything – going beyond what you know. And the test of the search is really in the things themselves, the things you seek to understand. What is important is not what you think about them, but how they enlarge you."

In the early 70s, Bullock started on a new leg of his creative journey, one that he found completely absorbing and deeply satisfying but which was cut short by incurable cancer. Many of his photographs from that period reveal light emanating from within the heart of things, life glowing and pulsing with energy and vitality. Other photographs are of natural forms that depict or suggest universal human qualities, humanity "deeply embedded in" and re-united with nature.

Throughout his career, Bullock was an active lecturer, workshop leader and teacher, giving of himself to fellow seekers. As a master photographer, Bullock was one of five artists whose archives established the University of Arizona’s Center for Creative Photography. His work may also be found in the permanent collections of over 90 major institutions throughout the world as well as in numerous publications.

== Background ==
=== Family ===
Bullock married Mary Elizabeth McCarty in 1925; the marriage ended in divorce, in 1941. They had two children: Mary Wynne (Mimi) (1930 ) and George (1935–1942). He married Edna Jeanette Earle in 1943 and they had two daughters: Barbara Ann (1945 ) and Lynne Marie (1953 ). Mimi, Edna, Barbara and Lynne each appear in images made during the 1950s. A year after Bullock died in 1975, Edna took up photography and enjoyed a twenty-year career as an artist before she died in 1997. Barbara formed collaborative relationships with both her parents during their lifetimes and has written extensively on their work.

=== Education ===
Bullock took courses at Columbia University, 1925, and University of West Virginia, mid-1930s; attended and graduated from Art Center School in Los Angeles, 1938-1940. He was a lifelong student of philosophy, physics, general semantics, psychology, theology, spirituality and art.

=== Influences ===
Impressionist and post-Impressionist paintings stimulated Bullock’s initial interest in the visual arts. The photographs of Man Ray and László Moholy-Nagy influenced his early experimental work as did Art Center School professor, Edward Kaminski. Although Bullock enjoyed close associations with Edward Weston, Imogen Cunningham, Ansel Adams, Ruth Bernhard and other prominent west coast photographers, he said,

"Theoretical scientists who probe the secrets of the universe and philosophers who seek answers to existence, as well as painters such as Paul Klee who find the thoughts of men of science compatible with art, influence me far more than most photographers."

=== Noteworthy accomplishments ===
Bullock obtained patents in the U.S., Canada, and Great Britain for a "Photographic Process for Producing Line Image" in the late 1940s. He was granted a second U.S. patent on the "Methods and Means for Matching Opposing Densities in Photographic Film" in the early 1950s. In 1957, he was honored with a medal from the Salon of International Photography and, throughout the 1960s, he received several awards from various professional photographic organizations. In 1968, Bullock became a trustee and chairman of the exhibition committee during the formative years of Friends of Photography in Carmel, California.

Along with Ansel Adams, Harry Callahan, Aaron Siskind and Frederick Sommer, he became part of the founding group of photographers whose archives established the Center for Creative Photography at the University of Arizona in 1975. Bullock taught advanced photography courses at the Institute of Design in Chicago during Aaron Siskind's sabbatical and at San Francisco State College at the invitation of John Gutmann. He was a guest instructor for the Ansel Adams Yosemite Workshops. Throughout the 1960s and early 1970s, he lectured widely, led photographic workshops, and participated in many seminars and symposia on various topics and issues in photography.

== Quotes by Bullock ==
- I didn't want to tell the tree or weed what it was. I wanted it to tell me something and through me express its meaning in nature.
- Light to me is perhaps the most profound truth in the universe. My thinking has been deeply affected by the belief everything is some form of radiant energy.
- I love the medium of photography, for with its unique realism it gives me the power to go beyond conventional ways of seeing and understanding and say, "This is real, too."
- I feel all things as dynamic events, being, changing, and interacting with each other in space and time even as I photograph them.
- As sounds in a musical composition can be used not to express physical objects but ideas, emotions, harmonies, rhythmic orders and most any expression of the human mind and spirit, so light can be used visually to express the mind and spirit.
- Light used in its own right, as in light pictures, gives to photography the wonderful plasticity that paint gives to painting without loss of the unmatched reality of straight photography.
- What you see is real - but only on the particular level to which you've developed your sense of seeing. You can expand your reality by developing new ways of perceiving.
- Mysteries lie all around us, even in the most familiar things, waiting only to be perceived.
