= Clarence John Laughlin =

American photographer (1905–1985)

Clarence John Laughlin (1905 – January 2, 1985) was an American photographer best known for his surrealist photographs of the American South.

== Biography ==
=== Early life ===
Laughlin was born into a middle-class family in Lake Charles, Louisiana. His rocky childhood, southern heritage, and interest in literature influenced his work greatly. After losing everything in a failed rice-growing venture in 1910, his family was forced to relocate to New Orleans where Laughlin's father found work in a factory. Laughlin was an introverted child with few friends and a close relationship with his father, who cultivated and encouraged his lifelong love of literature and whose death in 1918 devastated his son.

Although he dropped out of high school in 1920 after having barely completed his first year, Laughlin was an educated and highly literate man. His large vocabulary and love of language are evident in the elaborate captions he later wrote to accompany his photographs. He initially aspired to be a writer and wrote many poems and stories in the style of French symbolism, most of which remained unpublished.

=== Photography career ===
Laughlin discovered photography when he was 25 and taught himself how to use a simple 2½ by 2¼ view camera. He began working as a freelance architectural photographer and was subsequently employed by agencies as varied as Vogue magazine and the US government. Disliking the constraints of government work, Laughlin eventually left Vogue after a conflict with then-editor Edward Steichen. Thereafter, he worked almost exclusively on personal projects utilizing a wide range of photographic styles and techniques, from simple geometric abstractions of architectural features to elaborately staged allegories utilizing models, costumes, and props. Through this period one of his favorite models was Dody Weston Thompson who went on to become a notable photographer in her own right.

Laughlin's personal projects and large collection of images focused mostly on places and the architecture located there. His most well known works focus on New Orleans, but he also photographed in Chicago, Salt Lake City, Los Angeles, San Francisco, St. Louis, San Antonio, and Little Rock. With the photobook being the ultimate goal and measure for success for photographers, Laughlin achieved this in 1948 when Ghosts Along the Mississippi: The Magic of the Old Houses of Louisiana was first published. The book features 100 black and white images of photographs that are focused around the architecture of the south during the plantation era. Through this book, Laughlin was interested in representing the lengthy history of Louisiana and the feeling of life there, while also recognizing the history of slavery as well as the imaginary situations that he created.

=== Death ===
He died on January 2, 1985, in New Orleans, leaving behind a massive collection of books and images. Thanks to the 17,000 negatives that he preserved, his work continues to be shown around the United States and Europe. Laughlin's library, comprising over 30,000 volumes, was purchased by Louisiana State University in 1986. The collection's focus in on science fiction, fantasy, mystery and the macabre. Other subjects represented include 20th-century art and design, European and American architecture, photography, Victoriana, humor, sex and sexuality, psychology, spiritualism, and the occult.

Laughlin is buried in Paris's Père Lachaise Cemetery in grave 18223.

== Legacy ==
Many historians credit Laughlin as being the first true surrealist photographer in the United States. His images are often nostalgic, reflecting the influence of Eugène Atget and other photographers who tried to capture vanishing urban landscapes.

A pair of surrealistic photographs of parts on a 1939 Ford, in which the photographer's reflection as he took the pictures could be seen, were showcased in 2013 on an episode of Antiques Roadshow set in Baton Rouge, Louisiana, and attributed to Clarence John Laughlin. The man who brought the photographs to the Roadshow knew Laughlin's son, and saw the photos hanging at the son's place of business. In order to acquire them, the man traded automobile repairs and various parts, first for one, then for the other. Their retail value, as a pair, was appraised at $7,000 to $9,000, although the owner indicated that he thought they were priceless.
