= Center for Creative Photography =

Photography archive in Tucson, Arizona

- Exterior of the center
- Coordinates: 32°14′06″N 110°57′17″W
- Website: ccp.arizona.edu

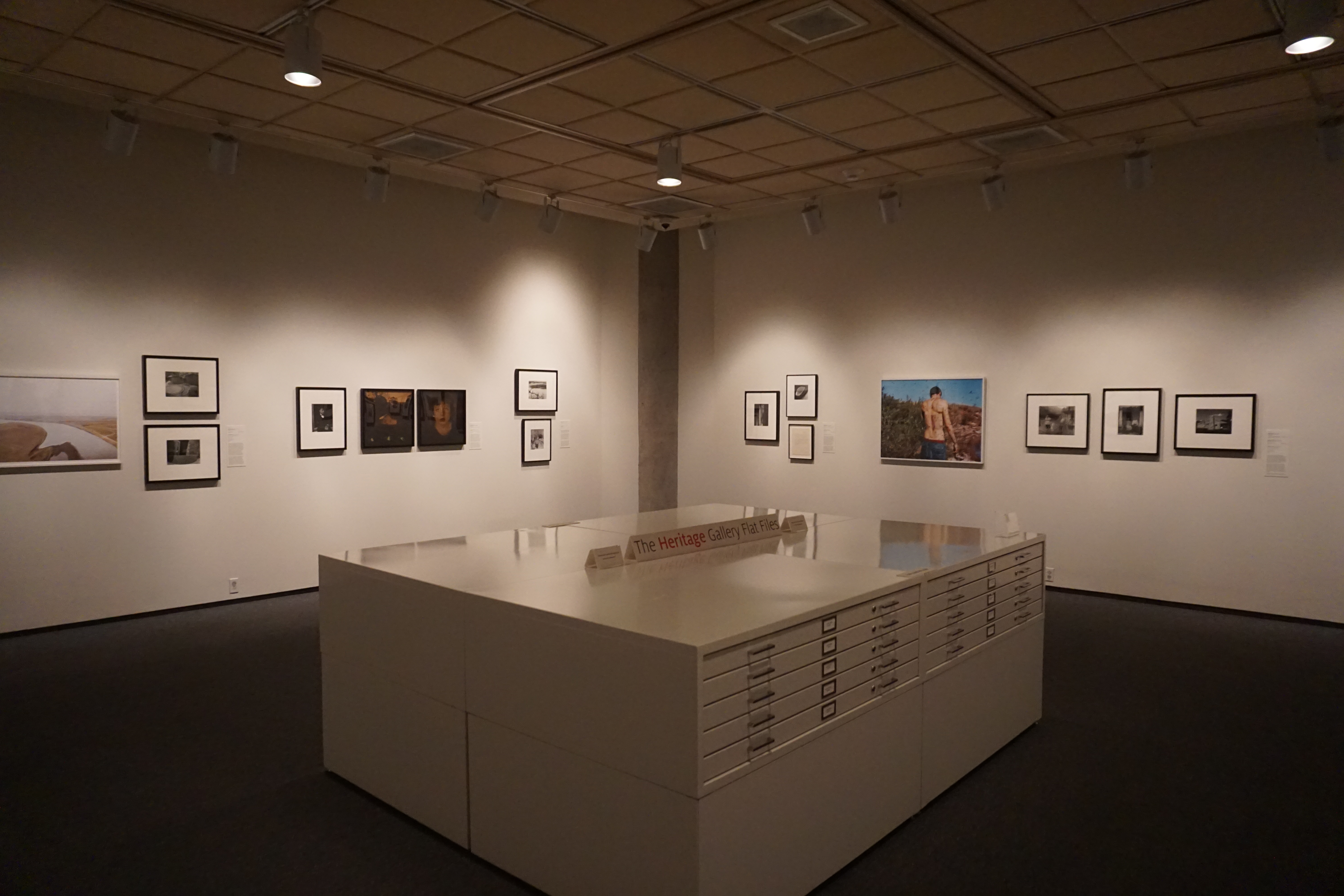
Interior of the center

The Center for Creative Photography (CCP), established in 1975 and located on the University of Arizona's Tucson campus, is a research facility and archival repository containing the full archives of over sixty of the most famous American photographers including those of Edward Weston, Harry Callahan and Garry Winogrand, as well as a collection of over 80,000 images representing more than 2,000 photographers. The center also houses the archives for Ansel Adams, including all negatives known to exist at the time of his death. The CCP collects, preserves, interprets, and makes available materials that are essential to understanding photography and its history.

== Details ==
Ansel Adams was among the founders of the center. In 1989, the CCP relocated to its current 55,000-square-foot (5,100 m^{2}) location, which is part of the university's Fine Arts Complex.

The CCP is dedicated to photography as an art form. Among the photographers represented in the center's art collection are Lola Alvarez Bravo, Richard Avedon, Josef Breitenbach, Wynn Bullock, Louise Dahl-Wolfe, Andreas Feininger, Oliver Gagliani, John Humble, R. J. Kern, Margrethe Mather, Ray McSavaney, William Mortensen, Marion Palfi, Aaron Siskind, W. Eugene Smith, Rosalind Solomon, Frederick Sommer, Peter Stackpole, Edward Steichen, Paul Strand, Tseng Kwong Chi, Laura Volkerding, Willard Van Dyke, Bill Jay, and Ylla.

The gallery at the CCP is open to the public and features an ever-changing exhibit. A portion of CCP's collections is available online via CCP's official website.

Beyond the exhibition program, the CCP also offers educational programs, research assistance, a museum store, and fellowships and internships (open to University of Arizona students). In addition, licensing and reproduction services are available for educators, museums, scholars, and publishers.

The CCP features a 240-seat lecture hall with full audiovisual capabilities and is used for various classes in the College of Fine Arts.
