= Nancy Newhall =

American photography critic (1908–1974)

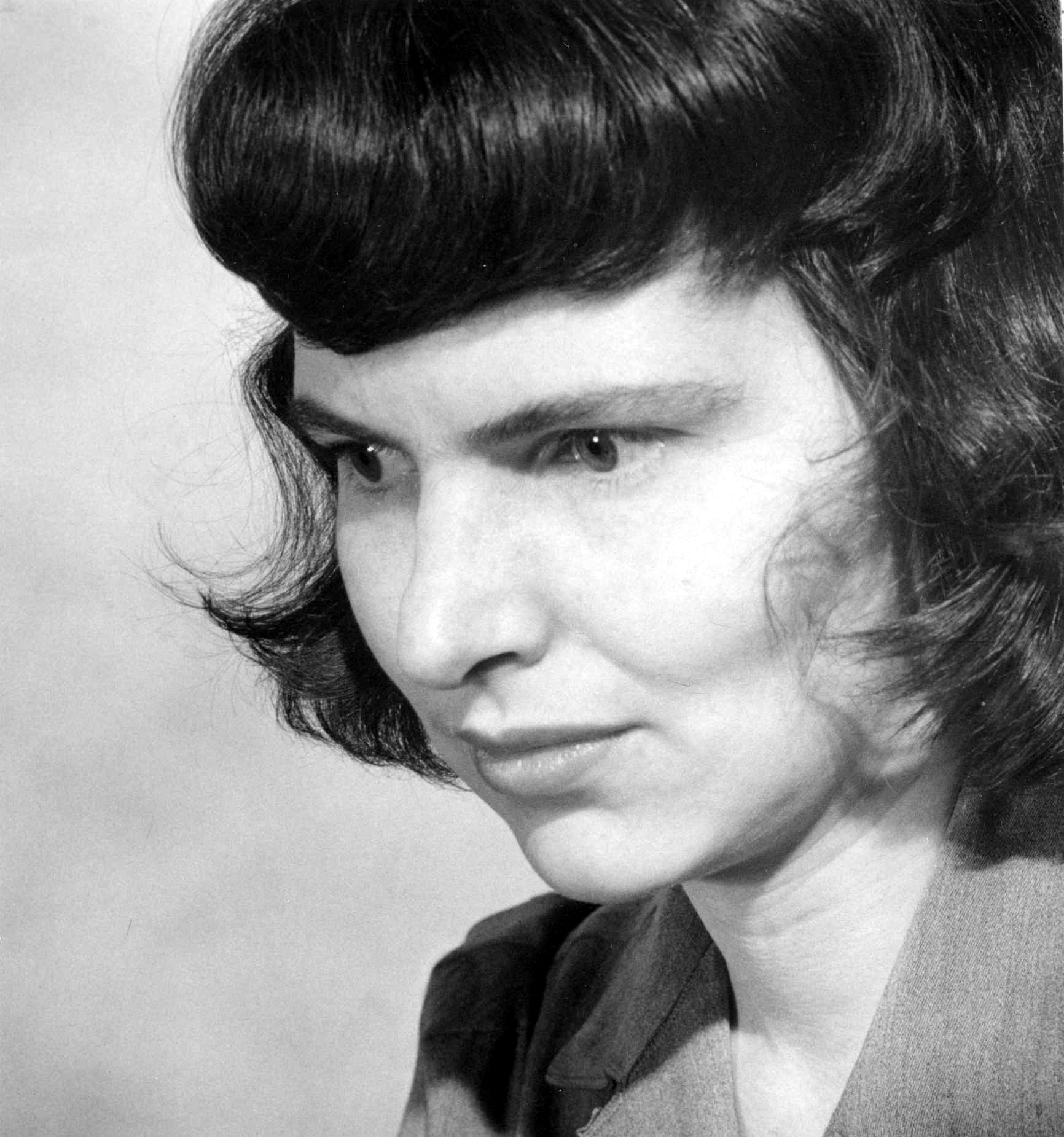
- Nancy Newhall 1942, photo by Barbara Morgan.
- Born: Nancy Wynne; May 9, 1908; Lynn, Massachusetts, U.S.
- Died: July 7, 1974 (aged 66); Jackson Hole, Wyoming, U.S.
- Occupations: Art critic, museum professional
- Known for: fine art photography

Nancy Wynne Newhall (May 9, 1908 – July 7, 1974) was an American photography critic. She is best known for writing the text to accompany photographs by Ansel Adams and Edward Weston, but was also a widely published writer on photography, conservation, and American culture.

== Biography ==
Newhall was born Nancy Wynne in Lynn, Massachusetts, and attended Smith College in that state. She married Beaumont Newhall, the curator of photography at the Museum of Modern Art in New York City, and substituted for him in that role during his military service in World War II. During the 1940s she wrote essays on popular art and culture for small magazines and journals, in which she called for a society more attuned to art, and particularly to visual art. Newhall was always more interested in a popular audience than an academic one; in a 1940 essay, she explores the possibilities of the new medium of television for popularizing the visual arts, suggesting techniques for teaching art and photography on camera:

... the cameras should approach an object as an actual spectator does, and, like him, be influenced by empathy. Long shots become closeups, the flow of compositional directions, and, with due care for the results on the screen, studies of detail and texture under dramatic lighting, are all ways of lending motion to motionless things.

In another, she argues for the centrality of photography for understanding and teaching American history ("Research"). Newhall became close to photographer Edward Weston during this period, championing his early work and regarding his controversial 1940s work, which juxtaposed still lifes and nudes of considerable beauty and delicacy with wartime items such as gas masks, with some anxiety.

In 1945, Newhall wrote the text for a book of photographs, Time in New England, by Paul Strand. The work would begin a new phase for her career, in which she became a vocal proponent and a central pioneer of the genre of oversized photography collections. The best known and most influential of these is This Is the American Earth, a collaboration with Ansel Adams, published in 1960. Like Adams, Newhall was involved with the Sierra Club, and wrote often about issues of conservation. Newhall was sometimes accused of political heavy-handedness on that subject—one uncharitable review of American Earth calls her prose "so full of Message that there is no room for poetry" (Deevey)—but her explication of the political context and motivation of Adams' work has been important for the Sierra Club and the conservation movement in general.

Nancy and Beaumont spent three summers at Black Mountain College beginning in 1946. In addition to lecturing and teaching, the Newhalls photographed the college campus and its people, taking portraits of Leo Amino, Ilya Bolotowsky, Gwendolyn Knight, Jacob Lawrence, and Buckminster Fuller's venetian-blind experiment. Some of Nancy and Beaumont Newhall's work is archived at the Center for Creative Photography at the University of Arizona in Tucson, Arizona, and at the Getty Research Institute in Los Angeles, California. Nancy Newhall's photography has been the subject of an exhibition in its own right.

In 1948, Newhall brought together women photographers in New York to plan an exhibition of their work. Participants included Margaret Bourke-White, Barbara Morgan, Lisette Model, Helen Levitt, and Lotte Jacobi. The exhibition plans were abandoned when funding failed to materialize.

She died on July 7, 1974, at St. Johns Hospital in Jackson Hole, Wyoming, from injuries received in an accident which occurred on the Snake River of Grand Teton National Park.

== Major books ==
- Photographs, 1915-1945: Paul Strand. New York: The Museum of Modern Art, 1945.
- The Photographs of Edward Weston. Edward Weston and Nancy Newhall, Museum of Modern Art, NY 1946.
- Time in New England: Photographs by Paul Strand. New York: Aperture, 1950. Reprinted New York: Harper and Row, 1980.
- A Contribution to the Heritage of Every American: The Conservation Activities of John D. Rockefeller, Jr. New York: Knopf, 1957.
- (with Beaumont Newhall) Masters of Photography. New York: Braziller, 1958.
- (with Ansel Adams)This Is the American Earth. San Francisco: Sierra Club Books, 1960.
- Words of the Earth, photographs by Cedric Wright. Sierra Club Books, 1960
- Alvin Langdon Coburn: A Portfolio of Sixteen Photographs. Rochester: George Eastman House, 1963.
- Edward Weston, Photographer: The Flame of Recognition: His Photographs, Accompanied by Excerpts from the Daybooks & Letters, Edward Weston and Nancy Newhall, Published by Aperture, Inc. NY, 1968.
- The Daybooks of Edward Weston, by Edward Weston, edited by Nancy Newhall, v. 1. Mexico.--v. 2. California, Millerton, N.Y., Aperture, 1973.
- Ansel Adams. Sierra Club, 1964. Reprinted (with photographs) as Ansel Adams: The Eloquent Light. New York: Aperture, 1980.
- (with Beaumont Newhall) T. H. O’Sullivan: Photographer. Eastman, 1966.
- (with Ansel Adams)Fiat Lux: The University of California. New York: McGraw Hill, 1967.
- P. H. Emerson: The Fight for Photography as a Fine Art. Aperture, 1975.

== Sources ==
- Deevey, Edward S. Review of This is the American Earth. Science, Vol. 132, No. 3441 (1960), 1759.
- Fuller, Patricia G. (March 1975). "Nancy Newhall (1908-1974)" (PDF). Image. 18 (1). Rochester, N.Y.: International Museum of Photography at George Eastman House Inc.: 1–5. Archived from the original (PDF) on 2012-10-22.
- Klochko, Deborah, Merry Foresta, MaLin Wilson, et al. Nancy Newhall: A Literacy of Images, San Diego, Calif.: Museum of Photographic Arts, 2008.
- Newhall, Nancy. "The Need for Research in Photography." College Art Journal, Vol. 4, No. 4 (1945), 203-206.
- —. "Television and the Arts." Parnassus, Vol. 12, No. 1 (1940), 37-38.
- Sternberger, Paul. "Reflections on Edward Weston's 'Civilian Defense.'" American Art, Vol. 17, No. 1 (2003), 48-67.
