= Minor White =

American photographer, theoretician, critic, and educator

- Born: July 9, 1908; Minneapolis, Minnesota
- Died: June 24, 1976 (aged 67); Boston, Massachusetts
- Education: University of Minnesota
- Known for: Photography

Minor Martin White (July 9, 1908 – June 24, 1976) was an American photographer, theoretician, critic, and educator.

White made photographs of landscapes, people, and abstract subject matter. They showed technical mastery and a strong sense of light and shadow. He taught at the California School of Fine Arts, the Rochester Institute of Technology, and the Massachusetts Institute of Technology, and in his home. Some of his most compelling images are figure studies of men he taught or with whom he had relationships. He helped start the photography magazine Aperture, considered the only periodical produced for, and by, photographers practicing the medium as a fine art. He served as its editor for many years. White was hailed as one of America's greatest photographers.

== Biography ==
=== Early life: 1908–1937 ===
White was born in Minneapolis, Minnesota. He was the only child of Charles Henry White, a bookkeeper, and Florence May Martin White, a dressmaker. His first name was the same as his paternal great, great-grandfather. His middle name was his mother's maiden name.

During his early years, he spent a great deal of his time with his maternal grandparents and enjoyed playing in their large garden, later influencing his decision to study botany in college. His grandfather, George Martin, an amateur photographer, gave White his first camera in 1915. From 1916 to 1922, White's parents went through a series of separations. During those periods, White and his mother lived with her parents. His parents reconciled in 1922, remaining together until they finally divorced in 1929.

When White graduated from high school, he was aware of his latent homosexuality. In 1927, he wrote about his feelings for men in his diary, which his parents read without his permission. After this, he left home for the summer in what he called a brief crisis period. In the fall, he returned home and entered the University of Minnesota, majoring in botany. His parents never spoke of his homosexuality again.

By 1931, when he should have graduated, he did not meet the requirements for a science degree and left school for a year. During this time, he became very interested in writing and started a life-long personal journal he called "Memorable Fancies." He journaled poems, intimate thoughts about his life and sexuality struggles, excerpts from letters he wrote others, occasional diary-like entries about daily life, and later, extensive notes about his photography. He continued with the journal until 1970, when most of his energy was directed to teaching.

In 1932, White re-entered the university, studied botany and writing, and graduated in 1934. The next semester, he took some graduate botany classes. After six months, he decided he lacked the interest to become botanist. He spent the next two years doing odd jobs and exploring his writing skills. During this time, he created a set of 100 sonnets on the theme of sexual love, his first attempt at grouping his creative output.

=== Launching a career: 1937–1945 ===
In late 1937, White decided to move to Seattle. He purchased a 35mm Argus camera and hopped a bus to his intended destination. After stopping in Portland, Oregon, he decided to stay there. For the next two and a half years, he lived at the Portland YMCA and explored photography in depth. He taught his first photography class at the YMCA to a small group of young adults. He also joined the Oregon Camera Club and learned how photographers discuss their craft and work.

In 1938, White was offered a job as photographer for the Oregon Art Project, funded by the Works Progress Administration. One assignment was to photograph historic buildings in downtown Portland before they were demolished for a new riverfront development. These included Arches of the Dodd Building, which featured a young male prostitute standing in the shadow of the building and pointing at his crotch. During the same period, he took publicity photos for the Portland Civic Theater, documenting their plays and taking portraits of the actors and actresses.

In 1940, White was hired to teach photography at the La Grande Art Center in eastern Oregon. He quickly became immersed in his work, taught classes three days a week, lectured on art to local students, reviewed exhibitions for the local newspaper, and delivered a weekly radio broadcast about activities at the Art Center. In his spare time, he traveled throughout the region taking photographs of the landscape, farms, and small town buildings. He also wrote his first article on photography, "When is Photography Creative?," published two years later in American Photography magazine.

White resigned from the Art Center in late 1941 and returned to Portland, intending to start a commercial photography business. That year, the Museum of Modern Art in New York accepted three of his photographs for inclusion in its "Image of Freedom" exhibition. At the exhibition’s close, the museum purchased all three prints, marking the first time his images entered a public collection. The following year the Portland Art Museum gave White his first one-man show, exhibiting four series of photos he took in eastern Oregon. He wrote in his journal that, with that show, "a period came to a close."

In April 1942, White was drafted into the United States Army and hid his homosexuality. Before departing Portland, he left most of his negatives of historic Portland buildings with the Oregon Historical Society. White spent the first two years of World War II in Hawaii and in Australia. Later, he became Chief of the Divisional Intelligence Branch in the southern Philippines. He rarely photographed during this time, choosing to write poetry and extended verse. Three of his longer poems, "Elegies," "Free Verse for the Freedom of Speech," and "Minor Testament," addressed his war experiences and the bonds of men under extreme conditions. Later, he used text from "Minor Testament" in his photographic sequence Amputations. During the war, White became interested in Catholicism, converting on Easter of 1943.

After the war, White traveled to New York City and enrolled in Columbia University. While in New York, he met and became close friends with Beaumont and Nancy Newhall, who worked in the newly formed photography department at the Museum of Modern Art. Through them, White was offered a job as a museum photographer. He spent many hours talking with Nancy Newhall, who he said educated him and strongly influenced his thinking and direction in photography.

=== Mid-career: 1946–1964 ===
In February 1946, White had the first of several meetings with photographer Alfred Stieglitz in New York. White had read Stieglitz's various writings on photography and understood some of his theories. Through their conversations, White came to adopt Stieglitz's theory of equivalence, where the image represents something other than the subject matter, and his use of sequencing pictorial imagery. White wrote in his journal that he expressed his doubt that he was ready to become a serious photographer at one of their meetings. Stieglitz asked him, “Have you ever been in love?" White answered, “Yes.” Stieglitz replied, "Then you can photograph."

During this time, White met and became friends with some of the major photographers of the time, including Berenice Abbott, Edward Steichen, Paul Strand, Edward Weston, and Harry Callahan. Steichen, who was director of the Museum of Modern Art’s photography department, offered White a curatorial position. Instead, White accepted Ansel Adams’s offer to assist him at the newly created photography department at the California School of Fine Arts (CSFA) in San Francisco. White moved to San Francisco in July, living in the same house as Adams for several years. Adams taught White his Zone System method of exposing and developing negatives, which White used extensively in his work. He wrote extensively about it, published a book and taught the exposure and development method as well as the practice of (pre)-visualization to his students.

While in San Francisco, White became close friends with Edward Weston in Carmel. For the remainder of his life, Weston had a profound influence on White's photography and philosophy. Later he said "...Stieglitz, Weston and Ansel all gave me exactly what I needed at that time. I took one thing from each: technique from Ansel, the love of nature from Weston, and from Stieglitz the affirmation that I was alive and I could photograph." Over the next several years, White spent a great deal of time photographing at Point Lobos, the site of some of Weston's most famous images, approaching many of the same subjects with entirely different viewpoints and creative purposes.

By mid-1947, White was the primary teacher at CSFA and had developed a three-year course that emphasized personal expressive photography. Over the next six years, he enlisted some of the best photographers of the time as teachers, including Imogen Cunningham, Lisette Model, and Dorothea Lange. During this time, White created his first grouping of photos and text in a non-narrative form, a sequence he called Amputations. Although it was scheduled to be shown at the California Palace of the Legion of Honor, the exhibition was canceled because White refused to allow the photographs to be shown without text, which included some wording that expressed his ambiguity about America's post-war patriotism.

From The Temptation of St. Anthony Is Mirrors (1948)

The next three years were some of White's most creatively prolific. In addition to taking dozens of land- and waterscapes, he took dozens of photographs that evolved into some of his most compelling sequences. Three in particular showed his continuing struggles with his sexuality. Song Without Words, The Temptation of St. Anthony Is Mirrors, and Fifth Sequence/Portrait of a Young Man as Actor all depict "the emotional turmoil he feels over his love and desire for men."

In 1949, White purchased a small Zeiss Ikonta camera and began a series of urban street photographs. Over the next four years, he took nearly 6,000 images, all inspired by his newfound interest in the poetry of Walt Whitman. The project, which he called City of Surf, included photographs of San Francisco's Chinatown, the docks, people on the streets, and various parades and fairs around town.

The period of 1951–52 is one of the formative times in White's career. He participated in a Conference on Photography at the Aspen Institute, where the idea of creating a new journal of photography was discussed by Ansel Adams, Dorothea Lange, Beaumont and Nancy Newhall, Frederick Sommer and others. Soon after, Aperture magazine was founded by many of these same individuals. White volunteered for and was approved as editor, and the first issue appeared in April 1952. Aperture quickly became one of the most influential magazines about photography, and White remained as editor until 1975.

Near the end of 1952, White's father, from whom he had been estranged for many years, died in Long Beach, California. In 1953, Walter Chappell introduced White to the I Ching, an ancient Chinese book of philosophy and divination. White continued to be influenced by and refer to this text throughout the rest of his life. He was especially intrigued by the concepts of yin and yang, in which apparently opposite or contrary forces may be conceived as complementary. Later that same year, a reorganization at CSFS resulted in a reduction in White's classroom time, and he began to think about an employment change. Concurrently, Beaumont Newhall recently had become the curator at the George Eastman House in Rochester, New York. He invited White to work with him as a curatorial assistant. He exhibited September 28 – November 3, 1954, at Limelight Gallery in New York and was included in that gallery's Great Photographs at the end of that year. Over the next three years White organized three themed exhibitions that demonstrated his particular interests: Camera Consciousness, The Pictorial Image and Lyrical and Accurate. In 1955 he joined the faculty at the Rochester Institute of Technology (RIT), where he taught one day a week.

White's photographic output declined during this time due to his teaching and editorial work, but he continued to produce enough images that by the end of 1955 he had created a new sequence, Sequence 10/Rural Cathedrals, which included landscape images from upstate New York that were shot on regular and infrared film. By 1955 White was fully engaged in teaching, having been appointed as instructor at the new four-year photography program at RIT as well as conducting classes and workshops at Ohio University and Indiana University. Walter Chappell moved to Rochester later in the year to work at the George Eastman House. Chappell engaged White in long discussions about various Eastern religions and philosophies. White began practicing Zen meditation and adopted a Japanese style of decoration in his house. Over the next two years the discussions between White and Chappell metamorphosed into lengthy discourses about the writing and philosophy of George Gurdjieff. White gradually became an adherent of Gurdjieff's teachings and started to incorporate Gurdjieff's thinking into the design and implementation of his workshops. Gurdjieff's concepts, for White, were not just intellectual exercises but guides to experience, and they greatly influenced much of his approach to teaching and photography throughout the rest of his life.

During this same period White began making his first color images. Although he is better known for his black-and-white photography, he produced many color photographs. His archive contains nearly 9,000 35mm transparencies taken between 1955 and 1975.

In 1959 White mounted a large exhibition of 115 photos of his Sequence 13/Return to the Bud at the George Eastman House. It was his largest exhibition to date. It later traveled to the Portland Art Museum in Oregon. White was invited to teach a 10-days', all-expense-paid workshop in Portland to accompany the exhibition. He took advantage of the funding to photograph landscapes and did nature studies across the country. From his experience in Portland he developed the idea for a full-time residential workshop in Rochester in which students would learn through both formal sessions and, following a combination of thinking from Gurdjieff and from Zen, through an understanding gained by the discipline of such tasks as household chores and early morning workouts. He would continue this style of residential teaching until he died. In the early 1960s White studied hypnosis and incorporated the practice into some of his teachings.

White continued to teach extensively both privately and at RIT for the next several years. During this time he traveled across the U.S. in the summers taking photographs along the way. In his journal he referred to himself during this period as "The Wanderer." In 1962 he met Michael Hoffman, who became a friend, colleague and, later editor of Aperture magazine. White later named Hoffman to be the executor of his will.

=== Late career: 1965–1974 ===
In 1965 White was invited to help design a newly formed program in visual arts at the Massachusetts Institute of Technology (MIT) in Cambridge, Massachusetts, near Boston. After being appointed as a Visiting Professor, White moved to the Boston area and purchased a 12-room house in suburban Arlington so he could increase the size of his residential workshops for selected students. Soon after moving to the Boston area, he completed a different kind of sequence called Slow Dance, which he would later integrate into his teachings. He continued to explore how people understand and interpret photography and began to incorporate techniques of Gestalt psychology into his teachings. To help his students experience the meaning of "equivalence," he started requiring them to draw certain subjects as well as photograph them.

White was diagnosed with angina in 1966. His symptoms continued throughout the rest of his life, leading him to intensify his study of spiritual matters and meditation. He turned to astrology, and his interest in it became so significant that he required all of his current and prospective students to have their horoscopes completed. By this point in his life White's unorthodox teaching methods were well established. One student, John Loori, who later became abbot of Zen Mountain Monastery, said, "I really wanted to learn to see the way he did [...]. I didn't realize that Minor was teaching us [... ]not only to see images, but to feel them, smell them, taste them."

White began writing the text for Mirrors, Messages, Manifestations, which was the first monograph of his photographs, in late 1966, and three years later the book was published by Aperture. It included 243 of his photographs and text, including poems, notes from his journal and other writings. Peter Bunnell, who was one of White's early students and then Curator of Photography at the Museum of Modern Art, wrote a lengthy biography of White for the book. During this same time White completed Sequence 1968, a series of landscape images from his recent travels. During the next several years White conceived of and directed four major themed photography exhibitions at MIT, starting with "Light^{7}" in 1968 and followed by "Be-ing without Clothes" in 1970, "Octave of Prayer" in 1972 and "Celebrations" in 1974. Anyone could submit images for the shows, and White spent a great deal of time personally reviewing all of the submissions and selecting the final images.

White continued to teach extensively and make his own photographs even though his health was declining. He devoted more and more time to his writing and began a long text he called "Consciousness in Photography and the Creative Audience," in which he referred to his 1965 sequence Slow Dance and advanced the idea that certain states of heightened awareness were necessary to truly read a photograph and understand its meaning. To complete this work he applied for and received a Guggenheim Fellowship in 1970, and Consciousness in Photography and the Creative Audience became required reading for a new course he taught at MIT called "Creative Audience." in 1971 he traveled to Puerto Rico to explore more of his color photography, and in 1974 and 1975 he journeyed to Peru to teach and to further his own Gurdjieff studies.

In 1975 White traveled to England to lecture at the Victoria and Albert Museum and to teach classes at various colleges. He continued on a hectic travel schedule for several weeks, then flew directly to the University of Arizona in Tucson to take part in a symposium there. When he returned to Boston after nearly six weeks of travel, he suffered a heart attack and was hospitalized for several weeks. After this White's focus turned even more inward, and he photographed very little. He spent much of his time with his student Abe Frajndlich, who made a series of situational portraits of White around his home and in his garden. A few months before his death White published a short article in Parabola magazine called "The Diamond Lens of Fable" in which he associated himself with Gilgamesh, Jason and King Arthur, all heroes of old tales about lifelong quests.

On June 24, 1976, White died of a second heart attack while working at his home. He bequeathed all of his personal archives and papers, along with a large collection of his photographs, to Princeton University. He left his house to Aperture so they could continue the work he started there.

== Legacy ==
=== Retrospective ===
Peter Bunnell studied photography under White at the RIT in the late 1950s. Originally intending to pursue fashion photography, it was his exposure to White that drew him to reconsider photography as vehicle for personal artistic expression. White became a mentor to Bunnell and recruited him to join the staff of Aperture magazine. Bunnell gradually transitioned from being a photographer to studying the medium and its history, but his interest in – and friendship with – White endured until White’s passing in 1976.

Bunnell became the acknowledged expert on White’s work, and his 1989 book Minor White: The Eye That Shapes still stands as the most complete single source of information on the photographer.

=== Equivalence ===
White was greatly influenced by Stieglitz's concept of "equivalence," which White interpreted as allowing photographs to represent more than their subject matter. He wrote "when a photograph functions as an Equivalent, the photograph is at once a record of something in front of the camera and simultaneously a spontaneous symbol. (A 'spontaneous symbol' is one which develops automatically to fill the need of the moment. A photograph of the bark of a tree, for example, may suddenly touch off a corresponding feeling of roughness of character within an individual.)"

In his later life he often made photographs of rocks, surf, wood and other natural objects that were isolated from their context, so that they became abstract forms. He intended these to be interpreted by the viewer as something more than what they actually present. According to White, "When a photographer presents us with what to him is an Equivalent, he is telling us in effect, 'I had a feeling about something and here is my metaphor of that feeling.'...What really happened is that he recognized an object or series of forms that, when photographed, would yield an image with specific suggestive powers that can direct the viewer into a specific and known feeling, state, or place within himself."

In the introduction to his Fourth Sequence (1950), White wrote:

While rocks were photographed, the subject of the sequence is not rocks; while symbols seem to appear, they are barely pointers to significance. The meaning appears in the mood they raise in the beholder; and the flow of the sequence eddies in the river of his associations as he passes from picture to picture. The rocks are only the objects upon which the significance is spread like sheets on the ground to dry.

Not everyone agreed with or understood White's philosophy. Some of White's abstract images "have an indeterminacy that forestalls any conventional response." One critic wrote "Without a capacity to see in rocks some glimmer of essential form, as Weston did, or in clouds some hint of a universal life force, as Stieglitz did, one cannot understand White's pictures....One gets the impression that White did not develop as an artist in a linear sense so much as he oscillated between conflicting poles."

=== Sequences ===
In the mid-1940s White began to articulate a philosophy about the importance of how his photographs are presented to the viewer. He was influenced initially by Stieglitz, who in his teaching emphasized that photographs shown in a structured content may support each other and may create a total statement that is more complex and meaningful than the individual images by themselves. When White began working as a photographer at the Museum of Modern Art in 1945 he became friends with Nancy Newhall, who was organizing a retrospective of Edward Weston's photographs for the museum. Newhall had a gift for creating highly distinct groupings of images, and White said later that her installation of the Weston exhibit was a revelation to him.

For the rest of his life he spent a great deal of time grouping and regrouping his photographs into specific sets of images that varied in number from 10 to more than 100 prints. He described what he called a sequence as a "cinema of stills" that he felt would impart a "feeling-state" created by both the photographer and the personality of the individual viewer.

In his early sequences (through 1952) he included various poems and other texts with his images. As he evolved his thinking about sequences, he gradually stopped using texts. At the same time many of his images became more and more abstract. Although he felt strongly about the particular groupings of his images, in his early sequences he purposely did not prescribe a specific order for how they should be presented. He said he wanted his sequences to be subjective interpretations, and as such he wanted viewers to gain insights into themselves by allowing them to contemplate his work as they saw fit. This concept was limited to those viewers who were part of his workshops and teachings, where they could handle the prints individually rather than see them in a gallery.

Two iterations of Power Spot (1970). White flipped the negative vertically between the first and the second version.

Later, as he became more interested in anthropology and myth, he began to experiment with how individual images influenced a viewer by how they were presented. In a work he called Totemic Sequence, composed of 10 photographs, he included the same image as both the opening and the closing picture. The last picture is the first picture turned upside down. White felt that this change illustrated the simultaneous reality and unreality in a photograph. The title he gave to the first image was "Power Spot."

White wrote extensively about his thought about sequences, both in his journal and in articles. In his journal he wrote "The photographs in a Sequence or Constellation may be compared to a dance or theme. The major points of the whole are stated and restated with variations until the very last member of the audience has encountered it or them." He also wrote "Sequence now means that the joy of photographing in the light of the sun is balanced by the joy of editing in the light of the mind."

During his lifetime White created or planned about 100 groups of his photographs, including sequences (with multiple versions), series and portfolios. Many were named simply "Sequence" followed by a number, but for several he added artistic titles that reflected his ideas that photographs represent more than their obvious subject matter.

Some of his major sequences are:

- Song Without Words (1947)
- Second Sequence: Amputations (1947)
- The Temptation of St. Anthony Is Mirrors (1948). This sequence is White's most personal body of work, composed entirely of photos of a model at CSFA named Tom Murphy. The 32 images include intimate portraits and figure studies, many of which showed Murphy's frontal full-nude body. At the time it was illegal to either exhibit or publish images that explicitly showed male genitals, and if White would have let it be known that he had taken the photographs he would have been exposed as a homosexual and subjected to harassment and loss of his job. He mounted and bound two copies of the photos into small, hand-made books, gave one to Murphy and kept the other copy for himself. Many of the photos in this sequence were never published during his lifetime, and the complete sequence was exhibited for the first time only in 2014 at the J. Paul Getty Museum in Los Angeles.
- Sequence 11 / The Young Man as Mystic (1955)
- Sequence 13 / Return to the Bud (1959)
- Sequence 16 / The Sound of One Hand (1960)
- Sequence 17 / Out of My love for You I Will Try to Give You Back Yourself (1963)
- Slow Dance (1965). White stepped outside of his usual methods in creating this sequence, which consists of 80 color slides intended to be seen on dual projectors. It was inspired by his interest in movement as interpreted through Gurdjieff's "rhythmic rituals."
- Totemic Sequence (1974)

=== Quotations ===
- "At first glance a photograph can inform us. At second glance it can reach us."
- "Be still with yourself until the object of your attention affirms your presence."
- "Camera and I have gotten into some eye pursuit of intensified consciousness."
- "Equivalency functions on the assumption that the following equation is factual: Photograph + Person Looking Mental Image."
- "In becoming a photographer I am only changing medium. The essential core of both verse and photography is poetry."
- My own place in this thing called "photography"? Lately it has come to my attention that perhaps I have a place in it, not entirely held by others.
- "One should not only photograph things for what they are but for what else they are."
- "When the photograph is a mirror of the man and the man is a mirror of the world, then Spirit might take over."
- "Everything has been photographed. Accept this. Photograph things better."
- "No matter how slow the film, Spirit always stands still long enough for the photographer It has chosen."

== See also ==
- List of LGBT people from Portland, Oregon
