= Beaumont Newhall =

American art historian

- Newhall c. 1943
- Born: June 22, 1908; Lynn, Massachusetts, U.S.
- Died: February 26, 1993 (aged 84); Santa Fe, New Mexico, U.S.
- Education: Harvard University
- Known for: Photography, writing
- Notable work: The History of Photography
- Spouse: Nancy Newhall

Beaumont Newhall (June 22, 1908 – February 26, 1993) was an American curator, art historian, writer, photographer, and the second director of the George Eastman Museum. His book, The History of Photography, remains one of the most significant accounts in the field and has become a classic photographic history textbook. Newhall was the recipient of numerous awards and accolades for his accomplishments in the study of photographic history.

== Early life and education ==
Beaumont Newhall was born in Lynn, Massachusetts, United States, on June 22, 1908. He was the son of Herbert W. Newhall and Alice Lillia Davis. Some of his earliest childhood memories revolved around photography. He recalled watching his mother in her darkroom as she developed her own glass plate images, as well as dipping his fingers into the chemical trays to see what they tasted like.

Although Newhall wanted to study film and photography in college, the subjects were not taught as separate disciplines when he enrolled at Harvard University. Instead, he chose to study art history and museum studies.

While at Harvard, Newhall was greatly influenced by his instructor Paul J. Sachs. In 1932, after receiving his master's degree from Harvard, Sachs helped Newhall obtain a position as a lecturer at the Philadelphia Museum of Art in Philadelphia.

Newhall continued his graduate studies at the Institute of Art and Archaeology of the University of Paris and the Courtauld Institute of Art in London. He worked briefly for the Metropolitan Museum of Art in New York and the Massachusetts branch of the Public Works Administration. Due to financial difficulties during the Great Depression, Newhall was not able to devote himself to his doctoral studies and eventually accepted a position at the Museum of Modern Art as a stable source of income.

== Museum of Modern Art ==
Newhall's career at the Museum of Modern Art began in 1935 when he became its librarian. In 1937, he was invited by Alfred Barr Jr., the director of MoMA, to develop the first comprehensive retrospective of photographic works. The exhibition that Newhall mounted was pivotal in securing photography's place within the arts. Its accompanying catalog, The History of Photography, was the first account of the first 100 years of photographic history that gave equal credit to its technical virtues, as well as its value as an art form. Lewis Mumford, in his review in The New Yorker, noted that Newhall, "who assembled the photographs and instruments for the Museum, did an admirable job in ransacking the important collections for historic examples" and praised his catalog as "a very comprehensive and able piece of exposition; one of the best short critical histories I know in any language." The show toured 10 other American museums, and the catalog long outlived the exhibition to become a significant resource.

In 1940, Newhall became the first curator of MoMA's photography department and decisively began collecting for the Museum, starting with the work of László Moholy-Nagy. Newhall married Nancy Wynne, a notable photography critic who worked in his place as curator at MoMA during his service in World War II. Newhall served as a photo-interpreter of aerial photographs taken over enemy territory in Italy and North Africa. He held the rank of First Lieutenant and later returned to the United States to train others.

In 1946, Newhall was invited by Josef Albers to lecture on the history of photography at Black Mountain College. He resigned from MoMA in 1947 after discovering that Edward Steichen was to direct the photography department, while Newhall was to remain as curator. However, he agreed to contribute an introduction to the MoMA exhibition catalog for Henri Cartier-Bresson.

== George Eastman Museum ==
Newhall received a Guggenheim Fellowship and used it to produce a new edition of The History of Photography. He also began research into the history of the daguerreotype in America, where its use continued for a decade after becoming obsolete in Europe.

From 1948 to 1958, Newhall served as curator of the George Eastman Museum, housed in the former residence of George Eastman in Rochester, New York. He then became its director, a position he held until 1971. While at the Eastman Museum, Newhall was responsible for amassing one of the largest photographic collections in the world.

He was joined there by Minor White, who took over as editor of Image, the magazine Newhall founded at the Museum. Image was later passed on to Nathan Lyons, who transformed it into a respected quarterly.

Newhall also published several books through the Museum, including Edward Weston's Daybooks (co-published with Horizon Press), Photographers on Photography (edited by Lyons), and works on Aaron Siskind. He remained an honorary trustee of the Eastman Museum until his death.

== Educator, late career and death ==
Throughout his career, Newhall taught the history of photography and photography at institutions including the University of Rochester, Rochester Institute of Technology, the State University of New York at Buffalo, and the Salzburg Seminar in American Studies in Austria.

After retiring from the George Eastman Museum, he was appointed professor at the University of New Mexico in 1972 and was named professor emeritus in 1984.

Beaumont Newhall died in Santa Fe, New Mexico, on February 26, 1993. He was predeceased by his wife, Nancy, who died on July 7, 1974, from injuries sustained when she was struck by a falling tree on the Snake River in Grand Teton National Park.

== Library and archives ==
The Getty Research Institute in Los Angeles, California, houses the Beaumont and Nancy Newhall papers. The private research library of Beaumont and Nancy Newhall was donated to the College of Santa Fe (later Santa Fe University of Art and Design) in New Mexico before the university's closure in 2018.

== Cookery writer ==
Newhall wrote 234 weekly food articles in his column, "Epicure Corner," for the local New York paper, the Brighton-Pittsford Post, from 1956 to 1969. A collection of his writings and recipes was published in 2009 as Beaumont's Kitchen.

== Awards ==
- 1970: The Cultural Award from the German Society for Photography (DGPh), with Leo Fritz Gruber
- 2005: Newhall was posthumously inducted into the International Photography Hall of Fame and Museum.

== Publications ==
- Newhall, Beaumont, 1908-; Daguerre, Louis, 1787-1857 (1839), An historical and descriptive account of the various processes of the daguerreotype and the diorama, Winter House (republication of vintage text)
- Museum of Modern Art (New York, N.Y.); Barr, Alfred Hamilton, 1902-; Miller, Dorothy Canning, 1904-, (comp.); Newhall, Beaumont, 1908-; Fantl, Ernestine Mary, 1907-, (joint comp.) (1936), Cubism and abstract art: painting, sculpture, constructions, photography, architecture, industrial art, theatre, films, posters, typography, The Museum of Modern Art
- Newhall, Beaumont (1947), A check list of books on photography published in America before the civil war, New York
- Newhall, Beaumont (1949), The history of photography from 1839 to the present day (Rev. and enl. ed.), Museum of Modern Art, ISBN 978-0-87070-374-4
- Newhall, Beaumont; Newhall, Beaumont, 1908- (1956), On photography: a source book of photo history in facsimile, Century House
- Newhall, Beaumont; Newhall, Beaumont, 1908-1993, (editor,); Newhall, Nancy, (editor,) (1958), Masters of photography, George Braziller, Inc
- Newhall, Beaumont (1961), The daguerreotye in America, Duell, Sloane & Pearce
- Vroman, A. C. (Adam Clark); Mahood, Ruth I. (Ruth Ione), (editor.); Weinstein, Robert A, (editor.); Newhall, Beaumont, 1908-1993, (writer of introduction.) (1961), Photographer of the Southwest: Adam Clark Vroman, 1856-1916, The Ward Ritchie Press, ISBN 978-0-378-02502-7;
- Cartier-Bresson, Henri; Kirstein, Lincoln, 1907-; Newhall, Beaumont, 1908-; Museum of Modern Art (New York, N.Y.) (1964), Photographs by Cartier-Bresson, Cape
- O'Sullivan, Timothy H; Newhall, Beaumont, 1908-; Newhall, Nancy; Amon Carter Museum of Western Art (1966), T.H. O'Sullivan: photographer, G. Eastman House in collaboration with the Amon Carter Museum of Western Art
- Newhall, Beaumont (1967), Latent image: the discovery of photography (1st ed.), Doubleday
- Beaumont Newhall (1969), Airborne camera the world from the air and outer space, New York Hastings House, ISBN 978-0-8038-0335-0
- Newhall, Beaumont; Newhall, Nancy (1969), A collection of photographs, Aperture Inc
- Newhall, Beaumont; Evans, Frederick H; Alfred Stieglitz Center (1973), Frederick H. Evans: photographer of the majesty, light, and space of the medieval cathedrals of England and France, Aperture, ISBN 978-0-912334-48-6
- Newhall, Beaumont; Edkins, Diana, (joint author.) (1974), William H. Jackson, Morgan & Morgan, ISBN 978-0-87100-045-3
- Coke, Van Deren, 1921-; Newhall, Beaumont, 1908- (1975), One hundred years of photographic history: essays in honor of Beaumont Newhall (1st ed.), University of New Mexico Press, ISBN 978-0-8263-0344-8
- Weston, Brett; Newhall, Beaumont, 1908-1993, (writer of afterword.); Aperture, Inc (1975), Voyage of the eye, Aperture, Inc, ISBN 978-0-912334-84-4
- Bayer, Herbert; Newhall, Beaumont, 1908-; ARCO Center for Visual Art (1977), Herbert Bayer: photographic works an exhibition, The Center
- Newhall, Beaumont, 1908- (1980), Photography: Essays & Images: Illustrated Readings in the History of Photography, Museum of Modern Art, ISBN 978-0-87070-385-0
- Menil Foundation; Newhall, Beaumont, 1908-; Glassman, Elizabeth; Davidson, Kathryn; Rice Museum (1980), Transfixed by light: photographs from the Menil Foundation collection: exhibition at the Rice Museum, Institute for the Arts, Rice University, March 21-May 24, 1981, Menil Foundation, ISBN 978-0-939594-00-9
- Newhall, Beaumont (1983), Photography and the book: delivered on the occasion of the eighth Bromsen lecture, May 3, 1980, Trustees of the Public Library of the City of Boston, ISBN 978-0-89073-066-9
- Newhall, Beaumont; Adams, Ansel, 1902-1984 (1983), In plain sight: the photographs of Beaumont Newhall (1st ed.), G.M. Smith, ISBN 978-0-87905-086-3
- Weston, Edward, 1886-1958; Newhall, Beaumont, 1908-; Conger, Amy, 1942- (1984), Edward Weston omnibus: a critical anthology, G.M. Smith: Peregrine Smith Books, ISBN 978-0-87905-131-0
- Weston, Edward; Newhall, Beaumont, 1908-; University of Arizona. Center for Creative Photography (1986), Supreme instants: the photography of Edward Weston (1st ed.), Little, Brown, ISBN 978-0-8212-1621-7
- Beaumont Newhall The Challenge of photography to this art historian. In Barrow, Thomas F; Newhall, Beaumont, 1908-; Walch, Peter, 1940- (1986), Perspectives on photography: essays in honor of Beaumont Newhall (1st ed.), University of New Mexico Press, ISBN 978-0-8263-0863-4
- Newhall, Beaumont (1993), Focus: memoirs of a life in photography (1st ed.), Little, Brown, ISBN 978-0-8212-1904-1
- Newhall, Beaumont (2009), Beaumont's kitchen: lessons on food, life, and photography with Beaumont Newhall, Radius Books, ISBN 978-1-934435-06-9
