= Consuelo Kanaga =

American photographer and writer (1894–1978)

- Born: Consuelo Delesseps Kanaga; May 25, 1894; Astoria, Oregon, U.S.
- Died: February 28, 1978 (aged 83); Yorktown Heights, New York, U.S.
- Known for: Photography

Consuelo Delesseps Kanaga (May 25, 1894 – February 28, 1978) was an American photographer and writer who became well known for her photographs of African-Americans. In the 1930s, she participated with Group f/64 and became a member of the Photo League. Her work was shown at the Museum of Modern Art in the 50 Photographs by 50 Photographers: Landmarks in Photographic History exhibition in 1949. She also documented the nascent American peace movement and their early protests against nuclear weapons.

== Life ==
Kanaga was born on May 25, 1894, in Astoria, Oregon, the second child of Amos Ream Kanaga and Mathilda Carolina Hartwig. Her father was a successful lawyer and judge in Ohio. After moving to Astoria he became the district attorney for the city, and he also traveled widely, often leaving his family behind with little notice. After they moved to California in 1915 her mother became a real estate broker, a highly unusual occupation for a woman at that time. The last name "Kanaga" is of Swiss origin, and a family genealogy traces its roots back at least 250 years. She spelled her first name "Consuela," at least in the 1920s and '30s, but it is generally listed now as Consuelo, a more common Spanish name. Her middle name "Delesseps" is said to have come from her mother's admiration for Ferdinand de Lesseps, the French diplomat and developer of the Suez Canal.

In 1911 the family moved from Oregon to Larkspur in Marin County, California. In 1915 Kanaga got a job as a reporter, feature writer and part-time photographer for the San Francisco Chronicle. Dorothea Lange later said that Kanaga was the first female newspaper photographer she had ever encountered. It was there that she discovered Alfred Stieglitz's journal Camera Work and decided to become a photographer. Lange encouraged her to take up photography as a career and introduced her to the growing San Francisco Bay Area community of artistic photographers, notably Anne Brigman, Edward Weston, Francis Bruguière, and Louise Dahl.

In 1919, Kanaga married mining engineer Evans Davidson, but they separated within two years. In 1922, she moved to New York to work as a photojournalist for the New York American newspaper. While in New York a co-worker at the newspaper, Donald Litchfield, introduced her to Alfred Stieglitz. Stieglitz worked with Kanaga to help transform her vision from photojournalism to a more artistic photographic style. By March 1923 she was living with Litchfield, although at the time she had not yet divorced Davidson. In 1924, she and Litchfield moved to California, living at times near Santa Cruz, San Francisco and Los Angeles. By the end of the year she had finalized divorce proceedings against Davidson, and she became engaged to Litchfield. The engagement lasted only six months, and by the end of the year they were no longer a couple.

In 1926, Kanaga met Tina Modotti, who was visiting San Francisco, and she assembled a small exhibition of Modotti's photographs at the Kanaga Studio on Post Street. Aided by art patron Albert Bender, she planned a prolonged "tour" of Europe, and in 1927 she spent the latter part of the year traveling and photographing in France, Germany, Hungary and Italy. While there she met up with Dahl, and the two of them spent many weeks traveling together.

While traveling to Tunisia in January 1928, Kanaga met James Barry McCarthy, an Irish writer and ex-pilot, and by March they were married. In May of the same year, they returned to New York City and took up residence there. Kanaga initially found work as a photographic retoucher, but within a few months she had her own darkroom and was printing the first of her many photos from Europe. In 1930 she and McCarthy moved to San Francisco, and soon she was re-established in the photographic community there.

In 1931 she met and began to employ African-American Eluard Luchell McDaniels, a young "man-of-all-trades" who worked for her as a handyman and chauffeur. She began to photograph him around her home, and as they talked she became captivated by the plight of African-Americans and their continuing fight against racism. Soon she was devoting much of her photography to images of African-Americans, their homes and their culture.

in 1932 she was invited by Weston and Ansel Adams to participate in the famous Group f/64 show at the M.H. de Young Memorial Museum, and she showed four prints. There is some confusion about whether Kanaga should actually be called a "member" of Group f/64. The announcement for the show at the de Young Museum listed seven photographers in Group f/64 and said "From time to time various other photographers will be asked to display their work with Group f/64. Those invited for the first showing are: Preston Holder, Consuela Kanaga, Alma Lavenson, Brett Weston." In 1934 the group posted a notice in Camera Craft magazine that said "The F:64 group includes in its membership such well known names as Edward Weston, Ansel Adams, Willard Van Dyke, John Paul Edwards, Imogene [sic] Cunningham, Consuela Kanaga and several others." In an interview later in her life, Kanaga herself said "I was in that f/64 show with Edward Weston, Imogen Cunningham, Willard Van Dyke and Ansel Adams, but I wasn't in a group, nor did I belong to anything ever. I wasn't a belonger."

In 1935 she moved back to New York without McCarthy, and the two apparently were divorced sometime that year. She began plans for a portfolio of African Americans and interviewed several families in Harlem with whom she hoped to live while documenting their lives. While there she encountered painter Wallace Putnam, whom she had met the last time she lived in New York. Within three months they were married. They spent part of their honeymoon visiting Alfred Stieglitz at his home at Lake George.

In 1938 she joined the Photo League, where she lectured a new generation of artistic photographers and became the leader of the Documentary Group projects, including Neighborhoods of New York. Her photographs were printed in progressive publications of the time, including New Masses, Labor Defender, and Sunday Worker. By 1940 she found teaching too restrictive, and she returned to taking photographs full time. She was actively photographing and exhibiting throughout the 1940s, 50s and 60s. In the latter decade she became very active in civil rights, and she took part in and photographed many demonstrations and marches. In 1963 she was arrested in Albany, Georgia, during the Quebec-Washington-Guantanamo Peace Walk.

She finally seemed to have found the right romantic and creative partner in Putnam, and the two of them remained together for the rest of her life. They traveled frequently and spent the last half of the 1960s going back and forth to France.

A review published in The New York Times described that "She continued to work into her 70s, despite suffering from emphysema and cancer, which were probably caused by the chemicals used in creating her prints. Her body of work, though comparatively small, is consistently exceptional. Consuelo Kanaga died virtually unknown on February 28, 1978, but her talent endures." Her entire estate amounted to $1,345 in photographic equipment, almost 2,500 negatives and 375 prints. Everything else she had given away to friends. Recent years have seen her reclaimed as a transcendent artist: “If I could make one true, quiet photograph,” she said, “I would much prefer it to having a lot of answers.”

== Photography ==
Consuelo Kanaga has been called "one of America's most transcendent yet, surprisingly, least-known photographers." She had a wide range of visual interests, from pictorialism to photojournalism to portraiture to cityscape to still lifes. It's been said that the dominant theme in her work is an "abiding interest in, and engagement with, the American scene." She celebrated the human in every photo she took, whether it was images of sharecroppers and their homes in the South or found still lifes of flowers and curtains. She was also noted as a technician of the highest skills in the darkroom.

Her portraiture included many well-known artists and writers of the 1930s and '40s, including Milton Avery, Morris Kantor, Wharton Esherick, Mark Rothko and W. Eugene Smith.

Kanaga, who was white, was one of the few photographers in the 1930s to produce artistic portraits of black people. Significantly, the four prints she contributed to the first Group f/64 exhibition were all portraits of blacks, including two of Eluard Luchell McDaniel, whom she would photograph repeatedly in ensuing years. Kanaga also photographed black writers and intellectuals, among them Langston Hughes and Countee Cullen.

In 1949 she was included in the very important show 50 Photographs by 50 Photographers: Landmarks in Photographic History at the Museum of Modern Art in New York.

In 2024-2025 her photographs were exhibited in “Consuelo Kanaga: Catch the Spirit;” the show was organized by the Brooklyn Museum, Fundación MAPFRE and the San Francisco Museum of Modern Art and was exhibited in Barcelona, Madrid, San Francisco and Brooklyn. An exhibition catalog Consuelo Kanaga, was published by Thames & Hudson. ISBN 9780500028360

=== Family of Man ===
Kanaga's best-known image, "She Is a Tree of Life to Them," was given its title by Edward Steichen when he selected it for the landmark Family of Man exhibition in 1955. The picture, from a study of migrant workers in Florida, portrays a slender black woman, framed against a white wall, who gathers her children to her with a tender gesture.

She continued photographing through the 1960s, including a series of photographs of civil rights demonstrations in Albany, Georgia, in 1963. In 1974 Kanaga had a one-person exhibition at the Lerner-Heller Gallery in New York and in 1976, a small but important retrospective at The Brooklyn Museum. In 1977 she had an exhibition at Wave Hill, Riverdale, New York, followed by participation in an historical exhibition of the original f.64 group of photographers at the University of Missouri.

On October 15, 1993, the first major retrospective of Consuelo Kanagas work was held at the Brooklyn Museum. The exhibition was titled, Consuelo Kanaga: An American Photographer and ran until February 27, 1994. The exhibition contained approximately 120 gelatin silver prints, many of which had never been seen before or published. They were all drawn from a cache of more than 2000 negatives and 340 prints left to the Brooklyn Museum in 1982 by the artist's husband and painter, Wallace Putnam. A fully illustrated catalogue published by the Brooklyn Museum in association with University of Washington Press accompanied the exhibition. The publication included an introduction by William Maxwell and essays by Barbara Head Millstein and Sarah M. Lowe.

About her work, she said:

I could have done lots more, put in much more work and developed more pictures, but I had also a desire to say what I felt about life. Simple things like a little picture in the window or the corner of the studio or an old stove in the kitchen have always been fascinating to me. They are very much alive, these flowers and grasses with the dew on them. Stieglitz always said, "What have you got to say?" I think in a few small cases I've said a few things, expressed how I felt, trying to show the horror of poverty or the beauty of black people. I think that in photography what you've done is what you've had to say. In everything this has been the message of my life. A simple supper, being with someone you love, seeing a deer come around to eat or drink at the barn - I like things like that. If I could make one true, quiet photograph, I would much prefer it to having a lot of answers.

== Gallery ==
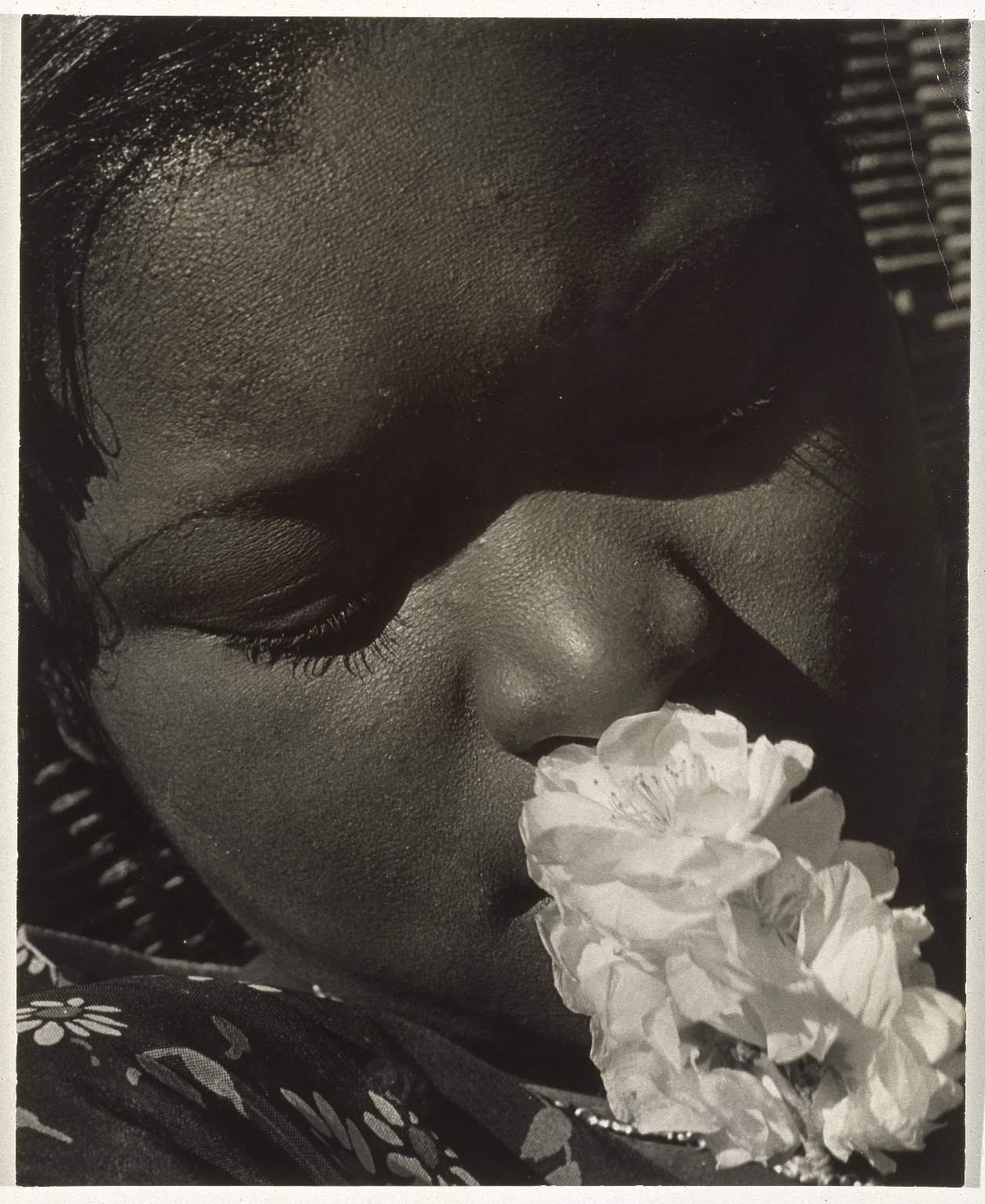
Consuelo Kanaga, Frances with a Flower, early 1930s. Brooklyn Museum

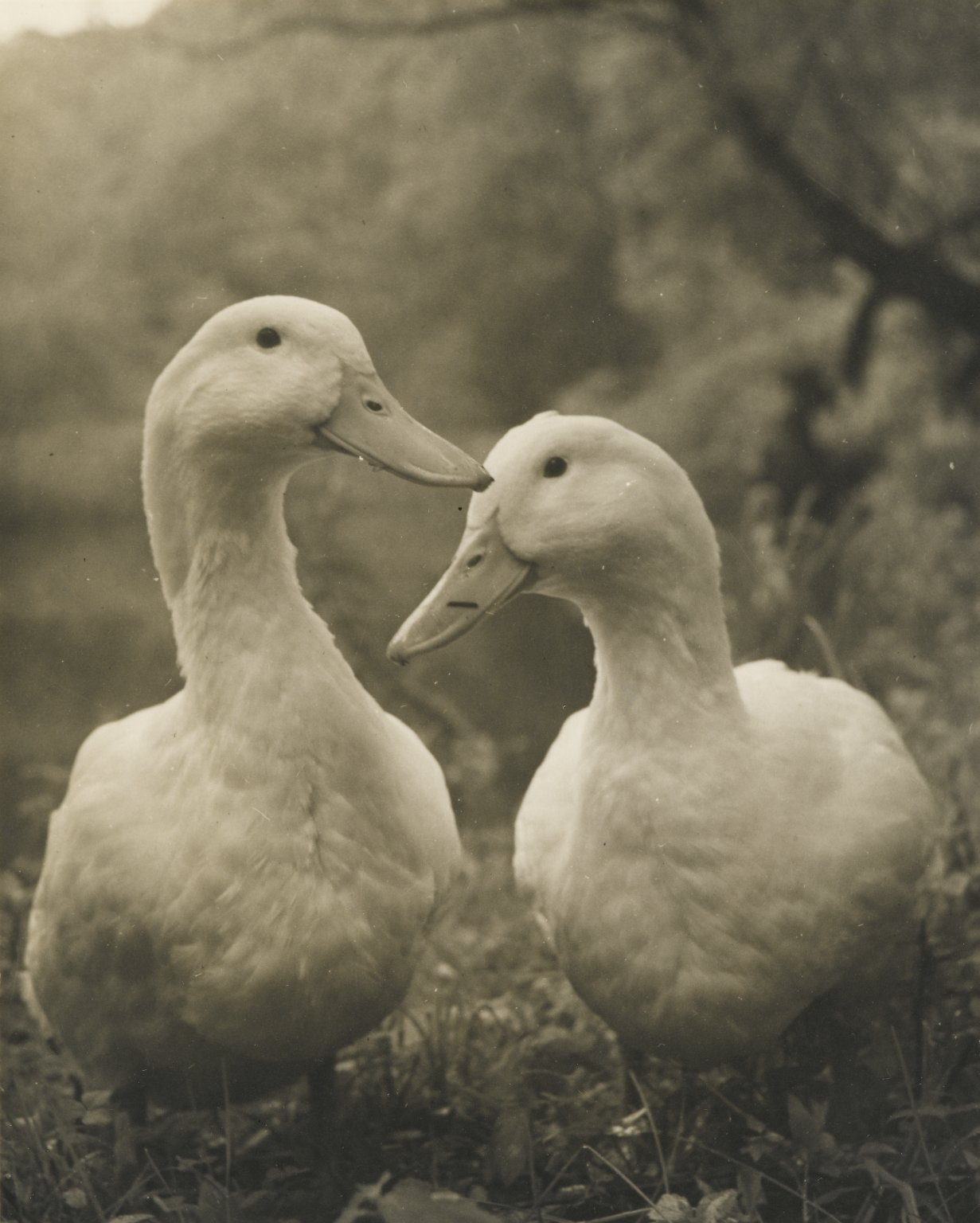
Consuelo Kanaga, [Untitled] (Two Ducks). Brooklyn Museum

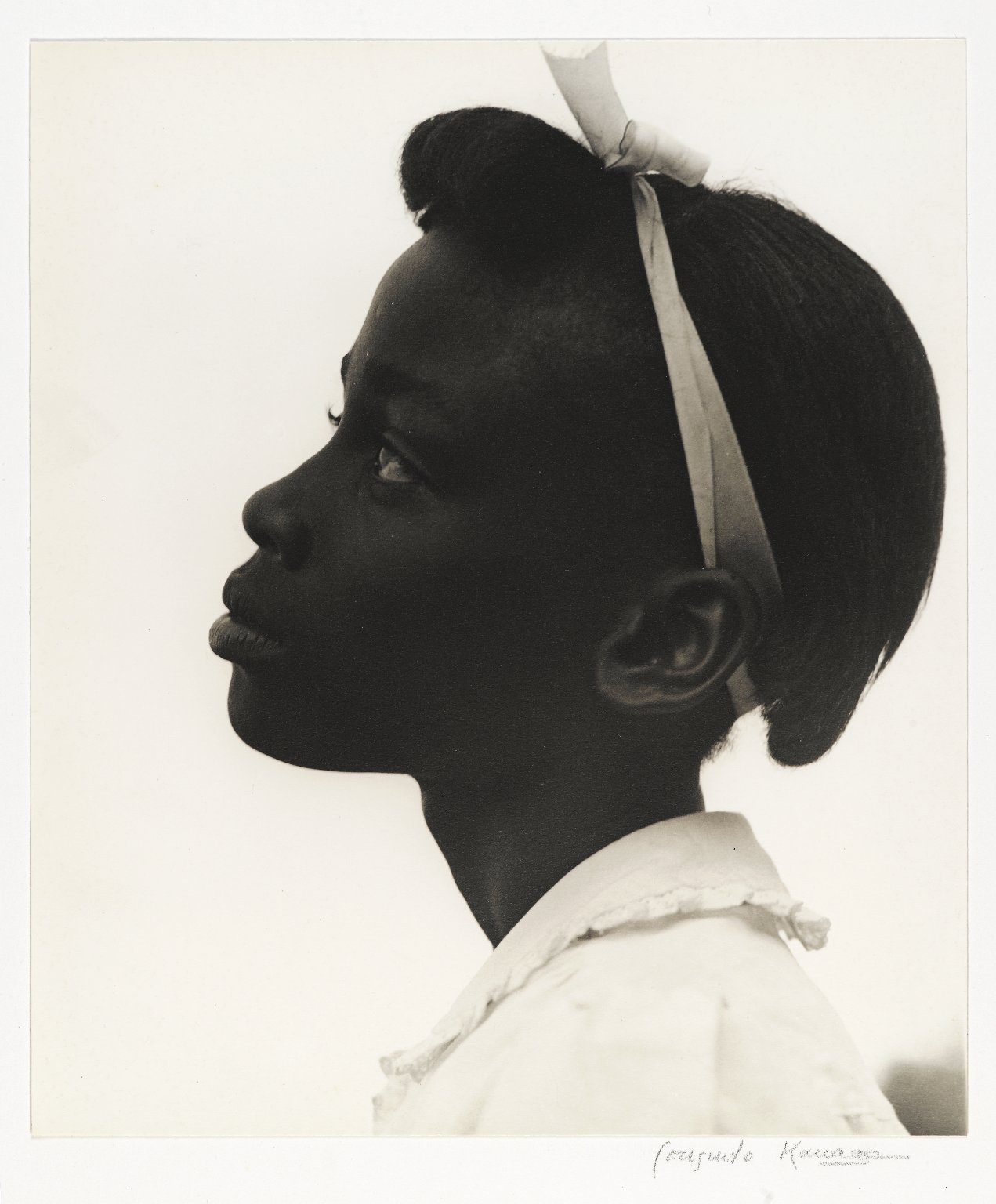
Consuelo Kanaga, [Young Girl in Profile] (from the Tennessee series), 1948. Brooklyn Museum

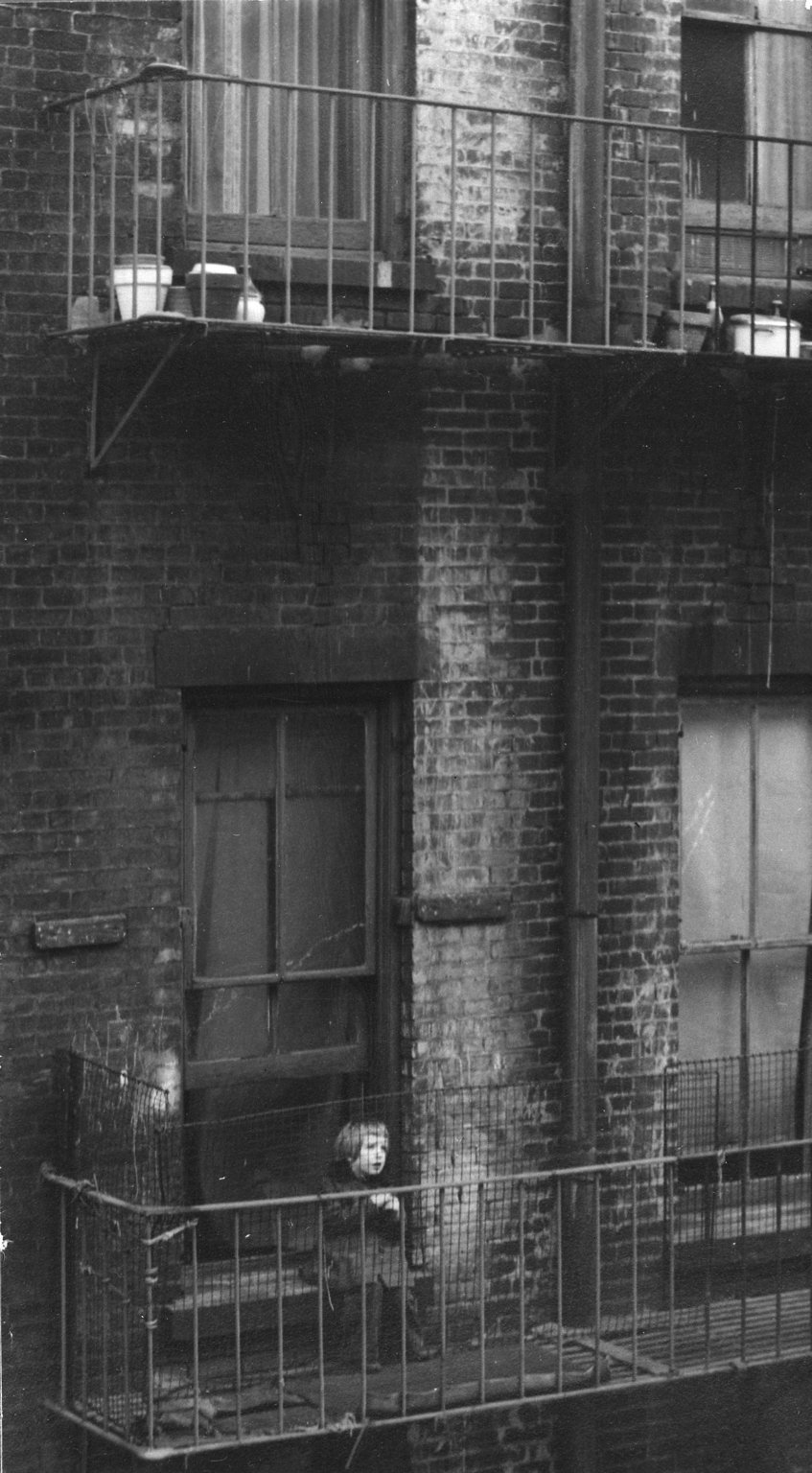
Consuelo Kanaga, Untitled (Tenement, Child on Fire Escape, New York), mid-late 1930s. Brooklyn Museum

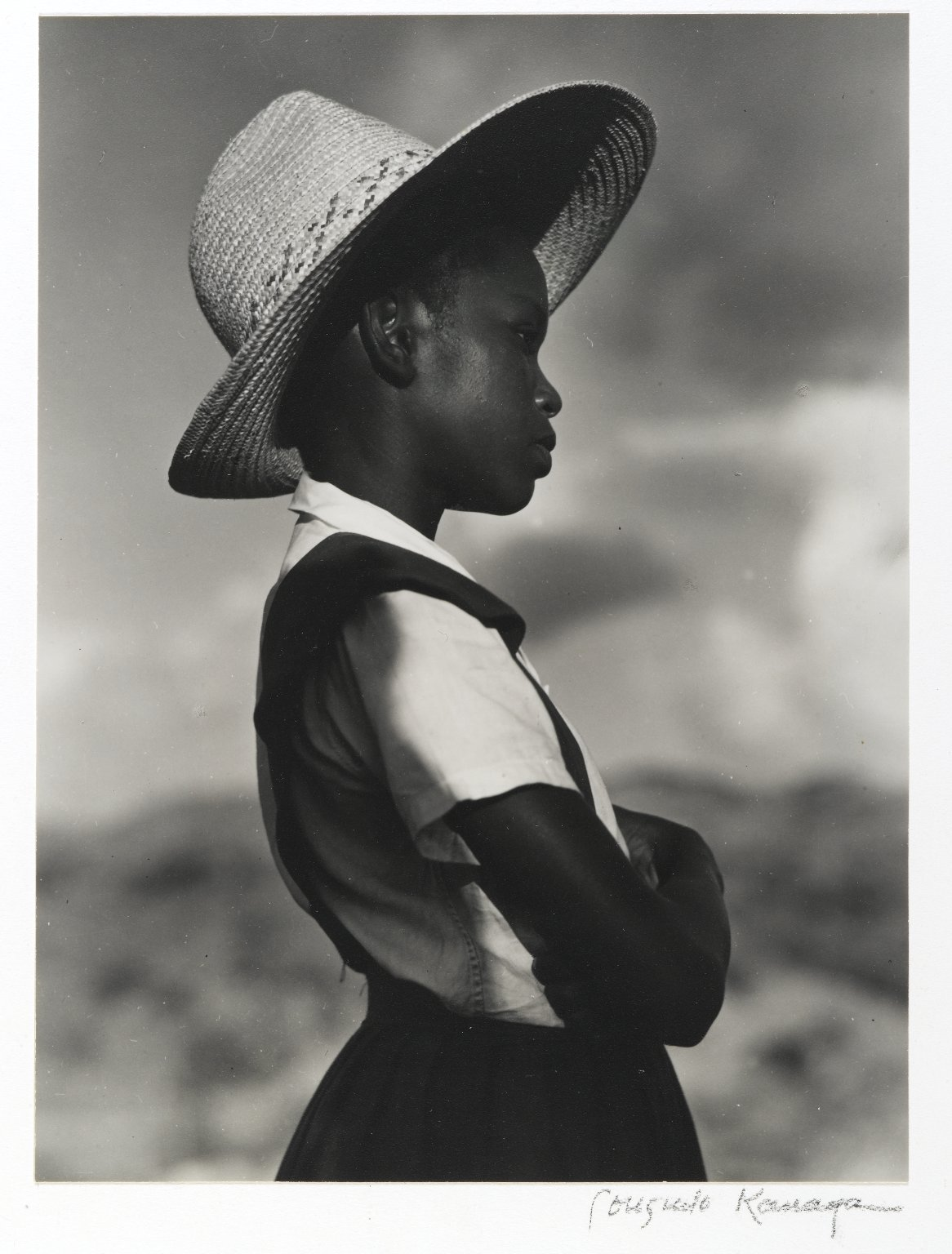
Consuelo Kanaga, School Girl, St. Croix, 1963. Brooklyn Museum

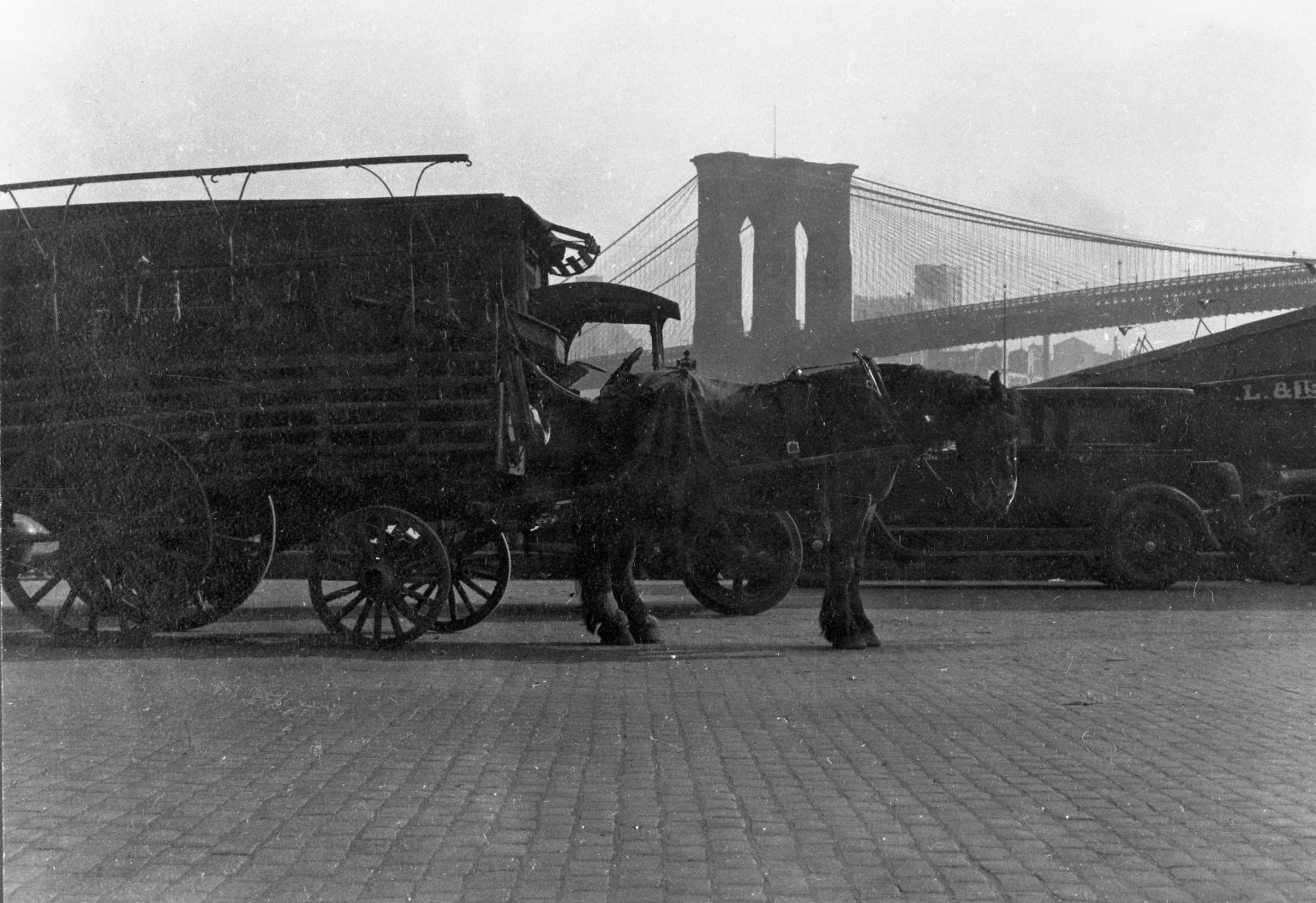
Consuelo Kanaga, Untitled, (Horse Drawn Wagon), 1922-1924. Brooklyn Museum

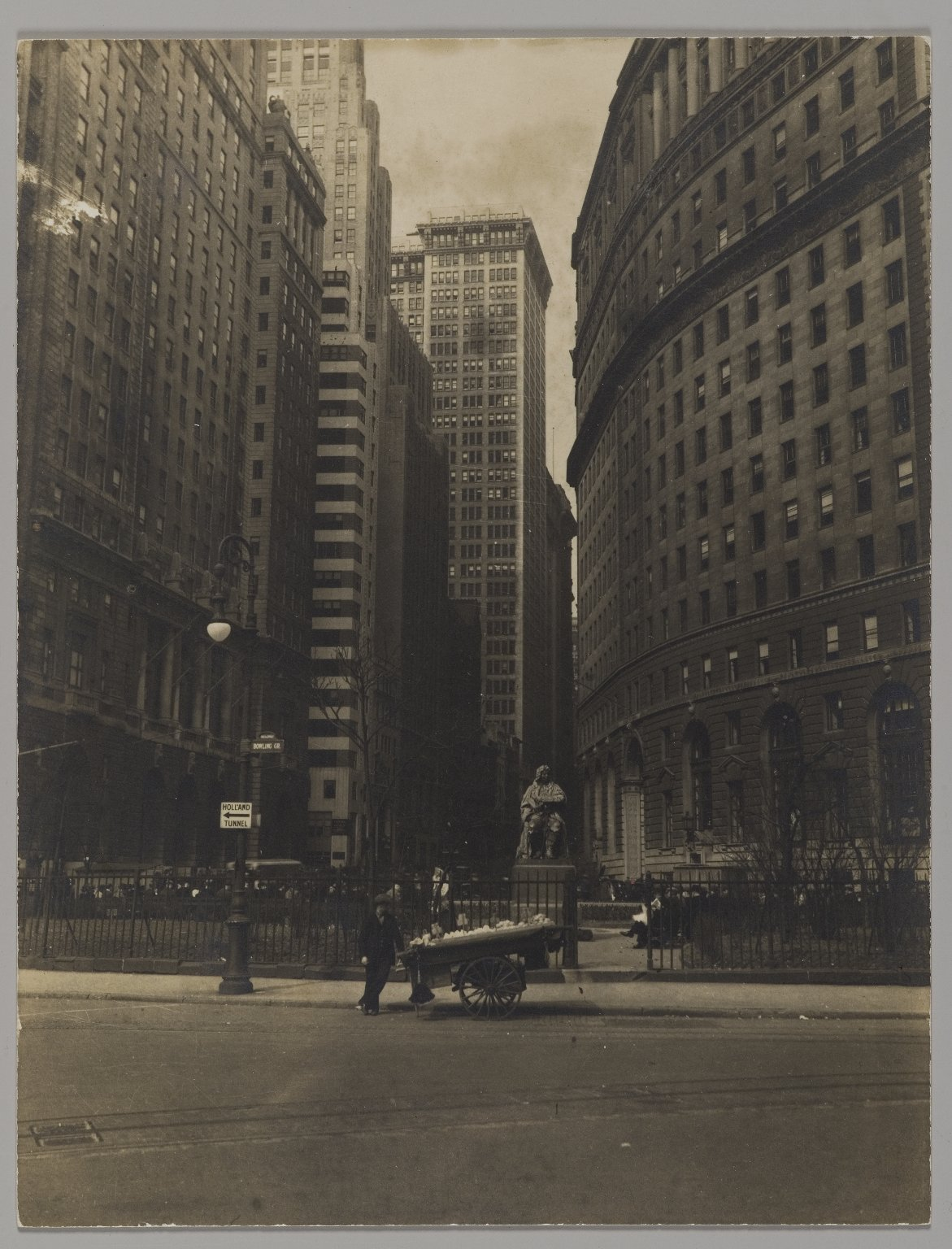
Consuelo Kanaga, Untitled (Bowling Green, NYC). Brooklyn Museum

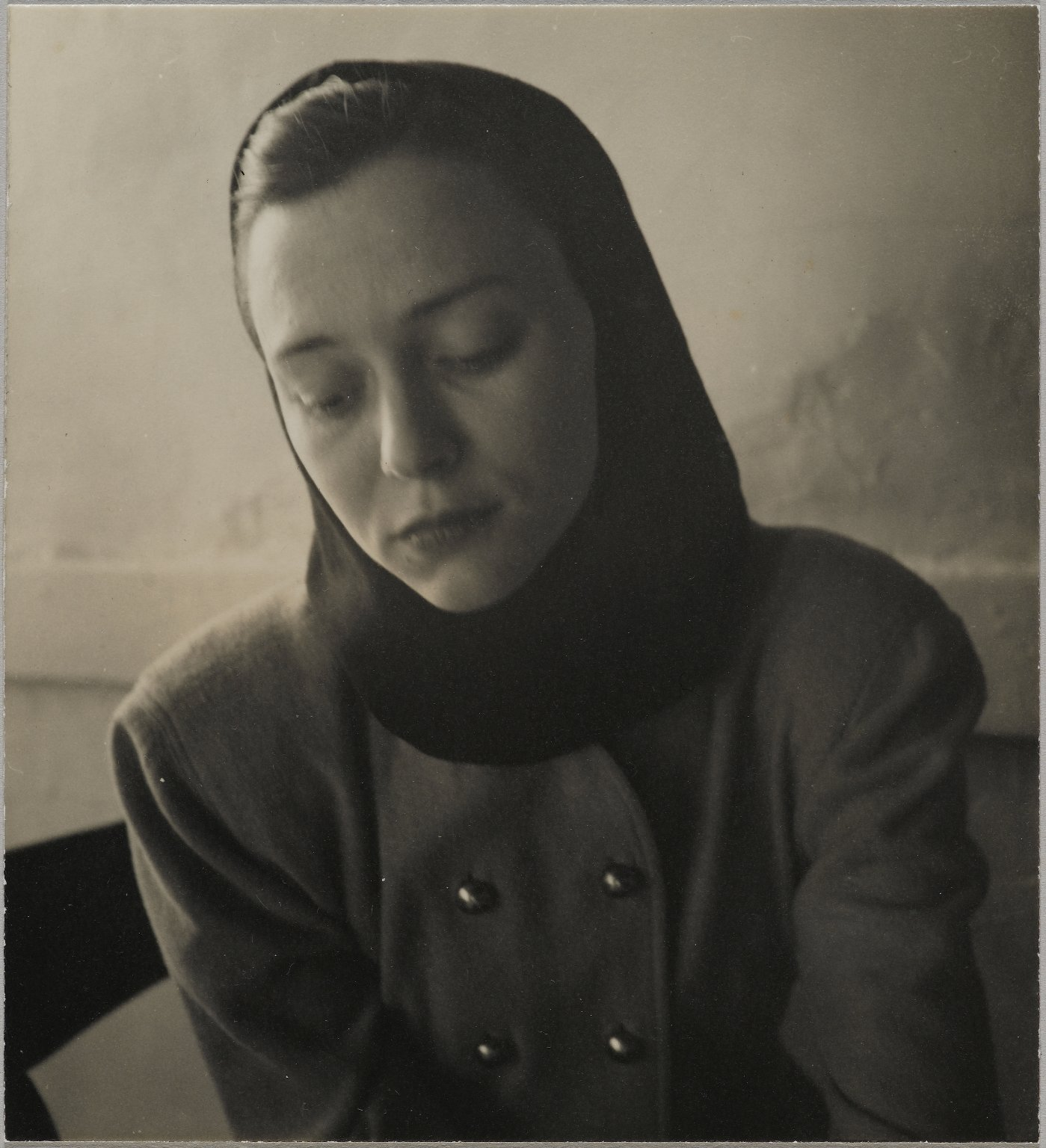
Consuelo Kanaga,[Untitled] (Woman in a Hood). Brooklyn Museum

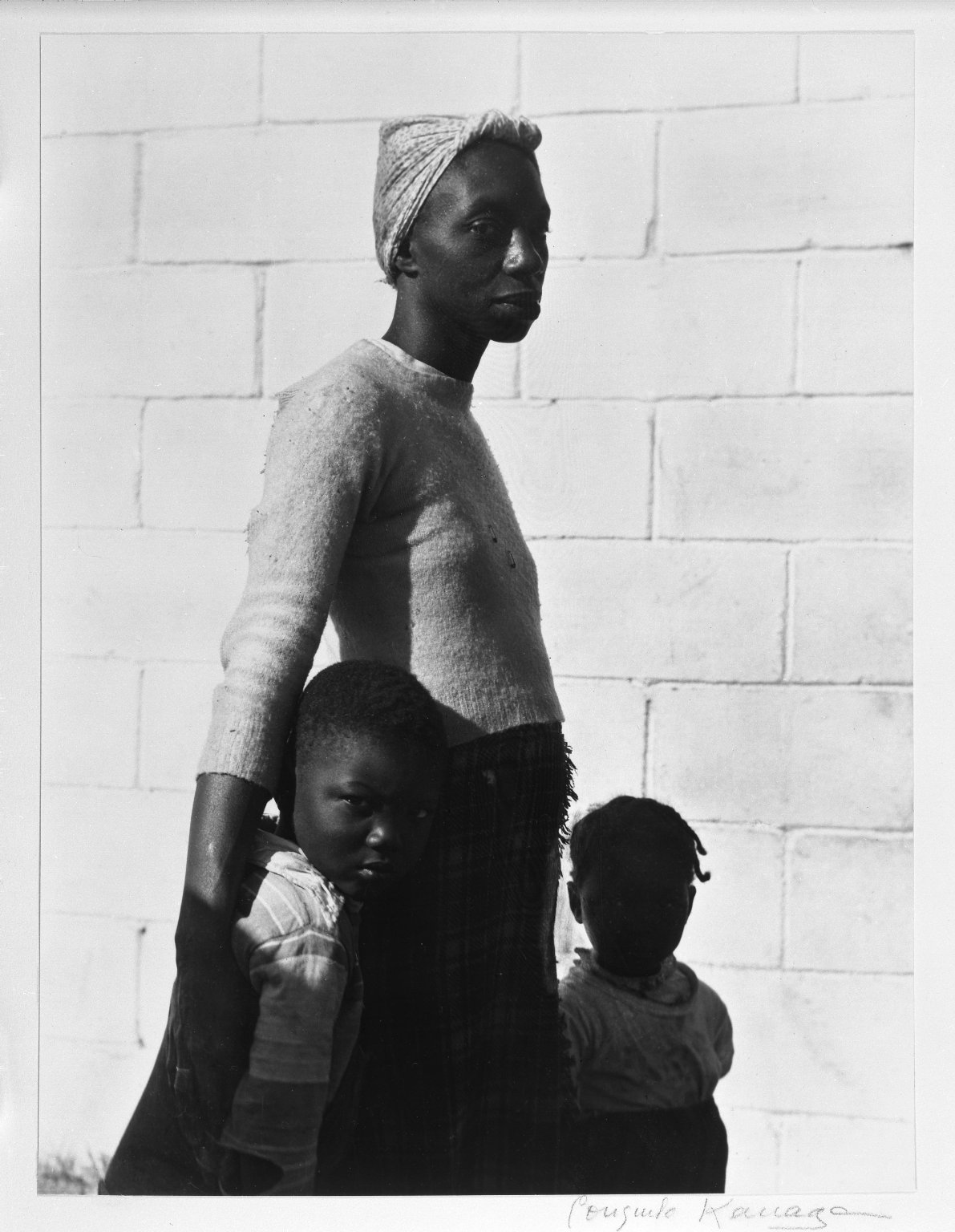
Consuelo Kanaga,[Untitled] (Mother with Children), 1950. Brooklyn Museum

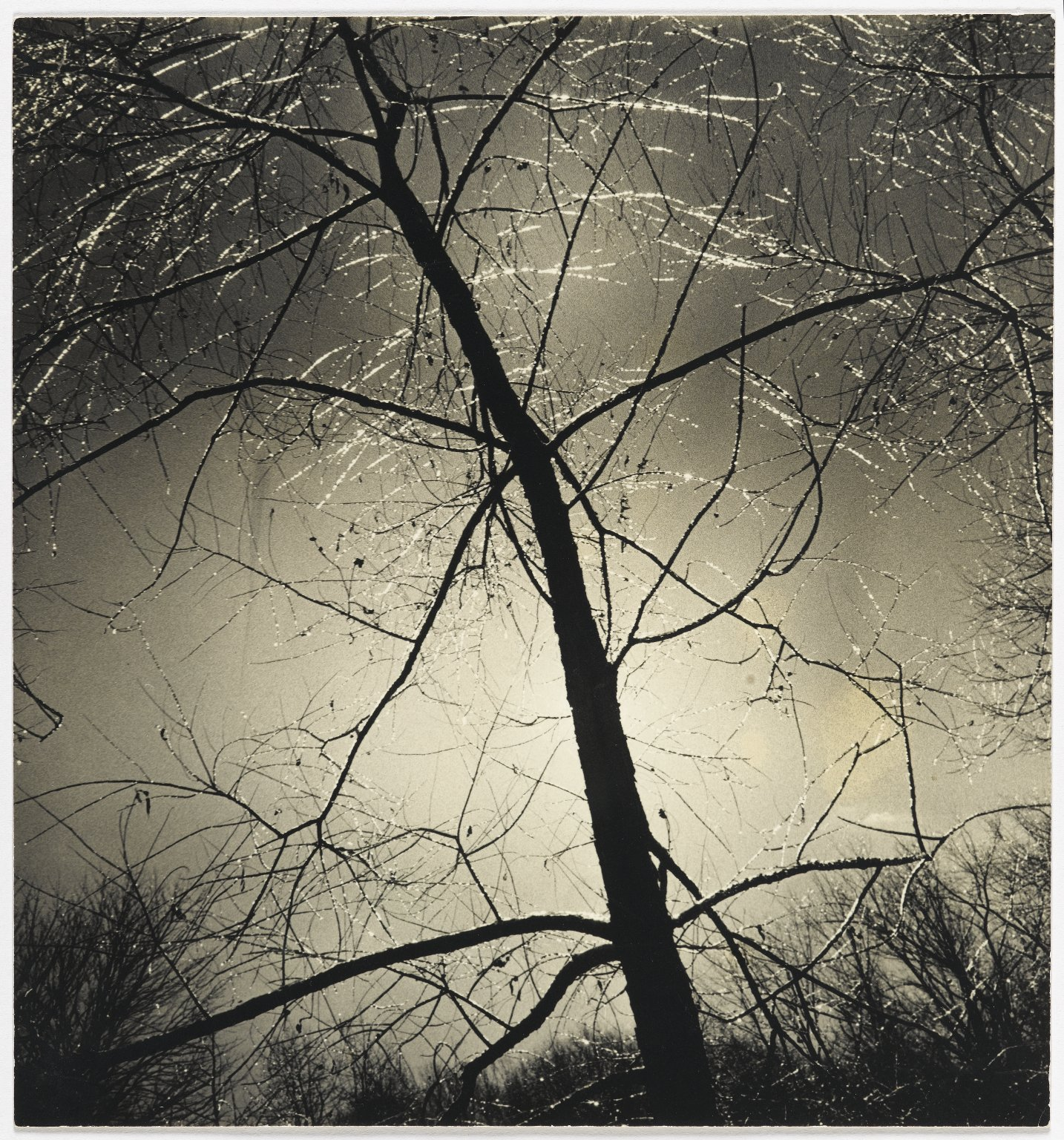
Consuelo Kanaga, Untitled (Ice Morning, Putnam Pond). Brooklyn Museum

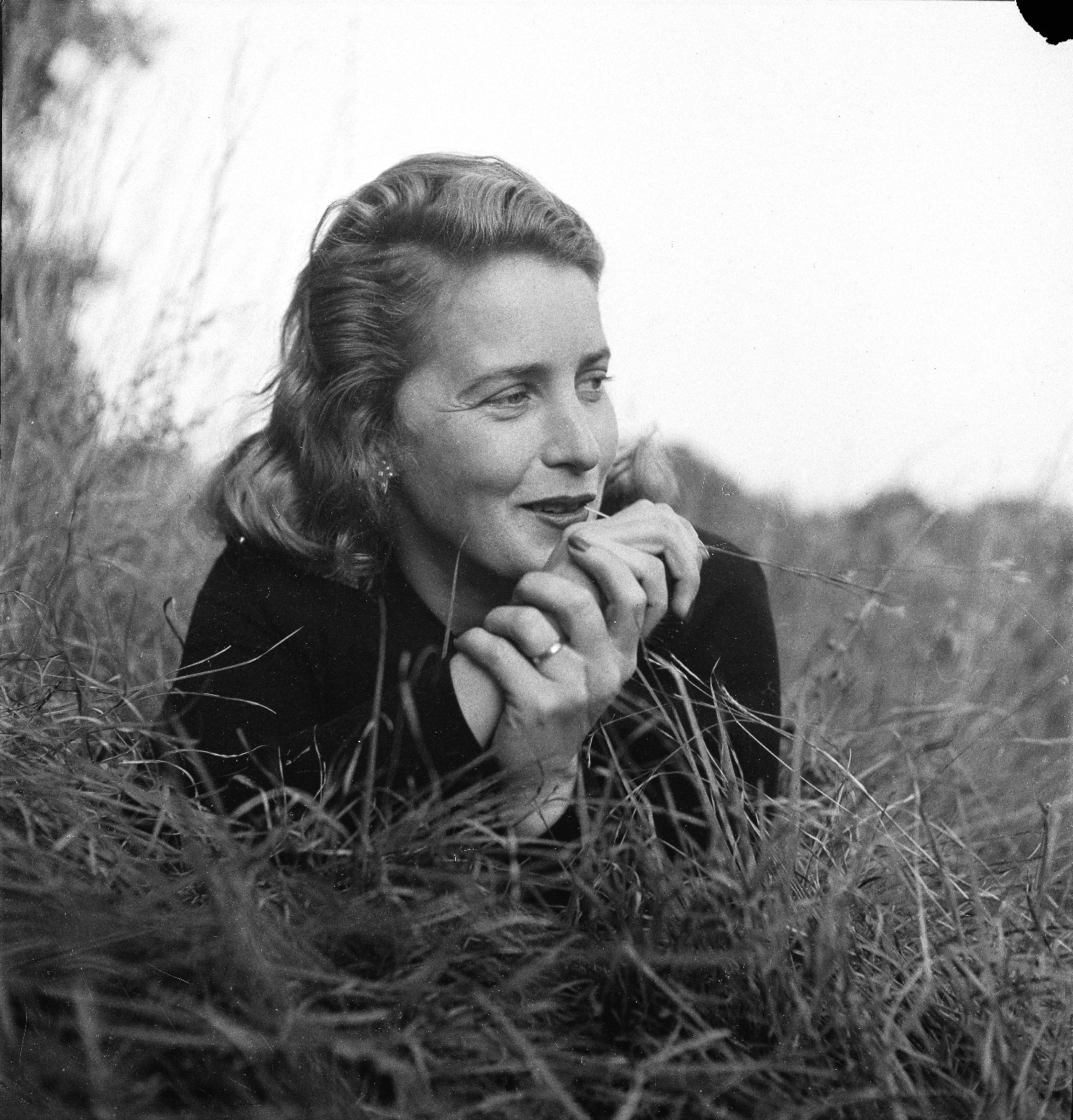
Consuelo Kanaga, Margaret Wise Brown . Brooklyn Museum

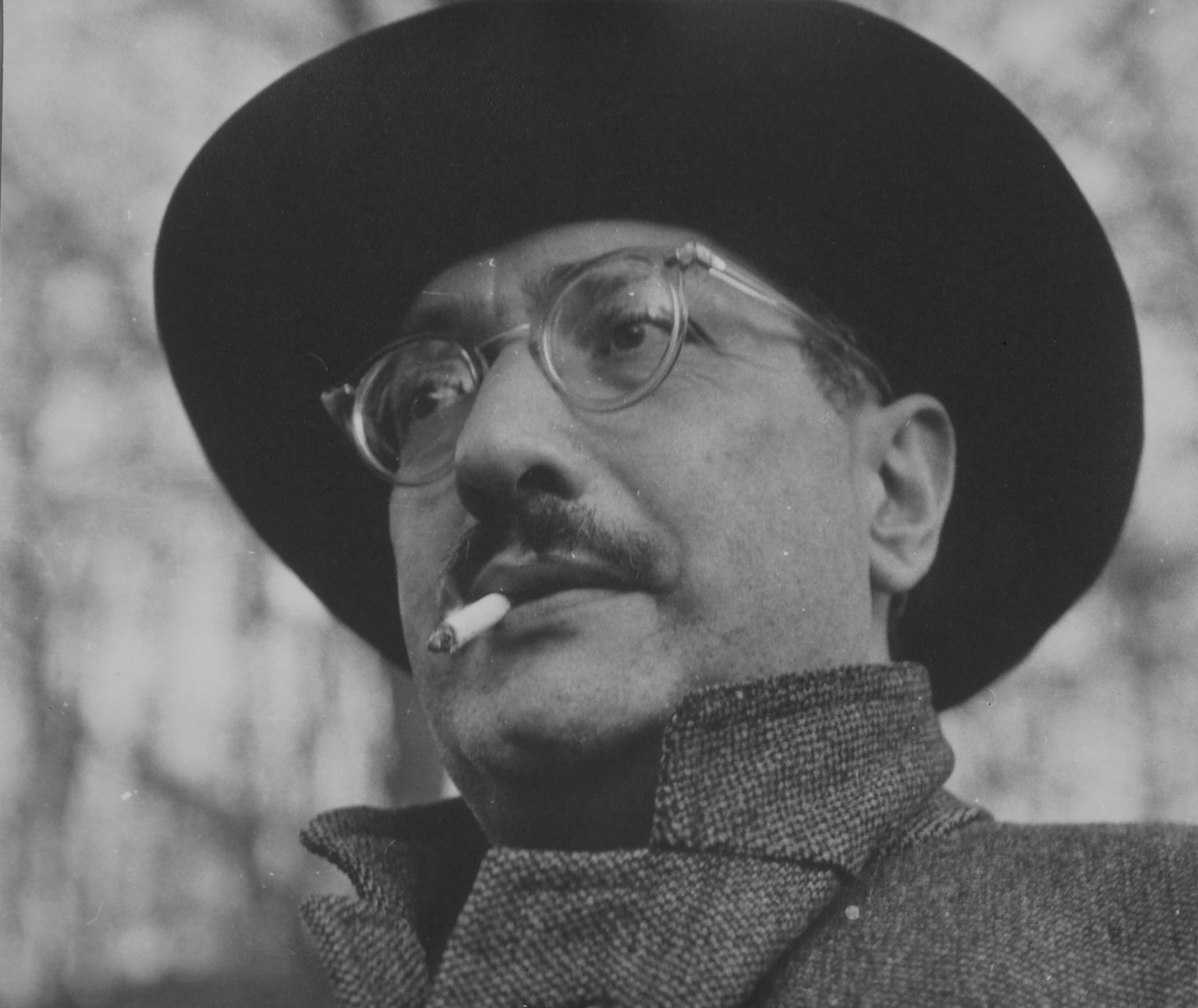
Consuelo Kanaga, Mark Rothko . Brooklyn Museum

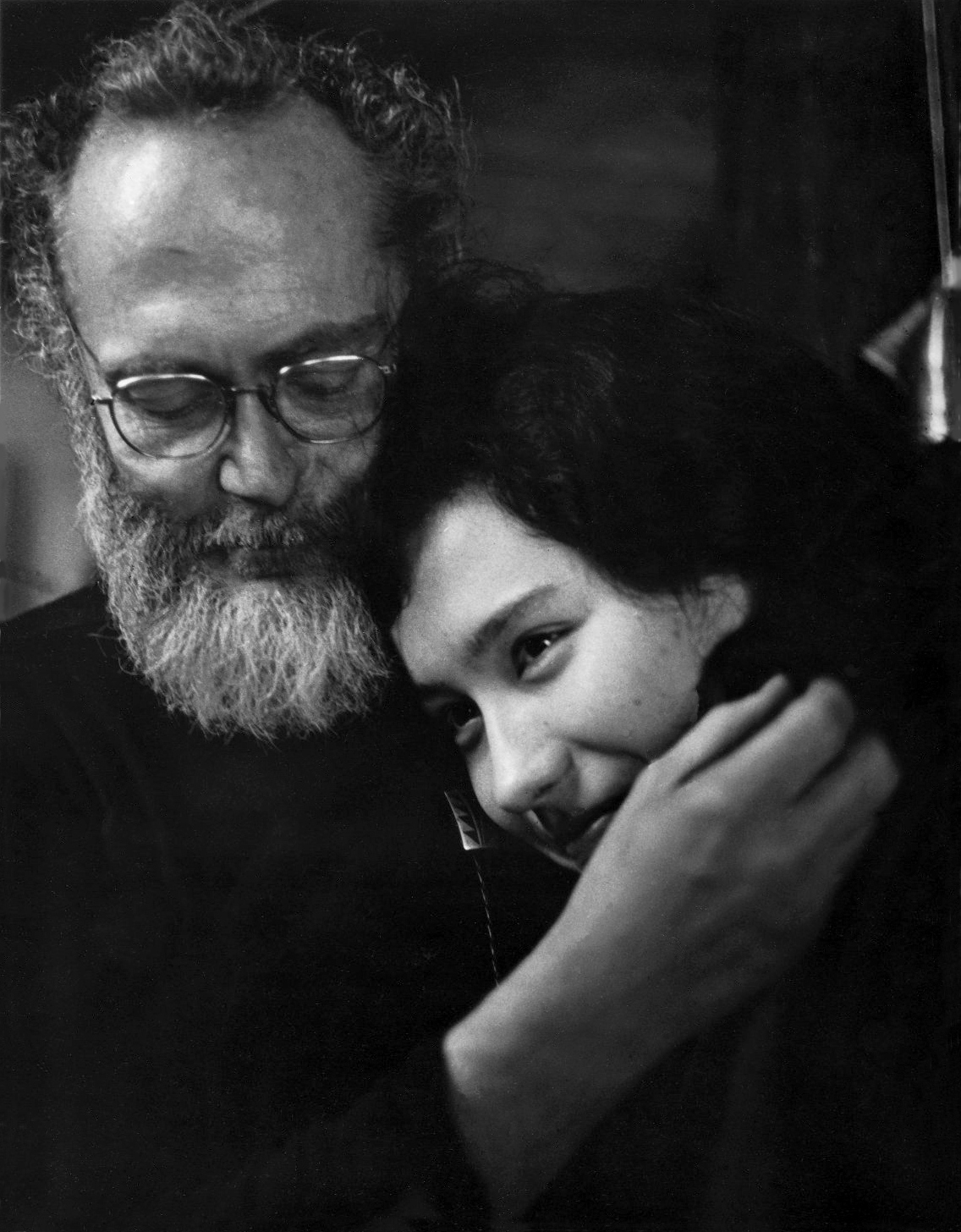
Consuelo Kanaga, Untitled (Photographer W. Eugene Smith and wife Aileen) . Brooklyn Museum
