= Alma Lavenson =

American photographer

- Born: Alma Ruth Lavenson; May 20, 1897; San Francisco, California
- Died: September 19, 1989 (aged 92)
- Known for: Photography
- Movement: Pictorialism

Lavenson was initially hesitant to adopt Edward Weston’s recommendation that she move away from her earlier pictorial style in favor of a straight photography approach (Nakasone 2013).

The legacy of the California Gold Rush informed Alma Lavenson’s photographic practice by shaping her sustained engagement with Western landscapes as sites of historical memory, economic transformation, and environmental trace.

Alma Lavenson’s early upbringing was shaped by a household that valued education and cultural exposure, as encouraged by her father, while not actively promoting her participation in paid employment.Alma Ruth Lavenson (May 20, 1897 – September 19, 1989) was an American photographer active in the 1920s and 1930s, who was born in San Francisco and died in Piedmont, California. She worked with and was a close friend of Ansel Adams, Imogen Cunningham, Edward Weston and other photographic masters of the period.

== Biography ==
Lavenson was born to Amy Furth and Albert Lavenson, who was the son of German immigrants and the co-owner of Capwell Department Store in San Francisco. Growing up, Alma Lavenson attended both public and private schools in San Francisco. In 1919 she graduated from UC Berkeley with a bachelor's degree in psychology. Her first photos were snapshots of family and friends taken with a small Kodak camera. She learned to develop and print her negatives by watching a technician at an Oakland drugstore in the early 1920s, and from the technical information she found in popular magazines such as The Camera and Camera Craft. She traded her Kodak for a 1910 3 ¼" x 4 ¼" Ensign box reflex camera, fitting it with an inexpensive, uncorrected lens for the soft-focus quality of Pictorialism promoted by those magazines, and made weekend photographic expeditions with friends to the Oakland Estuary and Marin County. On April 22, 1922 Alma and her parents left for Europe on the Olympic covering the countries of France, Italy, Holland, Switzerland, Austria, Spain, Hungary, England, Belgium, and Germany. They returned October 3, 1922. In 1923 Lavenson spent seven months in Europe and kept a travel journal that she later typed and illustrated. In 1926 she traveled to Mexico, where she met Diego Rivera.

== Recognition ==
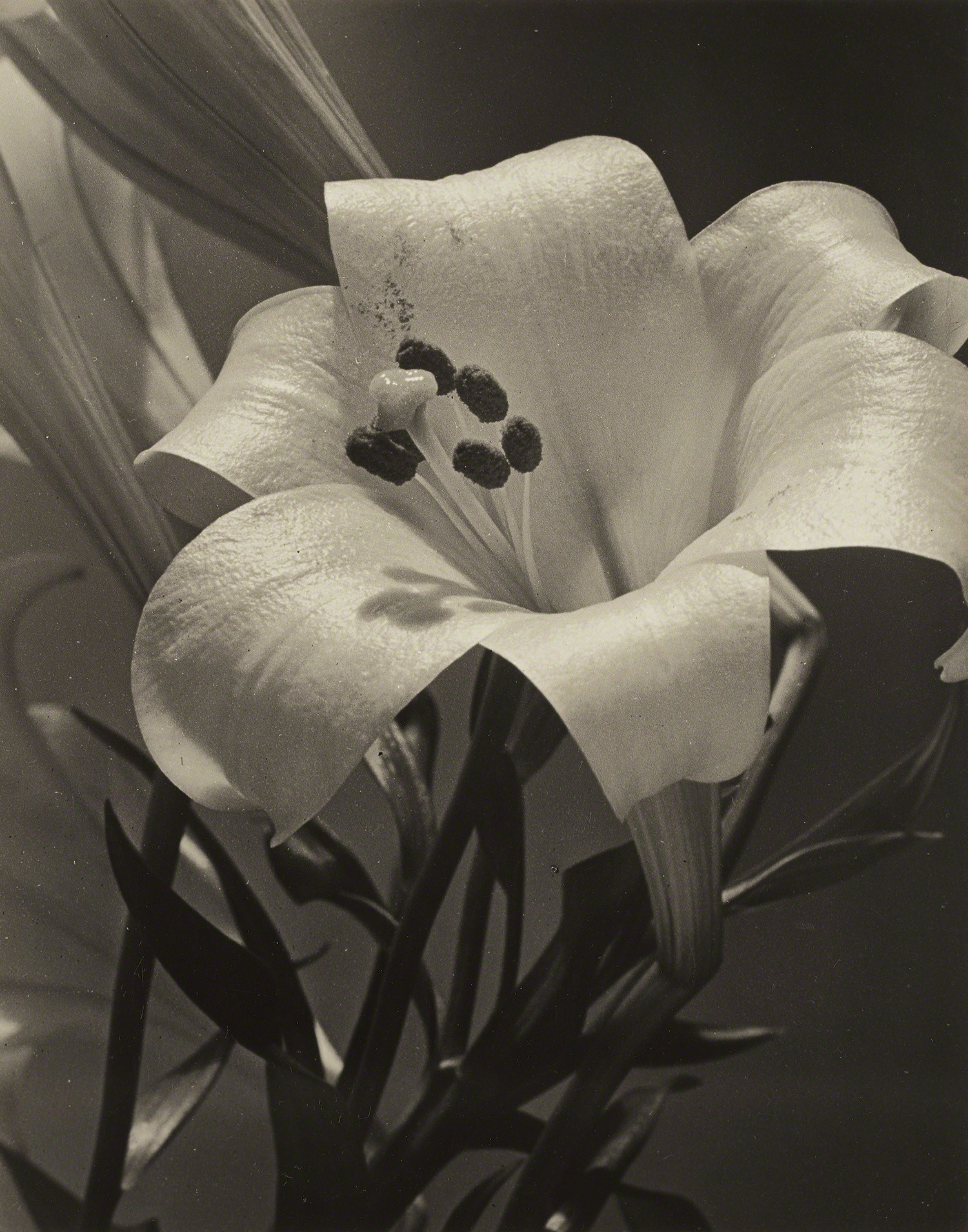
Easter Lily, exhibited at M. H. De Young Memorial Museum. November 15, 1932–December 31, 1932

Lavenson's first published photograph, an image of Zion Canyon entitled The Light Beyond, appeared on the cover of Photo-Era magazine in December 1927. In her early work she concentrated the geometric forms of structures and their placement in the landscape. She frequently exhibited in photographic salons and became a member of the influential Pictorial Photographers of America, and continued to be heavily influenced by Pictorialism.

In 1930 she was introduced to Adams, Cunningham and Weston by art collector Albert Bender. Bender also wrote Lavenson a letter of introduction to give to Edward Weston. Two years later she was invited to participate in the famous Group f/64 show at the M.H. de Young Memorial Museum, although there is some uncertainty about whether she should actually be called a "member" of Group f/64, given her association with Pictorialism. The announcement for the show at the de Young Museum listed seven photographers in Group f/64 and said "From time to time various other photographers will be asked to display their work with Group f/64. Those invited for the first showing are: Preston Holder, Consuelo Kanaga, Alma Lavenson, Brett Weston." However, in 1934 the group posted a notice in Camera Craft magazine that said "The F:64 group includes in its membership such well known names as Edward Weston, Ansel Adams, Willard Van Dyke, John Paul Edwards, Imogene [sic] Cunningham, Consuela [sic] Kanaga and several others." Lavenson was not mentioned by name in that notice, but her name is always listed as being associated with the group because of her place in the first exhibition. She was included in an exhibition of photography "by members and associates of Group f.64" held at Gallery 210, Lucas Hall, University of Missouri, St. Louis, Apr. 3-30, 1978.

In 1933 Lavenson began taking a series of photographs of abandoned buildings in the Mother Lode region of California. She continued documenting the remains of the Gold Rush period for more than two decades, and her images are now noted both for their artistic beauty and as a record of a vanishing piece of the California landscape.

== Critical reception ==
Lavenson's Masts and Funnels (1930) was admired by Edward Weston for its geometric formal qualities but he advised her to abandon her soft-focus lens for a sharper model and persuaded her to abandon her pictorial approach.". Though Weston recalled Lavenson as a photographer who "fought my criticism (self-invited) of her work a few years ago, but now has seen the light." Marisa Nakasone argues that Masts and Funnels attracted Weston because it successfully amalgamated "straight" and "pictorial" styles he regarded as mutually exclusive, because its soft focus smoothed surfaces and thus supported an abstracted rendition of a subject, supported also by the way it was printed.

== Exhibitions ==
Edward Steichen selected Lavenson's classical portrait study of a San Ildefonso Indian couple, made in 1941, for inclusion in the Museum of Modern Art exhibition The Family of Man that was visited by 9 million people on its world tour. The picture, which had won her third prize in the first Annual Salon 'Photography West of the Rockies' at the San Francisco Museum of Art in 1941, was also included in the exhibit and publication Facets of the Collection: Faces Photographed, at the San Francisco Museum of Modern Art, in 1984.

Lavenson’s Self-Portrait (with Hands) in 1996-1997 was fashioned into a huge banner and adorned the entrance to the New York Public Library’s exhibition on the history of women photographers. In 1999, the University of California hosted a major retrospective on the photography of Lavenson and Imogen Cunningham., which used the self-portrait as a central image. The self-portrait is used as a cover photograph for the book Watkins to Weston : 101 Years of California Photography (1992). A print of Lavenson’s self-portrait was sold at Christie's New York 'Photographic Masterworks 2' In 2000 for $58,750.

== Legacy ==
Alma Lavenson, though she was prolific and successful in the late 1920s and early 1930s, remained an amateur, claiming photography only as "my avocation". Once she married and had children, her creative productivity slowed. She has been a continuing influence on generations of women photographers, especially through her posthumous inclusion in exhibitions at the New York Public Library and the University of California and in publications such as Lucy Lippard's Defining eye : women photographers of the 20th century.

Lavenson's archive is housed at the Center for Creative Photography at the University of Arizona in Tucson, Arizona.

== Books about Alma Lavenson ==
- From Pictorialism to Modernism: Photographs by Alma Lavenson (San Marino: Huntington Library, 2006)
