= Camera Craft =

American monthly photography magazine

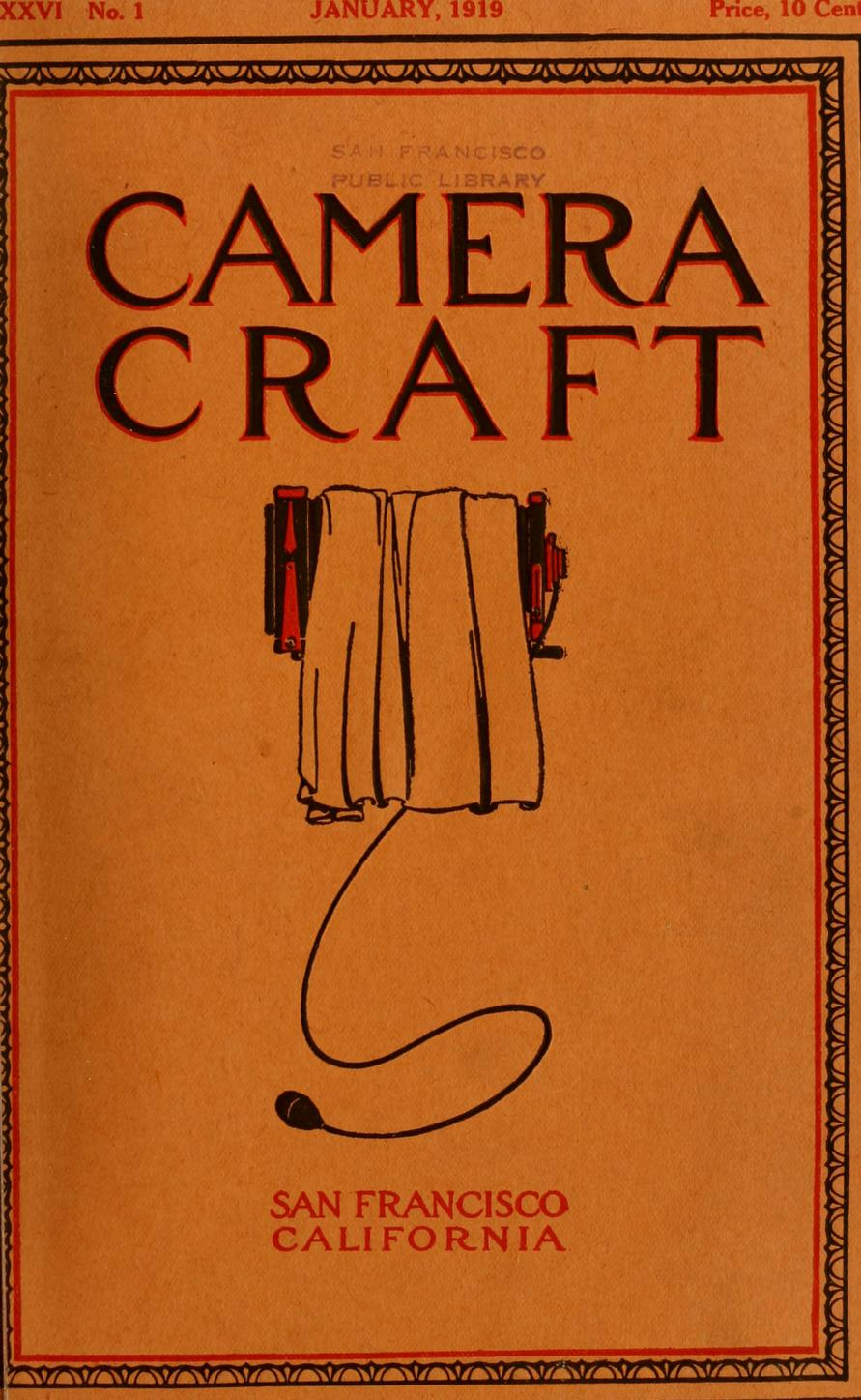
January, 1919 cover

Camera Craft was a monthly American magazine subtitled "A photographic monthly".

== History ==
San Francisco-based Camera Craft began publication with the vol. 1, no. 1, May 1900 issue and ceased publication with vol. 49, no. 3, Mar. 1942 issue, when it was absorbed by American Photography magazine.

It was devoted to practical photography illustrated with photos and each issue contained a photographic art print.

Camera Craft was the official organ of the Photographers' Association of California from November 1922 until January 1925, and subsequently of other similar organisations. It was edited by Fayette J. Clute of the Camera Craft Publishing Co. in San Francisco.

== Contributors ==
It gave space also to reports of the International Photographic Association and advertisements for cameras, camera equipment, services and supplies for the working photographer. The magazine was a significant outlet for such writers on the medium as William Mortensen who promoted Pictorialism, and Ansel Adams who argued for a Purist approach to the medium. In 1934 Adams published a series of what he announced were ‘provocative’ articles on photographic technique in Camera Craft and the next year published his first technical book, Making a Photograph (1935). Other significant contributors were Imogen Cunningham, John Paul Edwards, Willard Van Dyke and Edward Weston.
