= Consuelo =

Consuelo or Consuela may refer to:

== Arts and entertainment ==
- Consuelo (novel), an 1842–1843 novel by George Sand
- Consuela (Family Guy), a character in Family Guy
- "Consuelo", a 2002 song by Belle and Sebastian from Storytelling
- Consuelo (TV series), a 2024 Mexican television series

== Places ==
- Consuelo, Dominican Republic
- Consuelo, Queensland, Australia
- Consuelo Formation, a geological formation in Cuba

== Other uses ==
- Consuelo (name), a female given name
- Consuelo (TransMilenio), a bus station in Bogotá, Colombia
- HMS Sealark (1903), previously Consuelo, a steam yacht
