= John Paul Edwards =

American photographer (1884–1968)

John Paul Edwards (1884–1968) was an American photographer and a member of the Group f/64.

He was born in Minnesota on June 5, 1884, and moved to California in 1902. It is not known how he became interested in photography, but by the early 1920s he was a member of the Oakland Camera Club, the San Francisco Photographic Society, and the Pictorial Photographers of America. His early photographs were in the pictorialist style, but by the late 1920s he had changed to a pure straight photography style.

Sometime around 1930 he met Willard Van Dyke and Edward Weston. Within two years they had become good friends, and in 1932 Edwards was invited to be a founding member of Group f/64, along with Weston, Van Dyke, Ansel Adams, Imogen Cunningham, Sonya Noskowiak and Henry Swift. He participated in the landmark Group f/64 exhibit at the M.H. de Young Memorial Museum, showing nine images of boats, anchor chains and farm wagons.

He continued to photograph for many years after Group f/64 dissolved in 1935, but he did not gain any of the fame of many other members of the group. In 1967 he and his wife donated a collection of photographs to the Oakland Museum. He died in Oakland, California, in 1968.
