= Antonio J. Waring Jr. =

American archaeologist

Antonio Johnston Waring Jr. (August 17, 1915 – March 21, 1964) was an amateur archaeologist who made significant contributions to the study of pre-historic southeastern Georgia, United States. He is best known for his role in identifying and defining the Southeastern Ceremonial Complex, together with Preston Holder. He was a cousin of scholar Joseph Frederick Waring.

== Life and career ==
Waring was born and received his early education in Savannah, Georgia, and at St. Albans School in Washington, D.C. When he was thirteen, he first exhibited his interest in archaeology by performing an amateur excavation of the "Indian King's Tomb" on the outskirts of Savannah. In 1934, he conducted another amateur investigation of "Mound A" at a site near Eulonia, Georgia. Later that year, he entered Yale University where, at first, he majored in English. After graduating in 1938, he decided to follow in his father's footsteps and studied to be a pediatrician, a profession he would practice until 1962 despite his increasing involvement in archaeology.

=== Early work ===
The late 1930s were a pivotal point in Waring's life due to a revival of interest in Georgian archaeology sparked by the WPA excavations conducted in Macon by A. R. Kelly. This was the time when he first worked under the direction of Preston Holder, at the Deptford culture "Irene Site", near Savannah. They maintained a close working relationship for many years. During the summer of 1939, Waring continued his work in Chatham County on the "Bilbo Site", where he was in charge of excavation. This included a complete stratigraphy and proved to be the most thorough work of his career. The remains of fiber-tempered pottery were the most significant find of the excavation.

=== Middle years ===
After earning his M.D. at Yale University in 1942, he secured an internship through Johns Hopkins University, working at several hospitals in the Baltimore area. Towards the end of World War II, he joined the United States Army Medical Corps as a First Lieutenant. He later held the rank of Captain and served on the Army Typhus Commission in Egypt from 1945 to 1946, where he was able to spend some time exploring the local ruins. After returning from the war, he set up his pediatric practice in Savannah. But he couldn't stay away from archaeology for long and, in 1947, helped dig a series of test pits at the "Refuge Site" in Jasper County. In 1948, he was made an Associate in Archaeology at the University of Georgia and became a Collaborator at the Smithsonian Institution.

=== Later years ===
During the last fifteen years of his life, he focused most of his interest on the shell rings of Sapelo Island off the Georgia coast. In 1962, he retired from medicine to dedicate himself entirely to archaeology. During the Spring and Summer of that year, he was professionally employed as a field assistant to Robert S. Neitzel at the "Fatherland Site" located near Natchez, Mississippi. This was the only paid archaeological job he ever had. Later he was employed by the Georgia Historical Commission to help research and prepare an exhibit on the Civil War site at Fort McAllister near Richmond Hill.

=== Collected papers and the Waring Laboratory ===
Many of his papers, both published and unpublished, continue to be important resources for Georgia archaeologists. These papers were brought together posthumously by Lewis H. Larson and Stephen Williams and were published in 1968 through the Peabody Museum of Harvard University. During the 1980s, Waring’s wife gave the rest of her late husband’s money and personal papers to the University of West Georgia in Carrollton.

In recognition of his pioneering contributions to Georgian archaeology, the archaeological laboratory of the University of West Georgia was named in his honor in 1992. The lab serves as a repository for nearly 5,000 cubic feet of artifacts and archaeological records.

== See also ==
- Excavation (archaeology)
