= Consuelo (name) =

Consuelo is a female given name meaning "solace" or "consolation" in Spanish (a reference to Mary, mother of Jesus, Nuestra Señora del Consuelo i.e. Our Lady of Consolation).

== Notable people named Consuelo ==
- Baby Consuelo, Brazilian performer and composer
- Consuelo Acuña Iglesias (1876–1937) Galician resistance fighter in Spain
- Consuelo Castiglioni (born 1959), Swiss fashion designer and founder of Marni
- Consuelo Crespi (1928–2010), American-born Italian countess and editor of Italian Vogue
- Consuelo De Reyes (1886-1948), English dramatist and theatre director
- Consuelo de Saint-Exupéry (1901–1979), wife of novelist Antoine de Saint-Exupéry
- Consuelo Hernández (poet) (born c. 1952), Colombian/American poet and writer
- Consuelo Mack (born 1949), financial journalist
- Consuelo Moreno-López (1893–2004), a supercentenarian
- Consuelo Portela Audet (1885–1959), Cuban-born Spanish cuplé singer
- Consuelo Silva, Texas-born singer in the Mexican ranchera genre
- Consuelo Vanderbilt, Duchess of Marlborough (1877–1964), a member of the Vanderbilt family
- Consuelo Velázquez (c. 1916 – 2005), Mexican songwriter
- Consuelo Yznaga, Duchess of Manchester (1858–1909)

== Fictional characters ==
- Consuelo, mother of the protagonist in Nahuel and the Magic Book
- Consuelo, member of the ensemble in West Side Story
