= Consuelo Acuña Iglesias =

Galician anti-Franco resistance fighter (1876–1937)

Consuelo Acuña Iglesias (1876–1937) was a Galician resistance fighter in Spain. She was one of two women from her town who were executed by government forces for harboring fugitives from the Spanish fascist dictator Francisco Franco's Civic Guard.

== Biography ==
Consuelo Acuña Iglesias was born in Pontevedra, Galicia, Spain, in 1876.

In December 1936, Consuelo was hiding two fugitives: Manuel Méndez Montes, who was married to her sister Manuela Acuña Iglesias, and one of his companions, Juan Manuel Gómez Corbacho. She had put them in a shed near Consuelo's house. After the pursuing Guardsmen received a tip revealing the men's location, there was a shoot-out followed by a fire, which resulted in the death of both men.

Consuelo, her brother Ramón, and Gómez Corbacho's wife, Elvira Lodeiro González, were sleeping at Consuelo's home when the Guardsmen arrived and arrested them. The three were tried for military rebellion in a "brief sham trial" held in Pontevedra the following day, on the morning of Sunday 13 December. The prosecutor requested the death penalty for all three defendants for the crime of harboring fugitives charged with engaging in activities against the government. All three defendants were sentenced to death. Consuelo and Ramón were shot on Monte Porreiro Avenue by the Civic Guard on Monday, 14 December 1937.

Meantime, Elvira, 28, claimed she was pregnant and her sentence was postponed, but after a medical examination ruled out pregnancy, she was shot on 19 December. She left two orphans: Pilar and Manolita. While in the chapel before her death, "she asked the firing squad captain to write a letter to her good friend, the socialist Mauro Caballero, requesting that he and his wife, Petra Calleja, take care of her youngest daughter, Manolita, who was not yet four years old. Elvira wanted her eldest daughter, Pilar, who was six, to be cared for by her sister, Delia Lodeiro, who took her to Argentina. The children never saw each other again. Five days later, on December 19, Elvira was shot while seated against a tree because she could not stand."

Consuelo was 60 years old when she was killed. She left behind an unmarried son who was already a teenager, but totally dependent due to a mental disability. After being orphaned, he lived with his aunt, Manuela Acuña Iglesias, who had lost her husband in the shed fire, and her sister and her brother by firing squad. The orphaned boy also lived with Manuel's orphaned daughter, América Méndez Acuña.
