= Consuelo De Reyes =

English playwright and theatre director

Consuelo Mary Annette Bosque-y-Reyes de Meyes, generally known as Consuelo De Reyes (1886–1948) was an English dramatist and theatre director. She was director of the Little Theatre, Citizen House, Bath, Somerset and the Everyman Theatre, Hampstead.

== Life ==
Consuelo De Reyes was born 5 December 1886; the year is commonly given as 1893 in later records, however, she was baptised 24 January 1887 in Leamington Spa, the second daughter of Dr. Francisco Bosque y Reyes and Marion Holder. Her Cuban father was a student of chemistry, later professor at the university in Buenos Aires, who had married her mother in London, 1881, but appears to have spent little time with the family in England afterwards.

De Reyes studied at the University of Birmingham, writing her undergraduate dissertation on the 1911 railway strike in Birmingham. In 1912, her essay on Thomas Carlyle won a prize from the Birmingham and Midland Scottish Society.

In the 1920s, De Reyes established and directed community theatre at Citizen House in Bath, helped by both the local authority and Bristol University. On advertising for a Stage Manager, it was her future husband Peter King that responded, and the pair collaborated on theatrical activity over many years. The Citizen House Little Theatre was known for experimental and unconventional productions, including De Reyes' own plays; she was a considered a theatrical pioneer and authority, who trained countless youths in the Bath area.

De Reyes wrote a sequence of plays about Queen Victoria, dealing with the queen's childhood, marriage, motherhood and widowhood. The fourth of these plays was disallowed by the Lord Chamberlain, who summonsed her for two performances in October 1935.

In the 1930s De Reyes also bought the Everyman Theatre, Hampstead. With her husband, she commissioned an architect to build a space which could be used as both a theatre and a cinema. The building was completed in 1936, but burnt down four weeks later. The pair rebuilt it and managed it as a combined theatre and cinema until 1948, when it became a fulltime cinema.

She died of a heart-attack on 29 May 1948 on Caldey Island, where she had a house.

== Works ==
=== Plays ===
- The Wedding Ring of England: a pageant of English kingship. London, 1937.
- The Young Princess: a play of the youth of Queen Victoria. London: S. French, 1938. French's acting edition, no. 1217.
- Vickie: a play of the girlhood of Queen Victoria. 1938. London: S. French, 1938. French's acting edition, no. 1218.
- Vickie and Albert: a play of the married life of Queen Victoria and the Prince Consort. London: S. French, 1938. French's acting edition, no. 1219.
- The widow of Windsor: a play of the widowhood of Queen Victoria. London: S. French, 1938. French's acting edition, no. 1220.
- Victoria Regina.
- The Friend of a Queen.
- The Chief of Kensington.
- This Year of Grace.

=== Other ===
- Essay on Thomas Carlyle. Birmingham: University of Birmingham, 1912.
- A Little Theatre and Its Organization.
