= Henry Swift (photographer) =

American photographer (1891–1962)

Henry Swift (1891, Berkeley, California – 1962, Berkeley, California) was an American photographer and member of the famous Group f/64.

In the early 1920s he met photographer Edward Weston by chance in Carmel, California and began making photographs as a hobby. He was earning a living as a stockbroker, a career he continued throughout his life. In 1932 he became a founding member of Group f/64 along with Weston, Ansel Adams, Imogen Cunningham and several others. Later that year he showed nine prints (the same number as Weston) in the landmark Group f/64 show at the M.H. de Young Memorial Museum in San Francisco. While participating in the group, he was also able to collect many of the other photographers prints because of earnings as a stockbroker. Cunningham recalls that Swift bought all of the prints from the first show, which, if he paid the listed price for each photo, would have cost him a grand total of $845 for 80 prints.

After Group f/64 dissolved in 1935, Swift's interest in photography waned. He is not known to have exhibited again. When he died in 1962, his widow Florence Swift assembled his collection of photographs from members of Group f/64, sought additional donations from some of the original members of the group, and donated the entire collection to the San Francisco Museum of Modern Art.
