= Preston Holder =

American archaeologist (1907–1980)

Preston Holder (September 10, 1907, Wabash, Indiana – June 3, 1980, Lincoln, Nebraska) was an American archaeologist and photographer.

In 1930 he entered the University of California, Berkeley, to study anthropology. While there he met photographer Willard Van Dyke after writing an assignment about his photographs. Van Dyke introduced him to Ansel Adams, Edward Weston, Imogen Cunningham and other photographers around the San Francisco area, and he soon was photographing in a style similar to theirs. In 1932 Holder was present at a gathering at Van Dyke's house in Berkeley in which this group discussed their intention to unite in promotion of their artistic vision, They were searching for a name for their small group, and Holder suggested "US 256", which was then the commonly used Uniform System designation for a very small aperture stop on a camera lens. Adams thought the name would be confusing to the public, and he suggested "f/64", which was a corresponding aperture setting for the focal system that was gaining popularity. From this discussion they formed the now famous Group f/64. Later that year Holder participated in their first Group f/64 show at the M.H. de Young Memorial Museum, showing four prints.

While photographing part-time, Holder continued his education at Berkeley and received his B.A. in 1935. There is almost nothing written about his photographic career after he graduated. By 1940 he seemed to have drifted away from his photography interests and dedicated himself to becoming a full-time archeologist.

In 1951, he earned his Ph.D. from Columbia University. With the help of fellow archaeologist Antonio J. Waring, Jr., Preston Holder began excavations at the Irene Mound site in September 1937. Located on the outskirts of Savannah, Georgia, the mound took nearly two years to excavate. Another excavation Holder conducted at the Saint Simon's airport on Saint Simons Island, Georgia revealed a large Late Archaic and Woodland period settlement. The excavation was mentioned briefly in Antonio Waring's, The Waring Papers. In 1938, Holder also wrote Excavations on Saint Simons Island and Vicinity. He left Georgia in January 1938.

His work in this area was additionally published as a journal article, and discussed in later publications, In 1951, he earned his Ph.D. from Columbia University.

He died of cancer on June 3, 1980, at the age of 72 in Lincoln, Nebraska.

== External links section ==
https://archives.nebraska.edu/repositories/8/resources/3307
