= Willard Van Dyke =

American filmmaker and photographer (1906-1986)

- Van Dyke in 1975
- Born: December 5, 1906
- Died: January 23, 1986 (aged 79)
- Known for: Photography, Film Director
- Awards: George Eastman Award

Willard Ames Van Dyke (December 5, 1906 – January 23, 1986) was an American filmmaker, photographer, arts administrator, teacher, and former director of the film department at the Museum of Modern Art.

== Early life ==
Van Dyke went to the University of California, Berkeley, circa 1927 dropping out for a time to avoid taking an ROTC course, left in 1929 and did not graduate.

"I had been playing around with a camera and developing my own pictures since I was 12 years of age"

== Photography ==
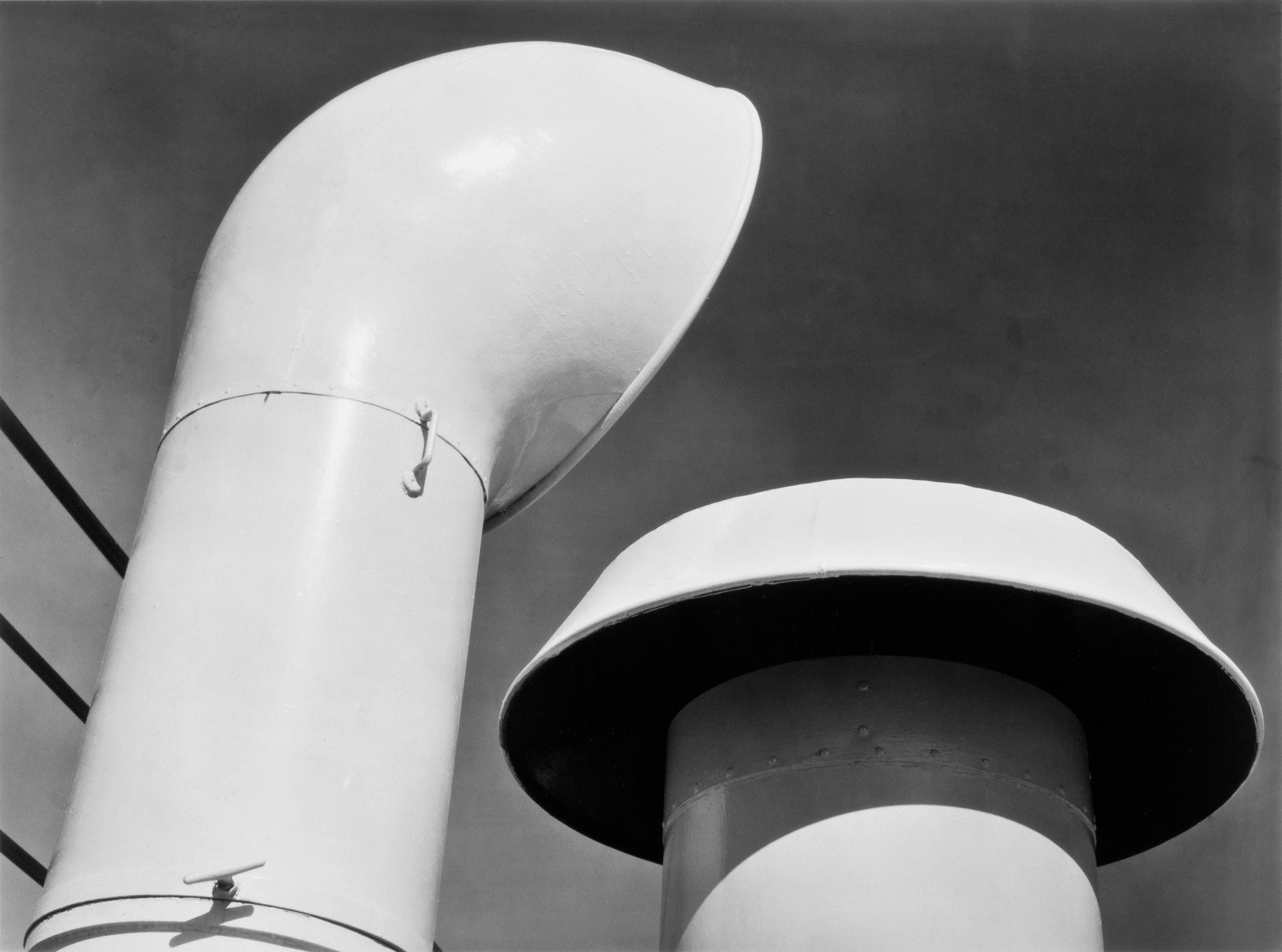
Funnels, exhibited at the M. H. De Young Memorial Museum. November 15, 1932–December 31, 1932

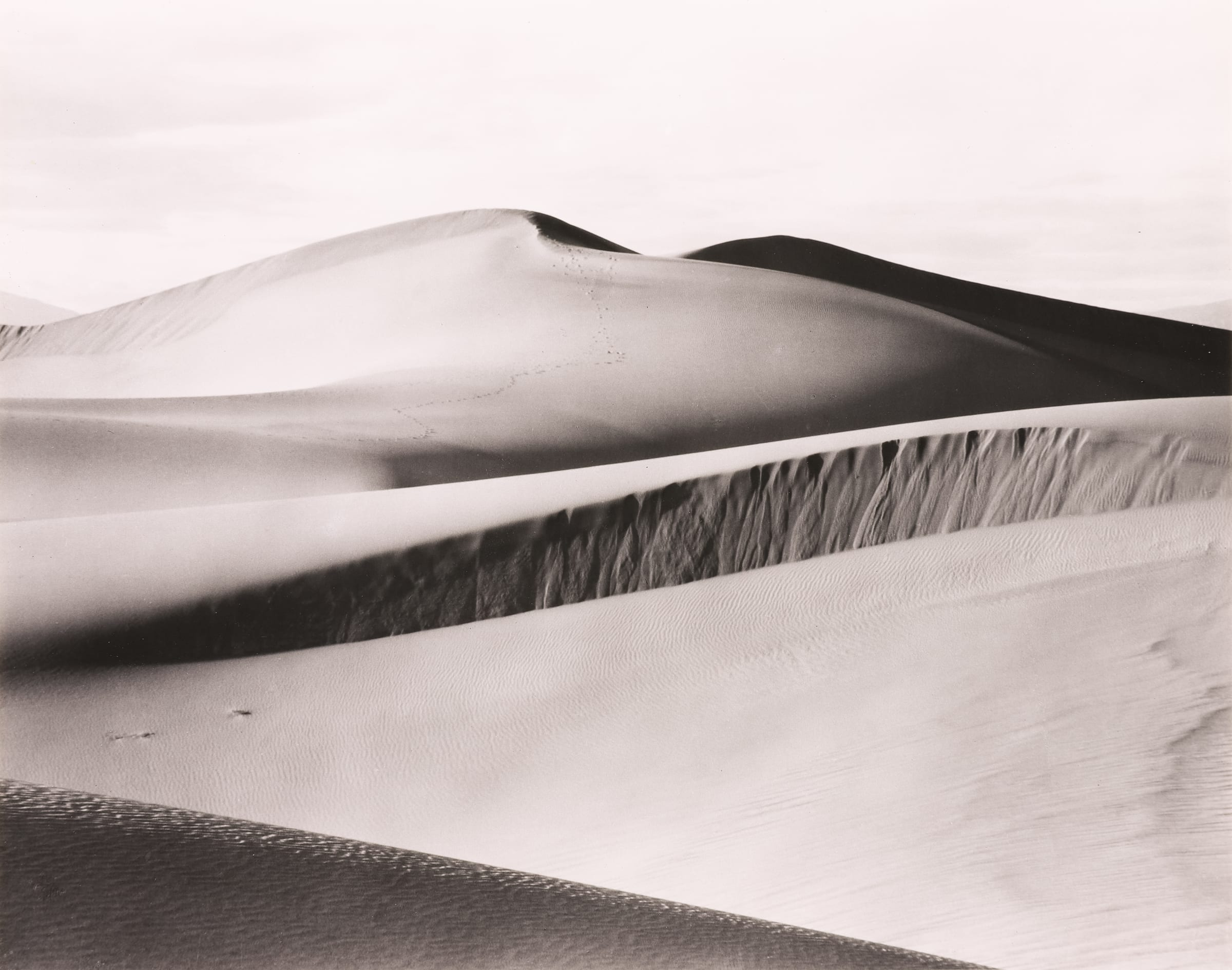
Death Valley Dunes, exhibited at the M. H. De Young Memorial Museum. November 15, 1932–December 31, 1932

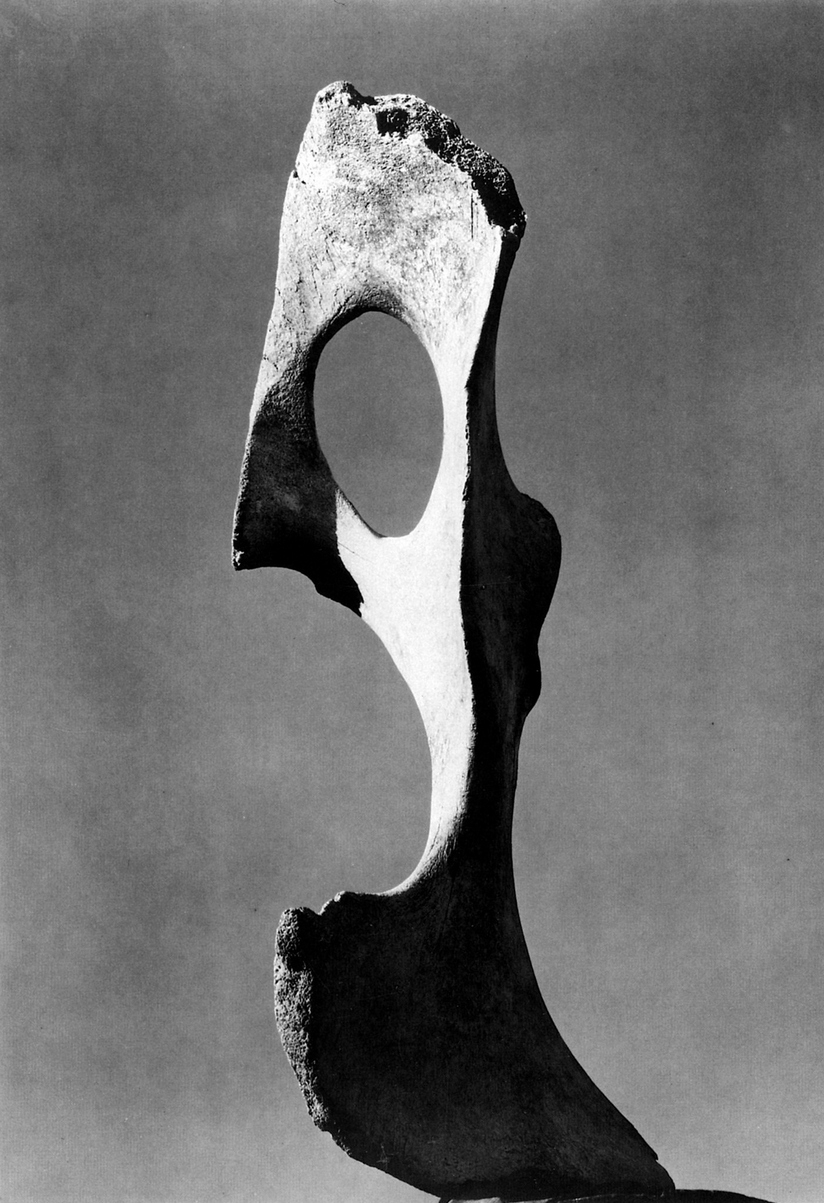
Bone and Sky, exhibited at the M. H. De Young Memorial Museum. November 15, 1932–December 31, 1932

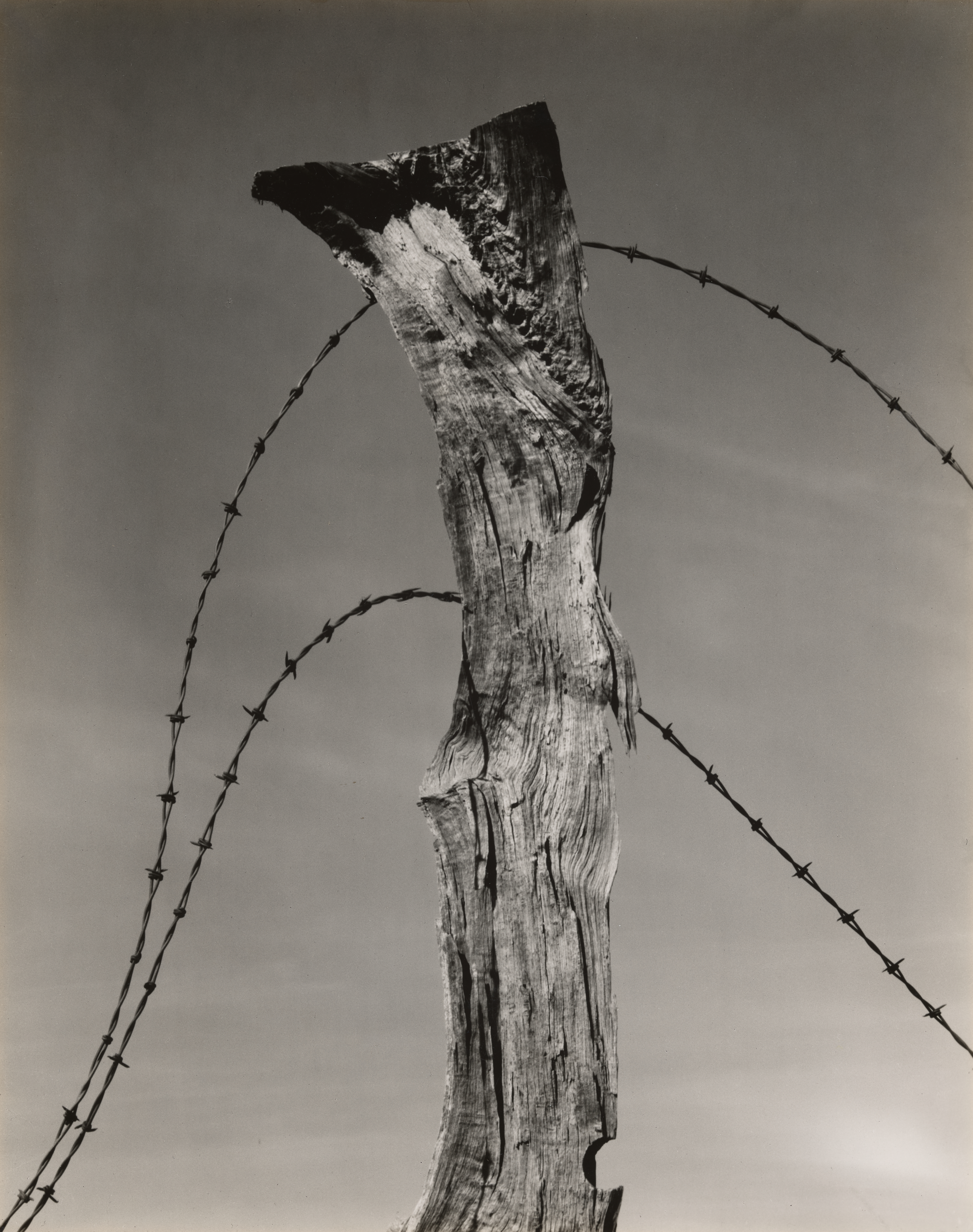
Barbed Wire and Fence Post, exhibited at the M. H. De Young Memorial Museum. November 15, 1932–December 31, 1932

In 1928, he went to see a photographic exhibition at the Palace of the Legion of Honor in San Francisco, where he not only saw some Edward Weston’s work but met him. It was a life-changing experience.

In 1928, he apprenticed with Edward Weston and by 1932 co-founded Group f/64, with Imogen Cunningham, Ansel Adams, and Weston. The group’s approach emphasized both sharp and deep focus (sometimes called straight photography) in contrast with the painterly approach of many other photographers.

In April 1934, the DeYoung Museum exhibited 70 photos taken by Van Dyke of Public Works of Art Project artworks.

Van Dyke soon abandoned still photography, saying in a 1982 documentary based on his life that he did not want to compete with his closest friend, Weston.

== Film ==
Van Dyke's photographs were marked by a tendency to address social issues, as in portraits of migrant workers, as well as purely formal subjects. This interest apparently led him to documentary films. "The effects of the Depression were very disturbing to me, and I felt anxious to promote change," he once said to an interviewer. "I was young and impatient, and felt that the documentary film would more effectively communicate issues to more people than would still photography." (New York Times)

In 1935, Van Dyke moved to New York City and began making documentary films. He served as a cameraman on The River (1938) directed by Pare Lorentz. He also worked with NYKINO, the film organization that involved Paul Strand, Ralph Steiner, and Henri Cartier-Bresson. His film The City (1939) with Steiner, ran for two years at the New York World's Fair of 1939.

During World War II Van Dyke was Chief of Technical Production for the Office of War Information's Overseas Motion Picture Board and Liaison Officer between OWI and Hollywood script writers. In 1945, Van Dyke was commissioned to make an official film called San Francisco about the conference that created the United Nations Organization.

From 1946 to 1965, he was a producer/director of films for television and in the field of adult education. He directed films for the CBS Television programs, The Twentieth Century and The Twenty-First Century. In 1948, Van Dyke made the documentary film The Photographer about Edward Weston. In 1960, he was nominated with Shirley Clarke and Irving Jacoby for an Academy Award for the short documentary film Skyscraper (1959).

The Academy Film Archive has preserved a few of Willard Van Dyke's films, including The 21st Century/The Shape of Films To Come, Journey Into Medicine, and The American Scene Number 6: Steel Town.

== Arts administrator and teacher ==
Van Dyke was director of the Department of Film at the Museum of Modern Art from 1965 to 1974, overseeing the expansion of the department's archives and exhibitions, and he started two programs for showing the work of avant-garde and documentary film makers. He introduced the work of modern and fellow documentary photographers and was credited with enhancing photography's position as a serious art form. While director of the Department of Film, Mr. Van Dyke served as president of the Robert Flaherty International Film Seminars, as chairman of the faculty at the first cinema session of the Salzburg Seminar in American Studies, and as vice-president of the International Federation of Film Archives (FIAF). From 1976 he was a trustee and chairman of the Film Advisory Committee of the American Federation of Arts.

After leaving the Museum of Modern Art in 1977, he became a professor at the State University of New York at Purchase, and founded its film program and remained there until 1981. In 1978, Van Dyke was awarded the George Eastman Award, given by George Eastman House for distinguished contribution to the art of film.

== Personal life ==
Van Dyke died, 23 January 1986, in Jackson, Tennessee, of a heart attack, driving from his home in Santa Fe, N.M. to Cambridge, Massachusetts, where he had recently been named laureate artist in residence at Harvard. He and his wife stopped for the night when he became ill, was taken to a hospital, and died. He was 79 years old.

Van Dyke was survived by his wife, Barbara (née Millikin), a daughter, Alison, three sons, Peter, Murray, and Neil, and grandchildren.

== Film credits ==
Director

- 1934 Hands (short)
- 1939 The City (documentary short)
- 1940 Design for Education (documentary)
- 1940 Sarah Lawrence
- 1940 The Children Must Learn (documentary)
- 1940 Valley Town (documentary)
- 1941 Tall Tales (documentary short)
- 1941 To Hear Your Banjo Play
- 1942 The Bridge
- 1943 Oswego
- 1943 Steeltown
- 1944 Pacific Northwest
- 1945 San Francisco (official film, founding of United Nations)
- 1946 Journey Into Medicine (documentary)
- 1947 The Photographer (documentary short) about Edward Weston
- 1947 To Hear Your Banjo Play (short)
- 1949 Mount Vernon
- 1949 This Charming Couple (short)
- 1950 Choosing for Happiness (short)
- 1950 Year of Change
- 1952 New York University, directed by Willard Van Dyke with cinematographer Richard Leacock
- 1953 Broken Appointment (short)
- 1953 American Frontier (short)
- 1953 Working and Playing to Health
- 1954 Cabos Blancos(With Angel Rivera)
- 1954 Excursion House
- 1954 Recollections of Boyhood
- 1954 There Is a Season
- 1957 Life of the Molds
- 1958 Mountains of the Moon
- 1958 Skyscraper (short, co-directed with Shirley Clarke)
- 1958 Tiger Hunt in Assam
- 1959 Land of White Alice (restored by the National Film Preservation Foundation)
- 1959 The Procession
- 1960 Ireland: The Tear and the Smile
- 1960 Sweden
- 1961-1965 The Twentieth Century (TV series documentary – 5 episodes)
- 1962 Harvest
- 1962 So That Men Are Free
- 1963 Depressed Area
- 1963 So That Men Are Free (documentary)
- 1964 Frontiers of News
- 1964 Rice (With Wheaton Galentine)
- 1965 Frontline Camera 1935-1965
- 1965 Pop Buell: Hoosier Farmer in Laos
- 1965 Taming the Mekong
- 1965 The Farmer: Feast of Famine (With Roger Barlow)
- 1968 Shape of Films to Come

Cinematographer

- 1938 The River (documentary short)
- 1943 This Is Tomorrow (documentary short)
- 1954 The Lonely Night (documentary)

Producer

- 1947 To Hear Your Banjo Play (short) (co-producer)
- 1948 The Photographer (documentary short) (producer)
- 1953 American Frontier (short) (producer)
- 1954 The Lonely Night (documentary) (producer)
- 1976 Nanook of the North (documentary) (supervisor: International Film Seminars)

== Preservation ==
Tall Tales was preserved and restored by the UCLA Film & Television Archive from a 35mm nitrate print. Restoration funding was provided by a grant from the GRAMMY Museum®. The restoration had its world premiere at the 2024 UCLA Festival of Preservation.

== Sources ==
- Calmes, Leslie Squyres (text) 1992 The Letters between Edward Weston & Willard Van Dyke. Archive 30. The Center for Creative Photography, Tucson, 67 pp., a few black-and-white illustrations, 8½x11".
- Enyeart, James L. 2008 Willard Van Dyke: Changing the World Through Photography and Film. Albuquerque, University of New Mexico Press.
- Rothschild, Amalie (1981). "Conversations With Willard Van Dyke". New Day Films. Archived from the original on 2017-02-06.
- Film Society of Lincoln Center FILMOGRAPHY OF WILLARD VAN DYKE. Film Comment, vol. 3, no. 2, 1965, pp. 35–37. JSTOR
- Van Dyke, Willard; Engle, Harrison (1965). "THIRTY YEARS OF SOCIAL INQUIRY: An Interview With Willard Van Dyke". Film Comment. 3 (2). Film Society of Lincoln Center: 24–35. ISSN 0015-119X. JSTOR 26747071.
- van Dyke, Willard (1 July 1946). "The Interpretive Camera in Documentary Films". Hollywood Quarterly. 1 (4): 405–409. doi:10.2307/1209501. JSTOR 1209501.
