= Elizabeth Partridge =

American writer (born 1951)

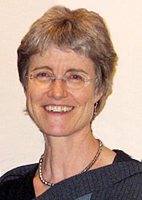
Partridge in 2009

Elizabeth Partridge (born September 1, 1951) is an American writer, the author of more than a dozen books from young-adult nonfiction to picture books to photography books. Her books include Marching for Freedom (2009, Viking), as well the biographies John Lennon: All I Want Is the Truth (Viking, 2005), This Land Was Made for You and Me: The Life and Music of Woody Guthrie (Viking, 2002), and Restless Spirit: The Life and Work of Dorothea Lange (Viking, 1999).

Partridge is the daughter of photographer Rondal Partridge and the granddaughter of photographer Imogen Cunningham and etcher Roi Partridge.

Partridge has been a National Book Award finalist, an ALA Michael L. Printz Award runner-up, and twice a Boston Globe–Horn Book Award runner-up. She has won the Los Angeles Times Book Prize, the SCBWI Golden Kite Award, and the Jane Addams Children's Book Award. In 2023, she won the Sibert Medal for her book Seen and Unseen: What Dorothea Lange, Toyo Miyatake, and Ansel Adams’s Photographs Reveal About the Japanese American Incarceration.

Partridge is on the faculty of the Vermont College of Fine Arts in the MFA in Writing for Children & Young Adults. She chaired the National Book Award Committee for Young People's Literature in 2007 and has served on the Los Angeles Times Book Prize Committee and the SCBWI Golden Kite Award committee.

== Selected works ==
=== Young adult nonfiction ===
Restless Spirit: the Life and Work of Dorothea Lange (Viking, 1998)
This Land Was Made For You and Me: The Life and Songs of Woody Guthrie (Viking, 2002)
John Lennon: All I Want Is the Truth (Viking, 2005)
Marching for Freedom: Walk Together, Children, and Don't You Grow Weary (Viking 2009)
Boots on the Ground: America's War in Vietnam (Viking, 2018)
Seen and Unseen: What Dorothea Lange, Toyo Miyatake, and Ansel Adams’s Photographs Reveal About the Japanese American Incarceration (Chronicle Books, 2022)

=== Adult nonfiction ===
Dorothea Lange: A Visual Life (Smithsonian University Press, 1993)
Quizzical Eye: The Photography of Rondal Partridge (Heyday Press, 2003)

=== Novels ===
Clara and the Hoodoo Man. (Dutton Children's Books, 1996)
Dogtag Summer. (Bloomsbury Children's Books, 2011)

=== Picture books ===
Pigs Eggs, Illustrated by Martha Weston. (Globe Books, 2000)
Oranges on Golden Mountain, Illustrated by Aki Sogabi. (Dutton Children's Books, 2002)
Moon Glowing, Illustrated by Joan Paley.(Dutton Children's Books, 2002)
Kogi's Mysterious Journey, Illustrated by Aki Sogabi. (Dutton Children's Books, 2003)
Whistling, Illustrated by Anna Grossnickle Hines. (Harper Collins, 2003)
Big Cat Pepper, Illustrated by Lauren Castille. (Bloomsbury Children's Books, 2009)

=== Essays and short stories ===
"Looking for America," Open Your Eyes: Extraordinary Experiences in Faraway Places. (Viking, 2003)
"This Was America, 1960," John F. Kennedy: The Inaugural Address. (Viking, 2010)

== Awards and honors ==
Marching for Freedom: Walk Together Children and Don't You Grow Weary

- Boston Globe-Horn Book Award runner-up
- Los Angeles Times Book Prize for Young Adult Literature
- Jane Addams Children's Book Award
- School Library Journal's Battle of the Books
- 2011Tayshas Reading List (2011)
- Int'l Reading Association Teachers’ Choice Children's Book Council 2010:
- Notable Social Studies Trade Books
- International Reading Association 2010 Notable Books for a Global Society
- Capitol Choices Noteworthy Books for Children
- ALA Notable Children's Book
- ALA Best Books for Young Adults
- Booklist Editors' Choice: Books for Youth
- Horn Book Fanfare Choice
- Kirkus Reviews Best Children and YA Books of 2009
- Publishers Weekly Best Children's Books of 2009
- School Library Journal Best Books of the Year (2009)
- Booklist Top Ten Black History Books for Youth
- New York Public Library's Children's Books 100 Titles for Reading and Sharing
- California Book Award: Young Adult Finalist
- Pennsylvania School Librarians Association YA Top Forty (2009)

John Lennon: All I Want is the Truth

- Michael L. Printz Award Honor
- ALA Best Books for Young Adults
- School Library Journal Best Books
- Booklist Editor's Choice
- Horn Book Fanfare
- BCCB Blue Ribbon
- Kirkus Best Books

This Land Was Made for You and Me: The Life and Songs of Woody Guthrie

- National Book Award finalist
- Boston Globe–Horn Book Award for Nonfiction runner-up
- SCBWI Golden Kite Award, Nonfiction
- ALA Top Ten Best Books for Young Adults
- ALA Notable Book
- School Library Journal Best Books
- Booklist Editor's Choice
- Horn Book Fanfare
- BCCB Blue Ribbon
- Publishers Weekly Best Books of the Year
- New York Public Library's 100 Titles for Reading and Sharing

Restless Spirit: The Life and Work of Dorothea Lange

- Jane Addams Children's Honor Book
- SCBWI Golden Kite Award, Nonfiction honor book
- ALA Best Books for Young Adults
- ALA Notable Book
- Booklist Editor's Choice
- Bay Area Book Reviewers Award

Kogi's Mysterious Journey

- CBC-Notable Social Studies Trade Books for Young Readers
- New York Public Library's Children's Books: 100 Titles for Reading and Sharing 2003

Clara and the Hoodoo Man

- Women's National Book Association, Judy Lopez Memorial honor book

Seen and Unseen: What Dorothea Lange, Toyo Miyatake, and Ansel Adams’s Photographs Reveal About the Japanese American Incarceration

- Sibert Medal
