= John Butler (artist) =

American artist (1890–1976)

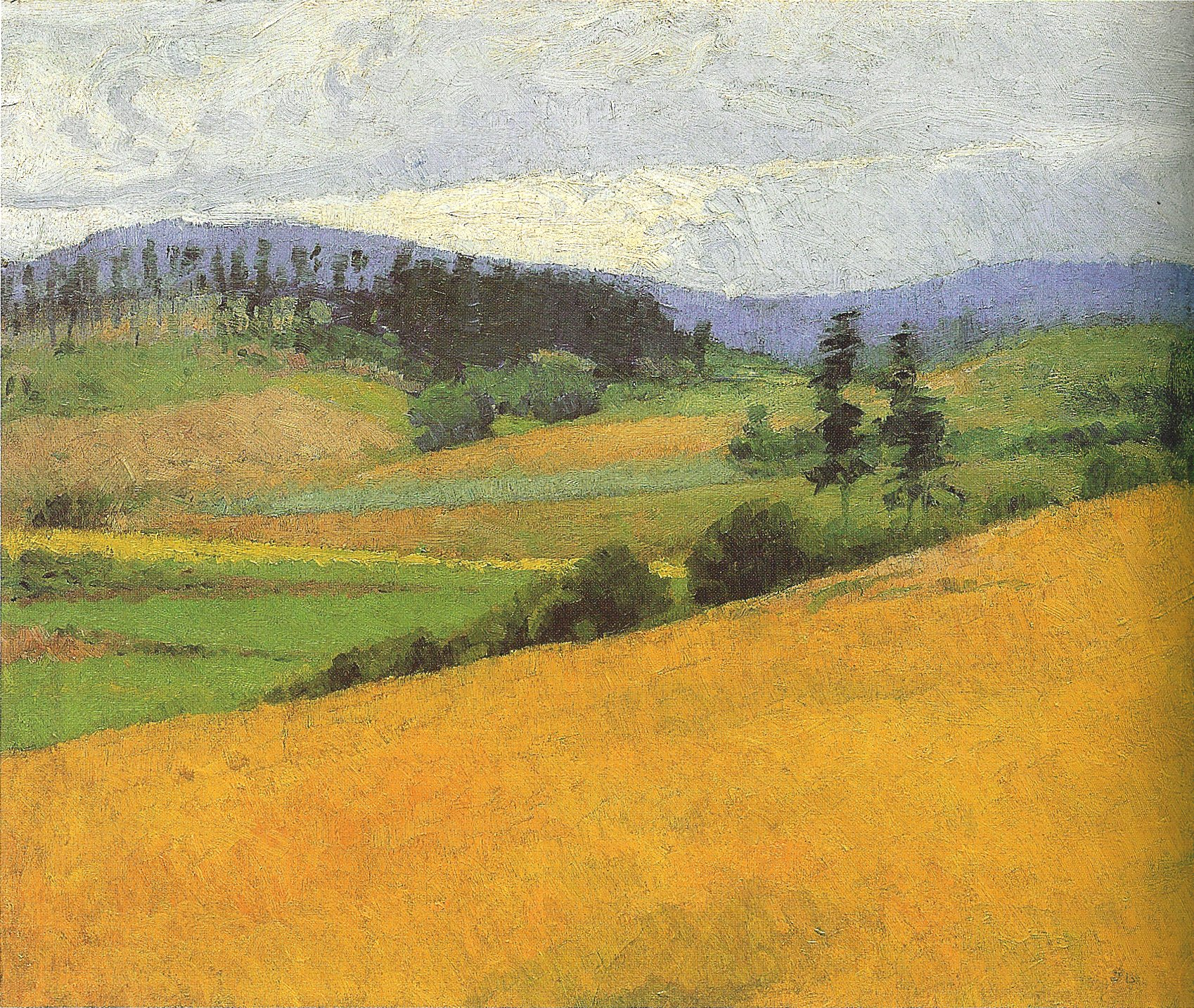
Untitled landscape by Butler, c. 1915. Oil on board.

John Davidson Butler (1890–1976), was an American artist from Seattle, Washington. He worked primarily as a painter, but later also as a printmaker and ceramicist.

Butler was one of three Seattle artists who worked together under the name "The Triad." The others were etcher Roi Partridge and miniaturist Clare Shepard Shisler. Also in their circle were photographer Imogen Cunningham (who used Butler and the others extensively as models, and later married Partridge) and painters Mabel Lisle Ducasse and Yasushi Tanaka.

As a youth, Butler studied in Seattle under Carlotta Blaurock, who had been, in turn, a student of James McNeill Whistler. He also studied with Ella Shepard Bush (founder in 1894 of the Seattle Art School) and other local artists. Some of his early work was exhibited at Seattle's 1909 Alaska–Yukon–Pacific Exposition. In 1910, he followed Partridge to New York, where two of Butler's watercolors were shown at the American Watercolor Society exhibition at the National Academy of Design. The two traveled on to Europe where Butler studied at the Colorossi Academy in Paris and also studied in Germany.

Returning to America, he continued his studies under William Merritt Chase, at a summer 1914 class in Carmel, California. There, he shared a first prize from Chase with a fellow Seattle artist, Louise Crow. Upon returning home, he had a successful solo exhibition at the Seattle Fine Arts Society, which was a predecessor to the Seattle Art Museum. He offered private classes, and also became the first teacher of painting at the Cornish School, later Cornish College of the Arts. His students included Kenneth Callahan and Thomas Handforth.

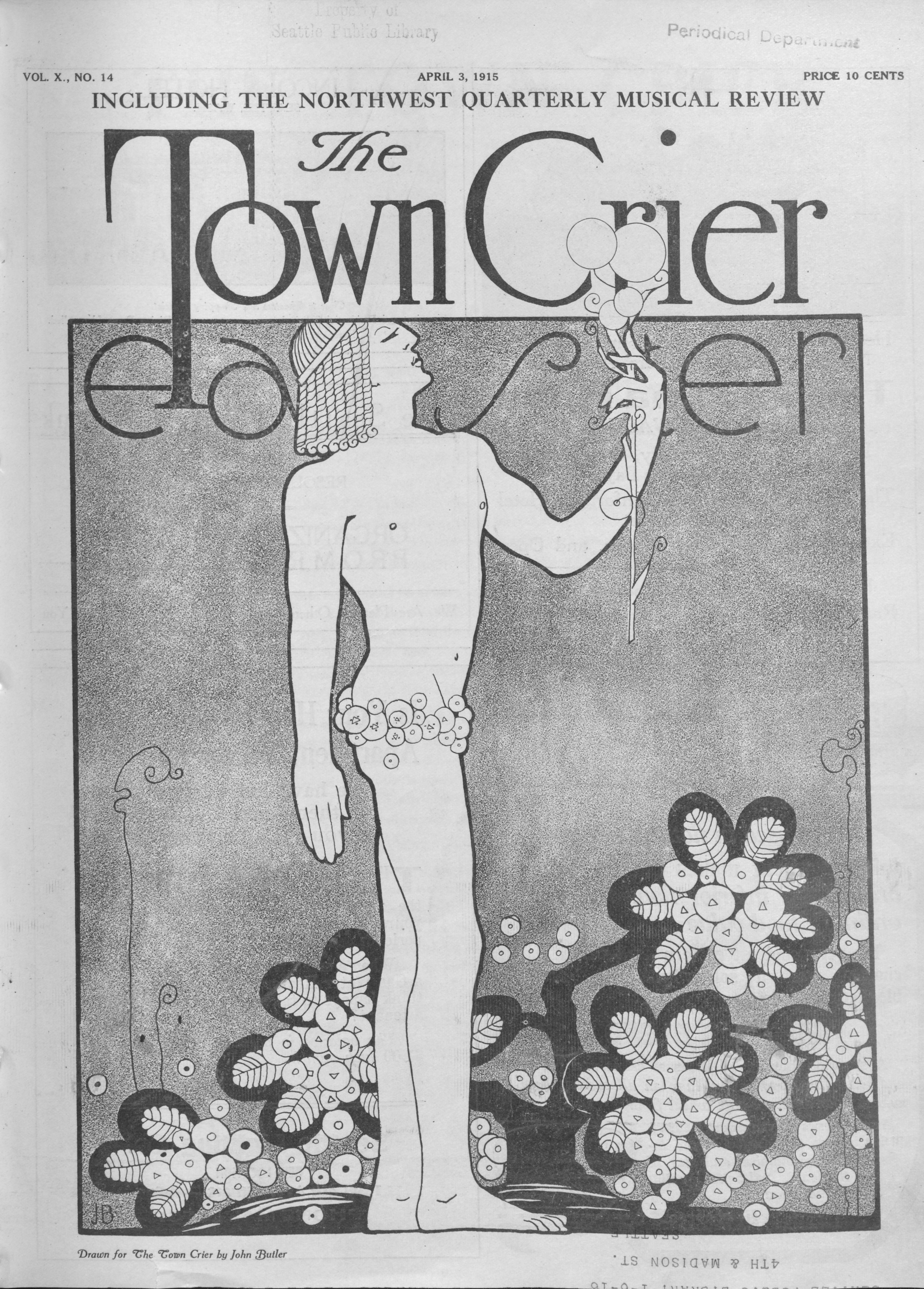
Butler's illustration on the cover of the Easter 1915 edition of Seattle magazine The Town Crier.

He served in the military in World War I; after the war, he remained primarily in Europe until 1932, periodically sending works for exhibition in Seattle. While in Europe he began making woodcuts and blockprints, which were exhibited at the Northwest Printmakers Society in Seattle, among other venues. Returning to the U.S., he taught at a variety of institutions in Seattle, Minneapolis, Virginia, and Pennsylvania. He received a Bronze Medal in a national figure composition competition at Washington, D.C.'s Corcoran Gallery in 1938. In the early 1940s, he began working in ceramics.

Butler produced numerous murals in Seattle and elsewhere and illustrations for local Seattle publications. He also wrote articles and worked with arts organizations to promote art in Seattle.

Butler rarely signed his works, so it is not always readily apparent what works are his. Some of the early works when he was associated with "The Triad" bear a triangular cipher. He sometimes signed his work with his initials, "J.B."

The Seattle Art Museum's collection includes a painting by Butler, depicting a couple resting on the banks of Lake Washington on a Summer Day.
