= Portrait of Imogen =

1988 film

- Directed by: Meg Partridge
- Produced by: Nancy Hale; Meg Partridge
- Starring: Imogen Cunningham
- Cinematography: Meg Partridge; Craig Withrow
- Edited by: Claude Ibrahimoff
- Distributed by: New Day Films
- Release date: 1988
- Running time: 30 minutes
- Country: United States
- Language: English

Portrait of Imogen is a 1988 American short documentary film about American photographer Imogen Cunningham, directed by Meg Partridge, daughter of Cunningham's son Rondal Partridge. It was nominated for an Academy Award for Best Documentary Short.
