= Claudia Kunin =

American artist, photographer, and author

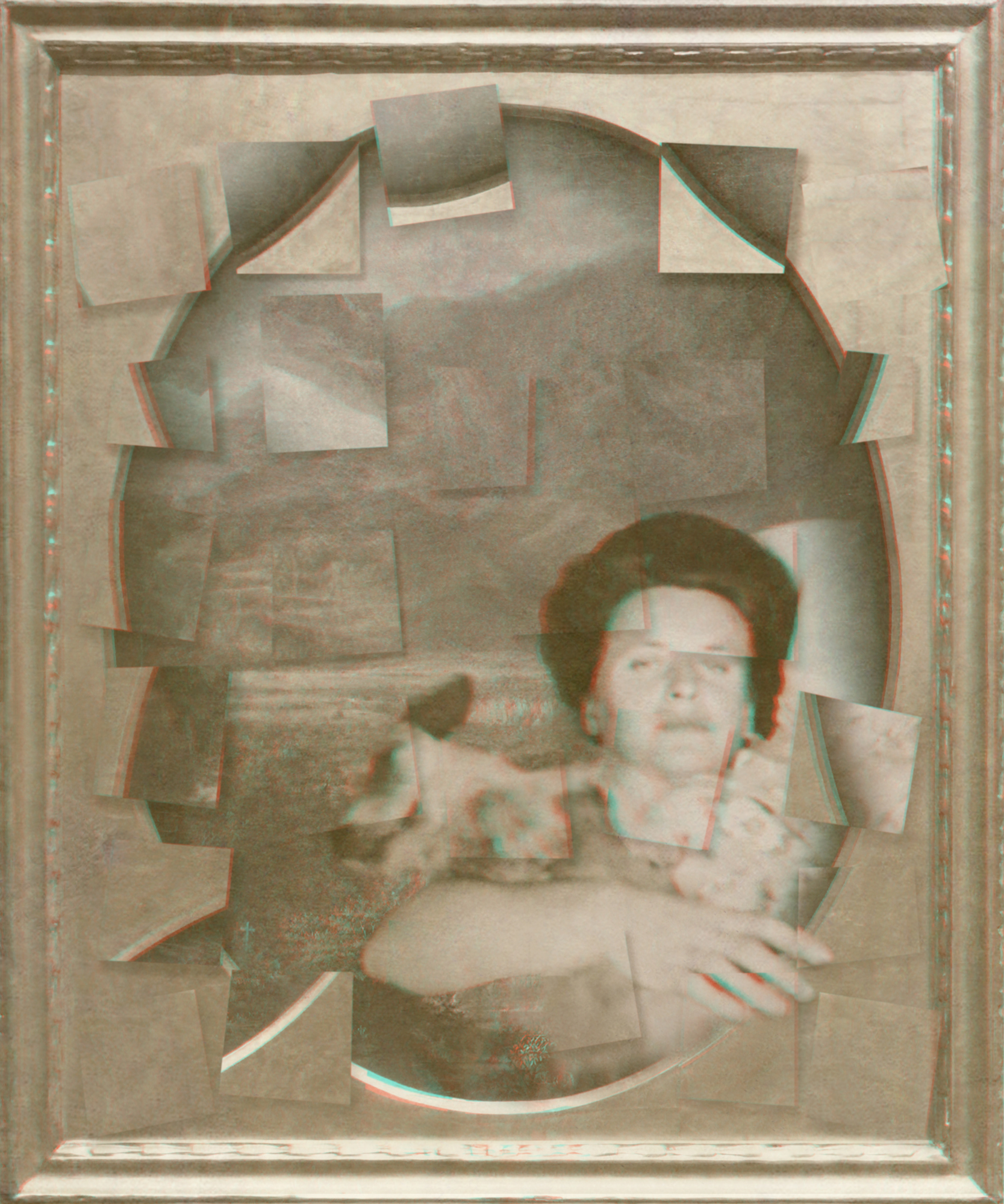
- Artist's image, titled Deconstructing Mommy, subtitled "The puzzle of figuring out my mother's past"
- Born: 1954 (age 71–72); Los Angeles, California
- Education: Bachelor of science
- Alma mater: University of Oregon
- Website: www.claudiakunin.com

Claudia Kunin (/ˌkjuːnən/, born 1954) is an American artist and photographer known uniquely for animating photographs to make time-based narrative tales. Kunin has forged an artistic field of her own making. Using digital means, she restarts the clock on moments frozen in time by the camera. Creating animations using daguerreotypes, her own family archives, as well as montages she has made from her own work, she spans a temporal arc that synthesizes the history of photography from its bare beginnings to what is possible in the 21st century. In many cases, using anaglyphic 3D glasses enhances the third dimensionality of the imagery.

== Career ==
Kunin's professional life began with a degree in psychology. She quickly became disillusioned with this, however, and began working as a commercial photographer for companies such as AT&T, American Express, Wells Fargo Bank, Concorde Pictures, Pfizer Pharmaceuticals, Ford Motor Co., Sprint Communications, Rolling Stone, Martha Stewart, Wm. Morrison and Penguin Books. At the age of 50, she retired from commercial photography to pursue work as a fine artist. Using her collection of previous photographic work as well as family photographs, she develops them into stills, and later, animated images. She counts Imogen Cunningham as a source of inspiration.

Her experimental film Spectre of Memory won the award for best short in its category at the BeFilm Underground Film Festival in 2014.

Her work received an honorable mention at the Worldwide Photography Gala Awards in the Digital Manipulation and Collage Category Series.

Claudia took first place in Fine Art Prix de la Photographie Paris for her still series "3D Family Ghost Stories". For her work animating original images by Nadar, "Nadar Trio" took second place in video art from the International Photo Awards. In 2010, Kunin's work was in a juried selected show at the Museum of Photographic Arts entitled "State of Mind". Her image Angel is currently held by the National Portrait Gallery, a part of the Smithsonian Institution.
