= Roi Partridge =

American printmaker, teacher (1888–1984)

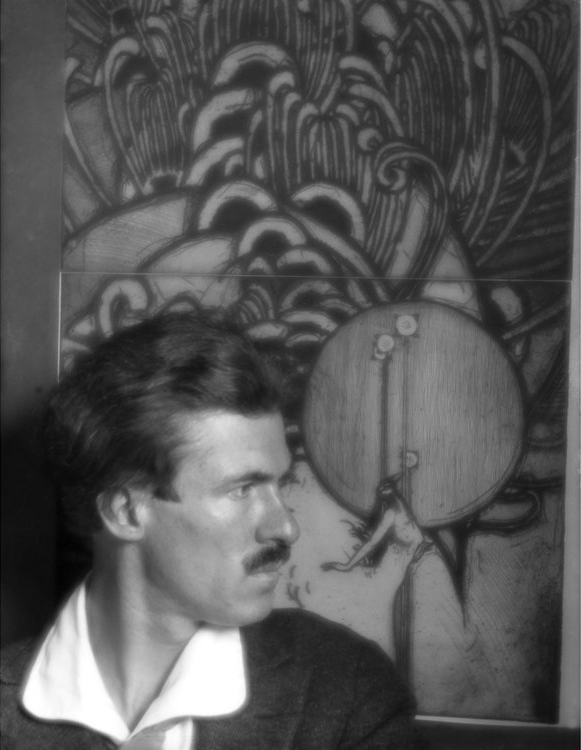
- Partridge in 1915
- Born: George Roy Partridge; October 14, 1888; Centralia, Washington, U.S.
- Died: January 25, 1984 (aged 95); Walnut Creek, California, U.S.
- Education: National Academy of Design
- Occupations: Printmaker, professor, gallery director
- Spouse(s): Imogen Cunningham (m. 1915–1934; div.); Marion Lyman; May Fisher
- Children: 3, including Rondal Partridge

George Roy Partridge (October 14, 1888 – January 25, 1984), also known professionally as Roi Partridge, was an American printmaker and professor. He taught at Mills College in Oakland, California in many years.

== Life and career ==
George Roy Partridge was born in Centralia, Washington. At age four he moved with his family to Seattle, where his father worked as a typesetter and later owned the local newspaper.

In Seattle, Partridge was one of three Seattle artists who worked together under the name "The Triad". The others were painter John Butler and miniaturist Clare Shepard Shisler. Also in their circle were photographer—and Partridge's future wife—Imogen Cunningham, and painters Mabel Lisle Ducasse and Yasushi Tanaka.

In 1909 the budding artist traveled with Butler to New York City for one year of art study at the National Academy of Design and then studied etching in Munich. His next three years were spent in Paris where he worked as a printmaker under the mentorship of Bertha Jaques. When the German troops were approaching the French capital in 1914, Roi returned to Seattle.

When 44 of his etchings were shown at the Panama–Pacific International Exposition in 1915, he decided to make California his home. After moving to San Francisco in 1917, he began teaching at Mills College in Oakland, California in 1920 and became the first director of the school's art gallery.

His marriage to photographer Imogen Cunningham in 1915, ended in divorce in 1934. They had three sons, including photographer Rondal Partridge. His second wife, artist Marion Lyman, died of cancer in 1940; his third wife was May Fisher.

== Late life and death ==
Partridge took a leave of absence from Mills College in 1946, continued etching until 1952, and retired in 1954. His last years were spent in Rossmoor in Walnut Creek, California, where he died on January 25, 1984.

== Collections ==
The Amarillo Museum of Art (Amarillo, Texas), the Bancroft Library (University of California), the British Museum, the Brooklyn Museum, the Fine Arts Museums of San Francisco, the Frye Art Museum (Seattle, Washington), the Grinnell College Museum of Art, the Honolulu Museum of Art, Mills College, the Mobile Museum of Art (Mobile, Alabama), the Monterey Museum of Art (Monterey, California), the New York Public Library, the Oakland Museum, the Portland Art Museum, the San Diego Museum of Art (San Diego, California), the Seattle Art Museum, the Smithsonian American Art Museum (Washington, D.C.), the University of Michigan Museum of Art (Ann Arbor, Michigan) and the Weisman Art Museum (University of Minnesota) are among the public collections holding works by Partridge.

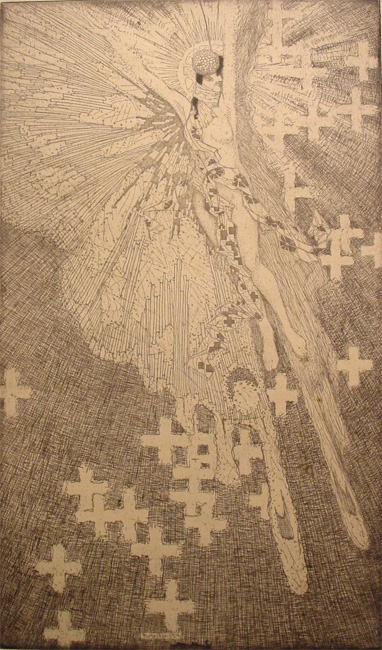
White Butterfly, 1912

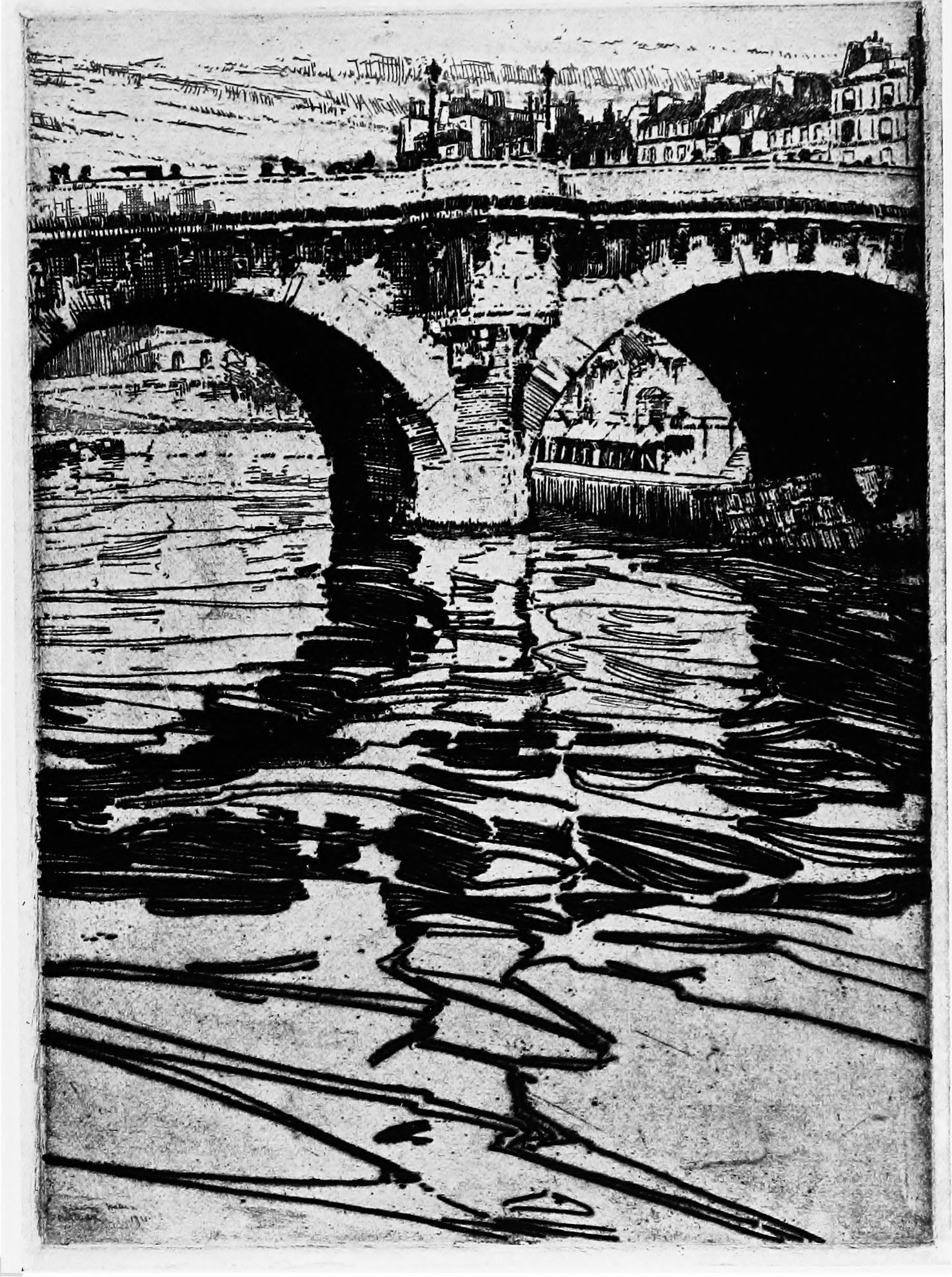
Dancing Water, 1913

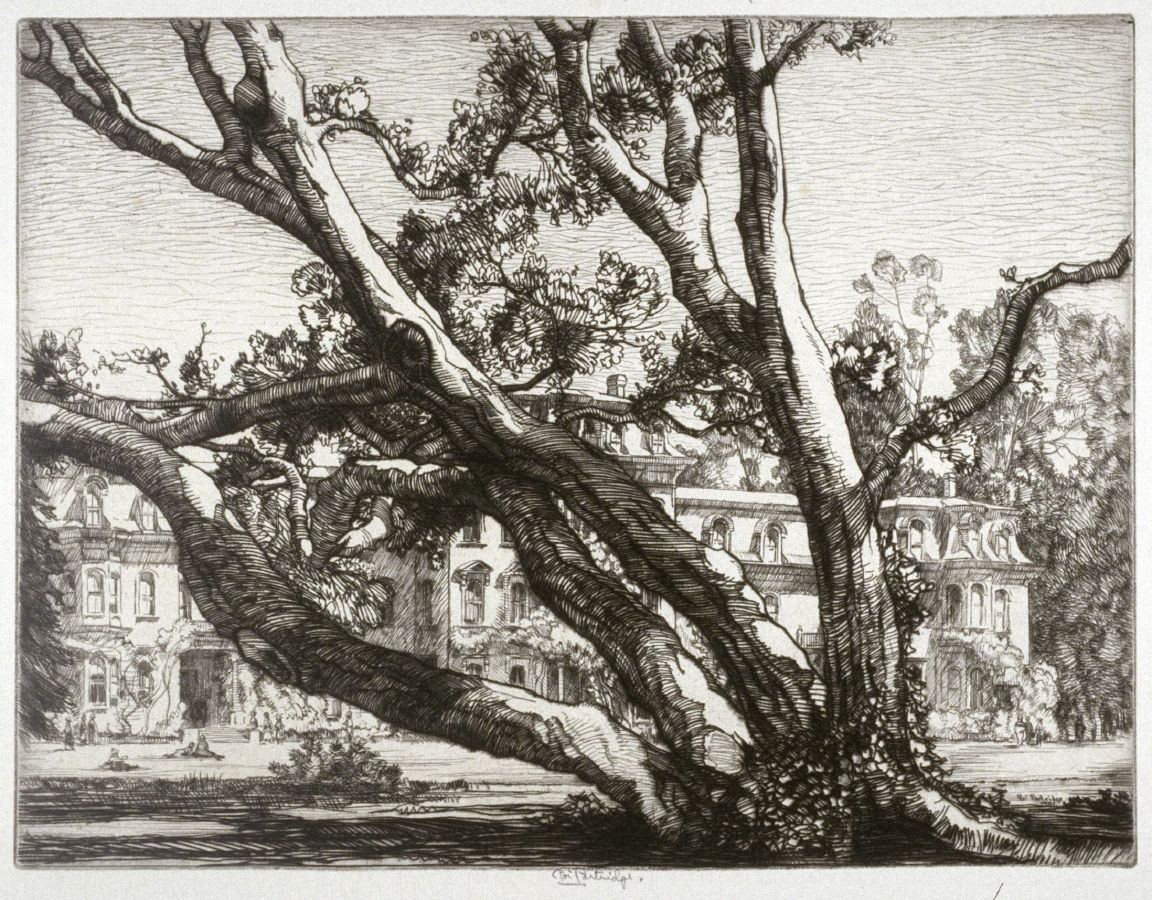
Mills Hall, 1921

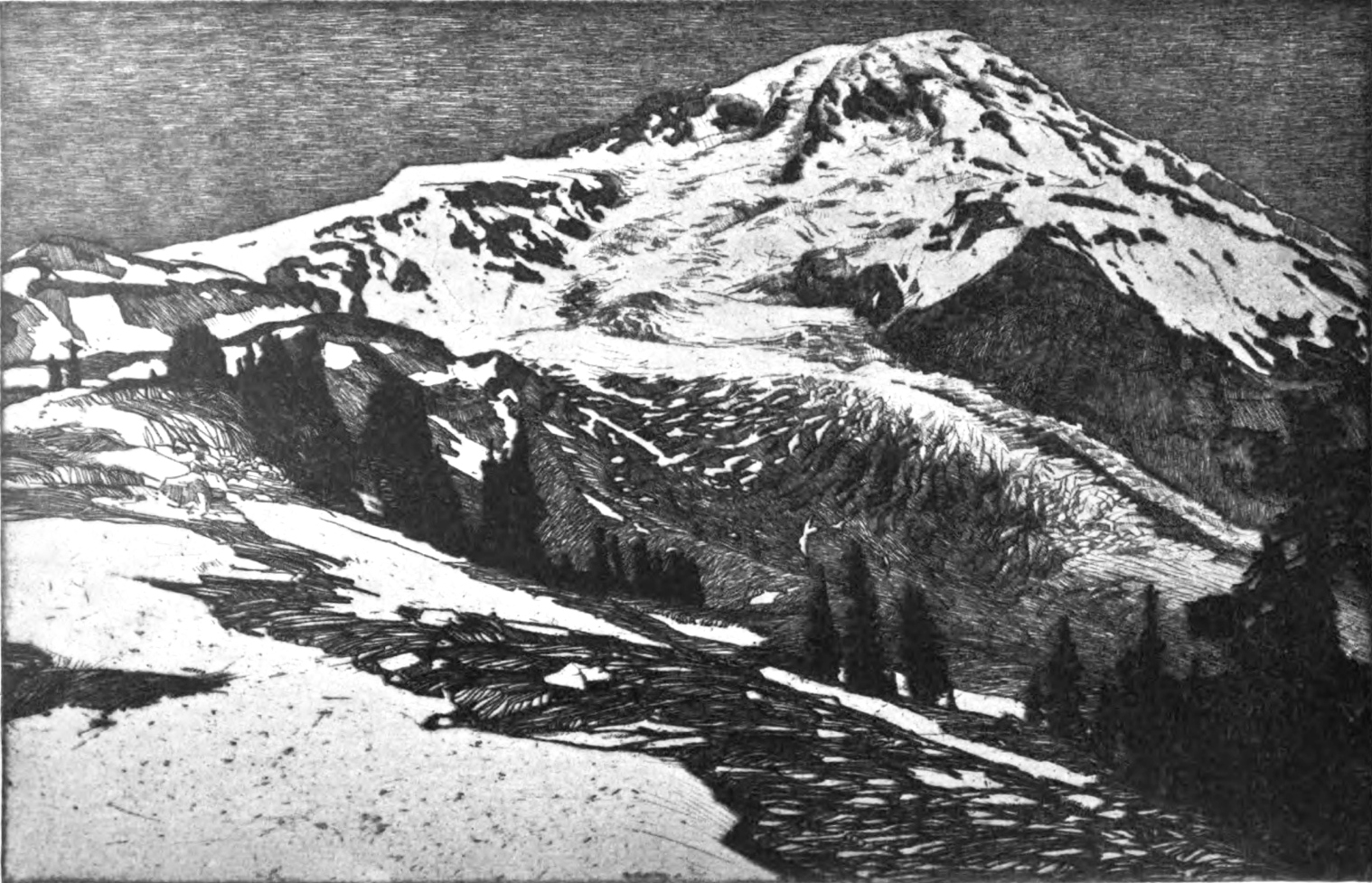
The Marvelous Mountain, ca. 1921
