= Fokko Tadama =

American painter

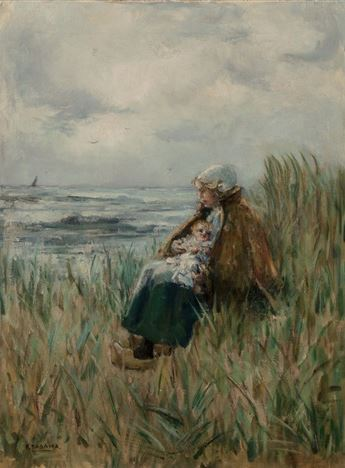
Woman and Her Child at the Seashore

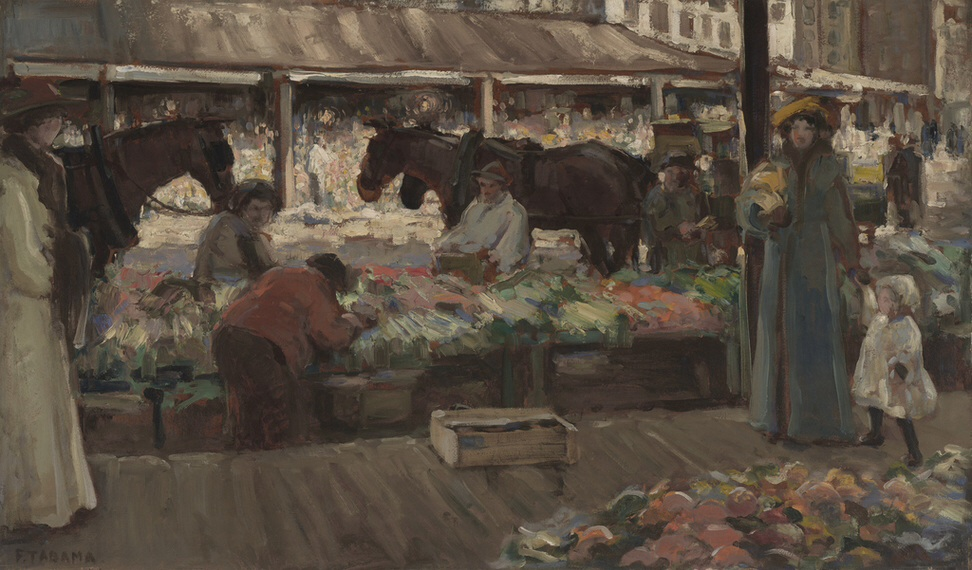
Pike Place Market, Seattle, ca. 1910

Fokko Tadama (16 May 1871 – 25 May 1937) was a Dutch painter in the style of the Hague School, known primarily for coastal scenes, who spent much of his career in the United States. He was also a teacher and focused primarily on Japanese immigrant students.

== Biography ==
He was born in Banda Aceh, Indonesia. His father, Reinier Tadama (1844–1879), was a colonial administrator in Aceh and his mother was his father's mistress; a local woman. He was orphaned when his father died of tuberculosis while at a health spa in Germany. Having been taken to the Netherlands, he remained there and received his first artistic training from the landscape painter Sieger Jan Baukema (1852–1936). Later, he attended the Rijksakademie van beeldende kunsten in Amsterdam. In 1895 he married Thamine Tadama-Groeneveld, who was also a painter. In 1897 they settled in Egmond aan den Hoef and became part of the Egmondse School, led by George Hitchcock. They both specialized in seascapes.

In 1898, they had a joint exhibition at the Société des Artistes Français in Paris. By now, the critics had come to consider Thamine as the better artist and Fokko worked mostly as her assistant. In 1900, he gave up painting and devoted his time to hunting and caring for his large kennel of dogs. In 1907 they relocated to Katwijk aan Zee. The progress of their relationship after that is unclear. Some sources say that Thamine became mentally unsound and had to be institutionalized by 1910, but others indicate that she was exhibiting and winning awards as late as 1912.

Whatever the truth may be, in 1910 he emigrated to the United States, crossed the country, settled in Seattle and began painting again. In 1913, he held his first showing in one of the meeting rooms at the Seattle Public Library. The following year, he started his own art school. Perhaps because his name could be mistaken for Japanese, he soon became a mentor and patron for many Japanese immigrant artists, including Kenjiro Nomura, Yasushi Tanaka and Shimizu Toshi, as well as the photographer Soichi Sunami.

He apparently had a very successful career, until the beginning of the Great Depression virtually destroyed the local demand for art. To make ends meet, he found employment as a mural painter with the WPA and took part in the Federal Art Projects. Impoverished, despondent and in declining health, he died by suicide in 1937 in Seattle.
