= Thamine Tadama-Groeneveld =

Dutch painter

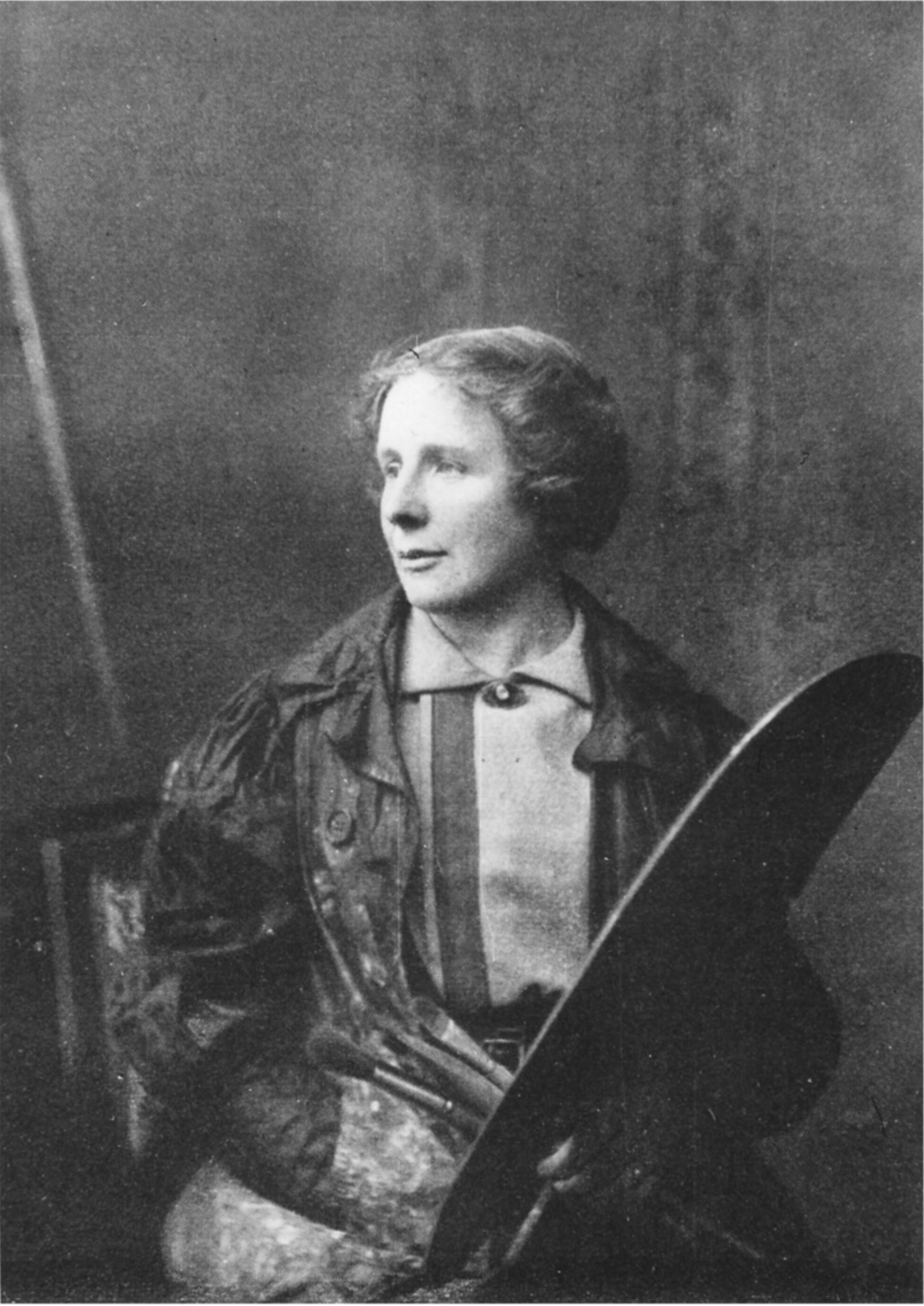
- Born: 15 October 1871; Utrecht, Netherlands
- Died: 3 April 1938 (aged 65); Zandvoort, Netherlands
- Known for: Painting
- Spouse: Fokko Tadama (m. 1895–1935)

Tamina Henriëtte Bartholda Jacoba Tadama-Groeneveld (1871-1938) was a Dutch painter.

== Biography ==
Tadama-Groeneveld was born on 15 October 1871 in Utrecht, Netherlands. She studied at an art academy in Amsterdam and was also a student of George Hitchcock. She was a member of Arti et Amicitiae. In 1895 she married fellow painter Fokko Tadama with whom she had two children. Tadama emigrated to the United States without Tadama-Groeneveld. Tadama-Groeneveld died on 3 April 1938 in Zandvoort.

== Gallery ==
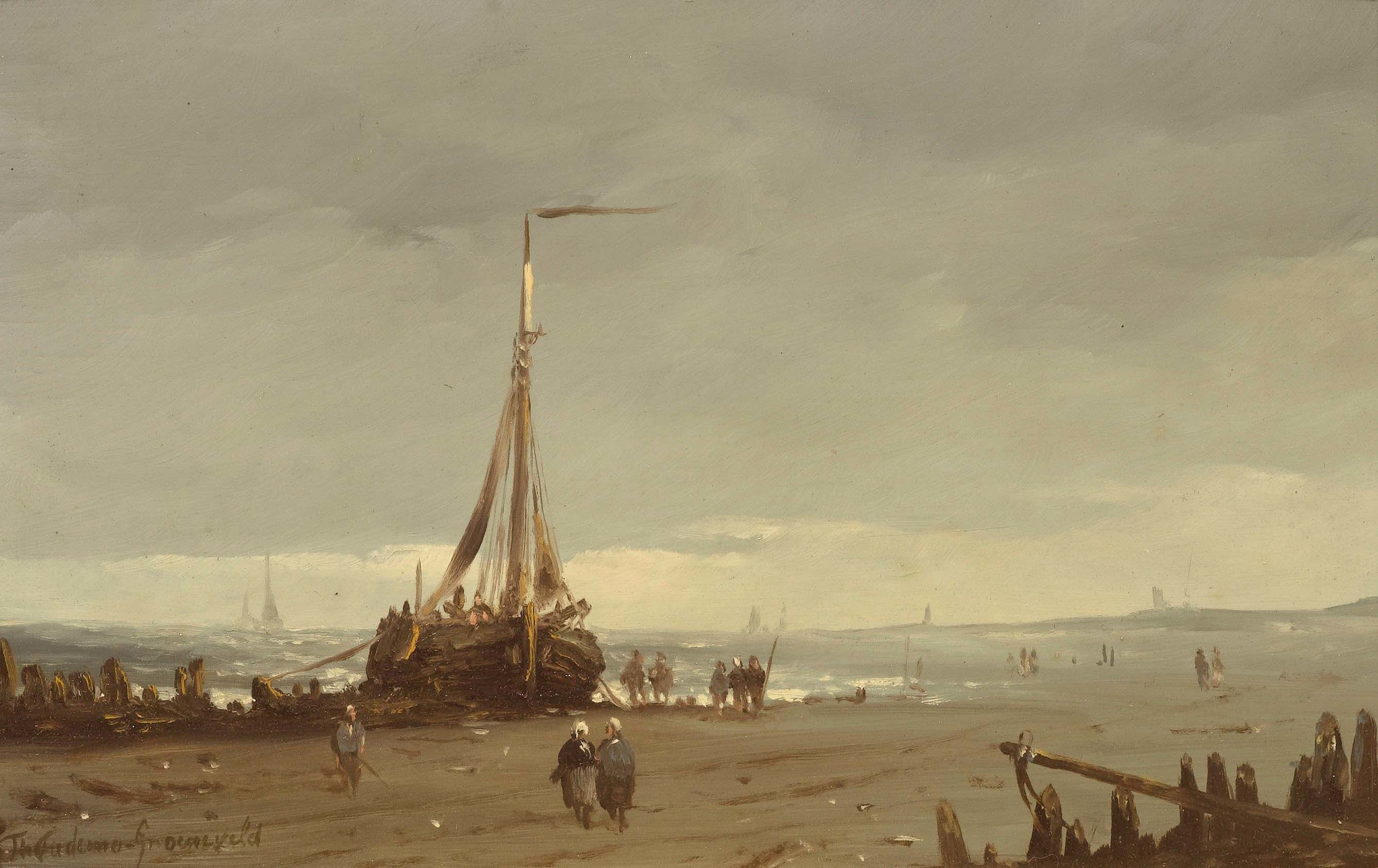
Sailing ship by the coast

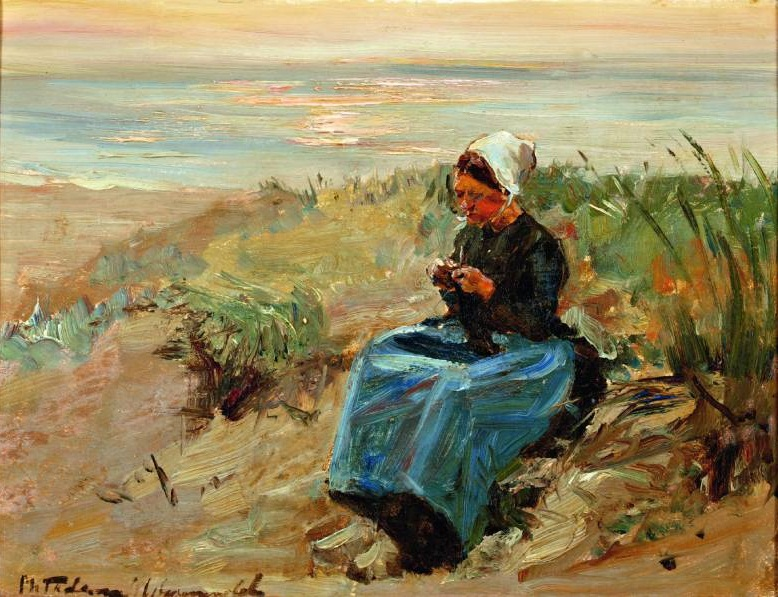
Vissersvrouw in het duin tegen zonsondergang

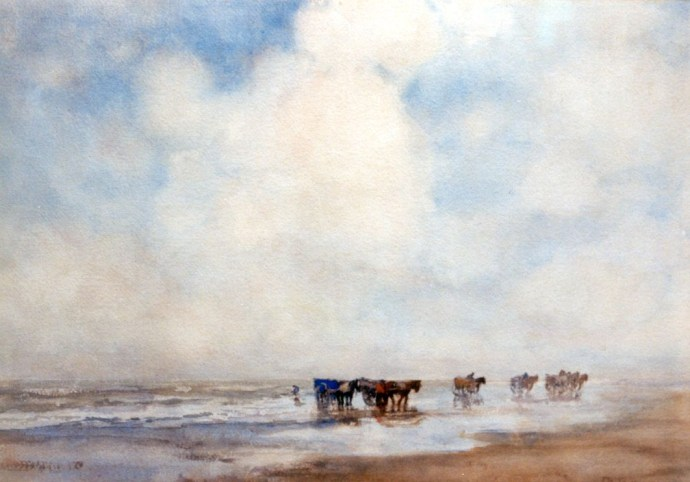
Schelpenvissers langs de waterlijn
