= Cunningham (crater) =

Crater on Mercury

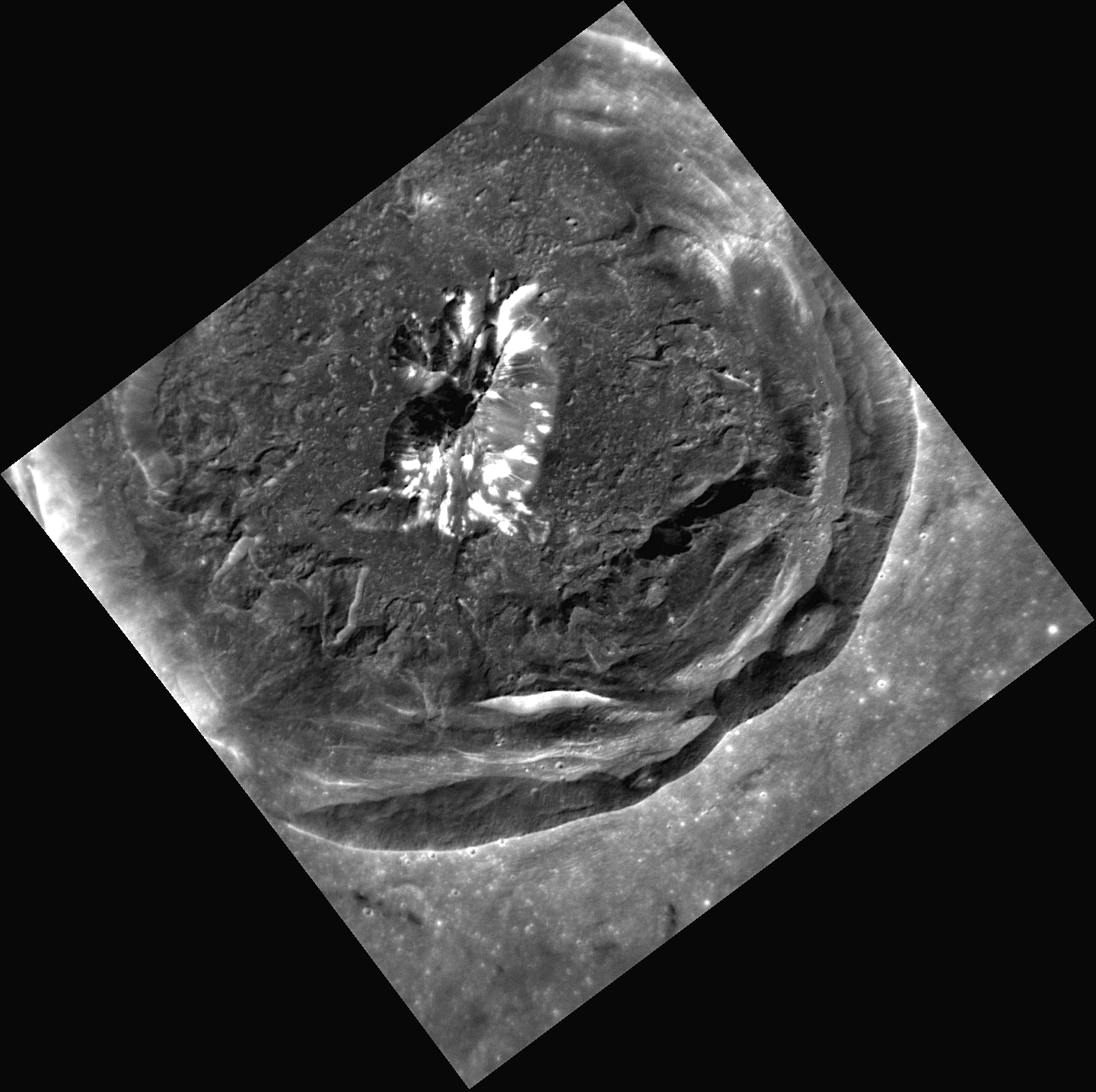
- MESSENGER NAC image focused on Cunningham
- Feature type: Central-peak impact crater
- Location: Raditladi quadrangle, Mercury
- Coordinates: 30.41°N 202.93°W
- Diameter: 37 km (23 mi)
- Eponym: Imogen Cunningham

Cunningham is a young crater on the western floor of the Caloris Basin, on Mercury. It is surrounded by a bright ray system.

The crater's name was adopted by the International Astronomical Union (IAU) in 2008, shortly after its discovery on the first flyby of MESSENGER. It is named for the American photographer Imogen Cunningham.

A confirmed dark spot is present in Cunningham crater. This dark spot is associated with hollows.

== Views ==
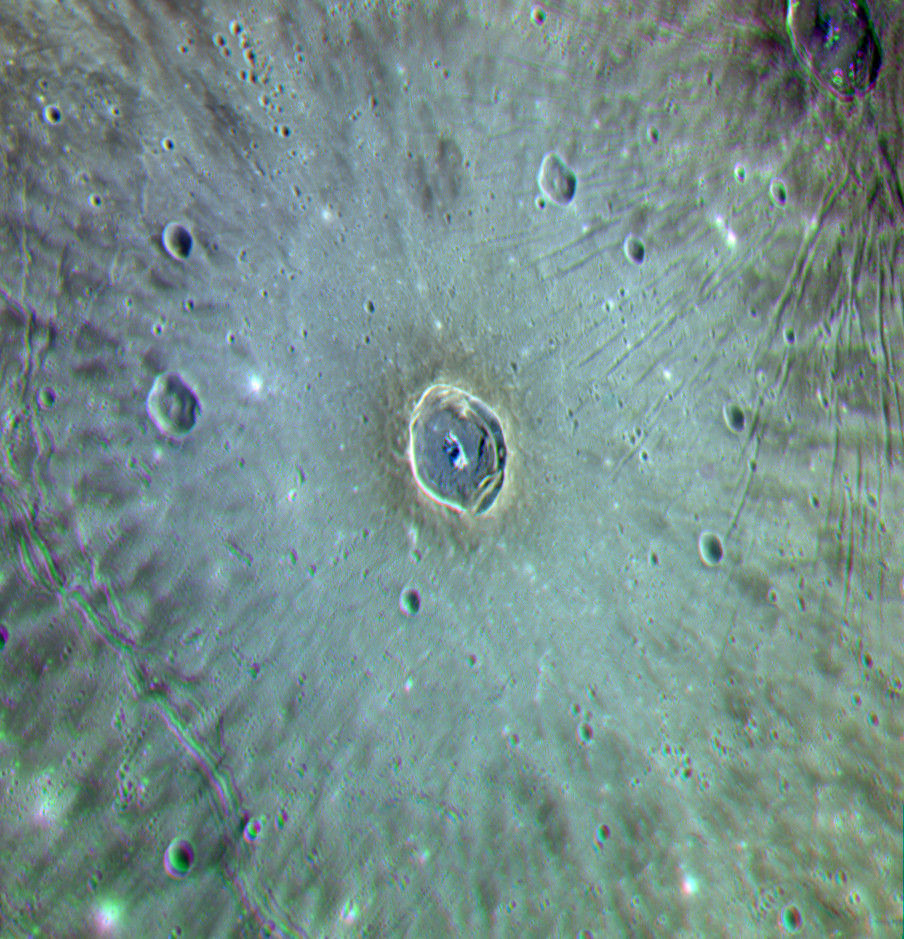
Exaggerated color view of Cunningham

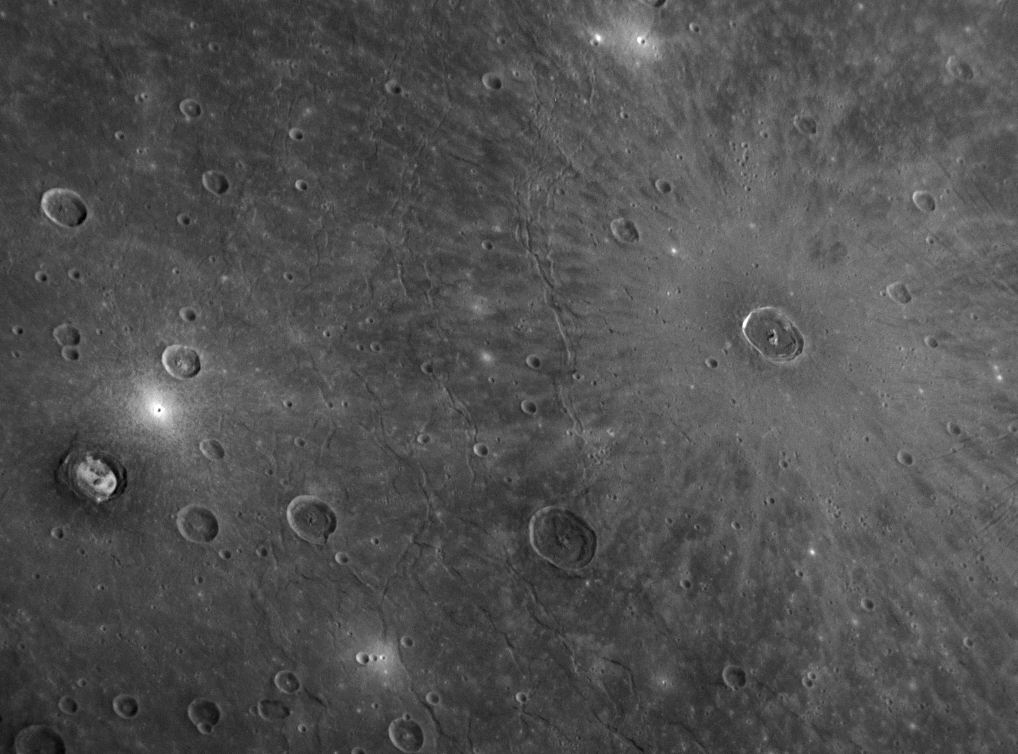
Cunningham is the crater to the right, surrounded by bright rays. Kertész is to the left.
