= Yasushi Tanaka =

Japanese-born artist and art teacher

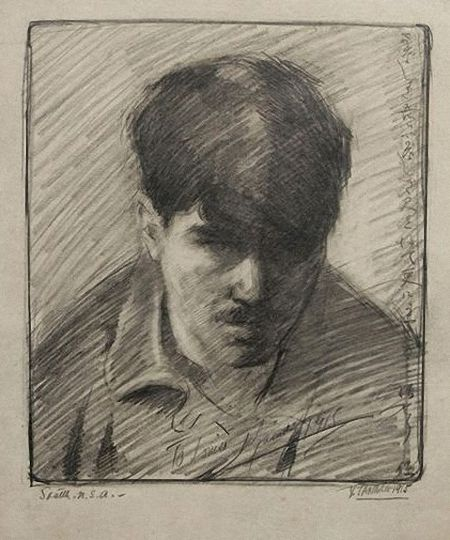
- Self-portrait (1915)
- Born: 13 May 1886; Saitama Prefecture, Japan
- Died: 24 April 1941 (aged 54); Paris
- Occupation: Artist

Yasushi Tanaka (Japanese: 田中 保, Hepburn: Tanaka Yasushi; 13 May 1886 – 24 April 1941) was a Japanese-born artist and art teacher, best known for his portraits of women.

== Life ==
Tanaka's father was a businessman. After his death in 1902, the family went bankrupt and fell into poverty. As soon as he completed his primary education, Tanaka left home and emigrated to Seattle in 1904, where he made his living washing dishes and working as a peanut vendor, while studying English in night classes at Broadway High School. He also studied painting on his own until he was able to arrange formal lessons with the Dutch painter, Fokko Tadama, who would later serve as a patron to Shimizu Toshi and other Japanese-born painters in Seattle. He had his first solo showing in an exhibition room at the Seattle Public Library in 1915 and presented works at the Panama–Pacific International Exposition later that same year.

Over the next two years, his first nude portraits received much negative criticism. As a result, however, in 1917, he met and married the writer and art critic, Louise Gebhard Cann; daughter of Judge Thomas H. Cann. He continued to exhibit for several more years, winning a few awards, but he and Louise decided that the art market in the United States wasn't receptive to his work and they moved to Paris in 1920. There, he exhibited at the Société Nationale des Beaux-Arts, Salon d'Automne, and Salon des Tuileries.

One of his paintings was purchased by the French government. In 1924, eight of his paintings were acquired by Prince Naruhiko Higashikuni and Prince Yasuhiko Asaka, who were in France studying at the École spéciale militaire de Saint-Cyr. The following year, he sold a painting to the Musée du Luxembourg.

He would live on the Rue Notre-Dame-des-Champs in Paris from 1923 until his death. In 1939, following the outbreak of World War II, most of the Japanese in France were compelled to return to Japan but, having an American wife, he was able to stay in Paris. He died during the German Occupation. After the war, Louise took his ashes to Japan for interment. A retrospective was held at the Marseille Gallery in Paris in 1946.

His unsold paintings remained with Louise until after her death, when they were discovered by an art collector who took them to Japan and, in 1976, presented the first showing of Tanaka's works in his homeland. Most of them are now in the collection of the Museum of Modern Art in Saitama. His papers are held at the Archives of American Art.

== Selected paintings ==
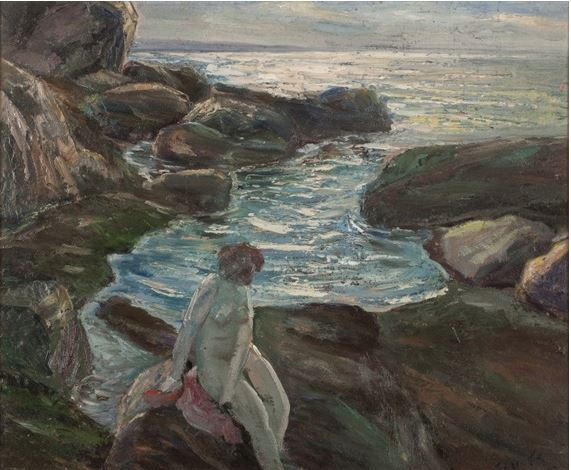
Cliffs

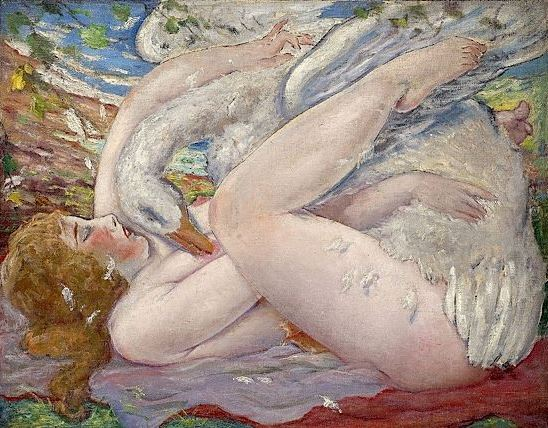
Leda and the Swan

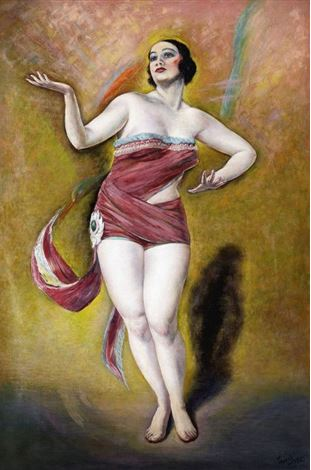
Dancing Woman
in Costume

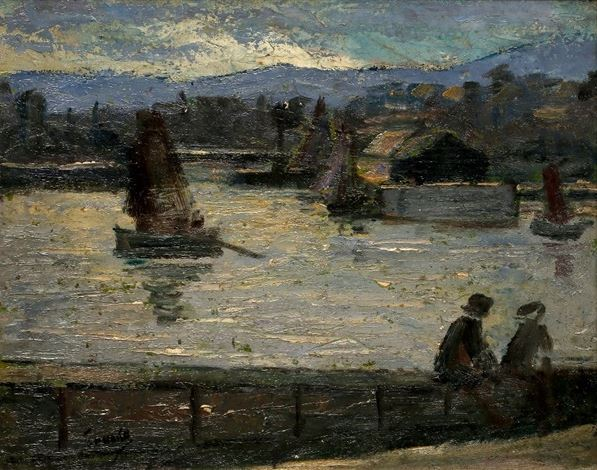
Evening on the River
