= Town Crier (newspaper) =

Weekly newspaper in Toronto, Canada

Streeter
- Editor: Eric McMillan
- Former editors: Ruth Goldhar (1978–2004)
- Staff writers: Dennis Hanagan, Rodger Burnside, Jay Garak, Carolyn Bennett
- Categories: Community newspaper
- Frequency: Weekly
- First issue: 1978
- Country: Canada
- Based in: 455 Danforth Ave., Toronto, Ontario, M4K 1P1
- Language: English
- Website: www.streeter.ca

Streeter Publications, known as Streeter and known formally as Town Crier, is a group of Toronto-based community newspapers that spans across 10 districts in Toronto.

The newspapers are distributed in six editions to six communities throughout the city of Toronto. Started in 1978 by Harry Goldhar, a Toronto Star journalist, the Town Crier group has changed owners and titles over the years.

Dan Iannuzzi was the owner of the Town Crier from 2001 until his death in November 2004. Iannuzzi's company bought the Town Crier newspapers in 2001 from Beaches resident Julie Morris, who had previously acquired them from Leaside residents Harry and Ruth Goldhar who had founded the papers with an East York-based edition in 1978. By the time of Iannuzzi's death the papers had expanded to nine editions that covered an area of over 287,000 homes and nearly a million residents in Toronto.

Town Crier published nine editions serving the Toronto neighbourhoods of Bayview Mills, Beach-South Riverdale, Riverdale-East York, Bloor West, Forest Hill, Leaside-Rosedale, North Toronto, North York and MidTown.

The chain indefinitely suspended publication in May 2013, along with sister papers Corriere Canadese, Vaughan Today and several other publications after parent company Multimedia Nova went into receivership.

Former Town Crier staff members bought the publications and three of the papers were relaunched in September 2013. As of February 2015, six papers are published monthly and biweekly: Central Toronto Town Crier, Forest Hill Town Crier, Leaside Town Crier, North Toronto Town Crier, North Toronto East Town Crier, and North Toronto West Town Crier.
