= Shimizu Toshi =

Japanese painter (1887–1945)

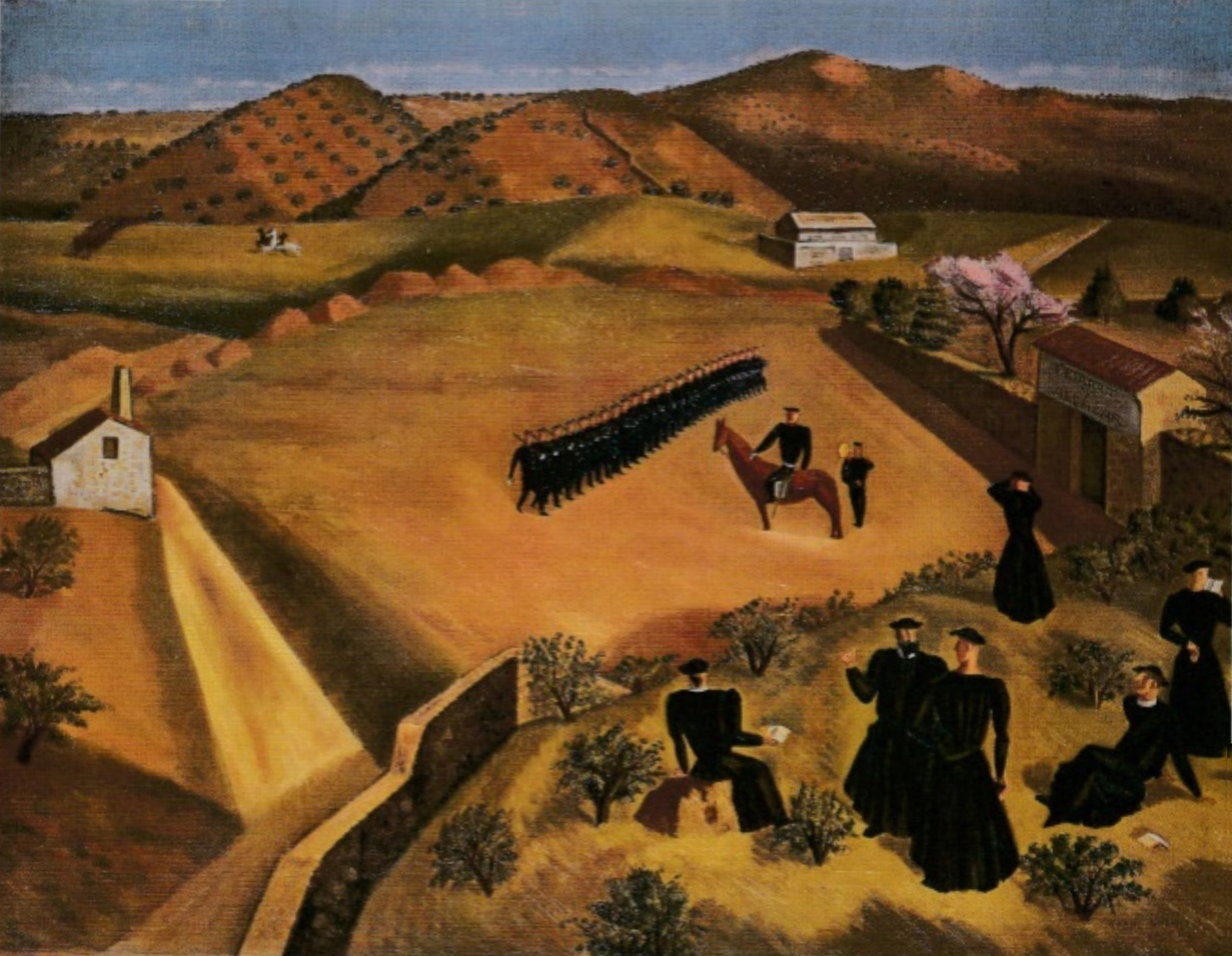
Soldiers and Monks on the Outskirts of Toledo

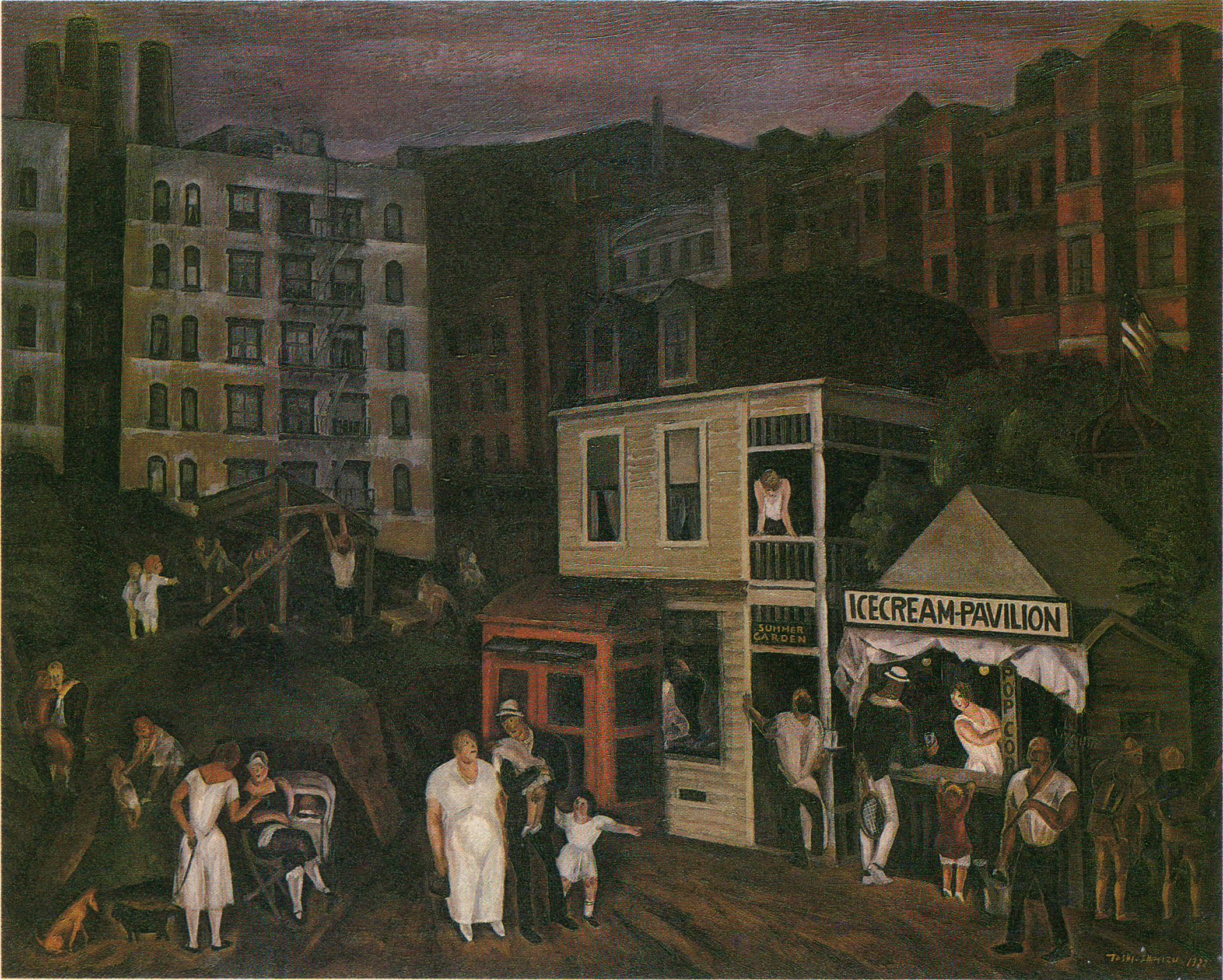
Ice-Cream Pavilion

Shimizu Toshi (清水 登之; 1 January 1887, Tochigi Prefecture – 7 December 1945, Tochigi Prefecture) was a Japanese painter in the yōga style.

== Life and work ==
He originally planned to have a career in the military, but failed the qualifying exam at the Imperial Japanese Army Academy. After considering other options, he decided to become a painter and, in 1907, went to the United States in pursuit of that goal. It took him five years of working odd jobs in Seattle before he met the Dutch painter, Fokko Tadama, who took him on as a student and was able to gain him admission to a local art school. After graduating, he briefly returned to Japan to marry his childhood sweetheart.

In 1917, they moved to New York, where he joined the Art Students League. While there, he made contact with his fellow Japanese emigrant painters, Kuniyoshi Yasuo and Ishigaki Eitarō, who had also studied in Seattle. His primary instructor was John French Sloan, who had a profound influence on his style. His best known early paintings are light hearted scenes from the streets of New York. He won an award at a major painting and sculpture exhibition in 1921, but the prize was rescinded because he was not an American citizen.

In 1924, he and his wife moved to France, where he exhibited at the Salon d’Automne. Later, he was awarded a prize at the Salon of the Société des Artistes Indépendants for his portrayal of soldiers and monks in Toledo, Spain.

He returned to Japan in 1927, settled in Tokyo, and became a founding member of the Independent Art Association. He became a staunch supporter of the Japanese military forces and, during the Pacific War, he created a series of propagandistic battle paintings, apparently done from photographs.

During the last days of the war, he and his family were evacuated to their ancestral home in Tochigi Prefecture. He died in December of that year, shortly after learning that his eldest son, Ikuo, had been killed in June.

== Sources ==
- "Shimizu Toshi". In: Japanische Malerei im westlichen Stil (exhibition catalog), Museum für Ostasiatische Kunst, Cologne, 1985
- Laurance P. Roberts: "Shimizu Toshi". In: A Dictionary of Japanese Artists. Weatherhill, 1976. ISBN 0-8348-0113-2.
