= Imogen Cunningham =

American photographer (1883–1976)

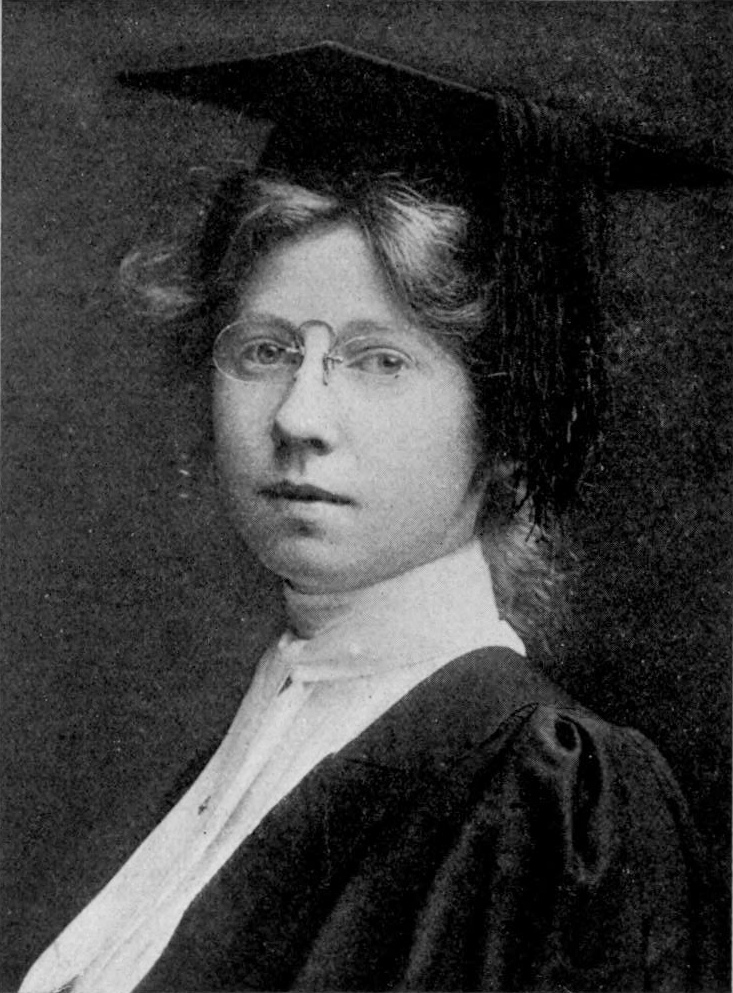
- Cunningham in 1907
- Born: April 12, 1883; Portland, Oregon, U.S.
- Died: June 23, 1976 (aged 93); San Francisco, California, U.S.
- Education: University of Washington
- Notable work: Magnolia Blossom (1925); Triangles (1928)
- Spouse: Roi Partridge (1915–1934)
- Website: imogencunningham.com

Imogen Cunningham (/ˈkʌnɪŋəm/; April 12, 1883 – June 23, 1976) was an American photographer known for her botanical photography, nudes, and industrial landscapes. Cunningham was a member of the California-based Group f/64, known for its dedication to the sharp-focus rendition of simple subjects.

== Early life ==
Cunningham was born in Portland, Oregon to father Isaac Burns Cunningham and mother Susan Elizabeth Cunningham (née Johnson). Her parents were from Missouri, though both of their families originally came from Virginia. Cunningham was the fifth of 10 children. Although art was not included in the traditional school curriculum, as a child Cunningham took art lessons on weekends and during vacations.

She grew up in Seattle, Washington and attended the Denny School at 5th and Battery Streets in Seattle.

In 1901, at the age of eighteen, Cunningham bought her first camera, a 4x5 inch view camera, via mail order from the American School of Art in Scranton, Pennsylvania.

She entered the University of Washington in 1903, where she became a charter member of the Washington Alpha chapter of Pi Beta Phi fraternity for Women. It was not until 1906, while studying at the University of Washington in Seattle, that she was inspired to take up photography again by an encounter with the work of Gertrude Käsebier. Her first photographs in 1906 were portraits taken with a 4-by-5-inch-format camera. With the help of her chemistry professor, Horace Byers, she began to study the chemistry behind photography while paying for her tuition by photographing plants for the botany department.

In 1907, Cunningham graduated from the University of Washington with a degree in chemistry. Her thesis was titled "Modern Processes of Photography." While there, she served as class vice-president, participated in the German Club and Chemistry Club, and was on the yearbook staff.

== Career ==
After graduating from college in 1907, Cunningham went to work for Edward S. Curtis in his Seattle studio, gaining knowledge about the portrait business and practical photography. Cunningham worked for Curtis on his project of documenting American Indian tribes for the book The North American Indian, which was published in twenty volumes between 1907 and 1930. Cunningham learned the technique of platinum printing under Curtis's supervision and became fascinated by the process.

=== Germany ===
In 1909, Cunningham was awarded the Pi Beta Phi Graduate Fellowship. This grant allowed her to continue her studies at the Technische Hochschule (trans.: Technical University) in Dresden, Germany, with Professor Robert Luther, the founder of the university's Institut für Photographie. There, she didn't take many photographs, but helped the photographic chemistry department find cheaper solutions for the expensive and rare platinum used for printing. In May 1910, she finished her paper, "About the direct development of platinum paper for brown tones", describing her process aiming to increase printing speed, improve clarity of highlights tones, and produce sepia tones.

On her way back to Seattle, she met with photographers Alvin Langdon Coburn (in London) and Alfred Stieglitz and Gertrude Käsebier in New York.

=== Seattle ===
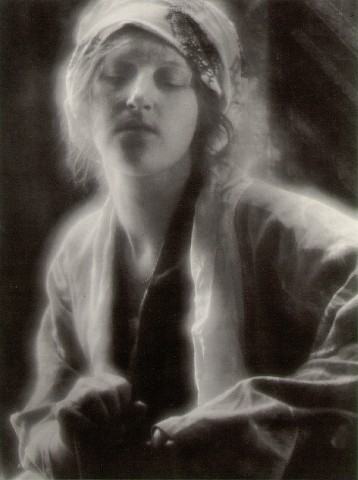
Dream (1910) by Cunningham

In Seattle, Cunningham opened a studio and later won acclaim for portraiture and pictorial work. Most of her studio work of this time consisted of sitters in their own homes, in her living room, or in the woods surrounding her cottage. At one point she and her husband Roi Partridge, a Seattle artist and print maker, climbed up to the Alpine wild flower fields on Mt. Rainier where Roi posed nude as a mystical woodland faun. Her images were shown by the Seattle Fine Arts Society and were later published in the Seattle newspaper the Town Crier, where they caused a scandal due to a woman photographing a male nude. One critic wrote that her work was vulgar and charged her with being an immoral woman, but Cunningham stated that, "It didn't make a single bit of difference in my business. Nobody thought worse of me." Cunningham didn't revisit those photographs for another fifty-five years.

Cunningham was also known to take nude photos of herself of which her granddaughter, Meg Partridge, said: "Her self-portraits really show her sense of humor, and she was smart about her career. She actively published her work in magazines and newspapers. She had a good eye, but she was a great editor. She knew how to edit her work, so what the world sees is an impressive selection of work."

She became a sought-after photographer and exhibited at the Brooklyn Institute of Arts and Sciences in 1913. In 1914, Cunningham's portraits were shown at An International Exhibition of Pictorial Photography in New York. Wilson's Photographic Magazine published a portfolio of her work.

The next year, she married Partridge. Between 1915 and 1920, Cunningham continued her work and had three children (Gryffyd, Rondal, who also became a photographer, and Padraic) with Partridge.

=== California ===
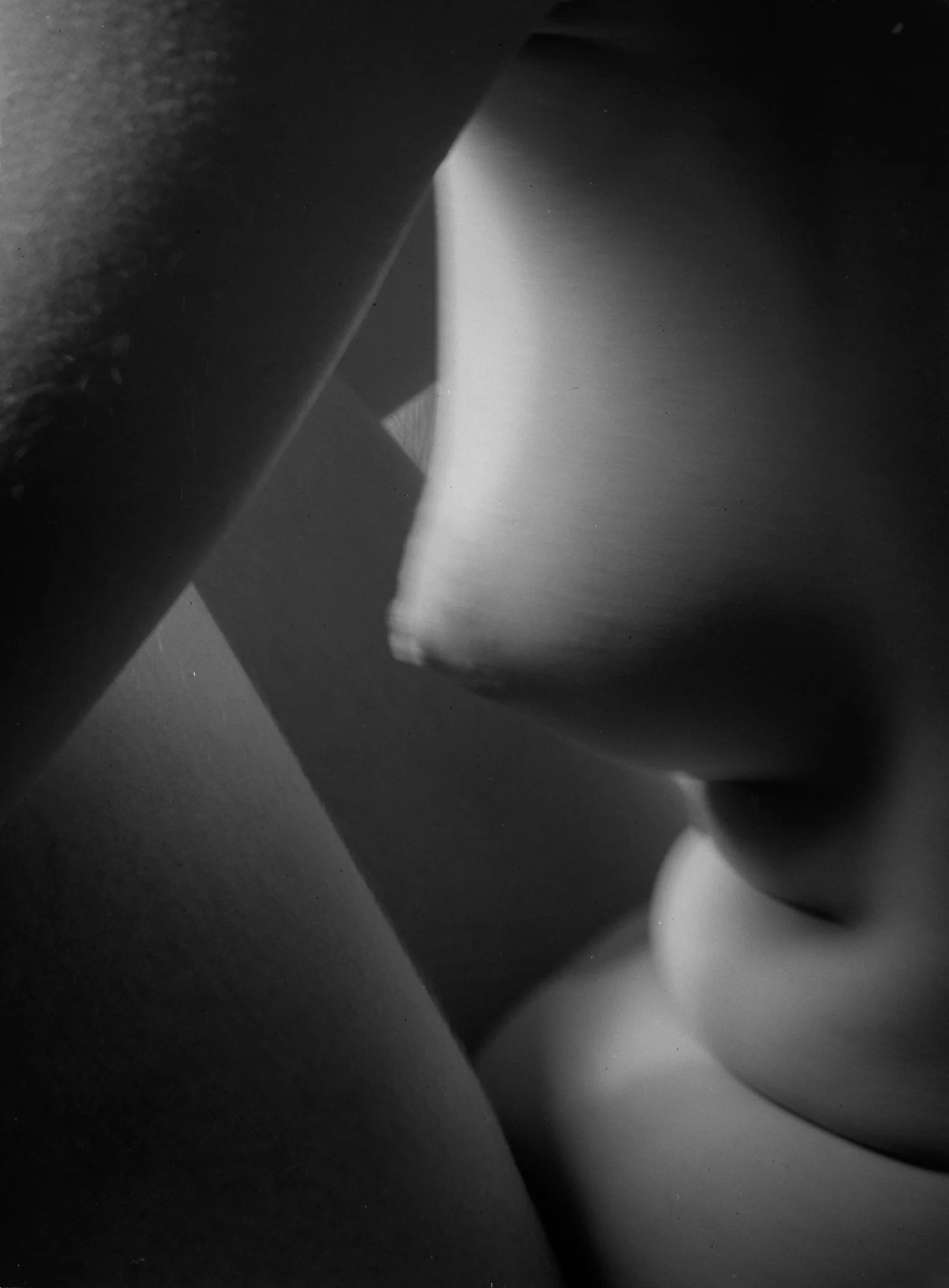
Triangles, 1928, by Imogen Cunningham

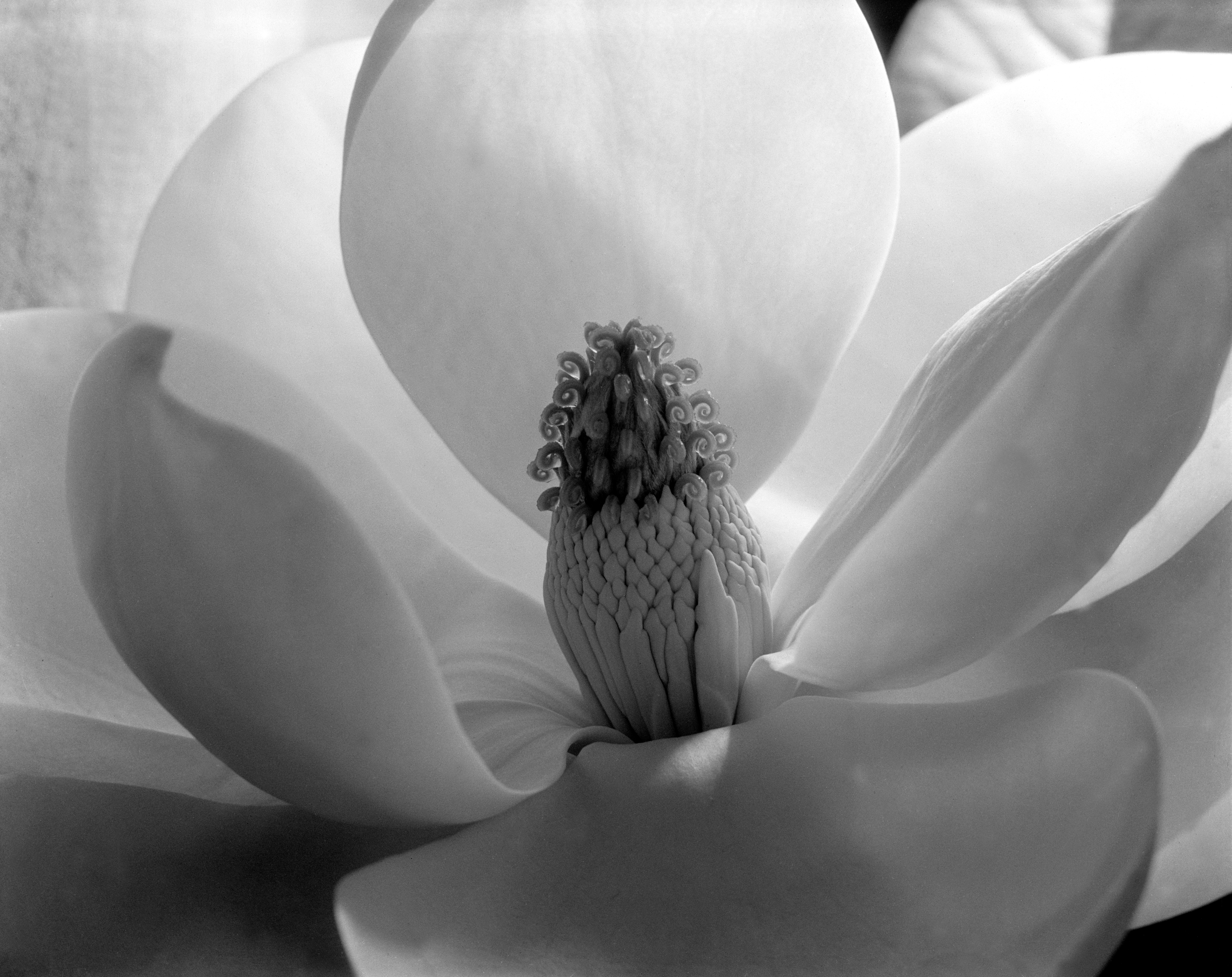
Magnolia Blossom, 1925, by Imogen Cunningham

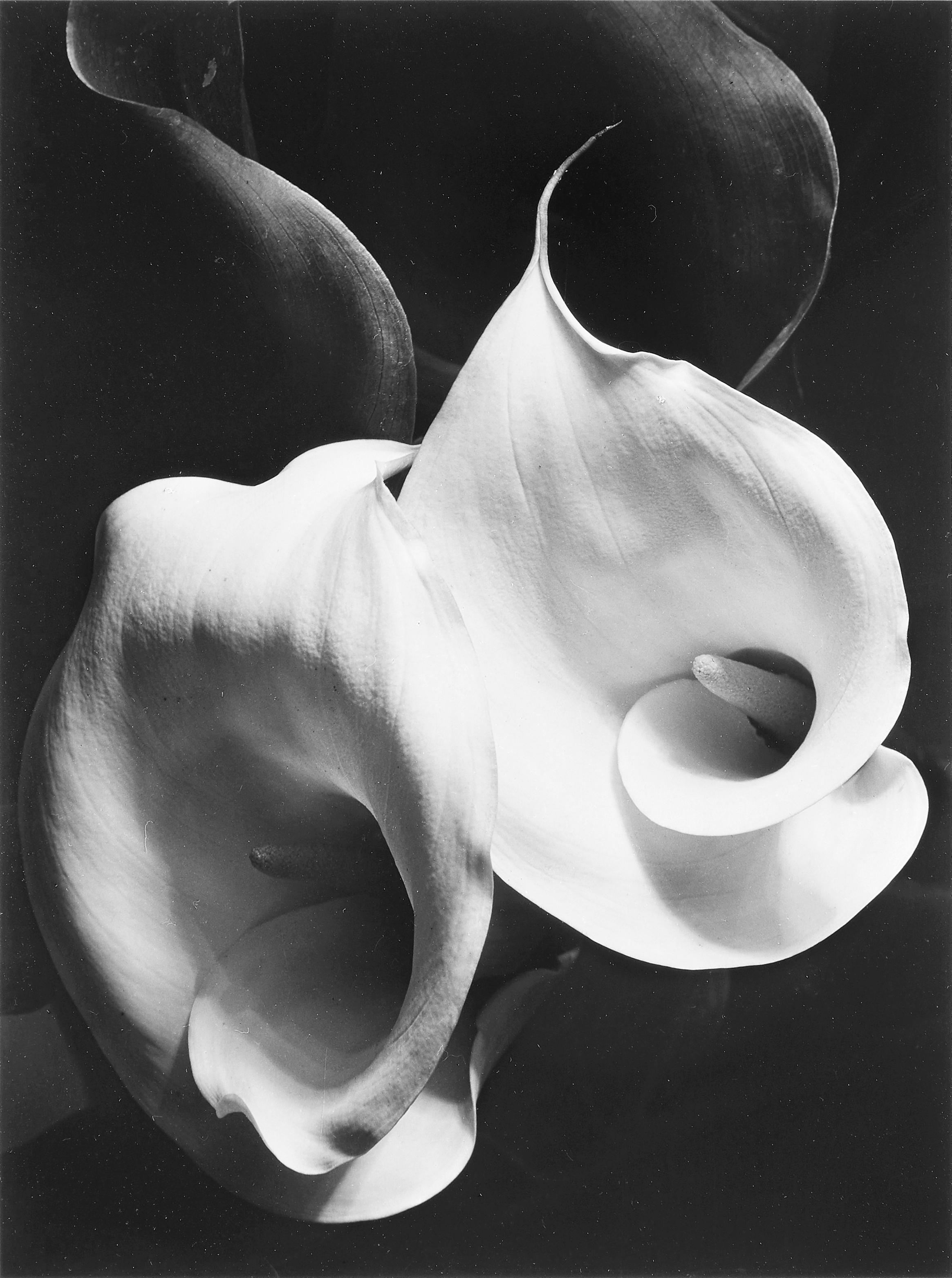
Two Callas, 1925, by Imogen Cunningham

In 1917, the family moved to San Francisco, and in 1920 they moved to the Mills College campus in Oakland, where Partridge taught art.

Cunningham refined her style, taking a greater interest in pattern and detail and becoming increasingly interested in botanical photography, especially flowers. Between 1923 and 1925 she carried out an in-depth study of the Magnolia flower. In 1933, Cunningham founded the California Horticultural Society in which her images were so detailed and clear that many horticulturalist and scientists used her images in their studies. Later in the decade she turned her attention toward industry, creating several series of industrial landscapes in Los Angeles and Oakland.

In 1929, Edward Weston nominated 10 of Cunningham's photographs (8 botanical, 1 industrial, and 1 nude) for inclusion in the "Film und Foto" exhibition. Her renowned Two Callas debuted in that exhibition.

Cunningham once again changed direction, becoming more interested in the human form, particularly hands, and she was fascinated with the hands of artists and musicians. This interest led to her employment by Vanity Fair, photographing stars without make-up.

==== Group f/64 ====
As Cunningham moved away from pictorialism to embrace sharp-focus photography she joined with like-minded photographers, including Ansel Adams, Edward Weston, and Willard Van Dyke. Together these individuals formed Group f/64 to promote a more relevant and meaningful style of photography, that rejected soft and pictorial and promoted what they called "pure or straight photography." They aimed to promote simple and straightforward photography technique that employed the smallest focal apertures (f/64 being the smallest) to create finely detailed images. In an interview Cunningham mentioned that the f/64 group "is not only American, it is Western American. It isn't even American. It's western." She also mentioned, "This does not mean that we all used the small aperture, but we were for reality. That was what we talked about too. Not being phony, you know."

==== Vanity Fair ====
In 1932, Cunningham was invited to do some work in New York for Vanity Fair. They commissioned her to make portraits of "ugly men" that were prominent in the arts. She created photographs that highlighted actors Wallace Beery and Spencer Tracy. Her work with Vanity Fair, Sunset and other magazines included portraits of Gertrude Stein, Minor White, James Broughton, Martha Graham, August Sander, Man Ray and Theodore Roethke. She continued with Vanity Fair until it stopped publication in 1936.

== Later career ==
=== Street photography ===
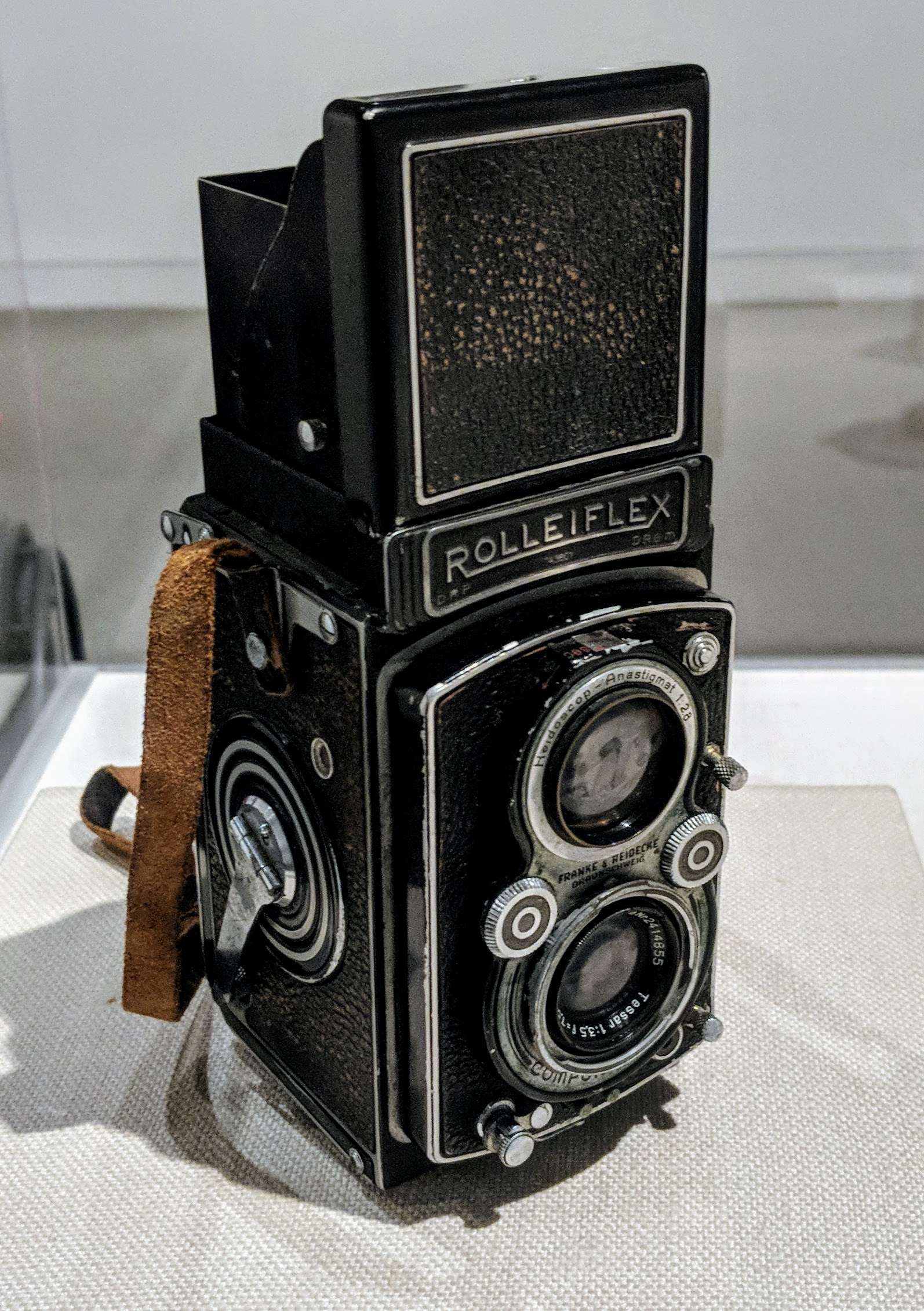
A Rolleiflex used by Cunningham in the 1950s, on display at the Oakland Museum of California

In the 1940s, Cunningham turned to documentary street photography, which she executed as a side project while supporting herself with her commercial and studio photography. In 1945, Cunningham was invited by Ansel Adams to accept a position as a faculty member for the art photography department at the California School of Fine Arts. Dorothea Lange and Minor White joined as well.

=== Mentorship ===
In 1964, Imogen Cunningham met the photographer Judy Dater while leading a workshop focusing on the life and work of Edward Weston in Big Sur Hot Springs, California which later became the Esalen Institute. Dater was greatly inspired by Cunningham's life and work. Cunningham is featured in one of Dater's most popular photographs, Imogen and Twinka at Yosemite, which depicts elderly Cunningham encountering nude model Twinka Thiebaud behind a tree in Yosemite National Park. The two shared an interest in portraiture and remained friends until Cunningham's death in 1976. Three years later, Dater published Imogen Cunningham: A Portrait, containing interviews with many of Cunningham's photographic contemporaries, friends, and family along with photographs by both Dater and Cunningham.

In 1973, her work was exhibited at the Rencontres d'Arles photography festival in France through the group exhibition: Trois photographes américaines, Imogen Cunningham, Linda Connor, Judy Dater.

The American photographer Claudia Kunin cites Cunningham as a major source of her artistic inspiration.

== Awards ==
- 1967: Fellow of the American Academy of Arts and Sciences
- 1968: Honorary Doctorate of Fine Arts degree from the California College of Arts and Crafts in Oakland
- 1970: Guggenheim fellowship in Creative Arts for Photography
- [Unknown year]: Dorothea Lange Award – first recipient
- 2004: Hall of Fame Inductee, International Photography Hall of Fame and Museum
- 2008: A crater on the planet Mercury was named in her honor.

== Personal life ==
On February 11, 1915, Cunningham married etching artist, printmaker and teacher Roi Partridge. They had three sons: Gryffyd Partridge and twins Rondal Partridge and Padraic Partridge. The couple divorced in 1934. Rondal's daughter, Meg Partridge, cataloged Cunningham's work.

As of 1940, Cunningham lived in Oakland, California, though she had studios in various locations in San Francisco.

Cunningham continued to take photographs until shortly before her death at age 93, on June 23, 1976, in San Francisco, California.

Cunningham was named Imogen after the heroine of Shakespeare's Cymbeline.

== Works and publications ==
=== Books ===
Chronological by date of publication

- Cunningham, Imogen. Modern Processes of Photography. Thesis, University of Washington, 1907. OCLC 12295089
- Cunningham, Imogen. "After Ninety." Seattle and London: University of Washington Press, 1977. ISBN 0-295-95559-7, and 0-295-95673-9(pbk.)
- Cunningham, Imogen, and Richard Lorenz. Imogen Cunningham: Portraiture. Boston: Little, Brown and Co, 1997. ISBN 978-0-821-22437-3 OCLC 38157997
- Cunningham, Imogen, and Richard Lorenz. Imogen Cunningham: On the Body. Boston: Bullfinch Press, 1998. ISBN 978-0-821-22438-0 OCLC 40220514
- Cunningham, Imogen, Richard Lorenz, and Manfred Heiting. Imogen Cunningham, 1883–1976. Köln: Taschen, 2001. ISBN 978-3-822-87182-9 OCLC 47892628
- Cunningham, Imogen, and Richard Lorenz. Imogen Cunningham: Flora. 2001. ISBN 978-0-821-22731-2 OCLC 47784515
- Cunningham, Imogen, Meg Partridge, John Wood, Elizabeth Partridge, Rondal Partridge, John Marcy, Pam Clark, and Crissy Welzen. Imogen Cunningham: Platinum and Palladium. South Dennis, Mass.: 21st Editions, Steven Albahari, 2012. OCLC 855783549
- Cunningham, Imogen, William Morris, John Wood, Pam Clark, Crissy Welzen, Sam Klimek, Arthur Larson, Sarah Creighton, and Steven Albahari. Imogen Cunningham: Symbolist; with Poetry and Prose by William Morris. South Dennis, Mass.: 21st Editions, Steven Albahari, 2013. OCLC 868338137

=== Exhibition catalogs ===
Chronological by date of exhibition

- Cunningham, Imogen. Imogen Cunningham: Photographs 1921–1967. Stanford, Calif.: Leland Stanford Junior University, 1967. OCLC 2944896
  - Exhibition held March 31 to April 23, 1967, Stanford Art Gallery, Leland Stanford Junior University.
- Massar, Phyllis Dearborn, and Imogen Cunningham. Photographs by Imogen Cunningham. New York, N.Y.: Metropolitan Museum of Art, 1973. OCLC 23797397, 893700782
  - Catalog of an exhibition held on the balcony of the Blumenthal Patio, Metropolitan Museum of Art, New York, Apr. 24 – July 2, 1973.
  - Photographs by Imogen Cunningham. at the Metropolitan Museum of Art
- Cunningham, Imogen, and Margery Mann. Imogen!: Imogen Cunningham Photographs, 1910–1973. 1974. ISBN 978-0-295-95332-8 OCLC 828338
  - Published in connection with an exhibition shown at the Henry Art Gallery, University of Washington, March 23 – April 21, 1974
- Cunningham, Imogen, and Richard Lorenz. Imogen Cunningham: Frontiers : Photographs 1906–1976. Berkeley, Calif: The Trust, 1978. OCLC 20410345
  - An exhibition organized by the Imogen Cunningham Trust in 1978; essay by Richard Lorenz.
- Cunningham, Imogen. The Photography of Imogen Cunningham: A Centennial Selection. New York, N.Y.: The Museum, 1985. OCLC 84612868
  - Centennial celebration at Whitney Museum of American Art at Philip Morris, December 13, 1985 – January 30, 1986.
- Cunningham, Imogen, and Richard Lorenz. Imogen Cunningham: MEJE fotografieje 1906–1976. Ljubljana: Moderna Galerija, 1987. OCLC 123406725
  - Exhibition "Imogen Cunningham" held at the Moderna Galerija, Ljubljana, March 10–31, 1987. In Slovenian.
- Cunningham, Imogen, and Richard Lorenz. Imogen Cunningham: frontiers : fotografie 1906–1976. Roma: U.S.I.S., 1987. OCLC 35835030
  - Exhibition held at Villa Croce, Genova, Oct. 28 – November 22, 1987.
- Cunningham, Imogen, and Richard Lorenz. Imogen Cunningham: fronteras, fotografías, 1906–1976. [Madrid]: [Círculo de Bellas Artes], 1988. OCLC 45036528
  - Círculo de Bellas Artes, Madrid, 26 de enero al 28 de febrero de 1988. Exposición organizada por the Imogen Cunningham Trust, Berkeley, California, Círculo de Bellas Artes, Embajada de los Estados Unidos; ensayo de R. Lorenz.
- Heyman, Therese Thau, Mary Street Alinder, and Naomi Rosenblum. Seeing Straight: The F.64 Revolution in Photography. Oakland, Calif: Oakland Museum, 1992. ISBN 978-0-295-97219-0 OCLC 26907957
  - Published to coincide with a major traveling exhibition, organized by the Oakland Museum in 1992, which re-creates the original 1932 exhibition by Group f.64.
- Cunningham, Imogen. Imogen Cunningham: die Poesie der Form. Schaffhausen: Edition Stemmle, 1993. ISBN 978-3-905-51407-0 OCLC 29687447
  - Catalog of an exhibition held August 28 through October 3, 1993 at the Fotografie Forum Frankfurt. German and English.
- San Francisco Camerawork, and Alliance français de San Francisco. Imogen Cunningham: Paris in the Sixties = Imogen Cunningham : Paris Dans Les Années Soixante. San Francisco: Alliance français de San Francisco, 1993. OCLC 80832977
  - Catalogue of a traveling exhibition held in San Francisco, Oct. 14 – November 10, 1993, organized by San Francisco Camerawork and the Alliance français de San Francisco. English and French. Venues in the United States: Denver, Atlanta, and Boston; venues in France: Arles, Paris.
- Cunningham, Imogen, and Richard Lorenz. Imogen Cunningham: A Retrospective Exhibition, September 15 – November 4, 1995, Howard Greenberg Gallery. New York (120 Wooster St. 10012): Howard Greenberg Gallery, 1995. OCLC 60806856
  - Exhibition held Sep 15 – November 4, 1995. Organized by Richard Lorenz in association with the Imogen Cunningham Trust.
- Cunningham, Imogen. Imogen Cunningham: Vintage Photographs 1910–1973. New York: John Stevenson Gallery, 2006. OCLC 74329609
  - Exhibition catalog: September 2006. Includes CD-ROM.
- Cunningham, Imogen. Imogen Cunningham. Santa Barbara CA: East West Gallery, 2007. OCLC 417028856
  - Catalog of an exhibition titled "Paired: Imogen Cunningham and Rondal Partridge, featuring works by Horace Bristol", held at East West Gallery, Santa Barbara, October 5, 2007, to January 5, 2008.
- Cunningham, Imogen, and Mónica Fuentes Santos. Imogen Cunningham. 2012. ISBN 978-1-938-92206-0 OCLC 827930432
  - Published in conjunction with an exhibition held at Fundación MAPFRE, Madrid, Spain, September 2012 – January 2013, and Kulturhuset, Stockholm, May–September 2013
- Martineau, Paul. Imogen Cunningham: A Retrospective. 2020. ISBN 978-1-60606-675-1
  - Published to accompany an exhibition held at the J. Paul Getty Museum, Los Angeles, CA, March – June 2022, and the Seattle Art Museum, November 2021 – February 2022.

=== Films, videos ===
- Padula, Fred. Two Photographers: Wynn Bullock and Imogen Cunningham. Fred Padula, 1967. OCLC 22168652
- Korty, John. Imogen Cunningham, Photographer. John Korty, 1972. OCLC 5550648
- Cunningham, Imogen, Ann Hershey, and Shera Thompson. Never give up—Imogen Cunningham. New Brunswick, NJ: Phoenix/BFA Films & Video, 1975. OCLC 13289877
  - Features an interview with and autobiographical study of Imogen Cunningham and her photographic work of over 70 years.
- Cunningham, Imogen. Imogen Cunningham at 93. New York: Carousel Films, 1976. Producer, CBS News. OCLC 41486099, 145733485, 317634694
- Cunningham, Imogen, and Meg Partridge. Portrait of Imogen. Valley Ford, CA: Distributed by Pacific Pictures, 1987. OCLC 24305007
  - Photographer Imogen Cunningham presents more than 250 of her own photographs through informal recorded interviews when she was in her late eighties.

== See also ==
- Portrait of Imogen
- Group f/64
