= BeFilm the Underground Film Festival =

BeFilm the Underground Film Festival, also known as BTUFF and originally known as the Tribeca Underground Film Festival (TUFF), was an annual New York-based film festival begun in 2004 and featuring short films in categories such as animation, documentary, experimental, narrative, and, as of 2009, 3-D stereoscopic. It was the first U.S. short film festival to feature a category for 3-D steroscopic films. It focused on a belief that "shorter is better" with films distinguished by genre rather than country and having panels of judges from the within the entertainment industry. It changed its name from the Tribeca Underground Film Festival to BeFilm at the request of the Tribeca Film Festival. Some of its films have gone on to receive further recognition, such as West Bank Story which in 2007 won an Oscar for Best Live Action Short Film.
