= Rondal Partridge =

American photographer (1917–2015)

Rondal Partridge (September 4, 1917 – June 19, 2015) was an American photographer. After working as an assistant to well-known photographers Dorothea Lange and Ansel Adams in his youth, he went on to a long career as a photographer and filmmaker.

== Early life ==
Partridge was born in San Francisco in 1917. He had a twin brother named Padraic. His parents were etcher Roi Partridge and photographer Imogen Cunningham. He grew up in a household where he was constantly exposed to the influence of several great California artists of the early 20th century. For example, at the age of four, he spent time staying at the home of photographer Dorothea Lange and her husband, painter Maynard Dixon. Lange was embarrassed that Dixon taught Partridge an "obscene verse", and then encouraged him to recite it in front of guests. Partridge became so close to Lange that their relationship was often compared to a son's relationship with his mother.

== Assistant to Dorothea Lange and Ansel Adams ==
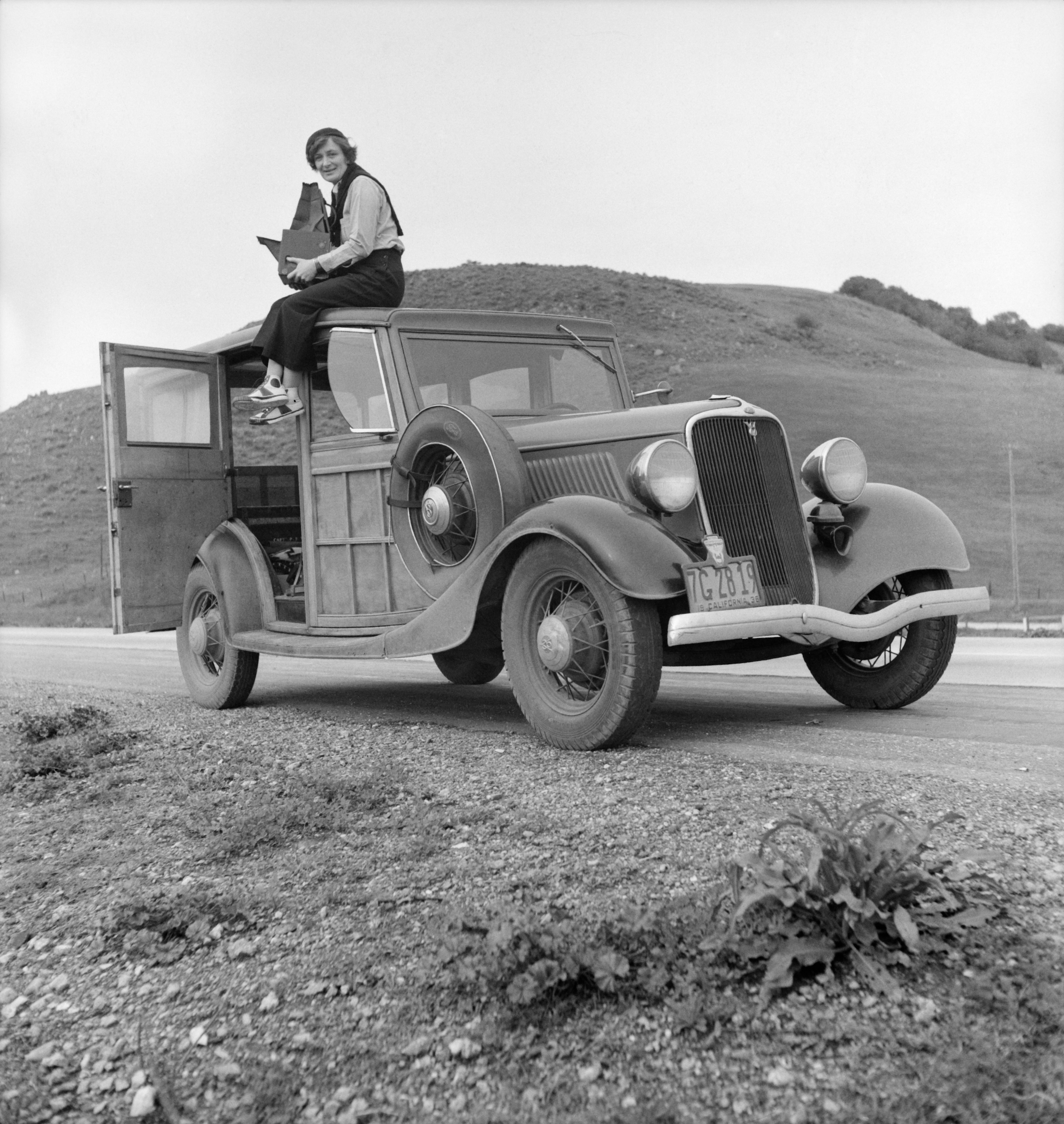
A 1935 photo by Partridge of Dorothea Lange

Partridge began assisting his mother in her darkroom when he was five years old. At the age of 16, he became photographic assistant to Dorothea Lange, when she got a job taking pictures documenting rural poverty for the Resettlement Administration, a New Deal agency of the U.S. government. Lange paid Partridge one dollar a day plus expenses to be her driver and darkroom assistant, and he often spent the night outdoors in a sleeping bag while she slept in a bed in a motel. Lange was paid four dollars a day.

From 1937 to 1939, he worked as an assistant to Ansel Adams in Yosemite National Park. He operated Adams' new automated darkroom in Yosemite Village, which produced photographic prints of Adams' work for sale to tourists.

In July, 1937, Edward Weston, who had received a one-year Guggenheim Fellowship to photograph the American West, arrived in Yosemite. Adams had organized an excursion to the High Sierra, hiring three mules at Red's Meadow to take the party to the Minarets and Devils Postpile National Monument. Partridge accompanied and assisted the party. Other members of the group included Charis Wilson (later Weston's wife), climber David Brower (later executive director of the Sierra Club) and another climber, Morgan Harris. After a week of taking photos and battling mosquitoes, the group returned to Yosemite Valley late at night on July 27. As they were eating a dinner of roast chicken, they learned that Adams' new darkroom in an adjacent building was on fire. Partridge and others battled the flames until the fire was extinguished. Although thousands of negatives were lost, many masterpieces were saved. The fire had been caused by negligence by a photo technician sent by the Zeiss camera company.

== Career as a photographer ==
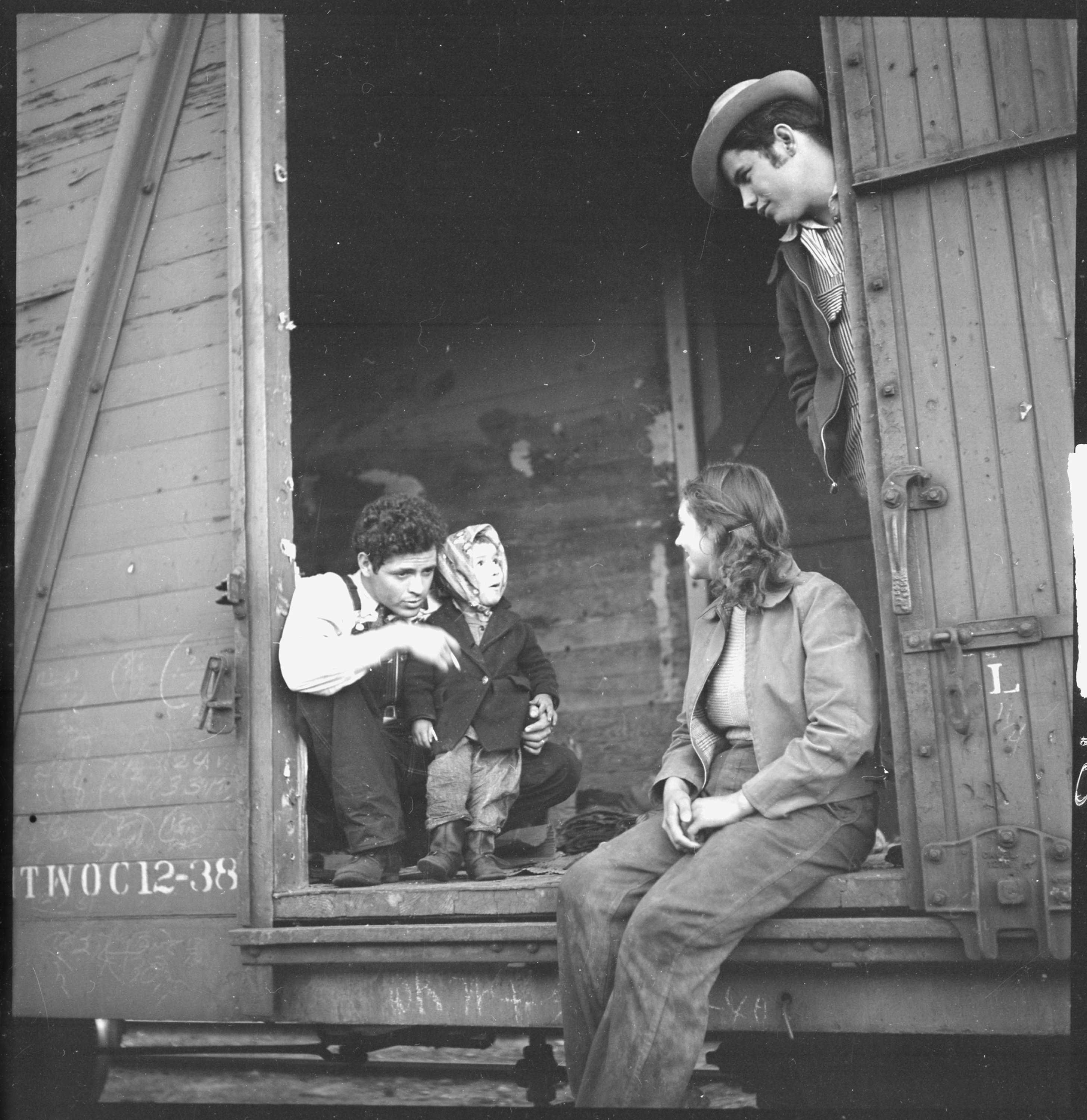
A 1940 photo by Rondal Partridge of a migrant farmworker family riding a freight train in Roseville, California

In 1940, he got a job with a New Deal agency called the National Youth Administration, documenting the problems faced by young people in the final years of the Great Depression.

In contrast to Adams, whose work focused on the beauty of the natural landscape, Partridge documented the human built infrastructure of Yosemite, as well as changes to the built environment of the San Francisco Bay Area. An example of such work is his mid 1960s photograph Pave It and Paint It Green. The photo shows iconic Yosemite peak Half Dome in the background, while the foreground consists of a parking lot filled with cars. In the photo, "the distinction between city and wilderness has disappeared". Partridge also made a documentary film of the same name, which was shown on television. Adams, who did not appreciate irony or social commentary in photography, disapproved of Partridge's 1960s work in Yosemite, although he later called Partridge a "fine photographer" in his autobiography.

Partridge has taken portraits of ordinary working people, as well as many notable people including Odetta, Ruth Asawa, Judy Dater, Peter Scott Lewis, John Carl Warnecke, Dorothea Lange, Ansel Adams and Diego Rivera as well as his mother, Imogen Cunningham.

Partridge's photo Pave It and Paint It Green was part of an exhibition on the art of Yosemite which appeared at the Autry National Center, the Oakland Museum of California, the Nevada Museum of Art and the Eiteljorg Museum of American Indians and Western Art from 2006 to 2008. 21st Editions published a platinum portfolio of his work in 2012, The Symmetry of Endeavor, which includes 12 prints plus a vintage print from his personal archive. Partridge died on June 19, 2015, at the age of 97.
