= Model (art) =

Person who poses for a visual artist

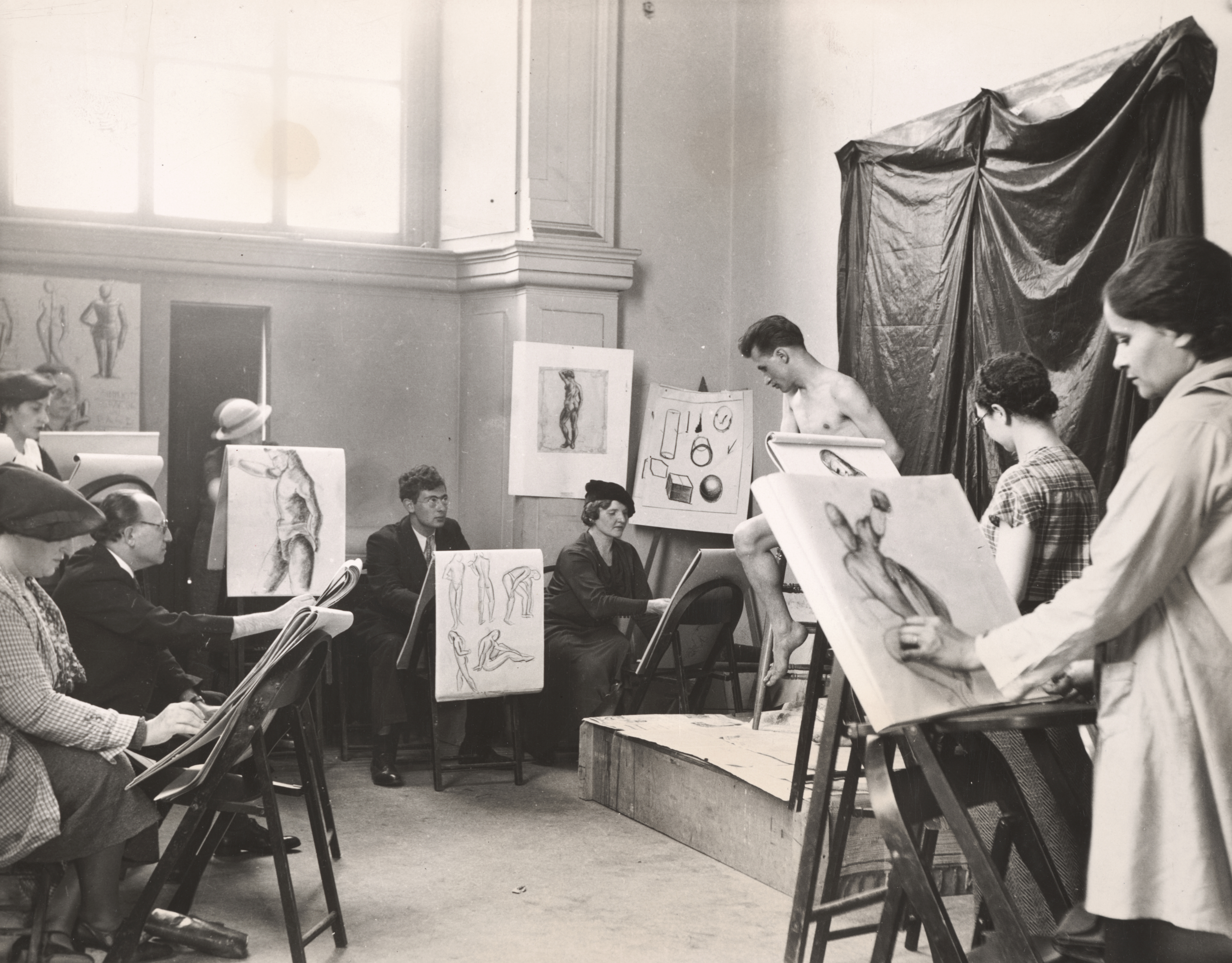
A life class for adults at the Brooklyn Museum, under the auspice of the New York City WPA Art Project (1935)

An art model is a person who poses, often nude, for visual artists as part of the creative process, providing a reference for the human body in a work of art. The importance of the human figure in Western art begins with the Ancient Greeks, which was rediscovered in the Renaissance, art modelling then becoming an occupation. With few exceptions, models remained anonymous until the 19th century.

Modern nude models have most often been employees of art schools, and paid by the hour to pose. As an occupation, modeling requires the often strenuous 'physical work' of holding poses for the required length of time, the 'aesthetic work' of performing a variety of interesting poses, and the 'emotional work' of maintaining a socially ambiguous role. While the role of nude models is well-established as a necessary part of artistic practice, public nudity remains transgressive, and models may be vulnerable to stigmatization or exploitation.

== Role of the model ==
Contemporary art models are most often paid professionals with skill and experience. Rarely employed full-time, they must be gig workers or independent contractors if modeling is to be a major source of income. Models are most frequently employed by institutions of higher learning, other art schools, or by informal groups of artists that gather to share the expense of a model. Models are also employed privately by professional artists. Although commercial motives dominate over aesthetics in illustration, its artwork commonly employs models. For example, Norman Rockwell employed his friends and neighbors as models for both his commercial and fine-art work.

In the second half of the 20th century, the dominance of abstraction in the art world reduced the need for models by professional artists except for the remaining representational artists. However, drawing from life remained an important part of the training needed for a complete visual arts education at the majority of art schools. In the 21st century, art modeling has expanded from educational settings to non-traditional art spaces and sometimes bars, blurring the line between art and entertainment. With the increasing presence of sexual imagery in popular culture, effort is required to maintain the desexualized context of nude modeling in studio classes.

=== Training and selection ===
In some countries there are figure model guilds that concern themselves with the competence, conduct and reliability of their members. An example is the Register of Artists' Models (RAM) in the United Kingdom. Some basic training is offered to beginners and membership is by audition – to test competence, not to discriminate on grounds of physical characteristics. RAM also acts as an important employment exchange for models and publishes the 'RAM Guidelines', which are widely referred to by models and employers. A similar organization in the United States, the Bay Area Models Guild in California, was founded in 1946 by Florence Wysinger Allen. Groups also exist in Australia and Sweden. These groups may also attempt to establish minimum rates of pay and working conditions, but only rarely have models been sufficiently organized to go on strike.

=== Diversity of models and students ===
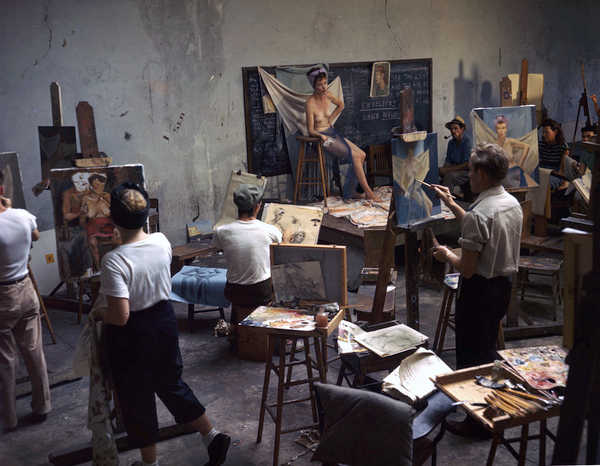
Art students working with a semi-nude female model

Unlike commercial modeling, modeling in an art school classroom is for the purpose of teaching students of art how to draw humans of all physical types, genders, ages, and ethnicities. The minimum age for life models in the United States is usually 18. Younger children are not good candidates for art modeling since they are not able to stay still.

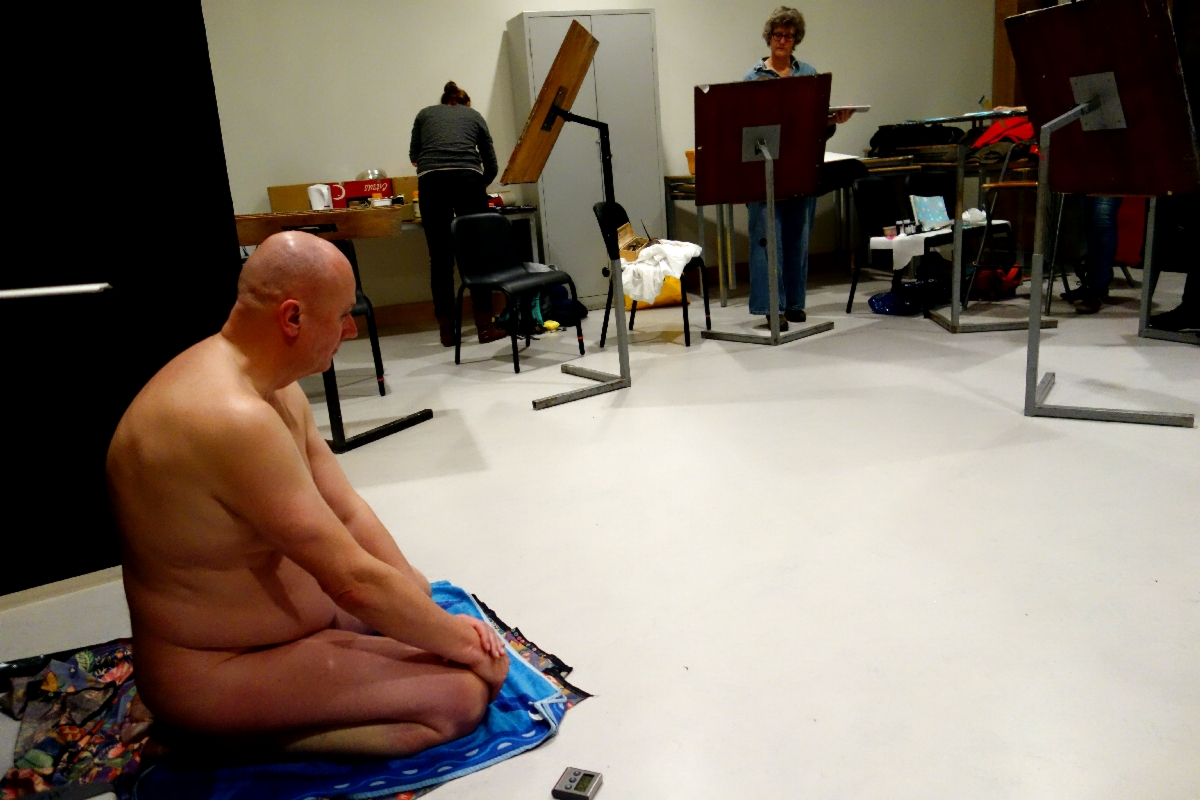
Man as life model in Netherlands

Gender roles and stereotypes in society are reflected in different experiences for male and female art models, and different responses when those not in the arts learn that someone is a nude model. However, both male and female models tend to keep their modeling careers distinct from their other social interactions, if for different reasons. Attitudes toward male nudity, issues of homosexuality when male artists work with male models, and some bias in favor of the female form in art may lead to less opportunity for male models. Works of art that include male nudity are much less marketable.

Figure on Diversity is an organization that seeks to diversify the field of figurative representation in art education by leading workshops for models and artists. Founded in Boston in 2018, it has since moved to Florida, but has an increasing presence online.

=== Working as a model ===
Posing nude can be both physically and emotionally challenging, but Sociologist Sarah Phillips reported that some who tried modeling casually found it to be rewarding, and then sought to learn more about the job. Some had previously taken an art class and seen other models, but others had relied upon fine-art museums and books for suggestions on how to pose.

==== Physical work ====
While posing, a model is expected to remain essentially motionless, and return to the same pose after a break. While holding a pose, models generally do not talk, and should not be spoken to by students, maintaining the serious atmosphere of the studio. Poses can range in length from seconds to many hours—with appropriate breaks—but the shortest is usually one minute. Short dynamic poses are used for gesture drawing exercises or warm-ups, with the model taking strenuous or precarious positions that could not be sustained for a longer pose. Sessions proceed through groups of poses increasing in duration. Active, gestural, or challenging standing poses are often scheduled at the beginning of a session when the models' energy level is highest. Specific exercises or lesson plans may require a particular type of pose, but more often the model is expected to do a series of poses with little direction. The more a model knows about the types of exercises used to teach art, the better they become at posing. Occasionally a pose will cause unexpected problems, such as constricting blood flow that could result in a model passing out. While the first time posing may cause anxiety, most continue due to the relatively high pay. The most significant characteristic of the job mentioned by models is the physical exertion required.

Poses fall into three basic categories: standing, seated and reclining. Within each of these, there are varying levels of difficulty, so one kind is not always easier than another. Artists and life drawing instructors will often prefer poses in which the body is being exerted, for a more dynamic and aesthetically interesting subject. Common poses such as standing twists, slouched seated poses and especially the classical contrapposto are difficult to sustain accurately for any amount of time, although it is often surprising what a skilled model can do. The model's level of experience and skill may be taken into account in determining the length of the posing session and the difficulty of the poses. A typical short-pose session may begin with five or ten gestures, followed by two 5-, two 10-, and five 25-minute poses separated by five-minute breaks.

Models usually pose on a raised platform called the model stand or dais. When artists are working standing at easels, a model stand is essential to avoid a distorted perspective. If the model is posed standing on the floor, the artist should draw while seated. In sculpture studios this platform may be built to rotate periodically through the session to allow for a 360° view for every artist. Long poses are generally required for painting (hours) and sculpture (perhaps days).

==== Aesthetic work ====
When modeling for the same group, new poses are expected at each session. Most models learn on the job, but many have experience in the performing arts, athletics, or yoga that provide a basis for posing, such as strength, flexibility, and a well-developed sense of body position.

==== Emotional work ====
Sexuality is an issue in an art studio where naked models are present, and has become more so with the sexualization of the body in contemporary cultures. The traditional definition of the situation in art studios has been that the nudity of models is functional, not sexual. The norms and behaviors that support this understanding included models being naked only while posing, quickly disrobing/robing and not interacting with others while naked. This understanding is less strict when student artists are also models, either in classes or posing for each other outside of class. The other aspect of sex in the arts is gender, including feminist critiques of the performance of gender in the classroom and representations of gender in figurative works.

A common experience for young first-time participants in a figure class, both models and students, is overcoming anxiety for the initial session due to preconceptions regarding public nudity.

== Public perception ==
Much of the public perception of art models and their role in the production of artworks is based upon mythology, the conflation of art modeling with fashion modeling or erotic performances, and representations of art models in popular media. One of the perennial tropes is that in addition to providing the physical form for humans in an artwork, models may be thought of as muses, or sources of inspiration without whom the art would not exist. Another popular narrative is the female model as a male artist's mistress, some of whom become wives. None of these public perceptions include the professional model's own experience of modelling as work, the performance of which has little to do with sexuality.

=== In popular media ===
After becoming a celebrity in the early 1910s by posing nude for many of the notable public sculptures in the United States, Audrey Munson appeared in four films in which she portrayed a model, appearing fully nude in some, partially nude in others. In her first film Inspiration (1915), Munson's role was that of a muse for a young artist who later married her. The lack of sexual impropriety established a precedent for the National Board of Censorship to allow or reject nudity in later films. Munson's second film Purity (1916) proves more difficult for the censors, containing a more complex allegory. Munson's plays a woman who agrees, after initial refusal, to pose nude for an artist in order to pay for a poet's work to be published in order for them to marry. The moral ambiguity of the nude scenes resulted in sharp difference of opinion between members of reviewing audiences. The result was that by 1917 the renamed National Board of Review would no longer pass films that included female nudity. This certification was not binding, allowing films to be shown in some jurisdictions, but not others.

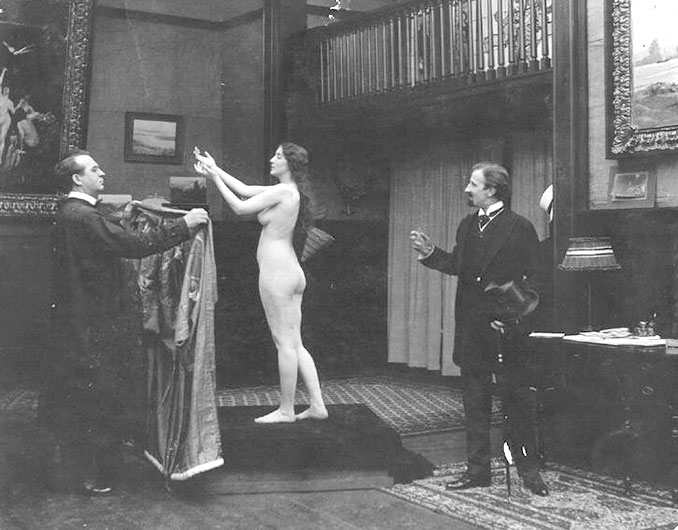
Inspiration (1915) was the first of four films featuring Audrey Munson as a nude model.

Recent films have continued the portrayal of models as muses. In The Artist and the Model (2012), set during World War II, an elderly sculptor is prompted to resume working by the arrival of a beautiful Spanish refugee who is willing to pose. In La Belle Noiseuse (1991) an aging artist is coaxed out of retirement by an aspiring young artist's suggestion that his girlfriend pose nude for a new painting. In the film Camille Claudel (1988); Gérard Depardieu as Auguste Rodin interacts sexually with the nude models in his studio accompanied by Isabelle Adjani as Camille Claudel when she was Rodin's assistant. The story of the sinking of the Titanic is changed from one of pure tragedy to one of female liberation in the 1997 film by James Cameron by focusing on two fictional characters, a young impoverished artist (Jack) who wins his passage in a card game and meets a young woman (Rose) being forced by her mother to marry a rich man that she dislikes. The act that confirms Rose's decision to free herself is posing nude for Jack, which is soon followed by sex.

== Types ==
The major distinction in types of art modeling is between posing for art classes or other groups, usually on an hourly basis, versus posing for an individual artist in the creation of a particular work. The latter may include friends, family, or others with a continuing relationship with the artist. These types apply to all the media, figure drawing, figure painting, sculpture and figure photography.

=== Academic modeling ===
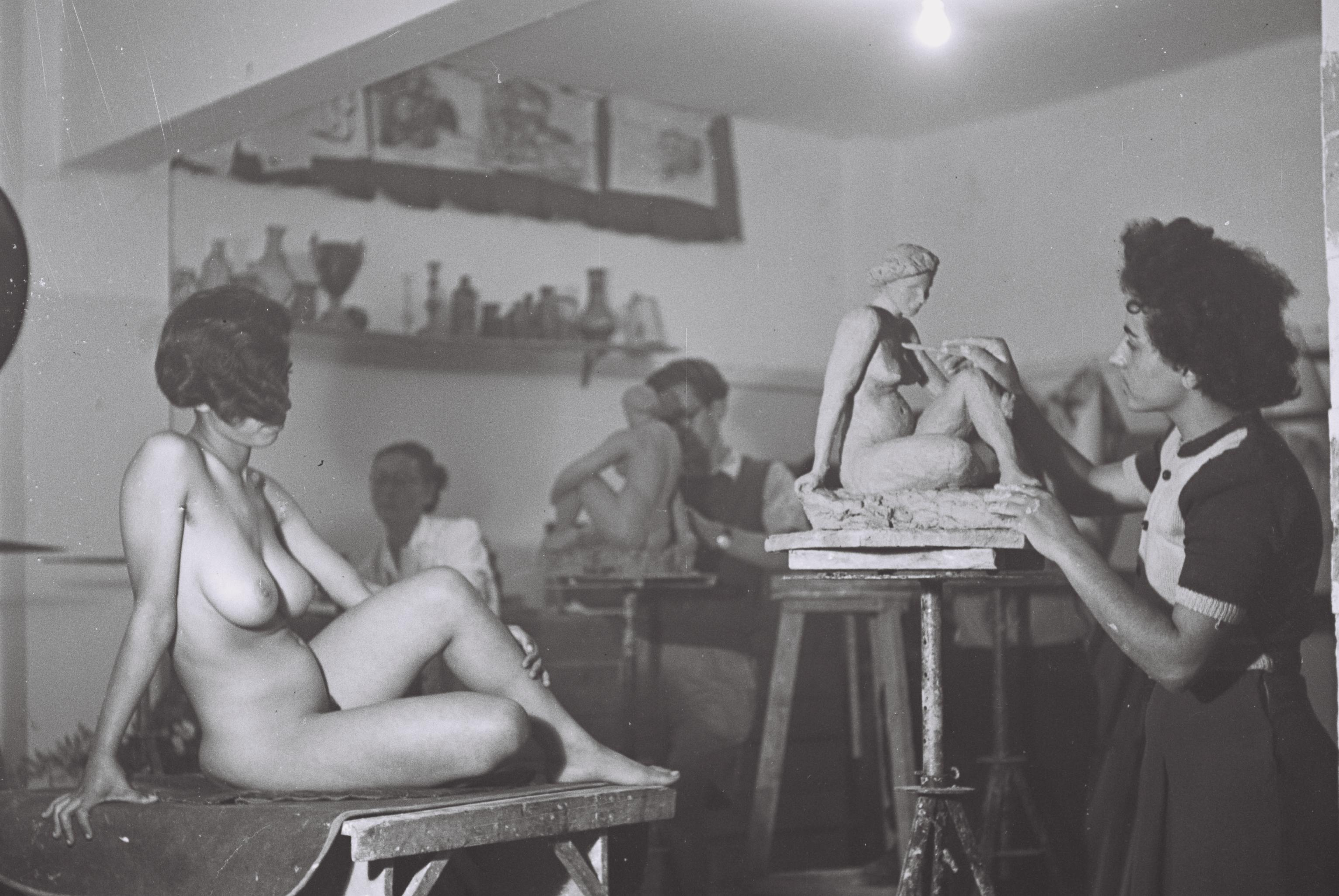
Young artists studying sculpture in Tel Aviv, 1946

Beginning with the Renaissance, drawing the human figure has been considered the most effective way to develop the skills of drawing. The life class became an essential part of the curriculum in art school, allowing students to understand the figure in three dimensions, and to learn about human anatomy. In the classroom setting, where the purpose is to learn how to draw or paint the human form in all the different shapes, ages and ethnicities, anyone who can hold a pose may be a model. In addition to technical requirements, an artist has an emotional or empathic connection to drawing another human being that cannot exist with any other subject.

Given the generally negative view of public nudity, particularly in America, the institutions teaching art must maintain that within the figure studio, nudity is necessary and proper; which sociologist Sarah Phillips called "Establishing that serious work is happening". In some institutions, guidelines for the conduct of all participants in a nude model session may be specified in a handbook, and are observed to maintain decorum and emphasize the serious intent of figure studies. Admission to and visibility of the area where a nude model is posing is tightly controlled. Disrobing is done discreetly, and the model wears a robe when not posing. Models may not be accompanied by non-class members. It is generally prohibited for anyone (including the instructor) to touch a model. Very close examinations are only made with the permission of the model. Some institutions allow only the instructor to speak directly with a model. Experienced models avoid any sexually suggestive poses. Art instructors and institutions may consider the incident of a male model gaining an erection while posing cause for termination, or grounds for not hiring him again. Guidelines at St. Olaf College discourages students making comments on a model's appearance. Photography is generally forbidden.

At many public universities in the United States, "Art Model" is listed in the human resources system as would any part-time temporary job. Job descriptions for modeling posted by art schools list basic requirements of being willing to pose nude or clothed, being able to hold poses for the requested time (from minutes to hours with breaks), and to follow cues from the instructor. These basic requirements hold true at large universities, liberal arts colleges, and schools of art and design. The hourly rate paid by schools for nude modeling may be significantly higher than for clothed modeling.

Sometime modeling jobs are reserved for students. At Indiana University, however, current students at the Eskenazi School of Art, Architecture + Design may not pose nude, but only clothed, while students in other departments may be nude. At other institutions students cannot be models, even if they are not art students, to avoid any possibility of conflict of interest. Some colleges have a model coordinator assigned to supervise the selection and scheduling of models for all classes.

Any of these policies may vary in different parts of the world. In Europe and South America attitudes are more relaxed than in the United States, while in China, Taiwan and Korea attitudes are more conservative. A figure class held in Singapore is conducted as it would be in other parts of the world.

==== High School ====
Mark Graham, Professor of Art Education at Brigham Young University, addresses the issues involved with the inclusion of figure drawing in art education at the high school level. He argues that the human figure remaining one of the significant subjects for artworks requires introduction to both the works and the practice in art classes beginning at an early age.

=== Artist's groups ===
While otherwise similar to art school modeling, events variously called "open studios" or "drop-in sessions" lack instruction. They may be sponsored by arts organizations or galleries, or meet in an artist's private studio or home. Generally the attendees are experienced artists who want to continue the practice of life drawing, sharing the expense of model fees by paying for each session or a series.

In many locations there may be few opportunities for figure drawing, and also few that are willing to model. Those that do so seek an additional source of income, but also find validation in being able to hold poses and contributing to the artistic process. However, they are more likely to avoid letting it be known that they model, given the negative associations toward nudity. The Philbrook Museum of Art in Tulsa, Oklahoma, has been holding a weekly session for as long as anyone can remember. Otherwise a typical open session, a professor at the University of Tulsa offers instruction once each month. The models for these sessions tend to be middle age or older, and the artists are generally experienced drawing nude models with only the occasional new participant.

=== Modeling for individual artists ===
Life study and finished work
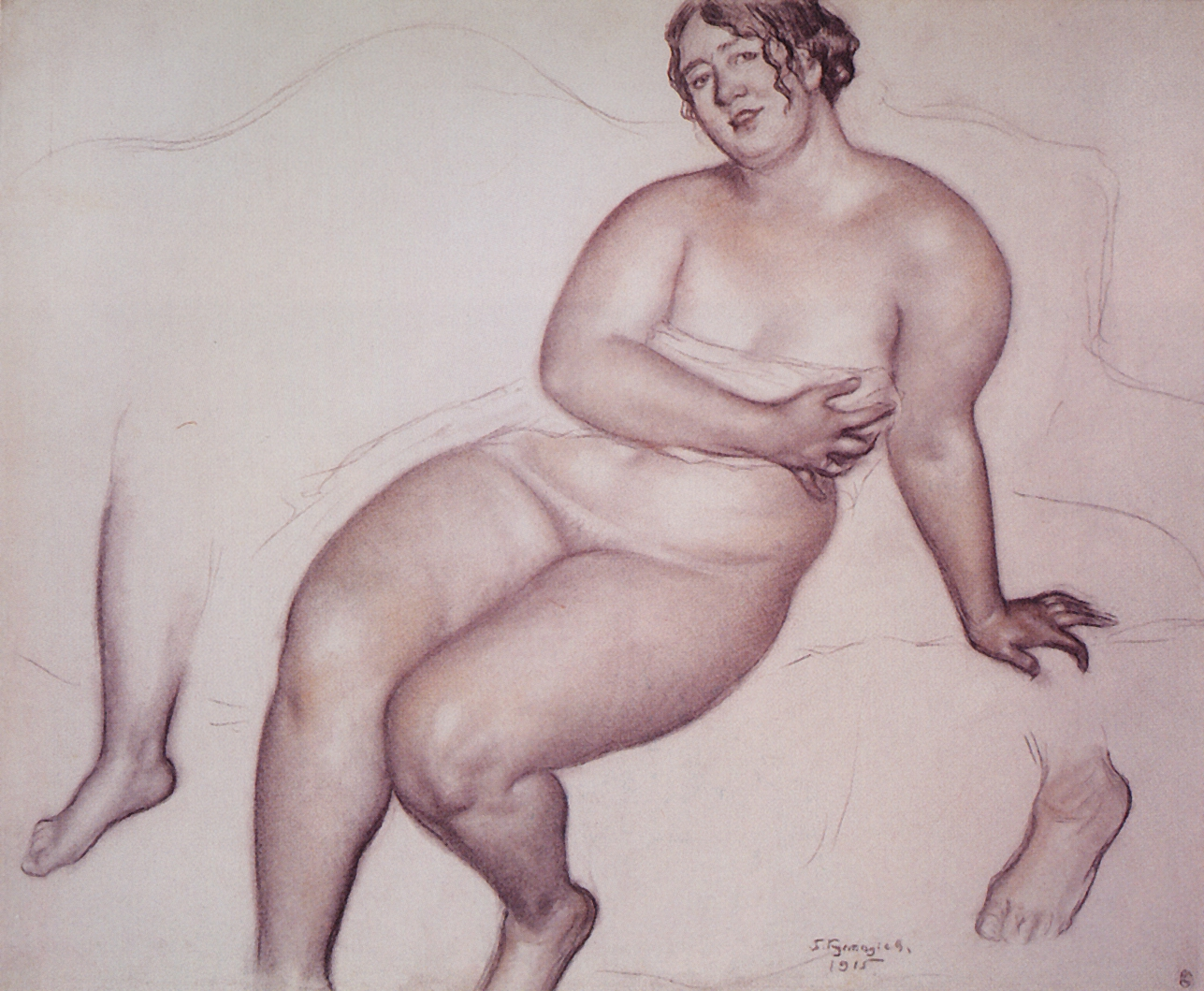
Model (1914), life drawing of actress Faina Shevchenko by Boris Kustodiev

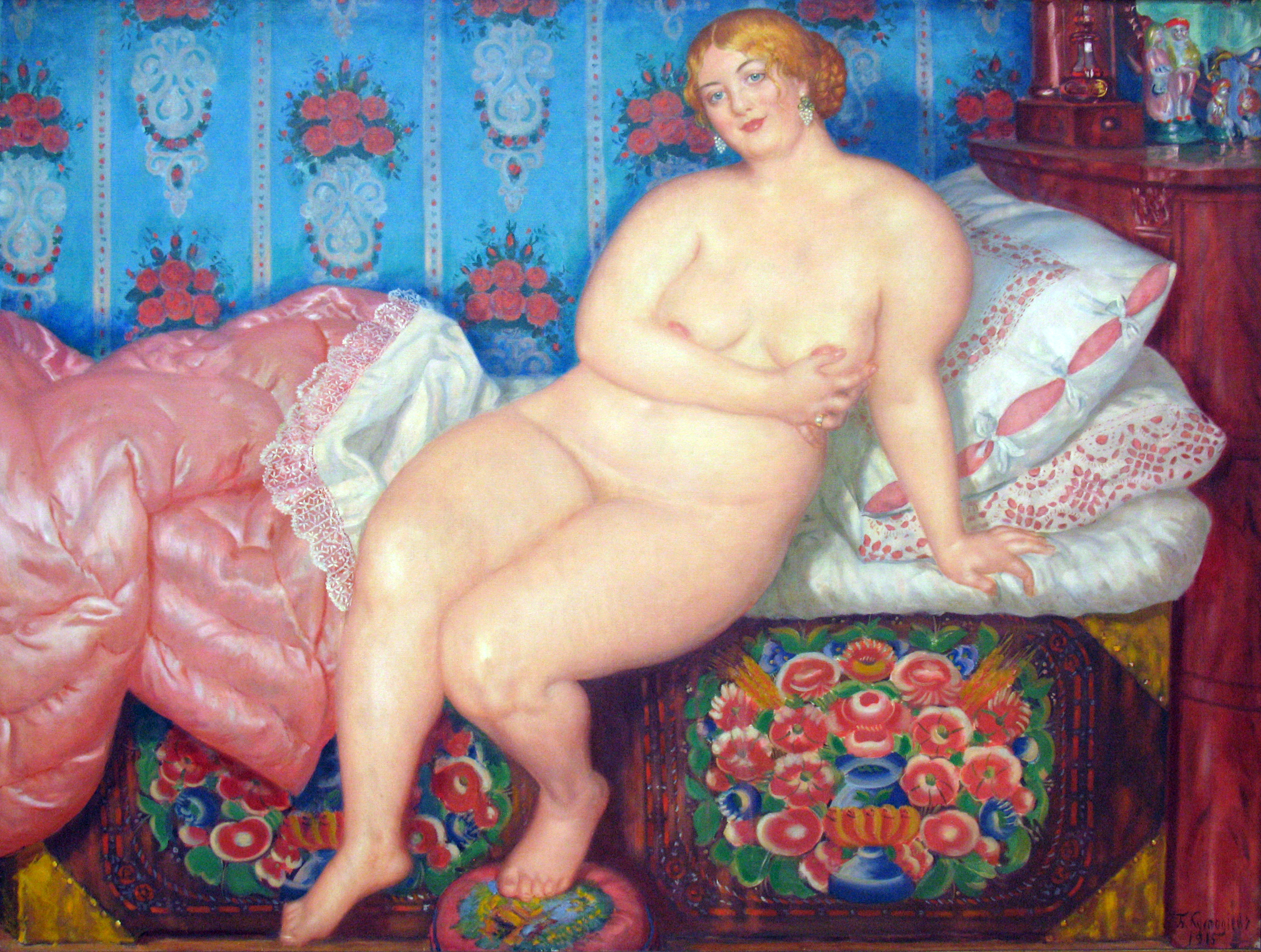
The Beauty (1915), painting based upon the 'Model' drawing

In non-academic settings, models may pose as requested by artists within the limits of the law and their own comfort, including work that requires physical contact with other models, the artist, or the public. French artist Yves Klein applied paint to models' bodies which were then pressed into or dragged across canvas both as performance art and as a painting technique. In 2010 at the Museum of Modern Art, a retrospective of the work of Marina Abramović included two nude models, male and female, standing in a narrow doorway through which visitors passed, replicating a work performed by the artist and a partner in 1977.

Models who work for individual artists in a private studio tend to observe art school norms in order to maintain the definition of modeling as serious artistic work. However, there are no longer strict rules, so a more informal working relationship may be established over time. This may include not undressing in another room, or not wearing a robe during breaks. In addition, silence is no longer necessary if the artist is comfortable working and conversing with the model. A more collegial relationship may develop where artist and model feel that they are collaborating. However, in a private studio environment, with an artist on a deadline or with commission guidelines, stricter work standards may apply regarding punctuality and holding longer, more demanding poses, but also higher rates of pay. However, private studio work is rare outside of major cities.

Chuck Close apologized in 2017 when several women accused him of making inappropriate comments when they came to his studio to pose, but initially denied any wrongdoing. Following his death in 2021, it was revealed that Close suffered from a form of dementia, which could account for his behavior.

"Artist's domestic employees as models"
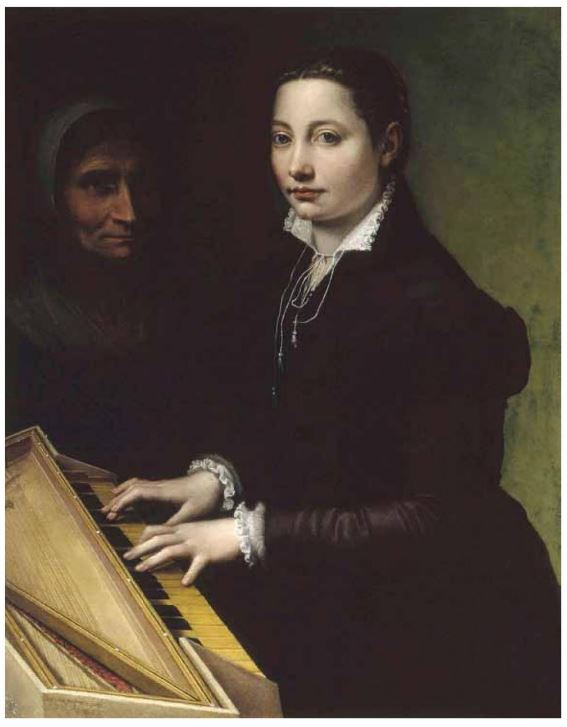
Selfportrait at the spinet with her nursemaid (c. 1555) by Sofonisba Anguissola

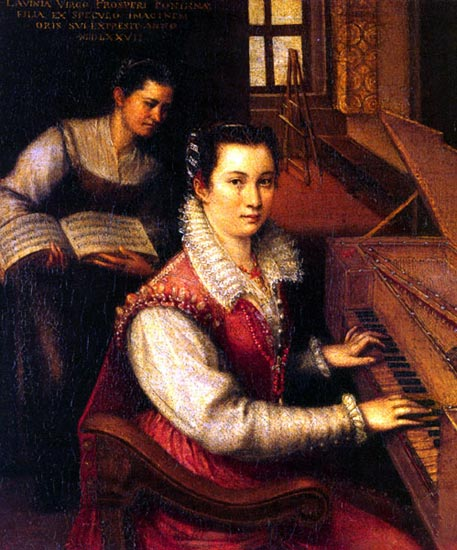
Self-portrait at the Clavichord with a Servant (1577) by Lavinia Fontana

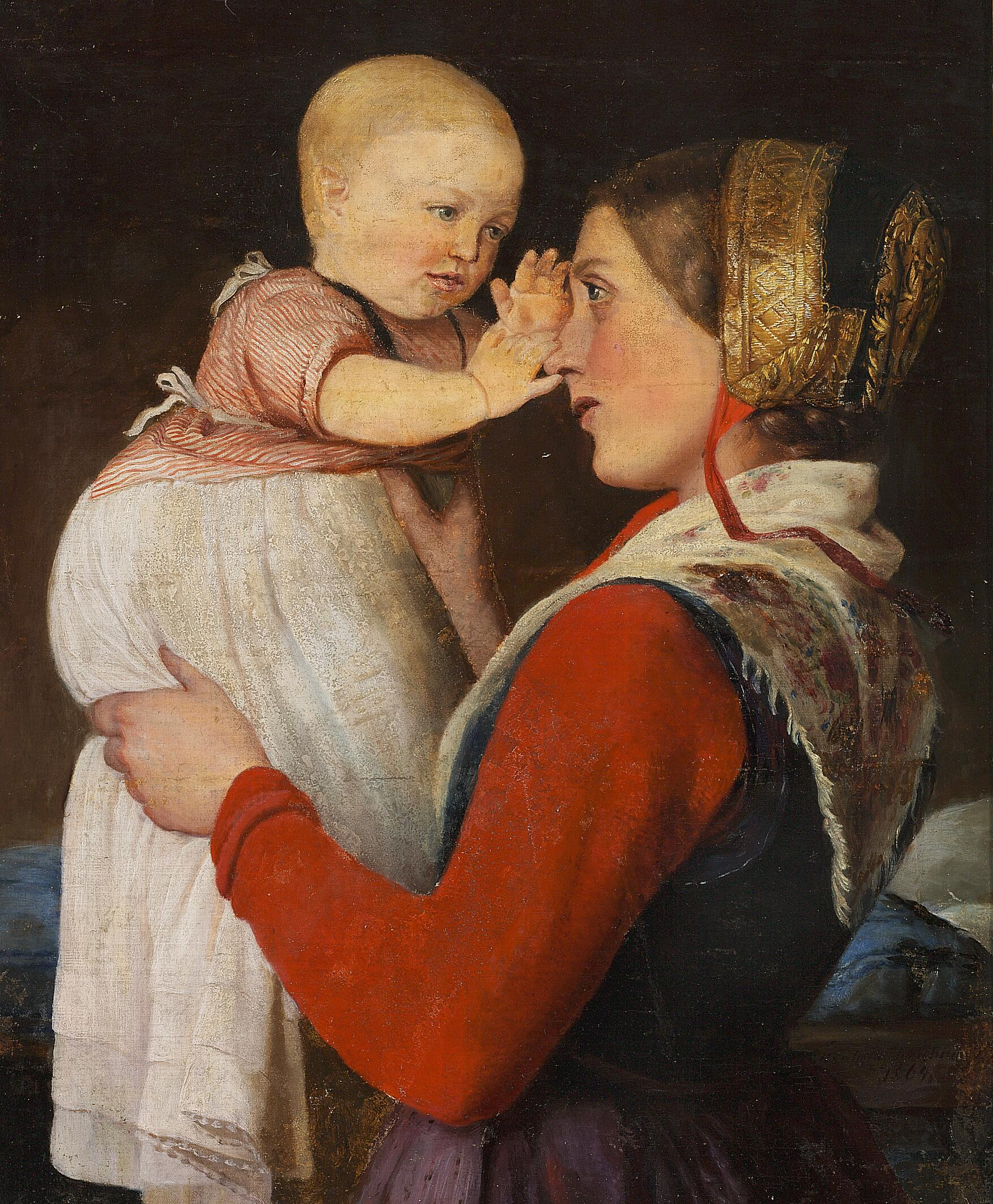
Artist's son Holger Jerichau with his wet nurse (1864) by Elisabeth Jerichau-Baumann

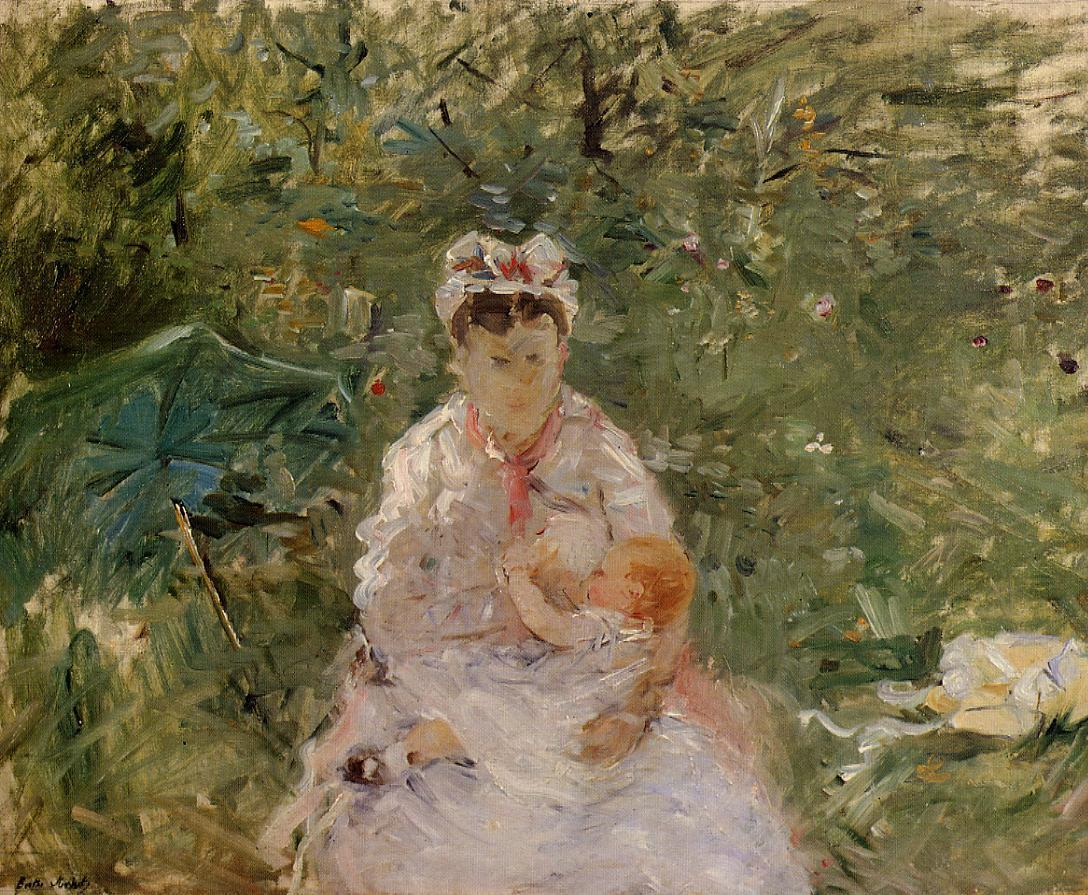
The Wet Nurse Angele Feeding Julie Manet (1880) by Berthe Morisot (It portrays her daughter and her wet nurse.)

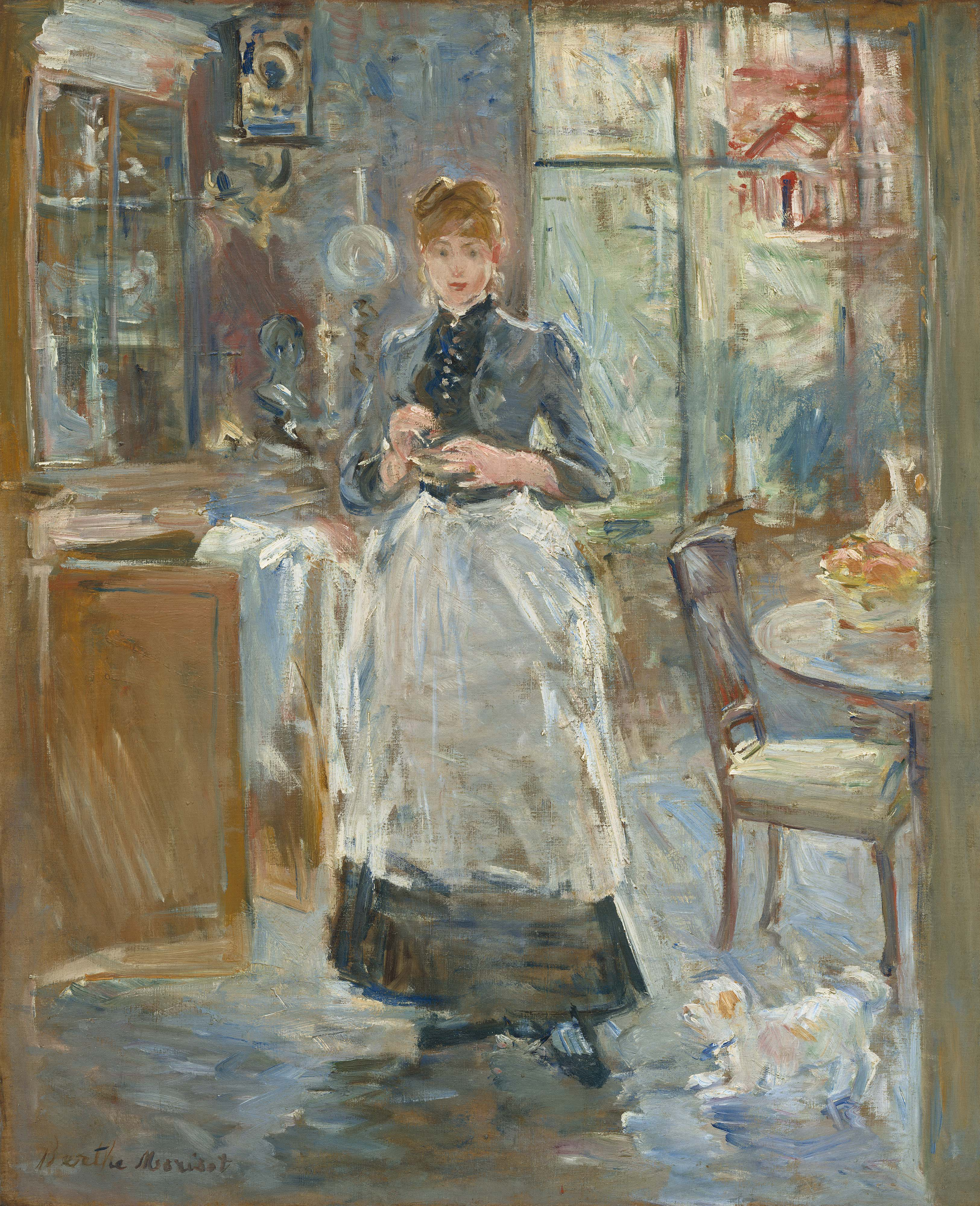
In the Dining Room (1886) by Berthe Morisot (It portrays the artist's maid and her daughter's nanny Pasie.)

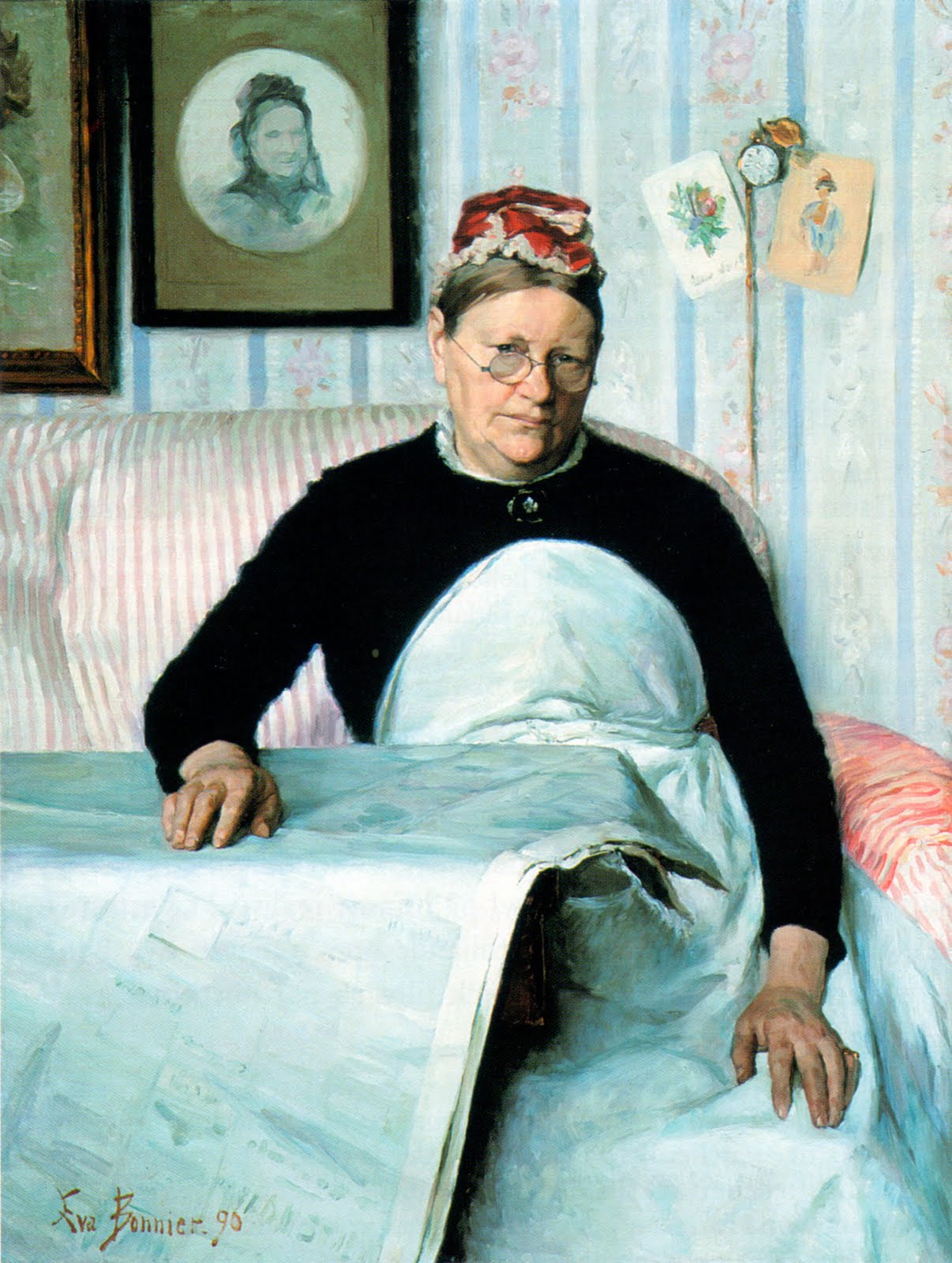
Brita Maria Banck, housekeeper (1890) by Eva Bonnier. The artist portrayed her family's housekeeper.

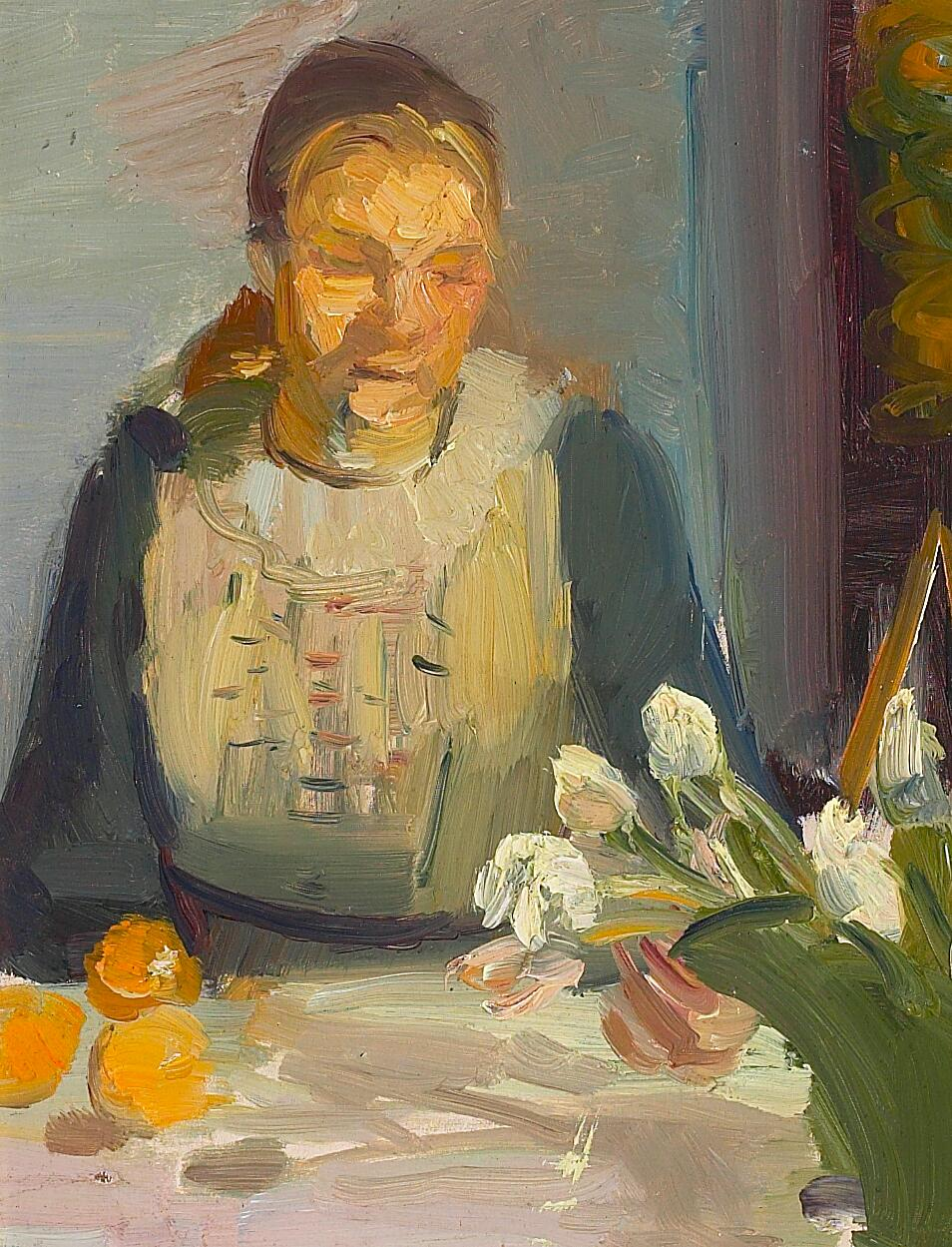
Portrait of Maren Brems sitting at a sunlit table with white and pink tulips in a green vase (c. 1893) by Anna Brøndum-Ancher. The woman in the painting is the artist's maid.

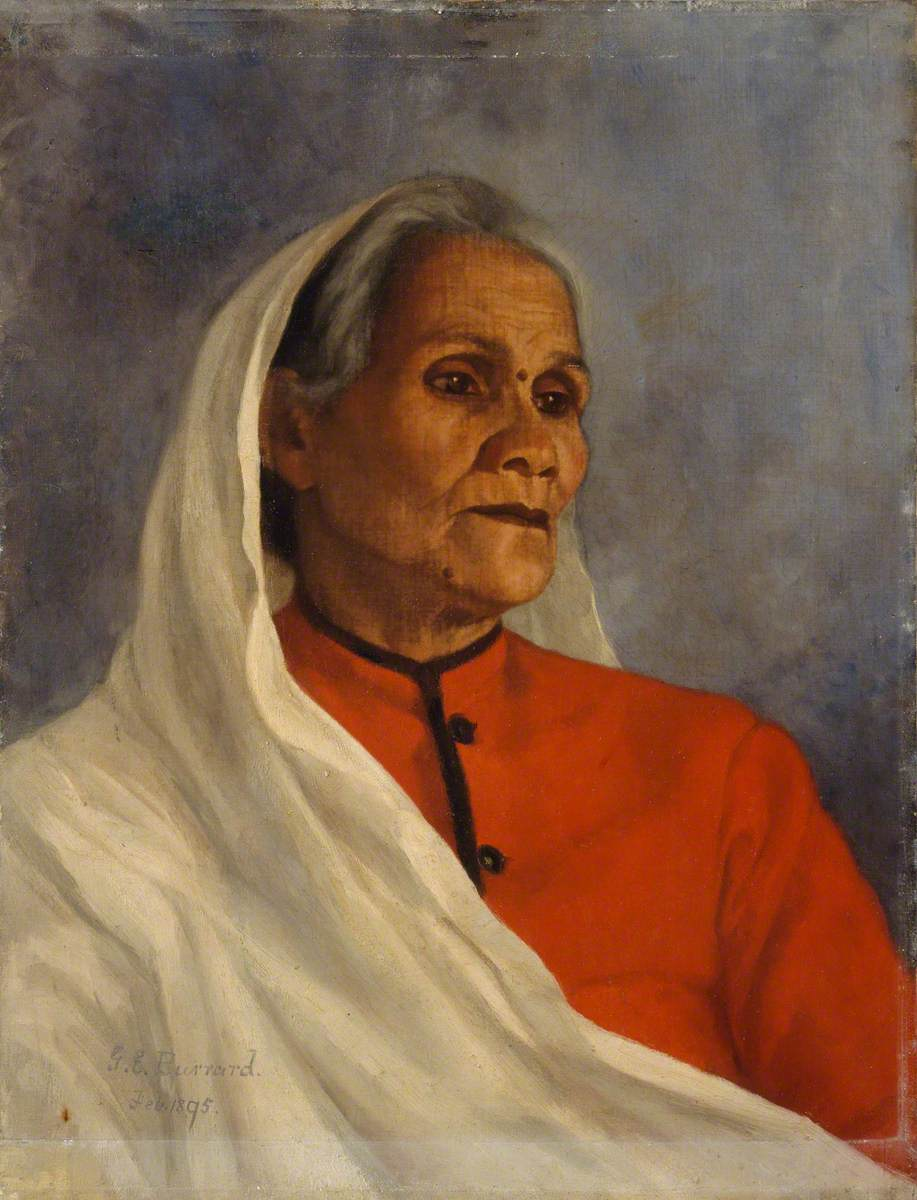
Nussiban, Our Ayah (nanny) (1895) by British painter Gertrude Ellen Burrard

==== Family members, spouses and life partners ====
Through history, artists have used family members as models, both nude and otherwise, in creating their works. The Dutch Golden Age painter Jan de Bray specialized in the portrait historié, "portraits" of historical figures using contemporary figures as models, including himself and his family, as in two versions of The Banquet of Cleopatra (1652 and 1669). French 18th century painter Élisabeth Vigée Le Brun painted many paintings of her daughter, painter Julie Le Brun. Rose Beuret was the subject of several portrait sculptures by Auguste Rodin and his companion for 53 years, but his wife only in the final year of her life. French painter and art collector Julie Manet is a subject of multiple paintings of her mother Berthe Morisot, uncle Édouard Manet, cousin Paule Gobillard and other Impressionist artists. Camille Doncieux, first wife of Claude Monet also posed for paintings by Pierre-Auguste Renoir and Édouard Manet. Hortense Fiquet, companion and later wife of Cézanne is rarely mentioned in art history. Lucian Freud painted many of his 14 children, sometimes nude; the most controversial being his daughter Annie Freud in 1963 when she was 14. However, she now looks back upon posing for her father as a positive experience.

"Artist's wives"
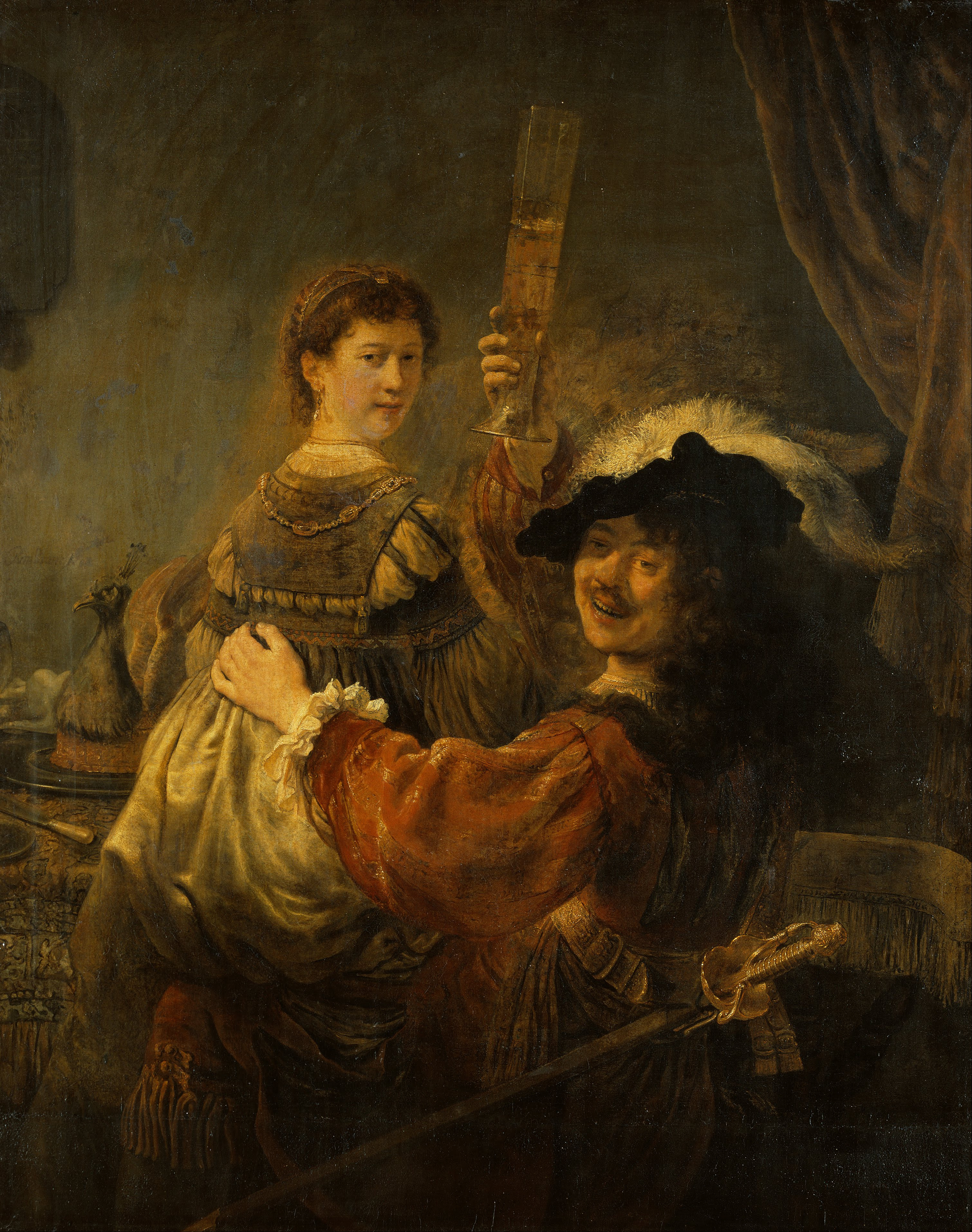
The Prodigal Son in the Tavern by Rembrandt van Rijn depicts the artist and his wife Saskia (c. 1635)

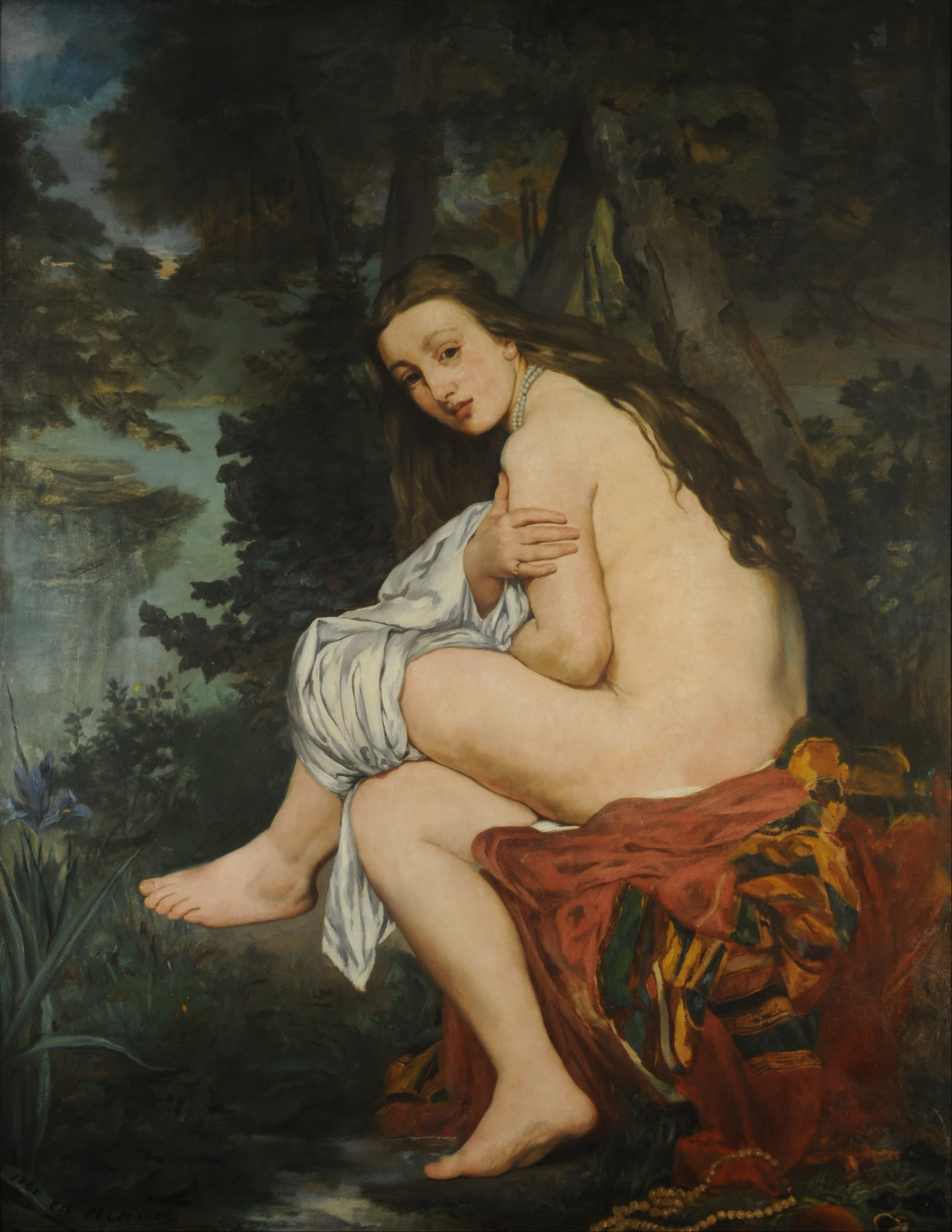
The Startled Nymph (modeled by Suzanne Manet (née: Leenhoff)) by Édouard Manet (1859–1861)

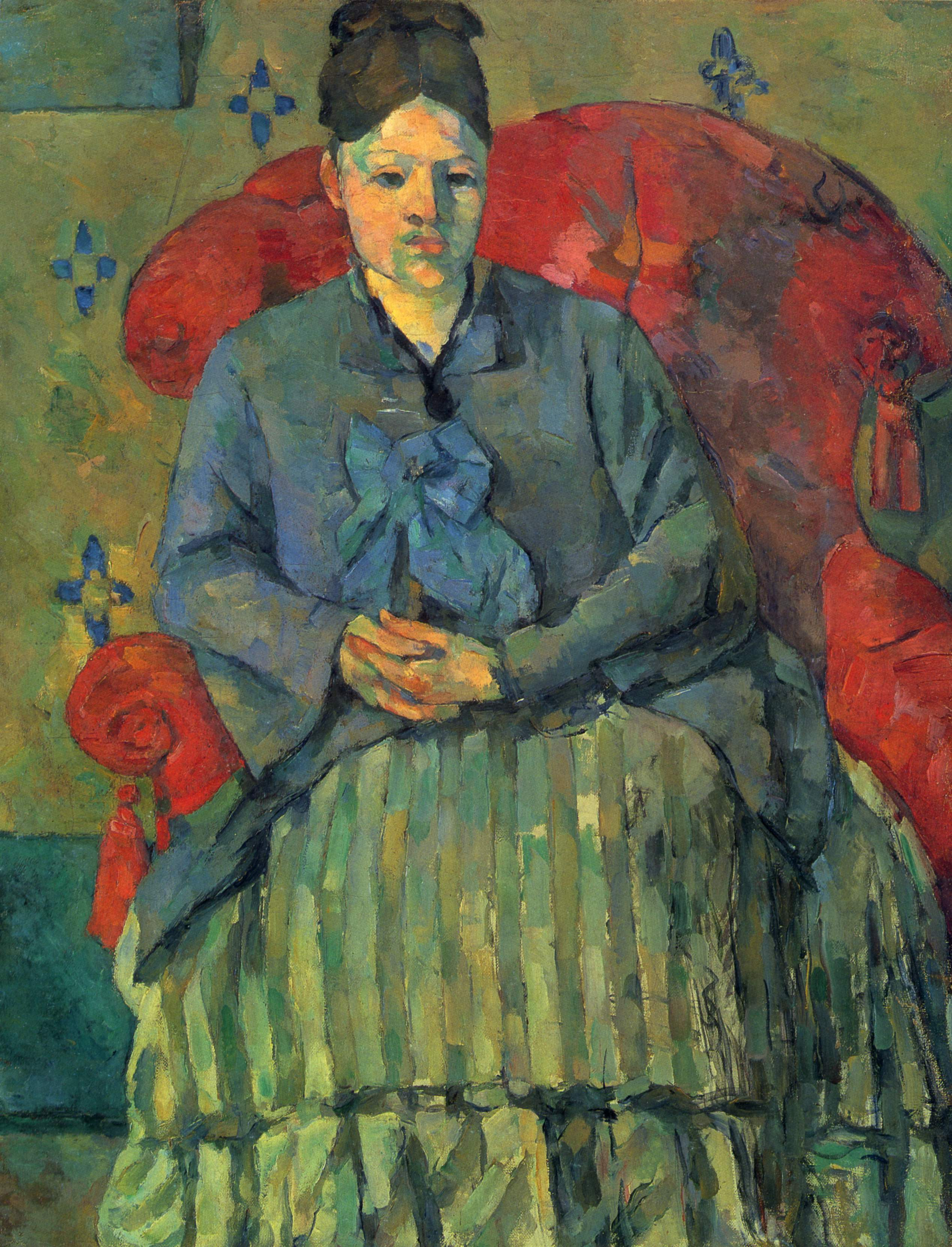
Marie-Hortense Fiquet Cézanne by Paul Cézanne (1877)

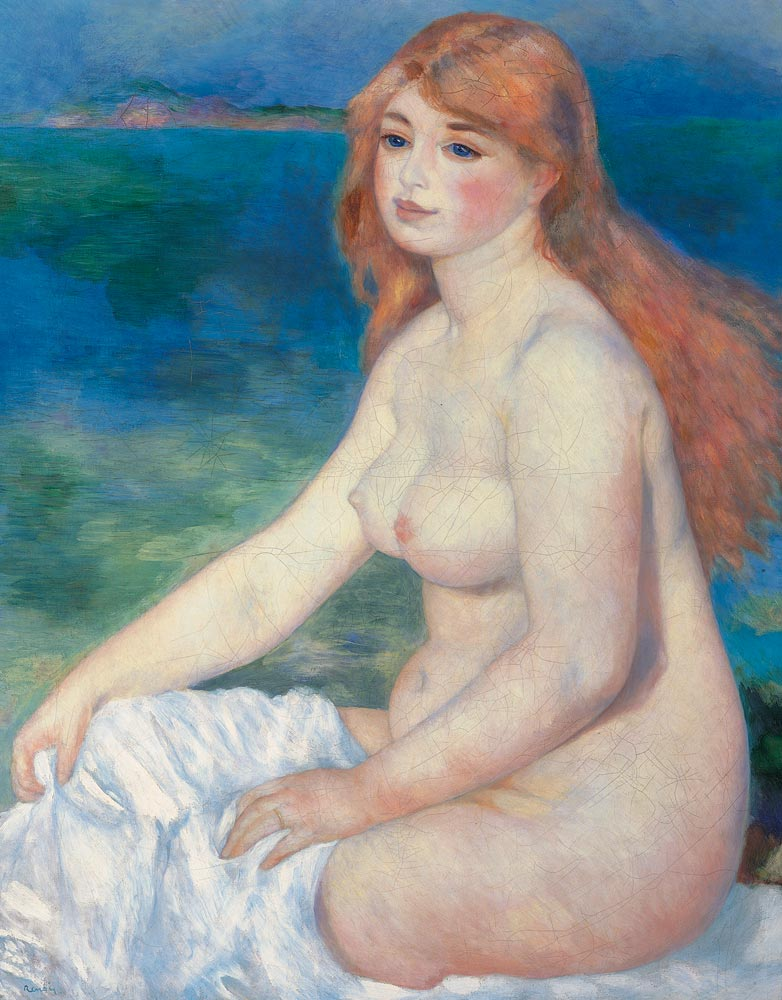
Aline Charigot, La Baigneuse blonde, later became wife of Pierre-Auguste Renoir (1882)

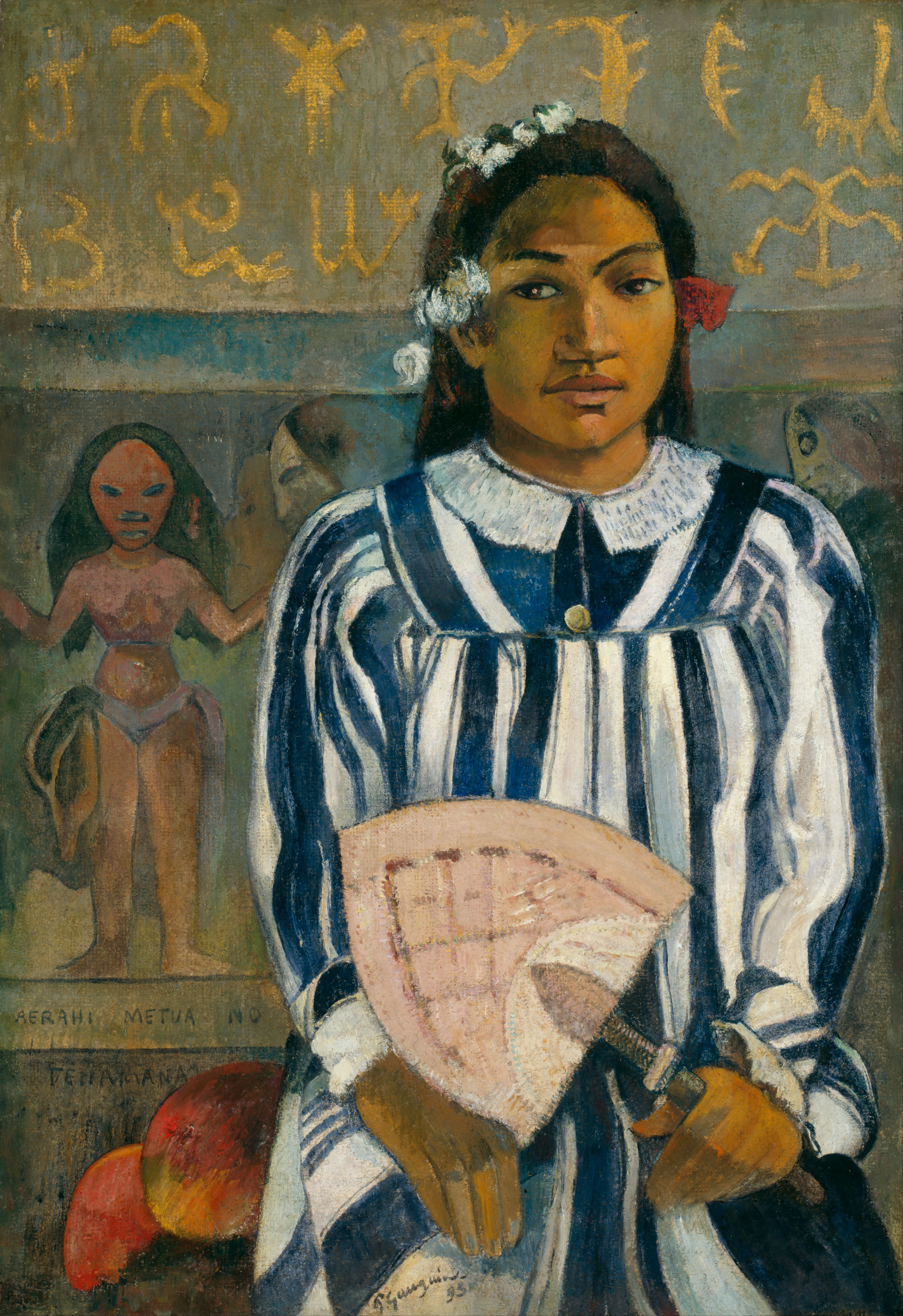
Paul Gauguin portrait of his wife Tehaʼamana (1893)

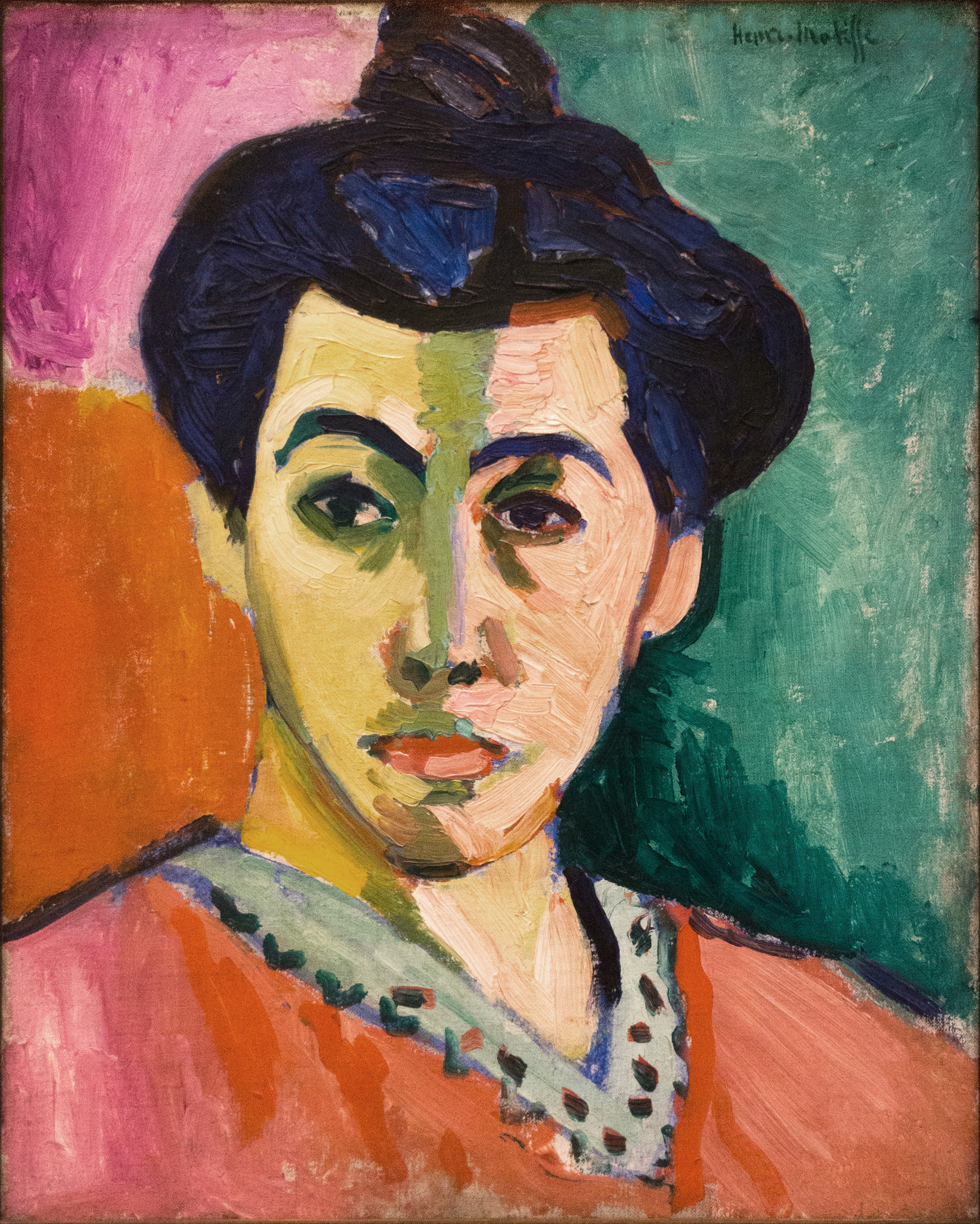
Portrait of Madame Matisse (The green line) (1905)

Portrait d'Olga dans un fauteuil (Pablo Picasso's wife Olga Khokhlova, 1917–1918)

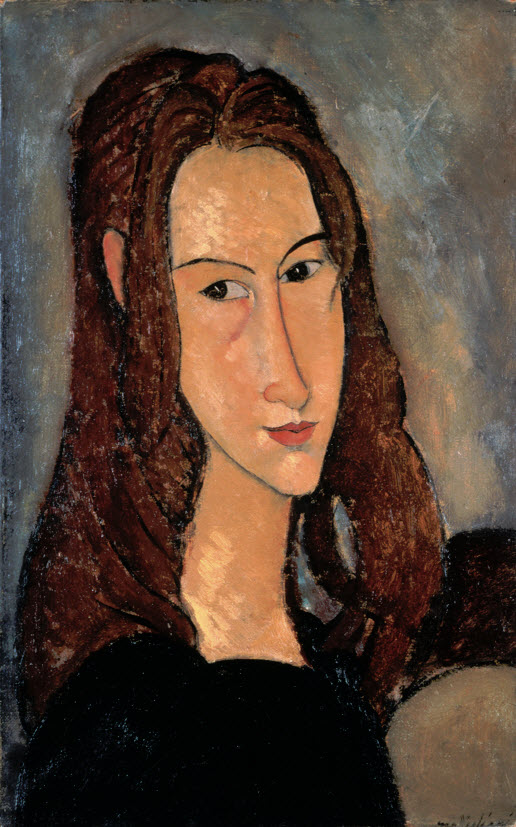
Jeanne Hébuterne by Amedeo Modigliani (1918)
"Artist's husbands"
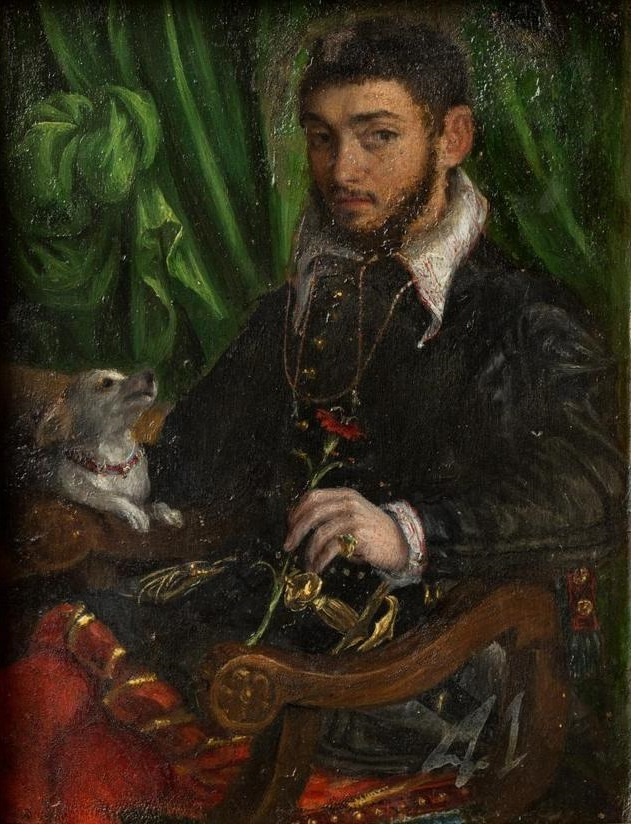
Presumed Betrothal Portrait of artist's future husband Gian Paolo Zappi by Lavinia Fontana

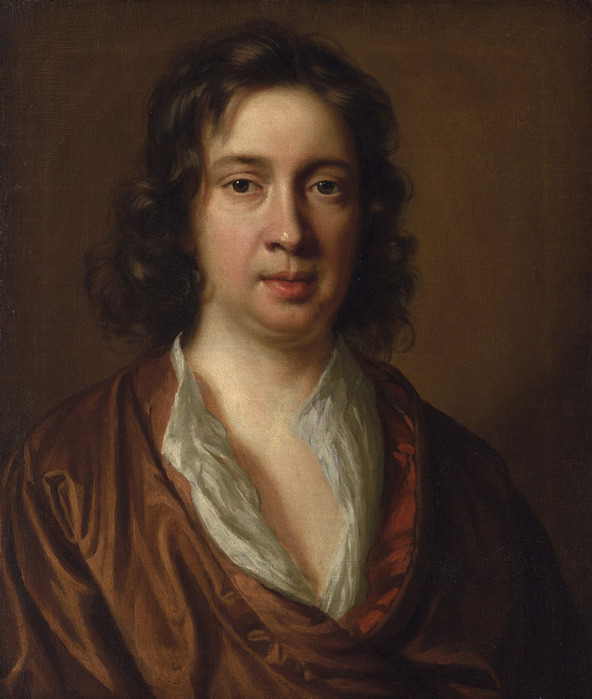
Portrait of Charles Beale, the artist's husband by Mary Beale

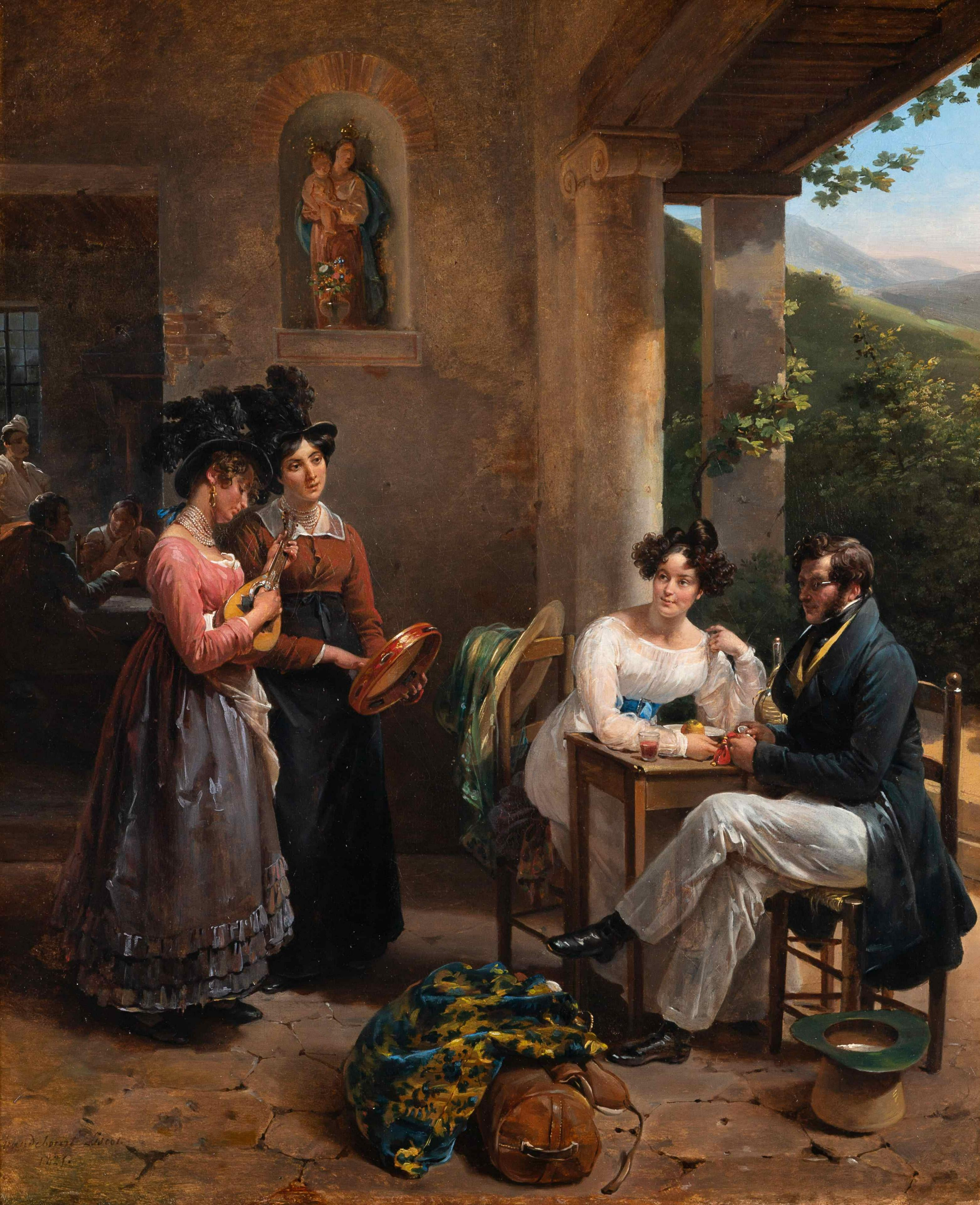
Self-Portrait of the Artist and Her Husband on Their Wedding Trip (1821) by Hortense Haudebourt-Lescot

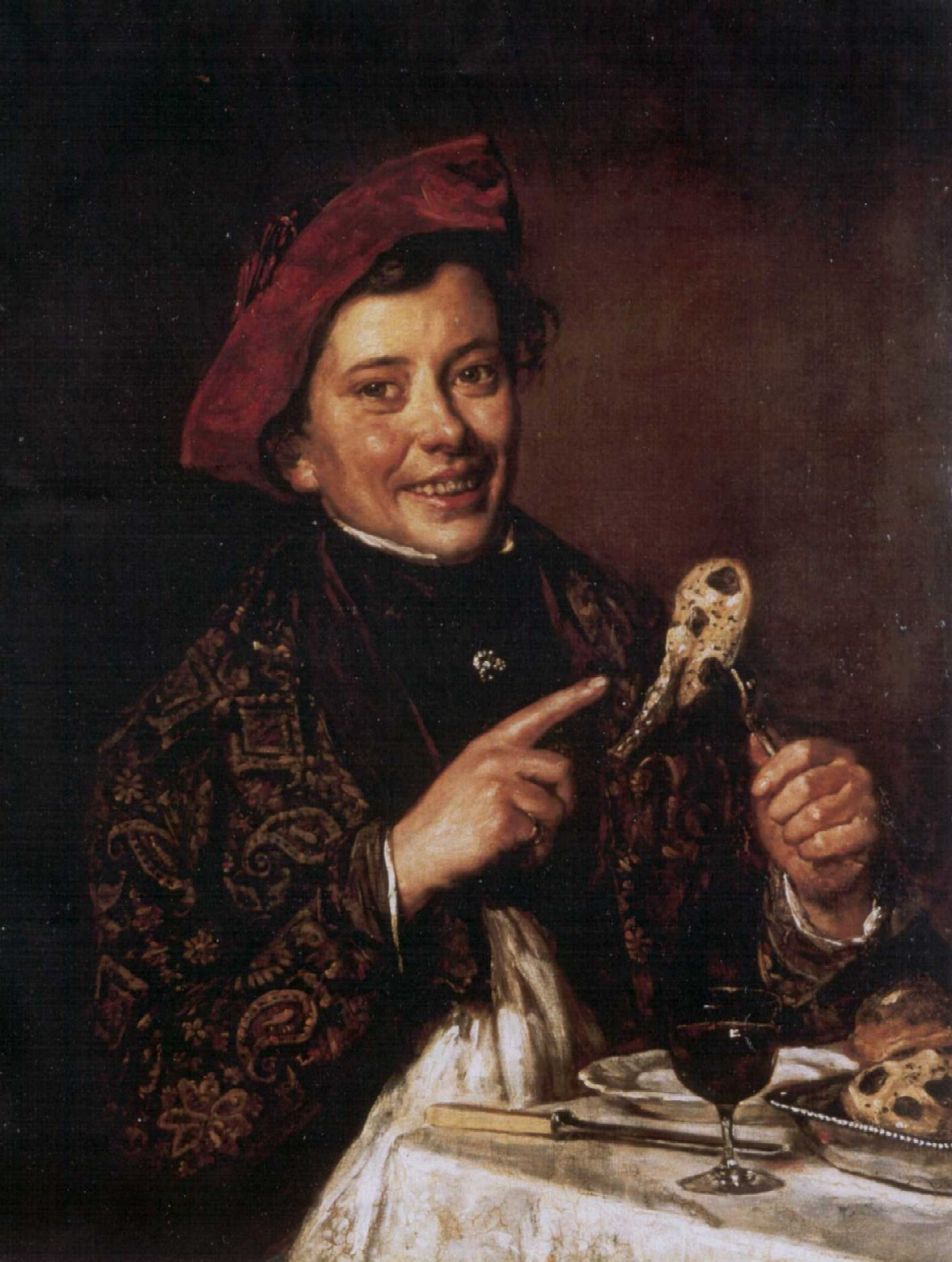
Portrait of Alexis Soyer, the artist's husband (1841) by Emma Jones Soyer

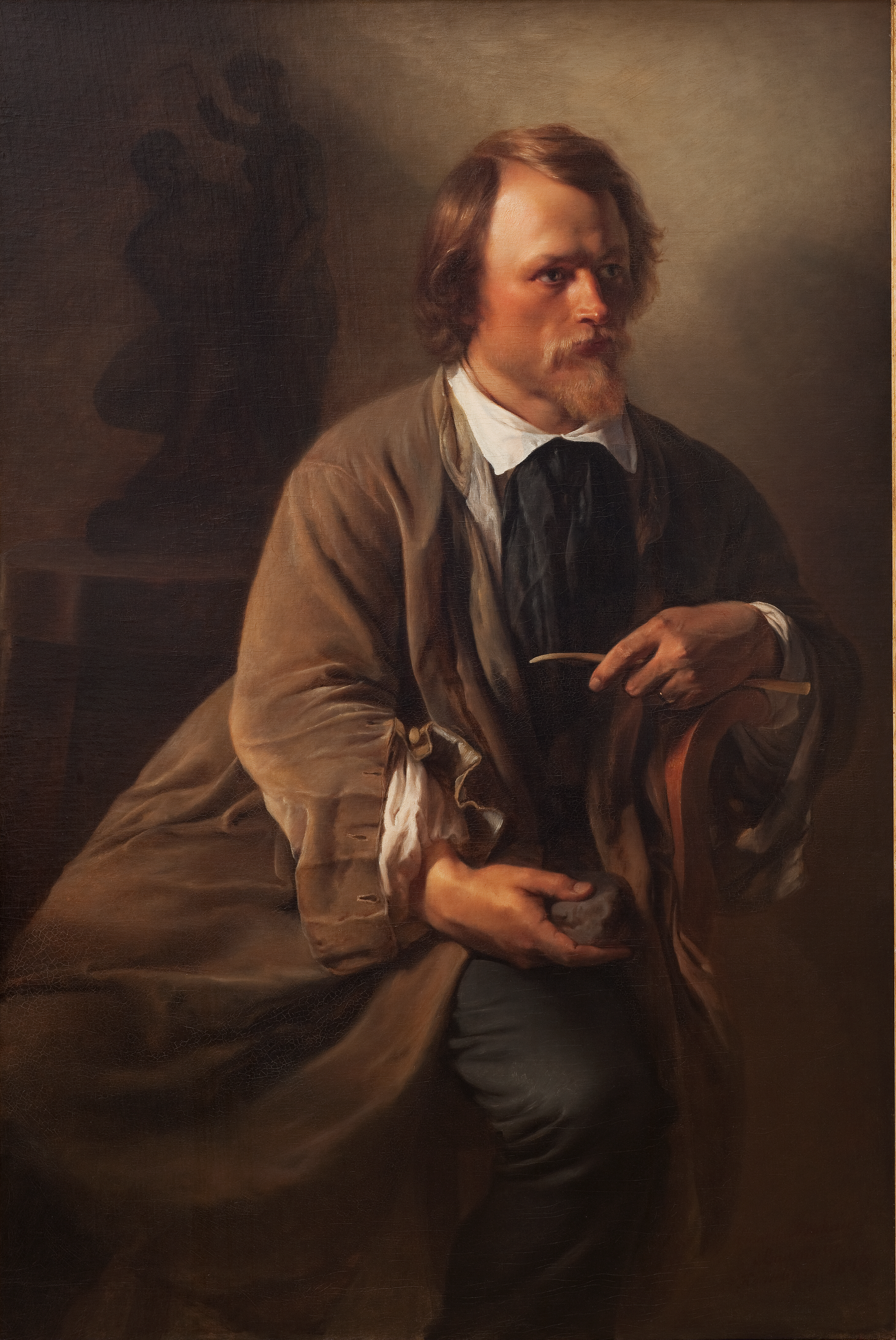
Jens Adolf Jerichau, the Artist's Husband (1846) by Elisabeth Jerichau-Baumann

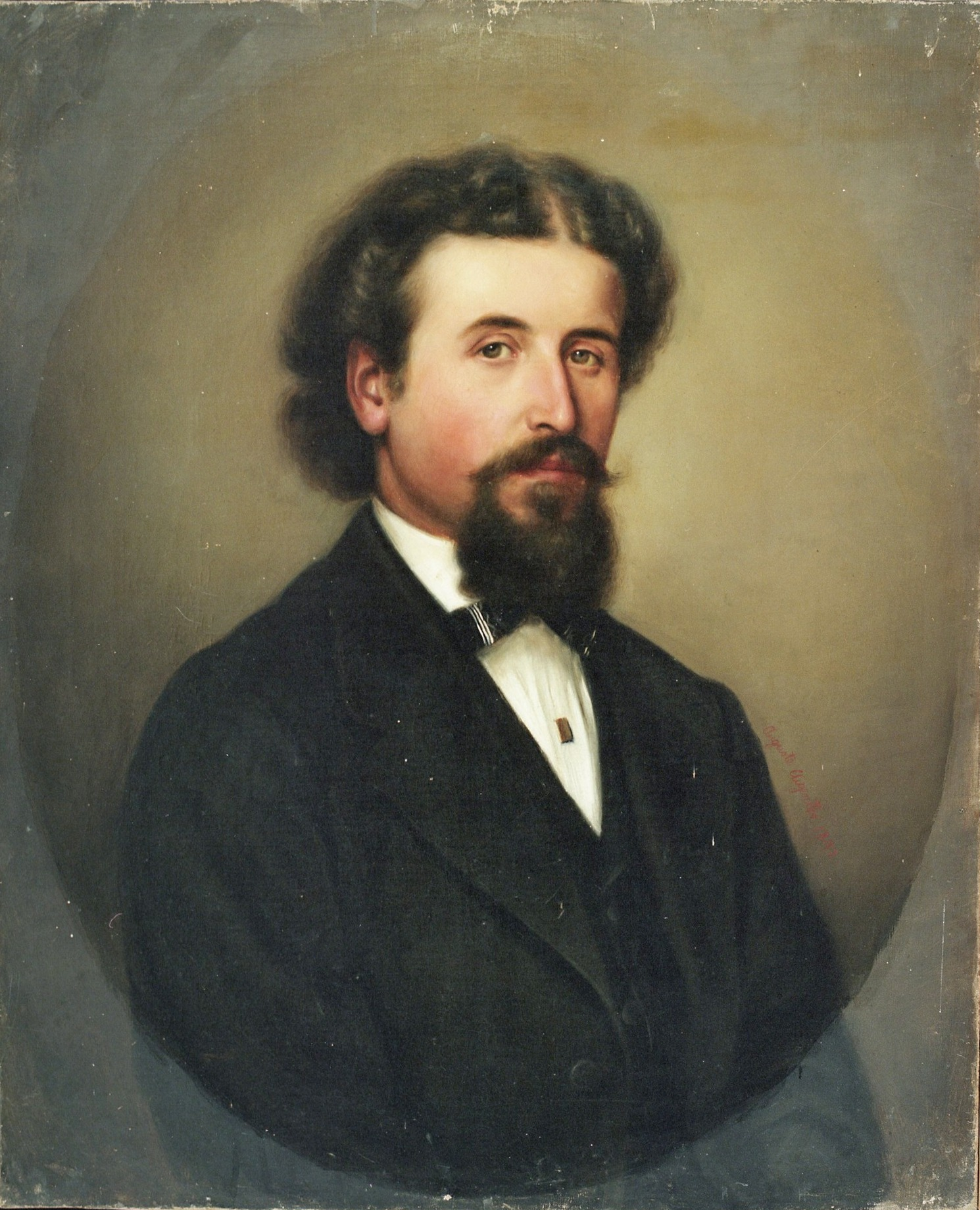
Portrait of Anton Šantel, the artist's husband (1872) by Slovenian painter Avgusta Aigentler Šantel

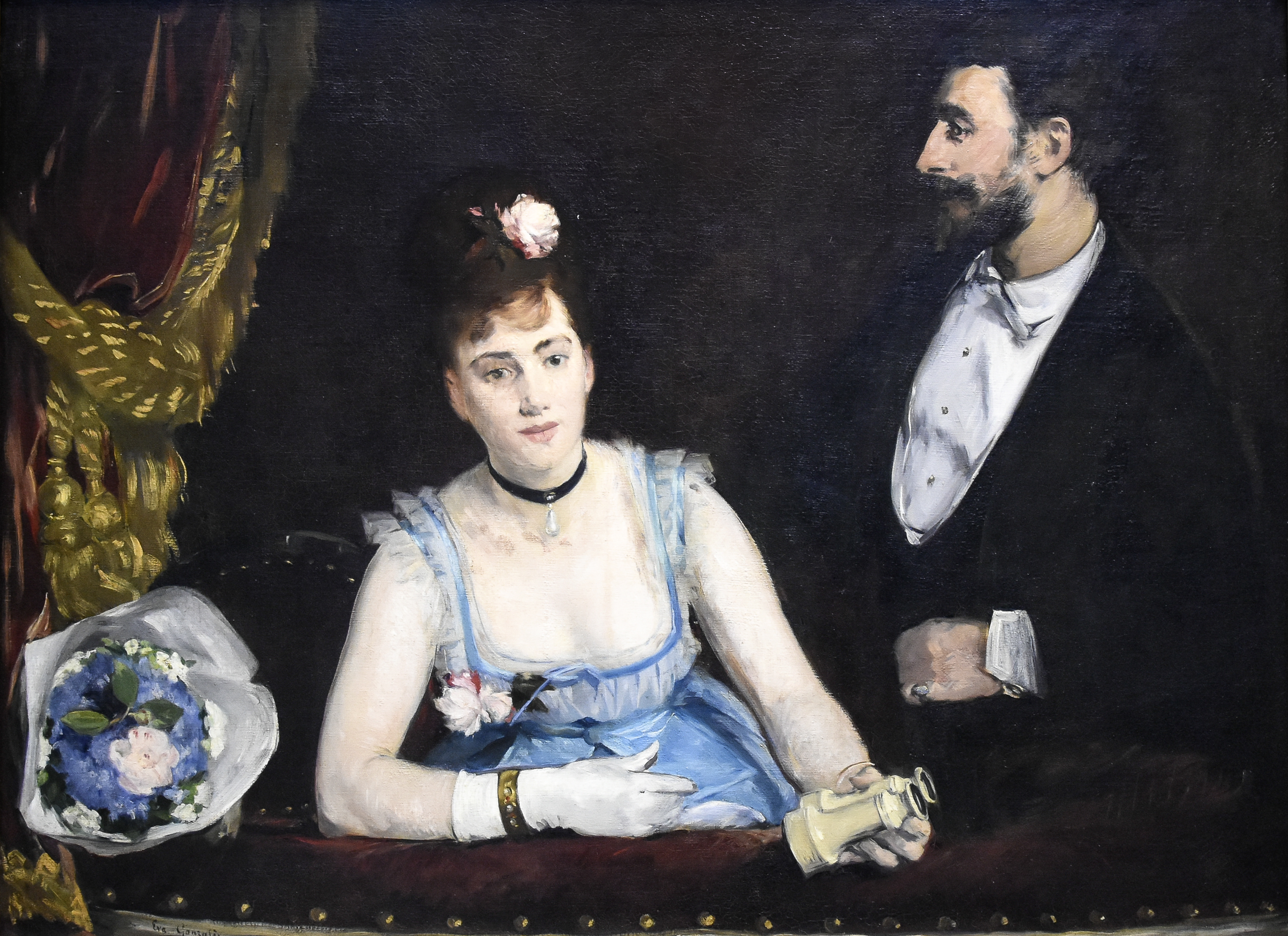
Une loge aux Théâtre Italiens (1874) by Eva Gonzalès. The man in the painting is her future husband Henri Guérard and the woman is her sister Jeanne Gonzalès.

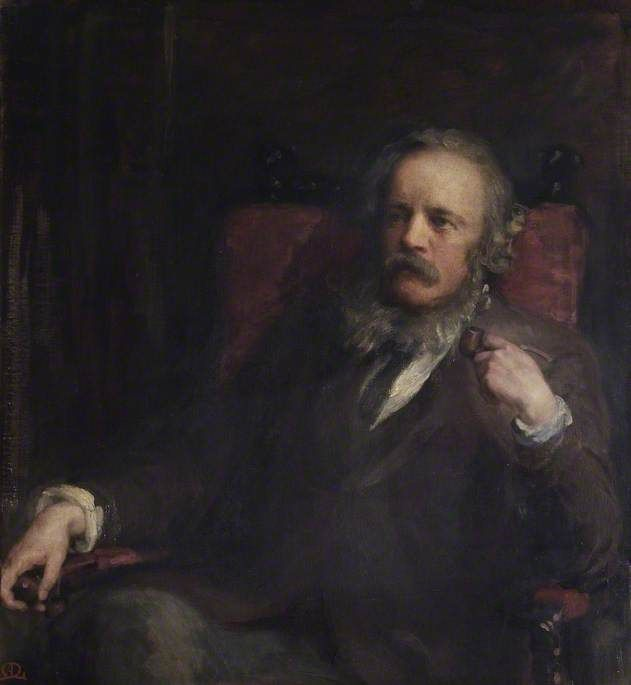
Portrait of the artist's husband Henry with pipe (1877) by Anna Lea Merritt

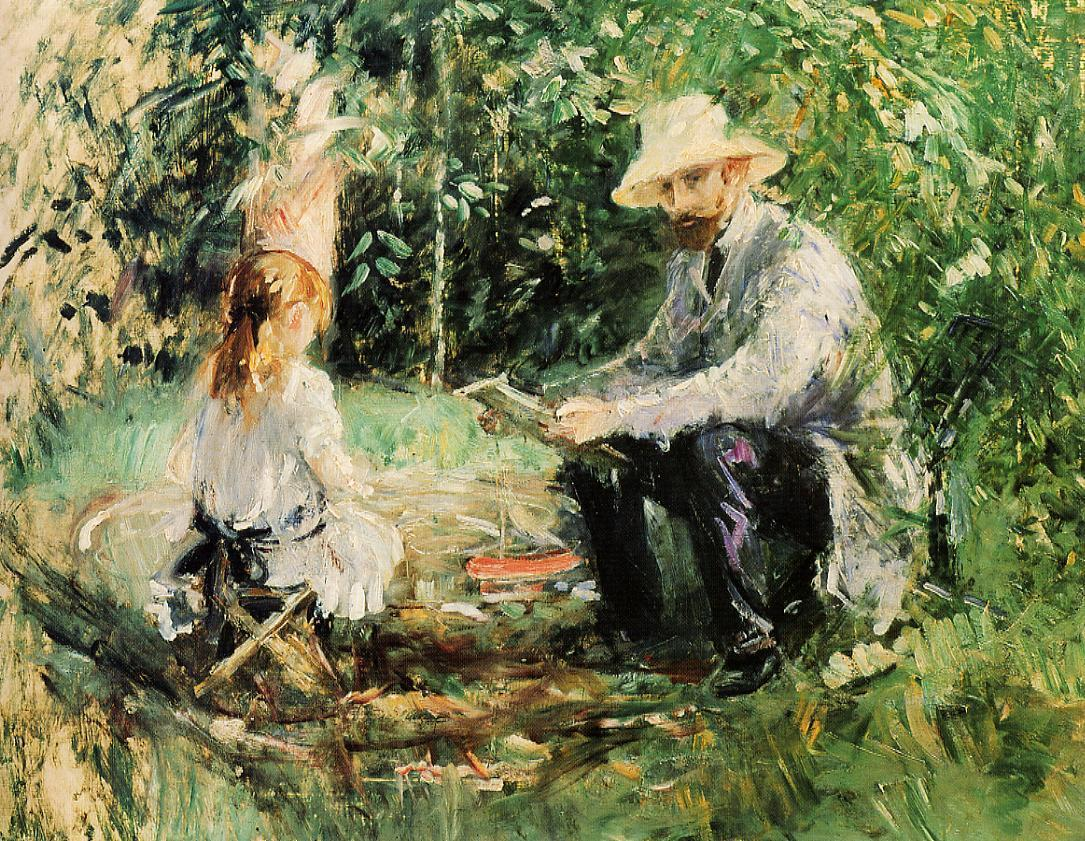
Artist's husband Eugene Manet and Their Daughter in the Garden (1883) by French painter Berthe Morisot

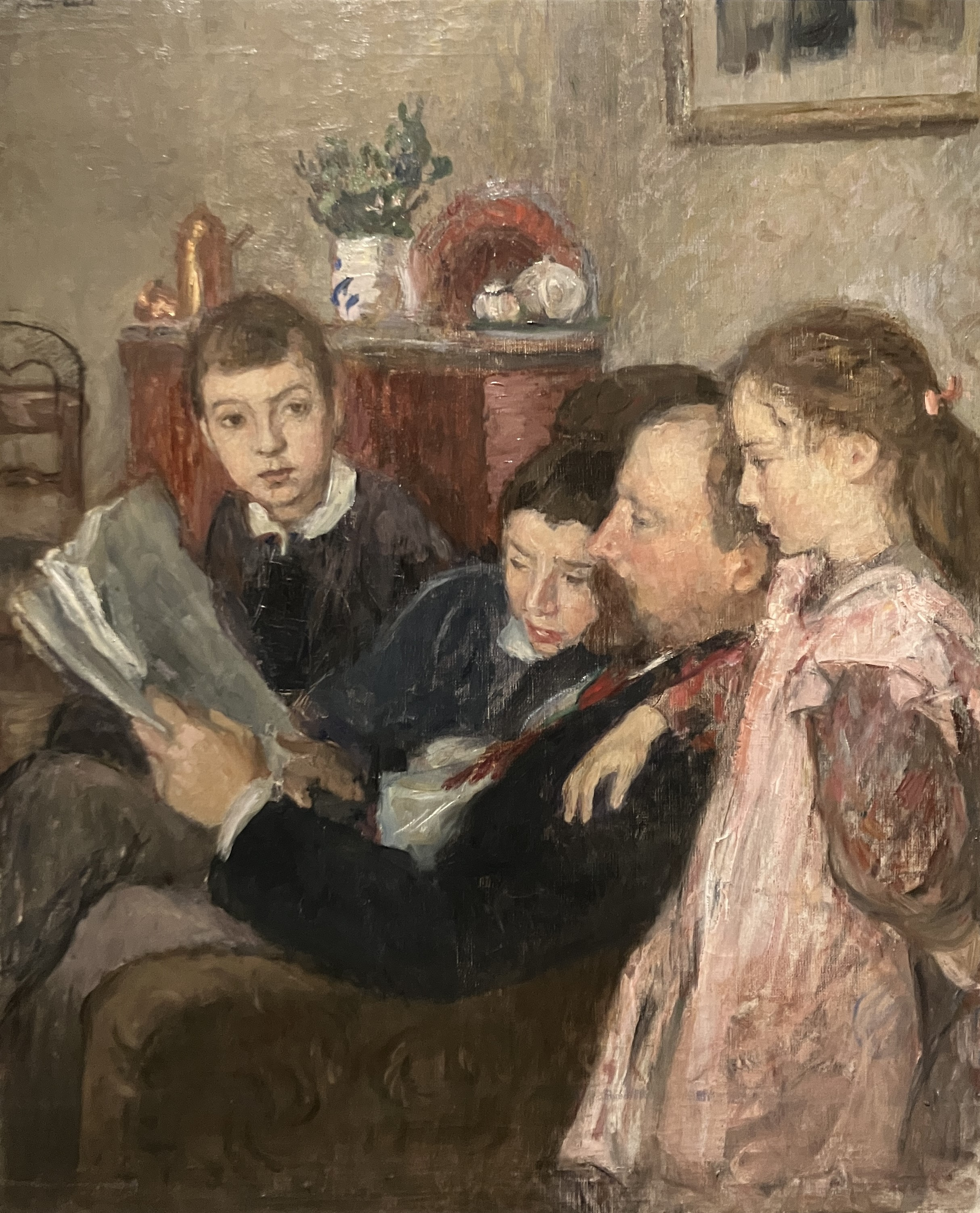
Domestic Happiness (Artist's husband Georg Pauli reading for their children) by Hanna Hirsch-Pauli

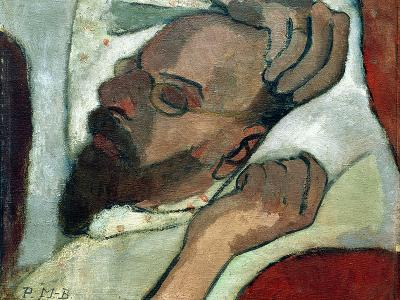
Artist's husband Otto Modersohn Sleeping (1906) by Paula Modersohn-Becker
"Other Family members"
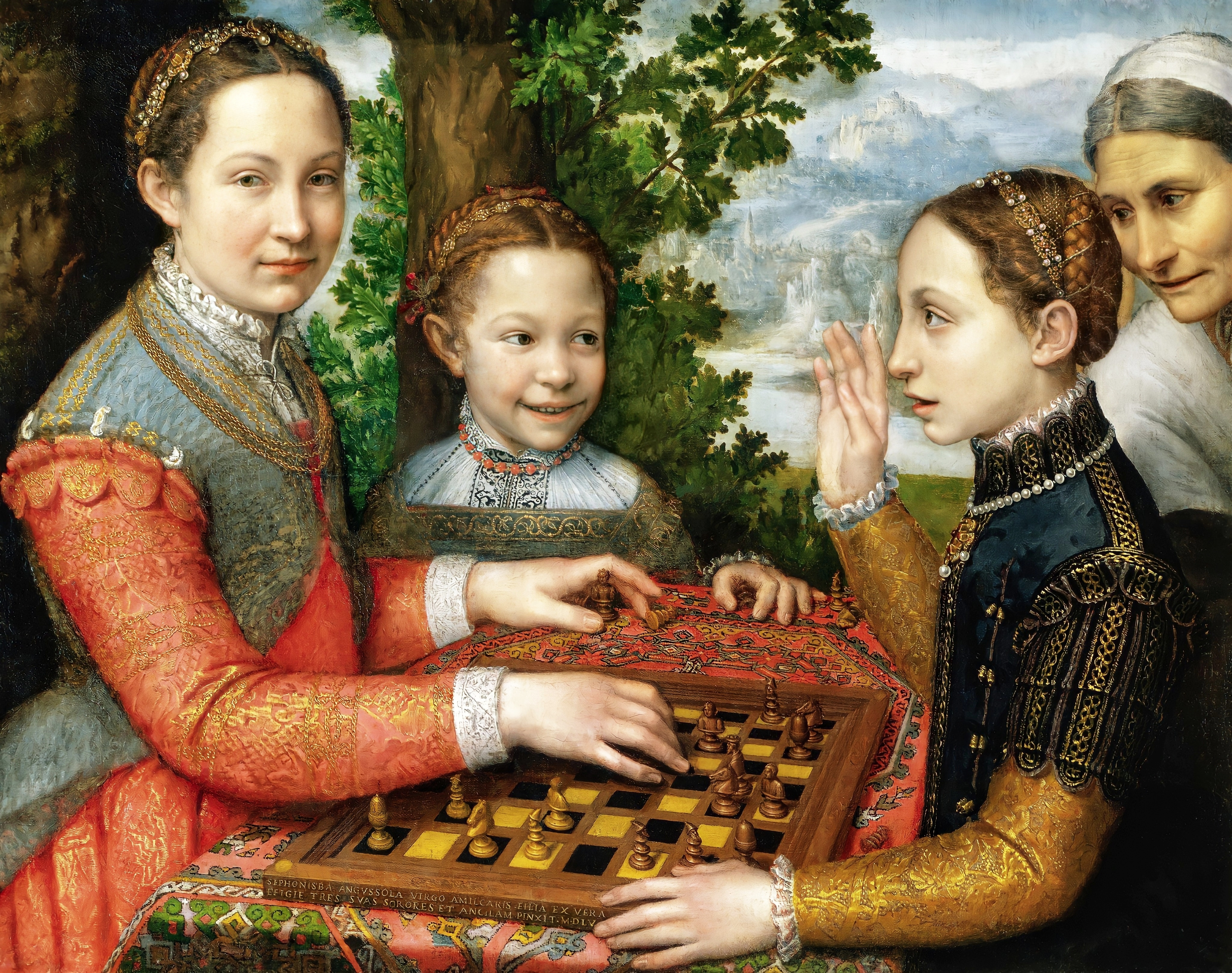
The Game of Chess (1555) by Sofonisba Anguissola (It depicts her sisters Lucia (left), Minerva (right) and Europa (middle) Anguissola playing chess. The older woman is their maidservant.)

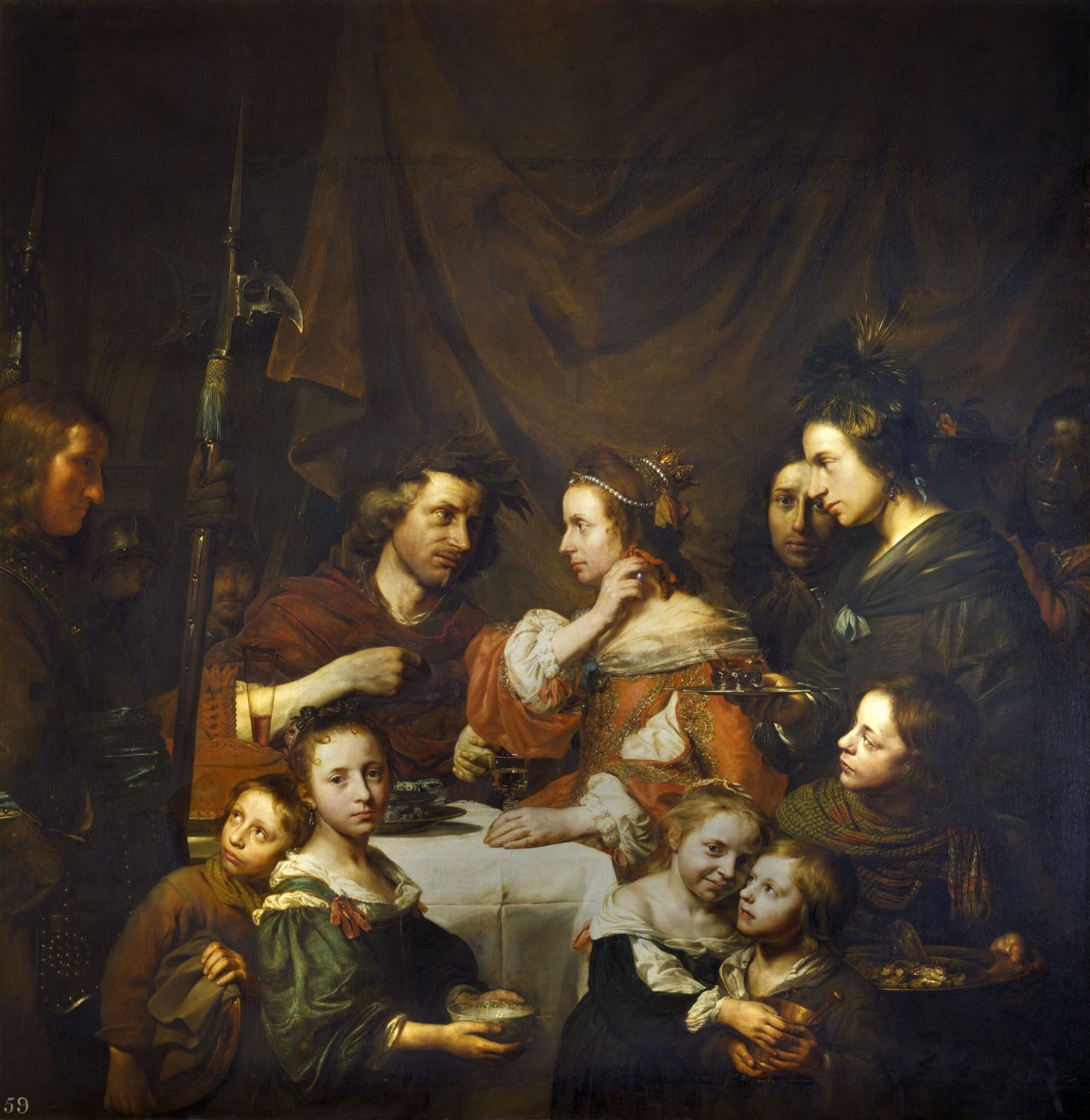
The Banquet of Cleopatra (1652), Royal Collection, by Jan de Bray

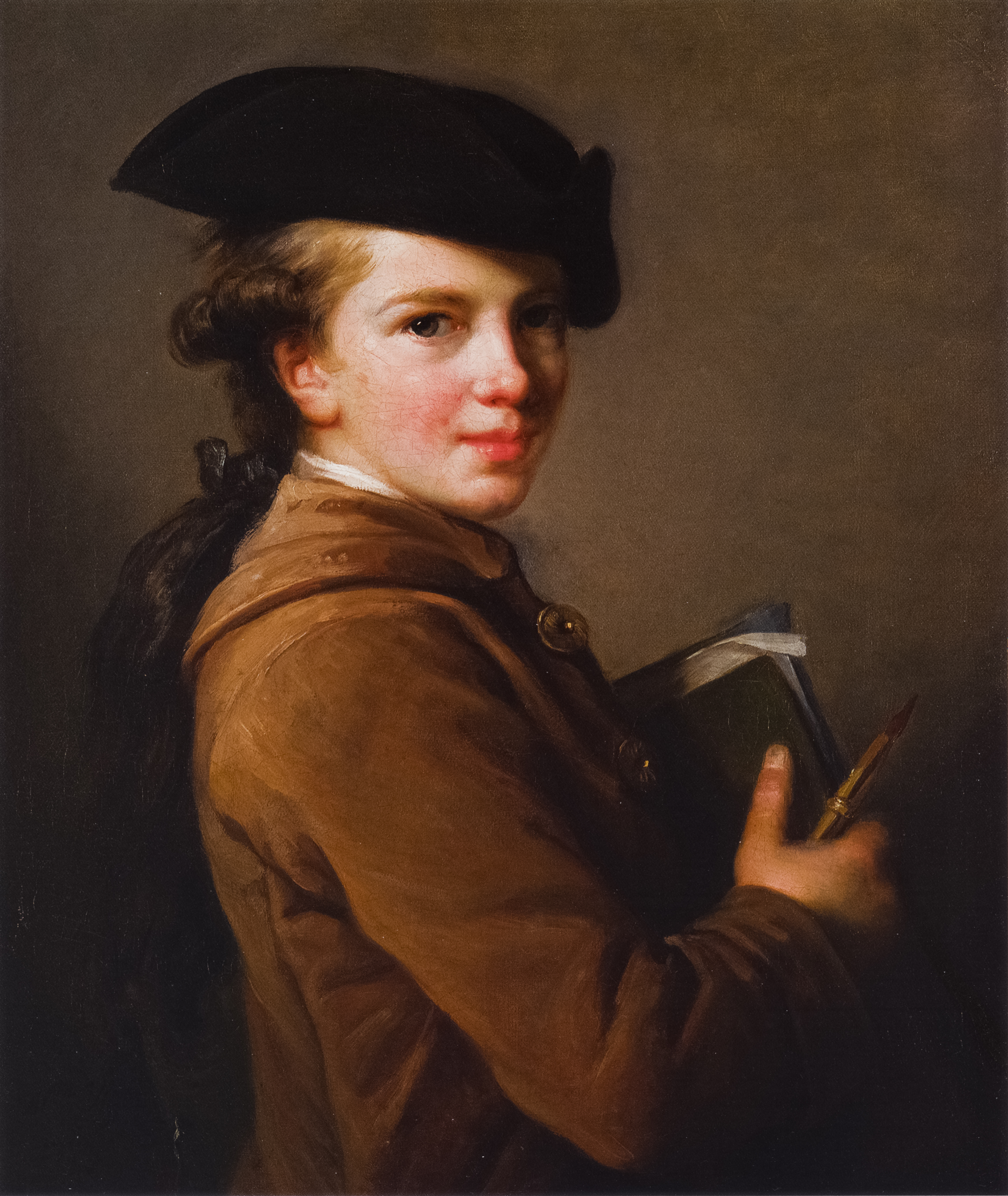
The Artist's Brother Étienne Vigée as schoolboy (1773) by Élisabeth Vigée Le Brun

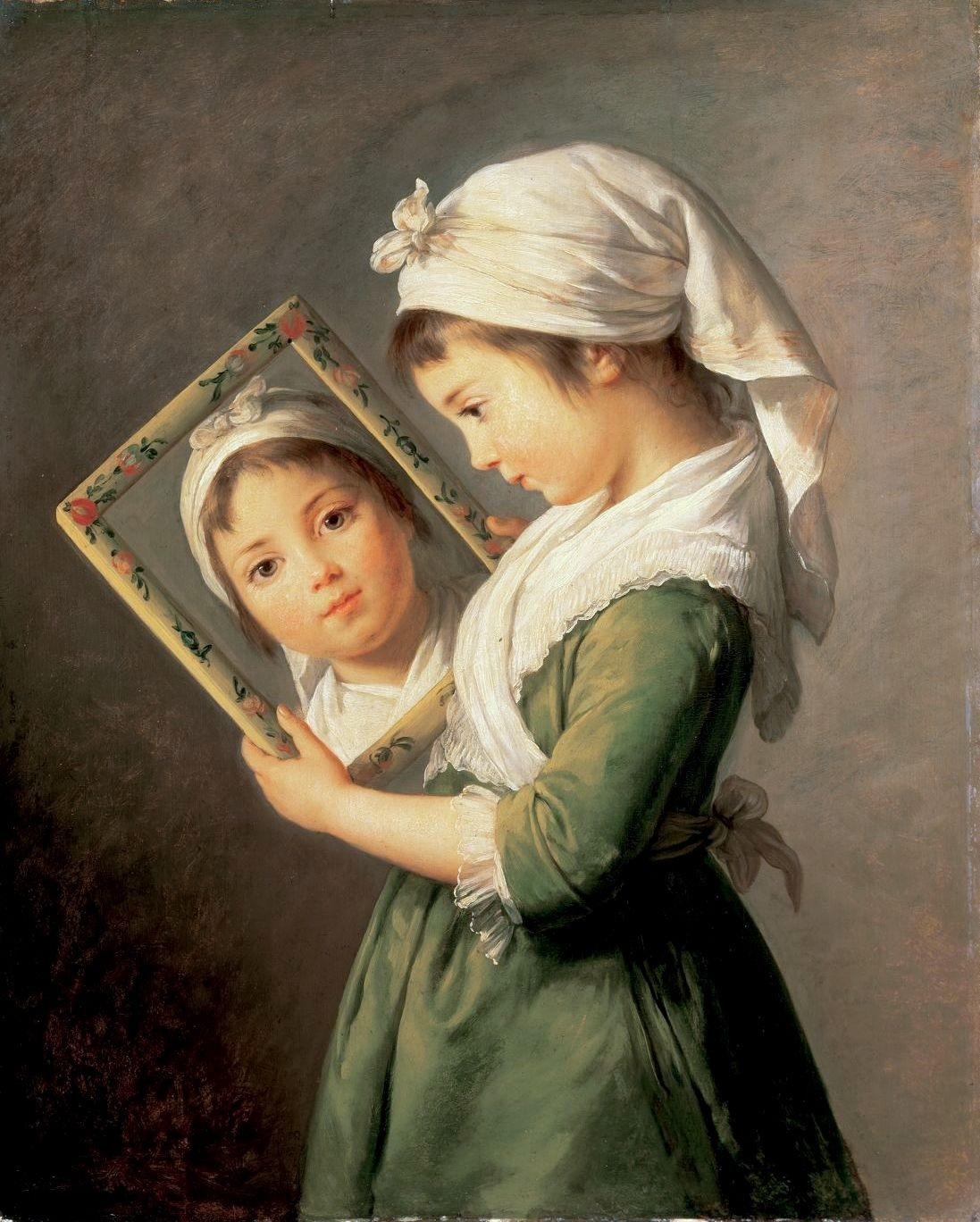
Artist's daughter Julie Le Brun with a mirror (1787) by Élisabeth Vigée Le Brun

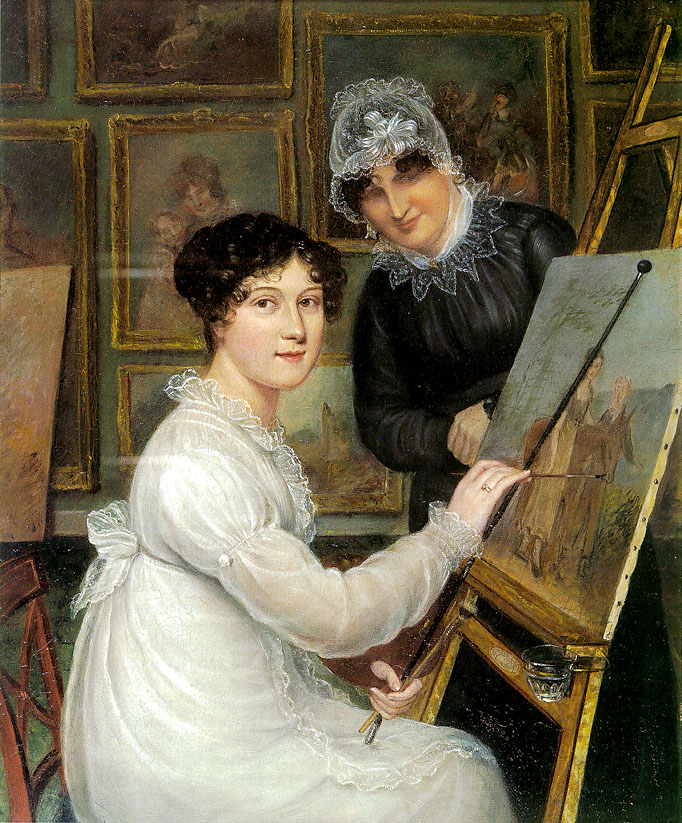
The Artist and her Mother (Ellen Wallace Sharples) (1816) by Rolinda Sharples

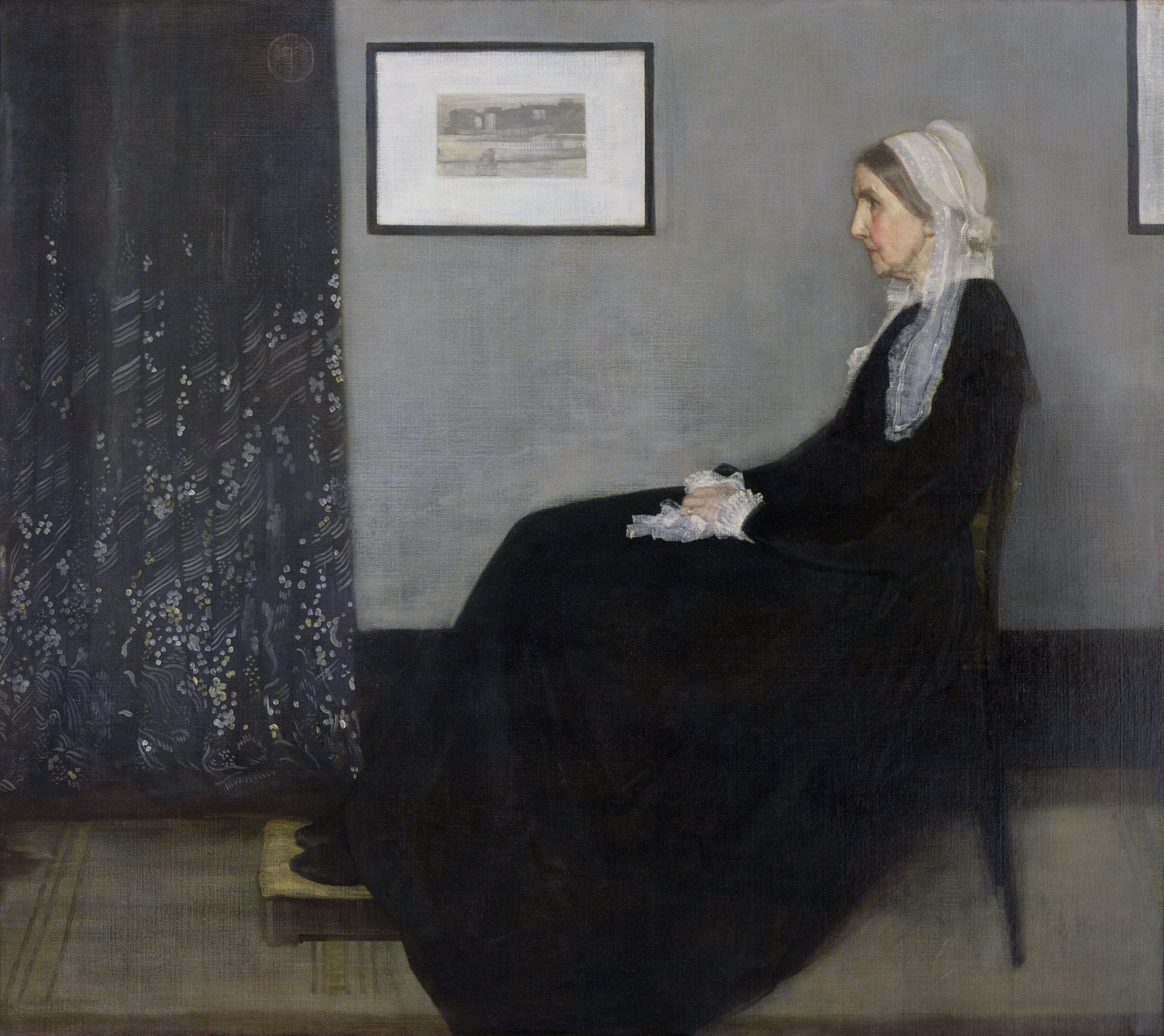
Arrangement in Grey and Black No. 1 (1871), better known as Whistler's Mother, a portrait of Anna McNeill Whistler by her son, James McNeill Whistler

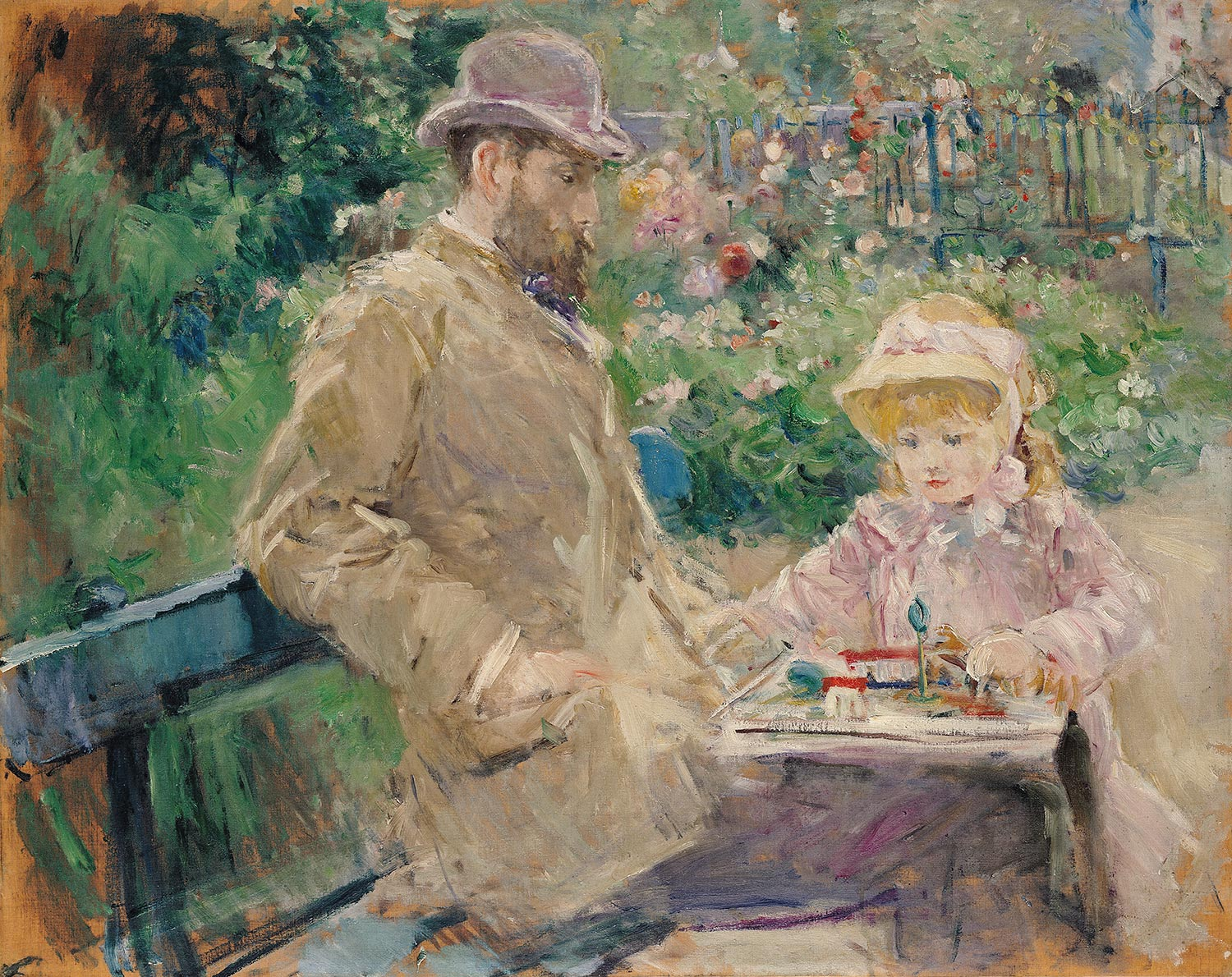
Artist's husband Eugène Manet and their daughter Julie Manet in the Bougival garden (1881) by Berthe Morisot

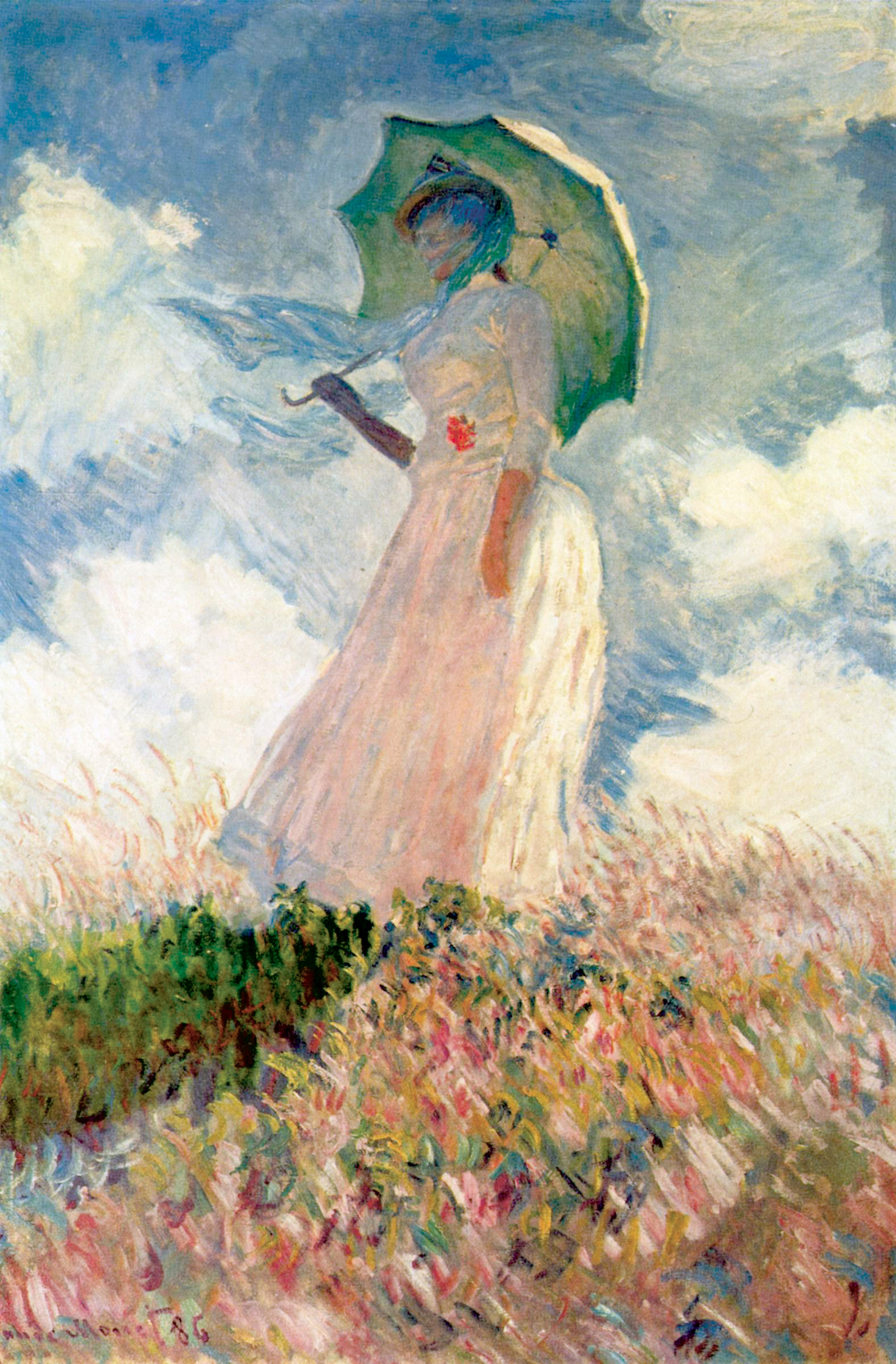
The Woman with a Parasol (Suzanne Hoschedé) (1886) by Claude Monet

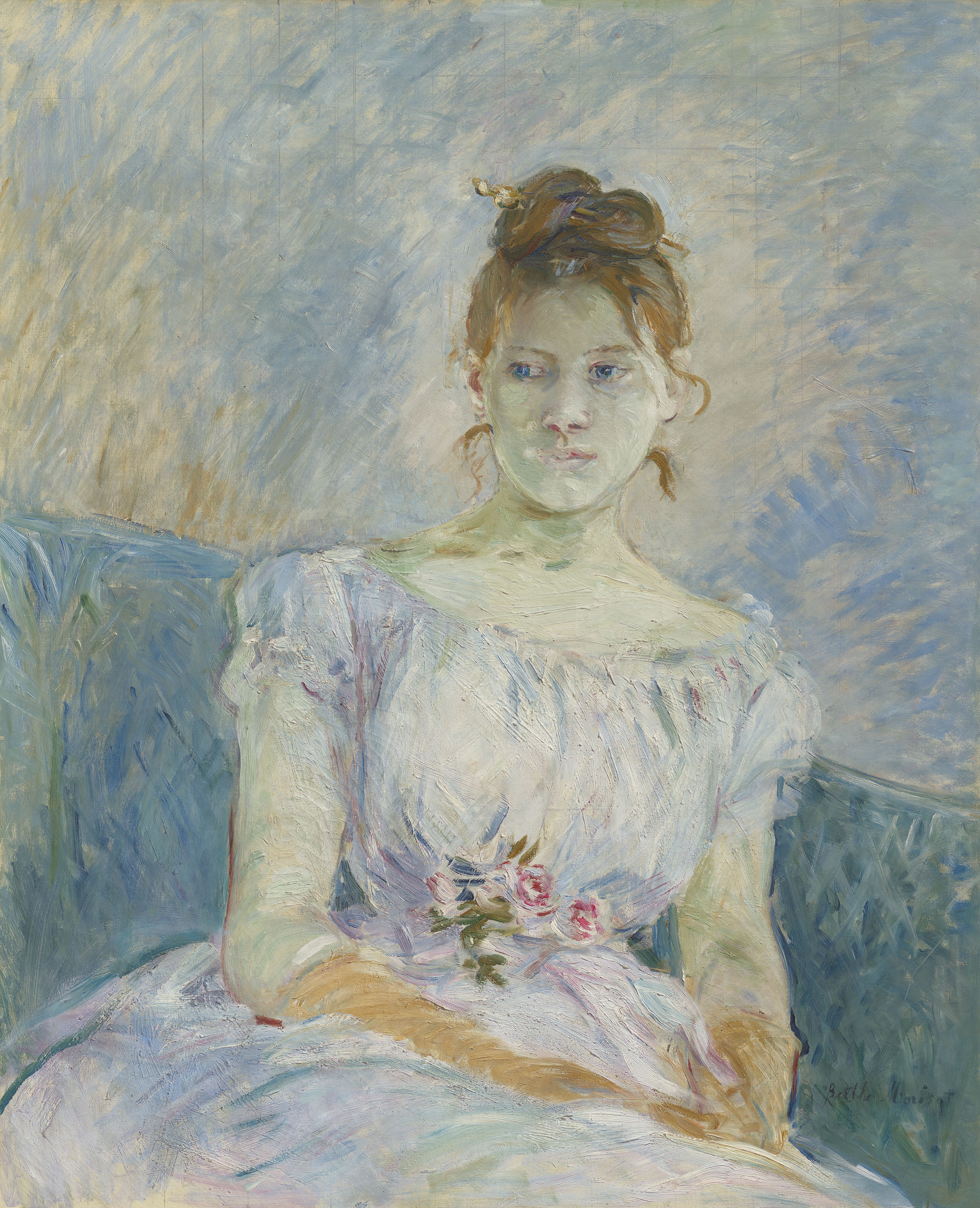
(Artist's niece) Paule Gobillard in ball dress (1887) by Berthe Morisot

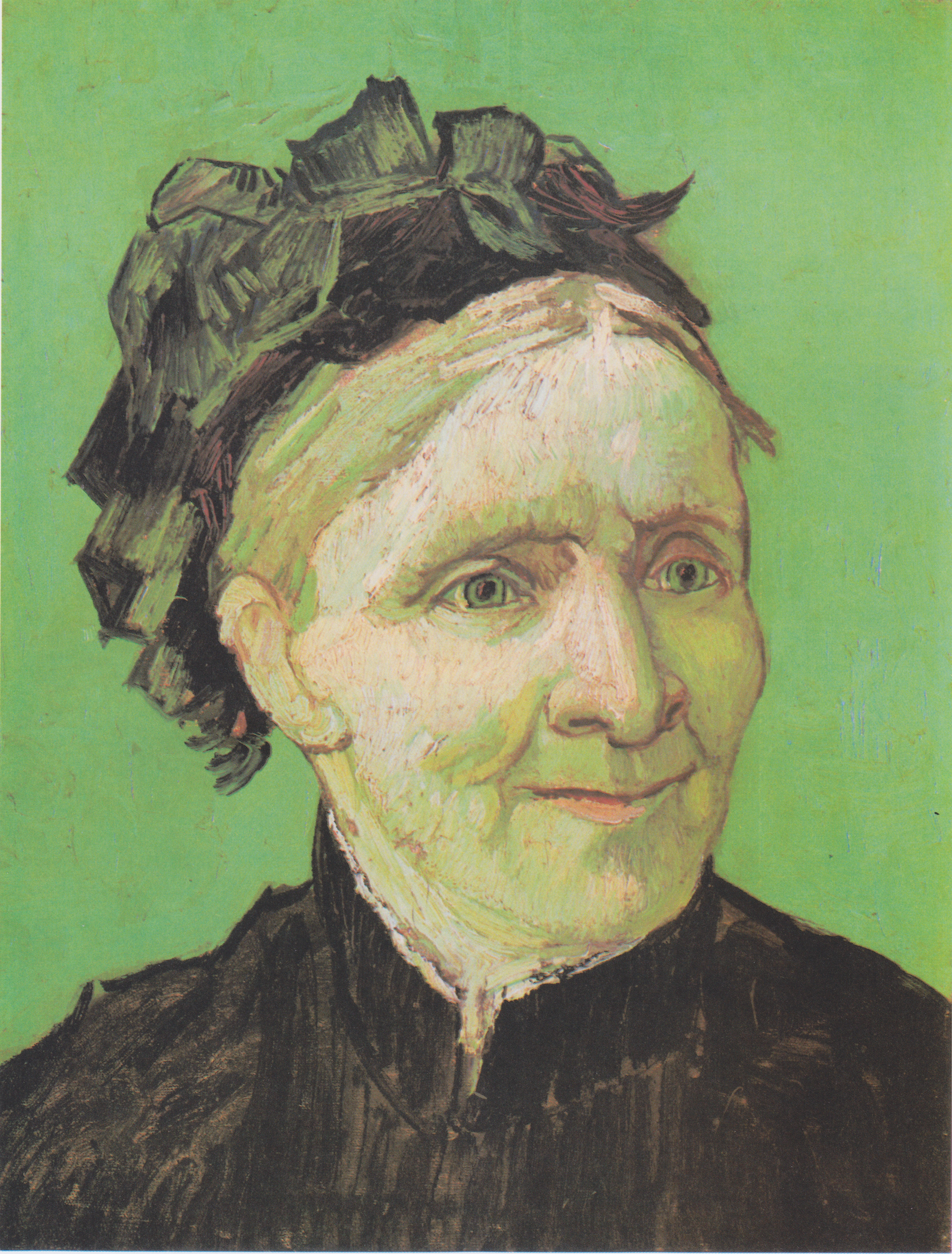
Portrait of the Artist's Mother (October 1888) by Vincent van Gogh

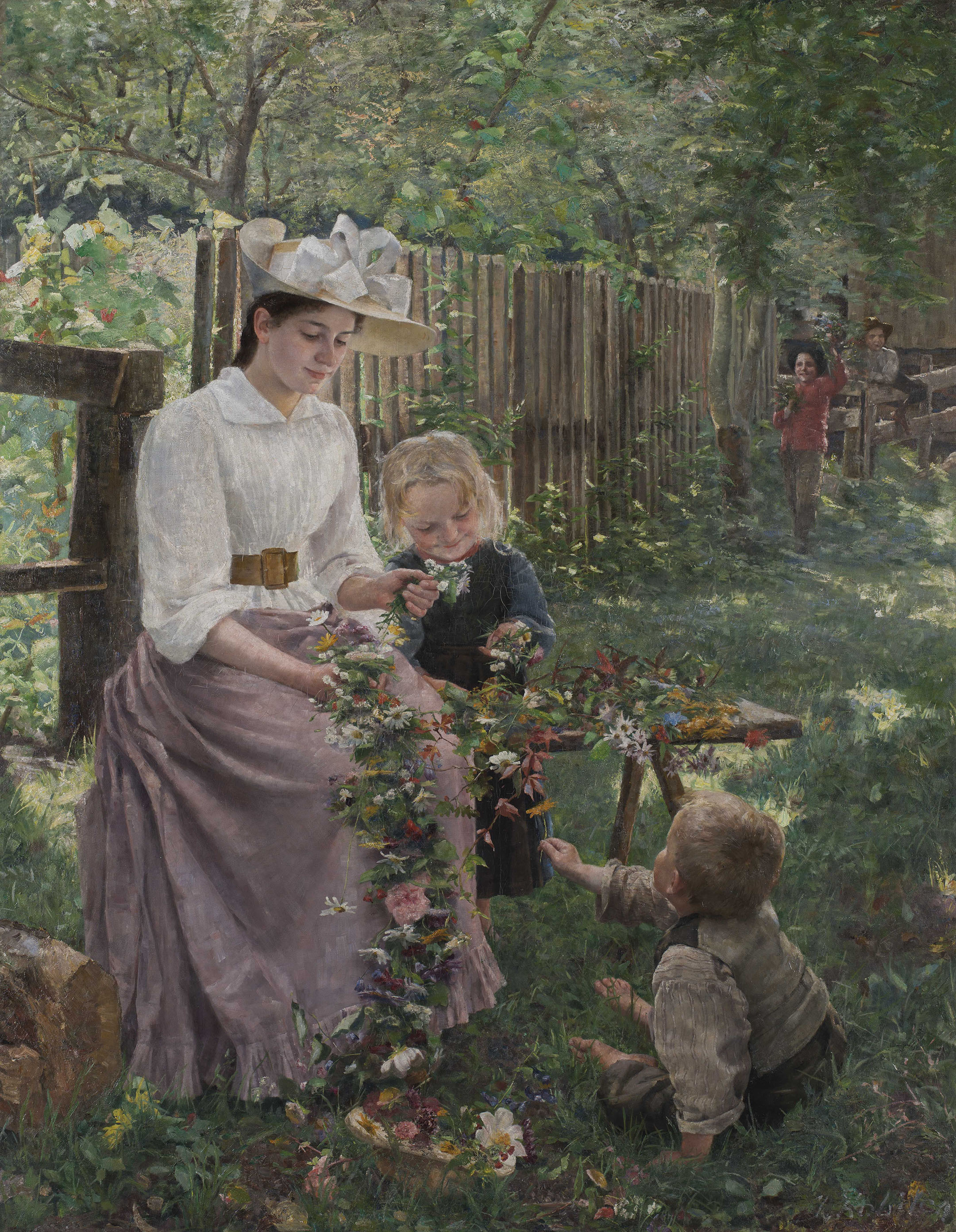
Summer (1890) by Ivana Kobilca (Young woman in the painting is the artist's sister and the children are her cousins.)

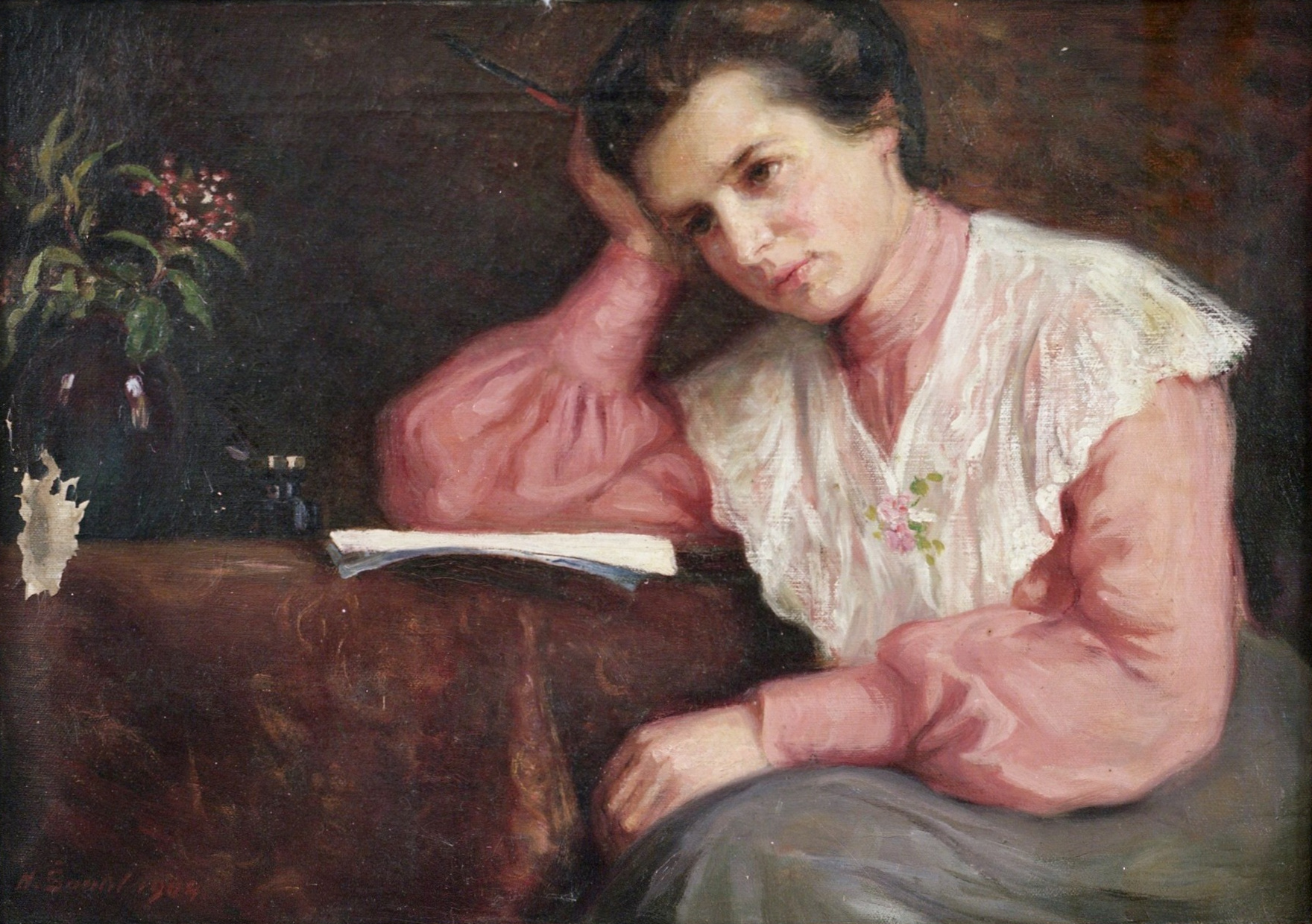
Artist's sister Danica Šantel (1904) by Henrika Šantel

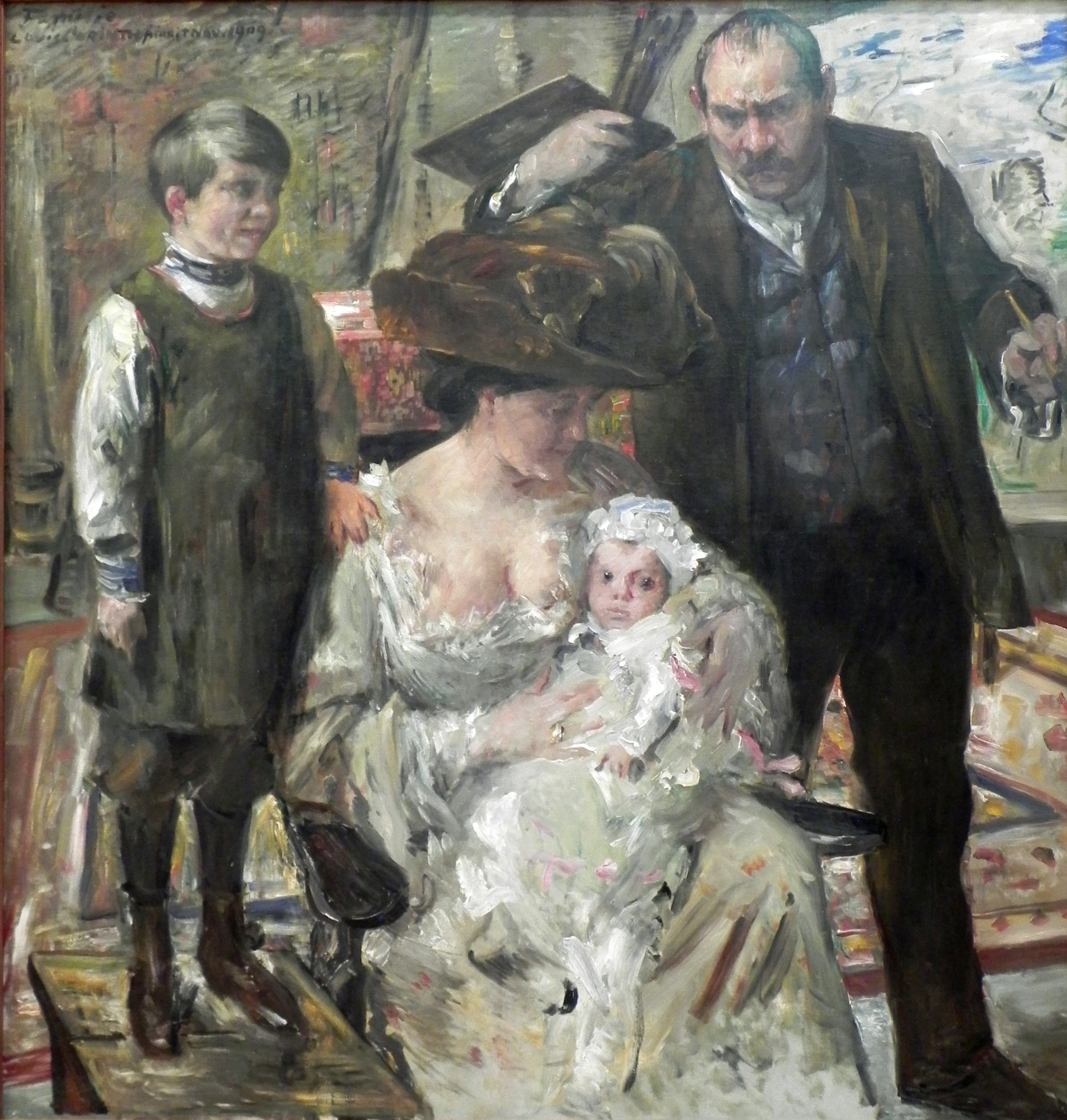
The Artist and His Family (1909) (including his wife Charlotte Berend-Corinth) by Lovis Corinth

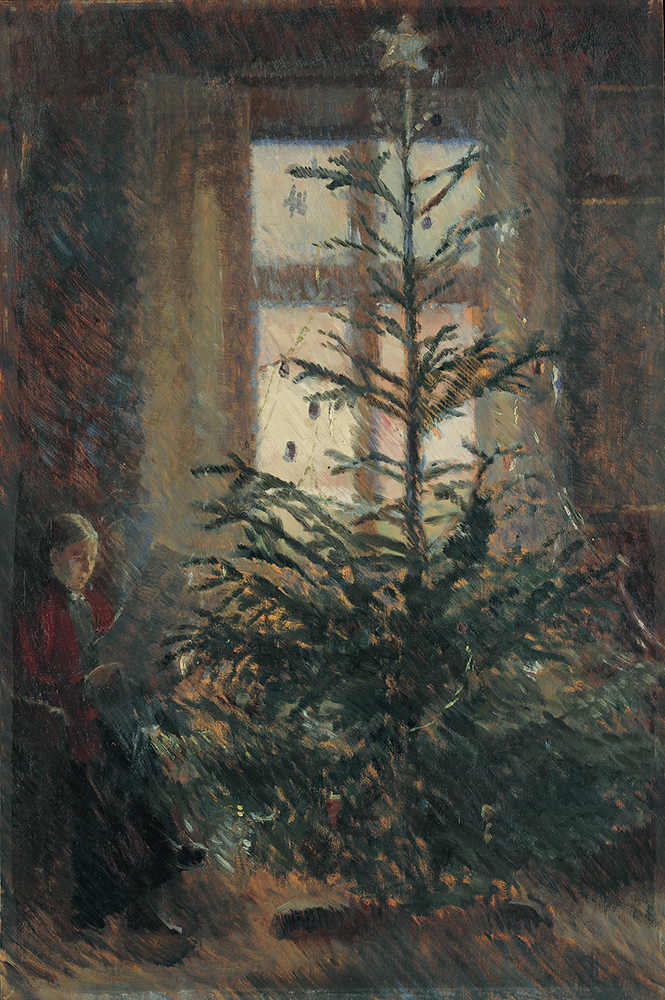
Days of Christmass (1919) by Helga Ancher. The woman in the painting is her mother Anna Brøndum-Ancher

=== Clothed modeling ===
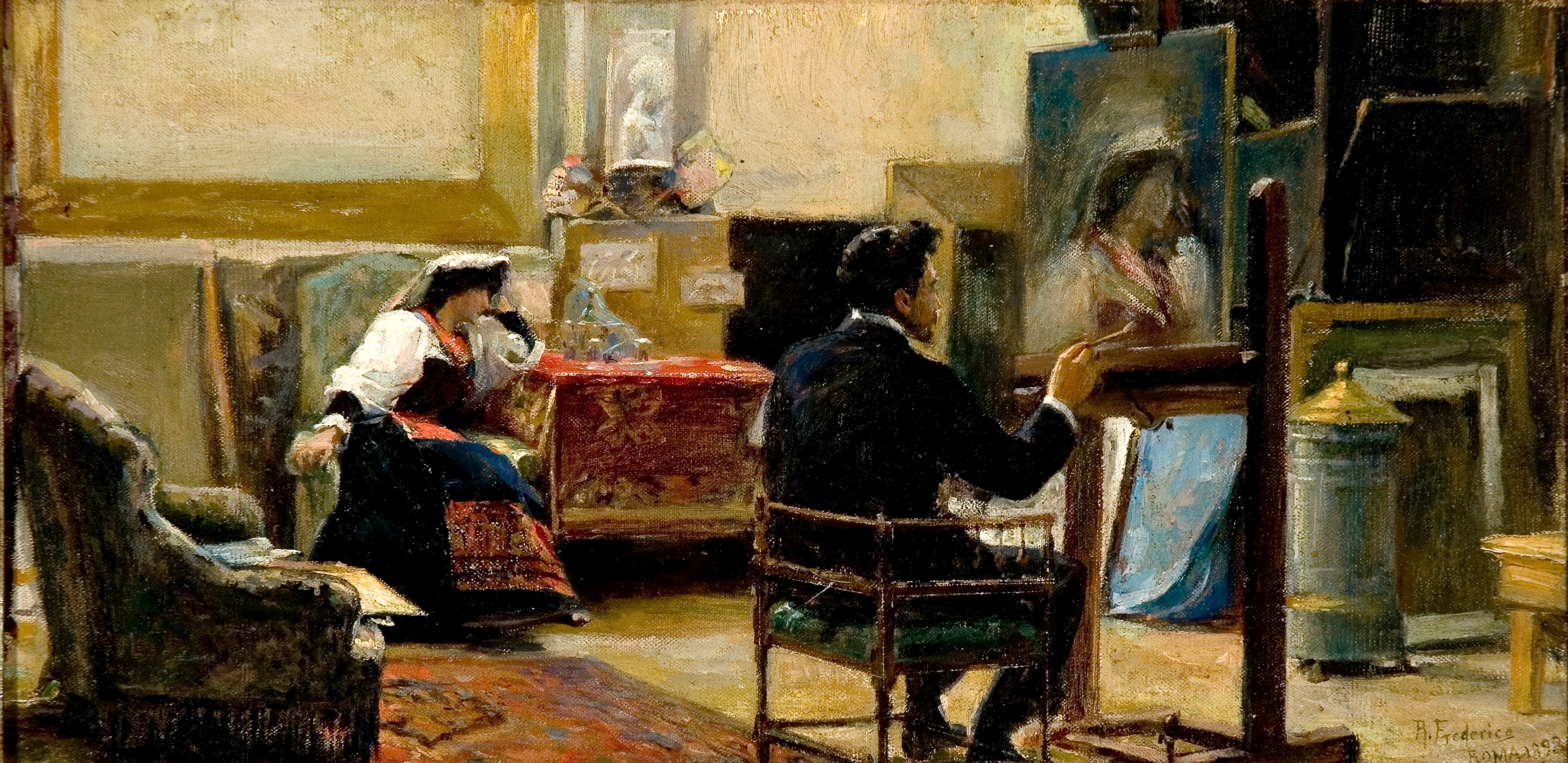
Artist working from a costumed model

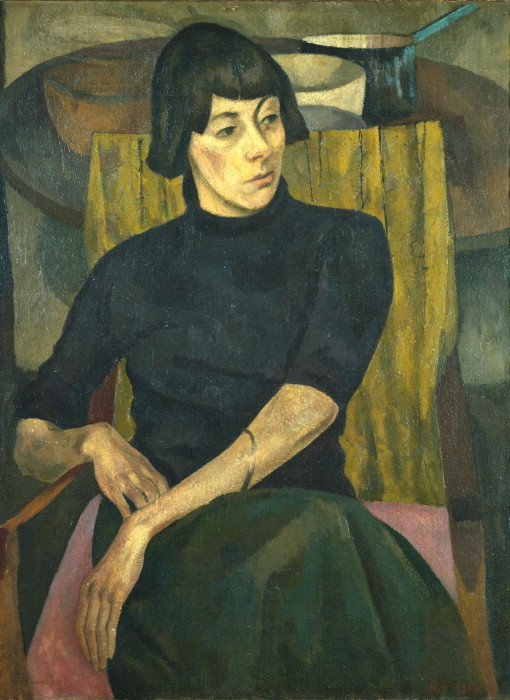
1917 portrait by Roger Fry of Nina Hamnett the "Queen of Bohemia", who also posed nude for Modigliani

Painting classes, and artists doing historical themed works often require clothed or costumed models who take poses that may be sustained until the work is completed. This creates some demand for clothed models in those schools that continue to teach academic painting methods. Some models may promote their services based upon having interesting or varied costumes. Clothing is required in public venues, such as Dr Sketchy's Anti-Art School, but occurs in more traditional settings as well, such as the fund-raising marathons sponsored by the Bay Area Models Guild.

Usually an individual who is having their own portrait painted or sculpted is called a "sitter" rather than a model; when they are not being paid to pose, it is frequently the case that the artist is being paid to create a likeness. Modern portraits are done from photographs at least in part, although artists prefer to have at least some hours of live sitting at the beginning to better capture the personality, and at the end for final touches. In some cases, the sitter may reject a portrait as unflattering, and destroy it.

=== Photography ===
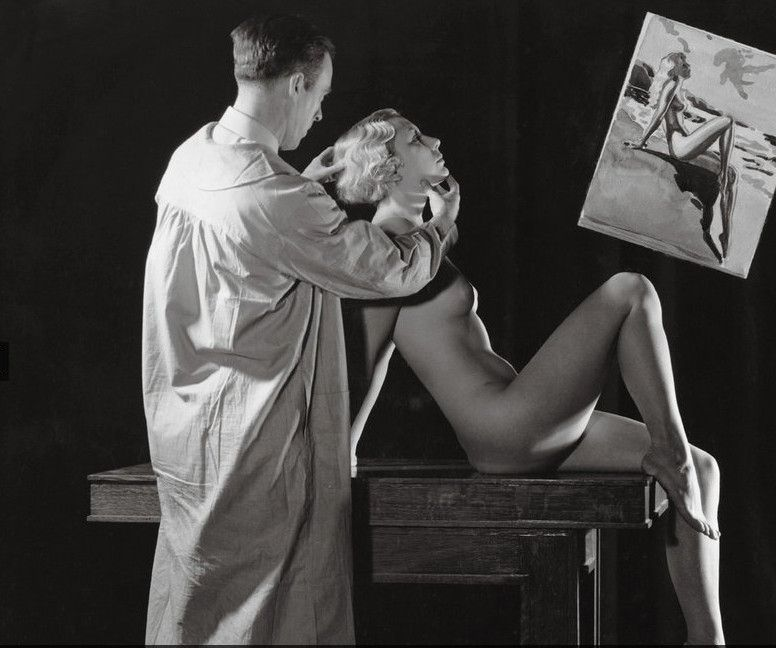
Photographer Earl Moran working with model Zoë Mozert in the 1930s

There has been controversy regarding the status of photography as a fine-arts medium that is reflected in the unwillingness of some models to also pose nude for photography as they would for drawing or painting. The experience of nude modeling for an amateur photographer is different from that of posing for figure drawing/painting. Traditional media create a single image that is not a true likeness of the individual model, but photographs require a release in order to protect the model's right to privacy. The hourly rate of pay for models posing for fine-art photography is much higher than for other media, although less than for commercial photography.

Photographer Sally Mann published the book Immediate Family, in which 13 of the 65 images are of her children nude. Mary Gordon characterized many of these images as sexualizing children regardless of artistic merit. Mann's response to this criticism has been that the images were spontaneous and natural, having no sexual connotations other than those supplied by the viewer. Less well-known photographers have been charged, but not convicted, for suspected child abuse for similar photographs of their own children. Jock Sturges photographed entire families of naturists, which led to an FBI investigation when a photo-lab employee reported the images; however, no charges were made.

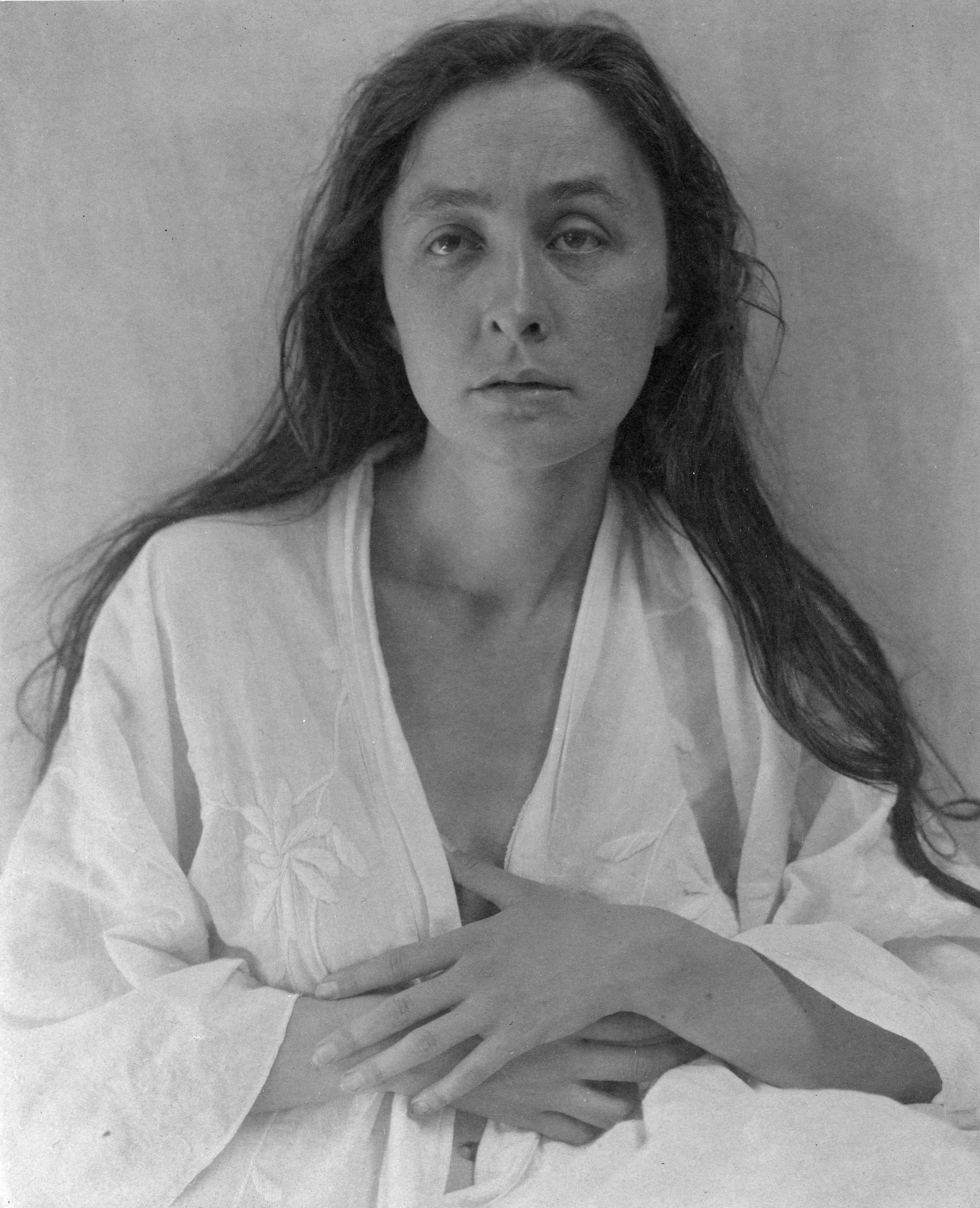
Alfred Stieglitz portrait of Georgia O'Keeffe (1918)

The relationship between male photographers and their wives as models is studied in Arthur Ollman's book, The Model Wife. It focuses on the photographers Baron Adolph de Meyer (whose wife was Olga de Meyer), Alfred Stieglitz (whose wife was Georgia O'Keeffe), Edward Weston and model Charis Wilson, Harry Callahan, Emmet Gowin, Lee Friedlander, Masahisa Fukase, Seiichi Furuya, and Nicholas Nixon.

Occasionally the distinction of participating in Fine Art may make a young amateur model willing to pose for a well-known photographer, examples being Vanessa Williams and Madonna. A signed print of one of the nude photographs of Madonna taken by Lee Friedlander in 1979 sold at auction in 2012 for $37,000. Although largely a result of her fame, the model does not share in this increased value of the artwork.

=== Online ===
During the COVID-19 pandemic, life drawing classes began to appear on online platforms, most frequently on Zoom. This shift to virtual spaces created new, global communities and increased access to artists who were able to join sessions from their homes. Although remote sessions suffer from some difficulties, such as the flattening and distortion of the camera and the lack of direct communications, there has been an expansion of the community willing and able to participate, both as models and artists.

Models at the Government College of Art & Craft in India for whom posing for classes is their only income do not have the online option, but have been supported by donations from artists.

== Nudity and body image ==
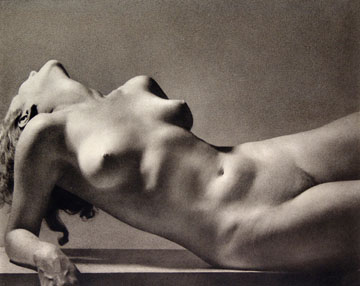
Nude study by William Mortensen

In recent years, a connection has been made between social issues of body image, sexualization and art modeling with some promoting wider participation in life drawing, including at a younger age, to provide an experience of real nude people as an alternative to social media representations of idealized bodies. The social benefits of life drawing were suggested by David B. Manzella in the 1970s while director of the Rhode Island School of Design. Nude models were introduced to the young people's classes with the permission of parents. Models often cite acceptance of their bodies as one of the benefits of modeling. While younger women continue to be the typical model, men and older models are welcomed in cities with an active arts community such as Glasgow, Scotland. Figure On Diversity is one initiative which aims to increase representation in studio art and studio art education by creating resources in support of models who hold visible marginalized identities. Sociologist Sarah R. Phillips, in a 2020 follow-up to her 2005 book Modeling Life notes that models who have contacted her during these years generally experience posing nude in a classroom as empowering. Drawing nude models also had a positive effect upon the artists.

== Alternative views ==
The mainstream view of art modeling is based upon a moderate position regarding the value of figure studies and nudity in art. There are also schools or studios that may be more conservative, or more liberal. Many art programs in Christian institutions consider nudity in any form to be in conflict with their beliefs, and therefore hire only clothed models for art classes. None of the Protestant Evangelical colleges in the United States were found to include nude models in their arts and graphic design programs, citing it as an immodest practice; yet similar institutions in Australia held life drawing classes.

At Louisiana State University (LSU), there are rare objections to nudity by religious or conservative students, but the faculty assert that drawing the body is necessary training for art in general and to understand the structure underneath clothing. Models at LSU are full-time students who learn about modeling from other students or artists. Brigham Young University does not allow nude models, describing their policy as self-censorship within the context of the school's honor code. Other institutions view the absence of figure studies as bringing into question the completeness of the art education offered. Some recognize that an appreciation of the beauty of the human body is compatible with a Christian education. Gordon College not only maintains the need for nude figure studies as part of a complete classical art education, but sees the use of models clad in swimwear or other revealing garments as placing the activity in the context of advertisement and sexual exploitation.

James Elkins voices an alternative to classical "dispassionate" figure study by stating that the nude is never devoid of erotic meaning, and it is a fiction to pretend otherwise. The advocate of classical aesthetics Kenneth Clark recognized that "biological urges" were never absent even in the most chaste nude, nor should they be unless all life is drained from the work. Most models maintain that posing nude need not be any more sexual than any other coed social situation as long as all participants maintain a mature attitude. However, decorum is not always maintained when either a model or the students are not familiar with the often unspoken rules. Models may be apprehensive about posing for incoming freshmen who, having never encountered classroom nudity, respond immaturely.

Acceptance of the erotic is apparent in the work and behavior of some artists. For example, Picasso was also famous for having a series of model/muse/mistresses through his life: Marie-Thérèse Walter, Fernande Olivier, Dora Maar, and Françoise Gilot. The painter John Currin, whose work is often erotic, combines images from popular culture and references to his wife, Rachel Feinstein.

A feminist view is the male gaze, which asserts that nudes are inherently voyeuristic, with the viewer in the place of the powerful male gazing upon the passive female subject.

== History ==
The role of art models has changed through different eras as the meaning and importance of the human figure in art and society has changed. Nude modeling, nude art and nudity in general have at times been the subject to social disapproval, at least by some elements in society. When the nude in art was most popular, the models that made these artworks possible might be of low status and poorly paid. The stereotype of the female art model was part of bohemianism in the late 19th and early 20th century Europe. The combination of nakedness and the exchange of money led others to associate nude modeling with prostitution, particularly in the United States.

As the 20th century progressed, models gained more recognition and status, including forming the first organizations with some of the functions of labor unions thus becoming a professional occupation. It became possible for individuals to gain notoriety, such as Audrey Munson, who was the model or inspiration for more than 15 statues in New York City in the 1910s. Quentin Crisp began a thirty-year career as a model in 1942.

=== Ancient and Post-classical ===
The Greeks, who had the naked body constantly before them in the exercises of the gymnasium, had far less need of professional models than the moderns; but it is scarcely likely that they could have attained the high level reached by their works without constant study from nature. It was probably in Ancient Greece that models were first used. The story told of Zeuxis by Valerius Maximus, who had five of the most beautiful virgins of the city of Crotone offered him as models for his picture of Helen, proves their occasional use. The remark of Eupompus, quoted by Pliny, who advised Lysippos, "Let nature be your model, not an artist", directing his attention to the crowd instead of to his own work, also suggests a use of models which the many portrait statues of Greek and Roman times show to have been not unknown. The names of some of these models of the era are themselves known, such as the beautiful Phryne who modeled for many paintings and sculptures.

The nude almost disappeared from Western art during the Middle Ages, largely due to the attitude of the early Christians, although in Kenneth Clark's famous distinction "naked" figures were still required for some subjects, especially the Last Judgment. This changed with the Renaissance and the rediscovery of classical antiquity, when painters initially used their male apprentices (garzoni) as models, for figures of both genders, as is often clear from their drawings. Leon Battista Alberti recommends drawing from the nude in his De pictura of 1435; as remained usual until the end of the century, he seems only to mean using male models.

Renaissance life drawing
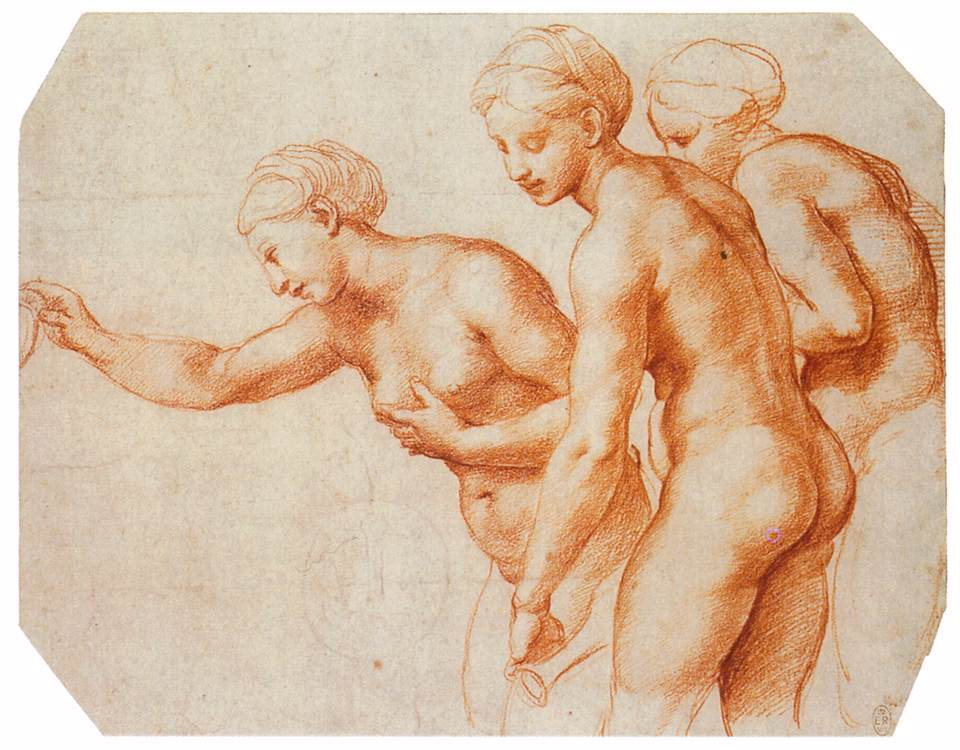
Raphael, red chalk study for the Villa Farnesina Three Graces (c. 1518)

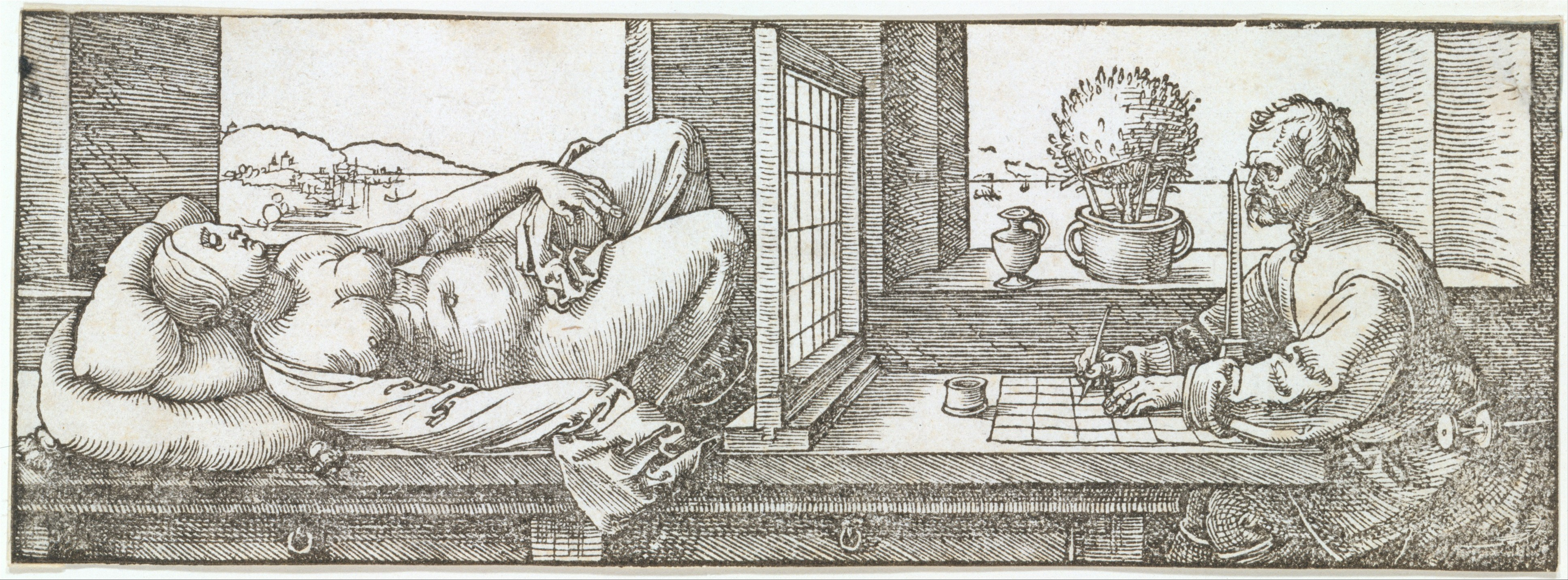
Draughtsman Making a Perspective Drawing of a Reclining Woman, Albrecht Dürer (c. 1600)

=== Early modern ===
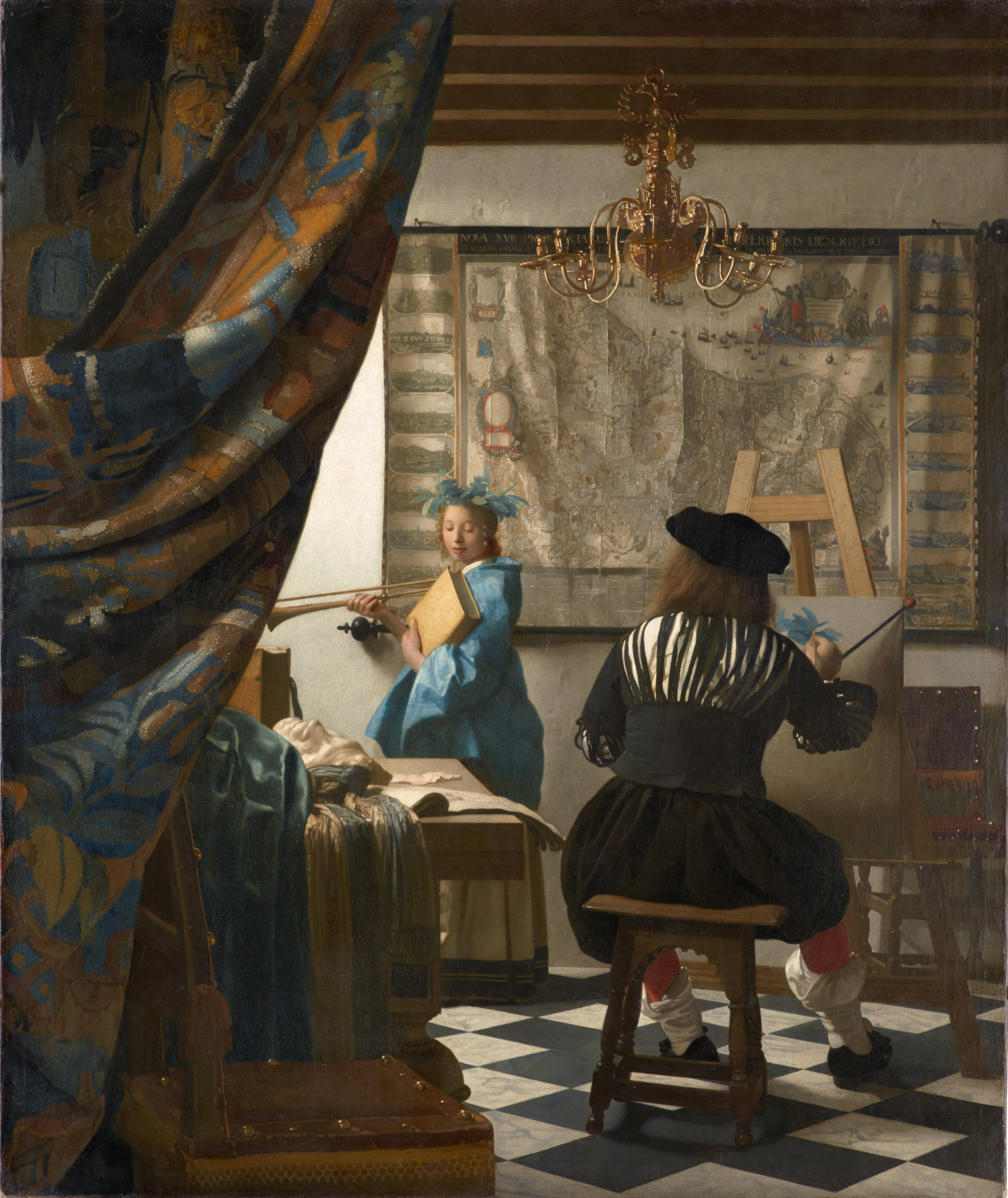
The Art of Painting by Johannes Vermeer, c. 1666

Possibly the first images of nude women done from the life are a number of drawings and prints by Albrecht Dürer from the 1490s, which were ahead of Italian practice. The production of female nudes suddenly became important in Venetian painting in the decade after 1500, with works such as Giorgione's Dresden Venus of c. 1510. Venetian painters made relatively little use of drawings, and it has been thought that these works did not involve much use of live models, but this view has recently been challenged. The first Italian artist to regularly use female models for studies is usually thought to have been Raphael, whose drawings of the female nude clearly do not use teenage boys. Michelangelo's earlier Study of a Kneeling Nude Girl for The Entombment (c. 1500) may or may not have used a female model, but if it did this was not his normal practice.

The story of the love between Raphael and his mistress-model Margarita Luti (La Fornarina) is "the archetypal artist-model relationship of Western tradition". There was also a tradition of incorporating donor portraits as minor figures into religious narrative scenes, and several Virgin and Child compositions by court painters are thought to use princesses or other court figures as models for the Virgin Mary; these are sometimes called "disguised portraits". The most notorious of these is the portrayal as the Virgo lactans (or just post-lactans) of Agnès Sorel (died 1450), the mistress of Charles VII of France, in a panel by Jean Fouquet.

Raphael's relationship was probably somewhat untypical, although the Autobiography of Benvenuto Cellini records his use, in both Rome and Paris, of servant girls as model, mistress and maid. However, when he broke with one he had difficulty in finding another model, and was forced to rehire her just to pose. Lorenzo Lotto records payments to prostitutes to pose in Venice in 1541, perhaps the earliest record of what long remained an option for artists.

Art modeling as an occupation appeared in the late Renaissance when the establishment of schools for the study of the human figure created a regular demand, and since that time the remuneration offered ensured a continual supply. However, academy models were usually only men until the late 19th century, as were the students. The Académie royale de peinture et de sculpture only allowed female models, clothed, from 1759. In London the students at the female branch of the Royal Academy of Art were not allowed to study the undraped figure until the later 19th century.

=== Late modern and contemporary ===
Models in the 19th century
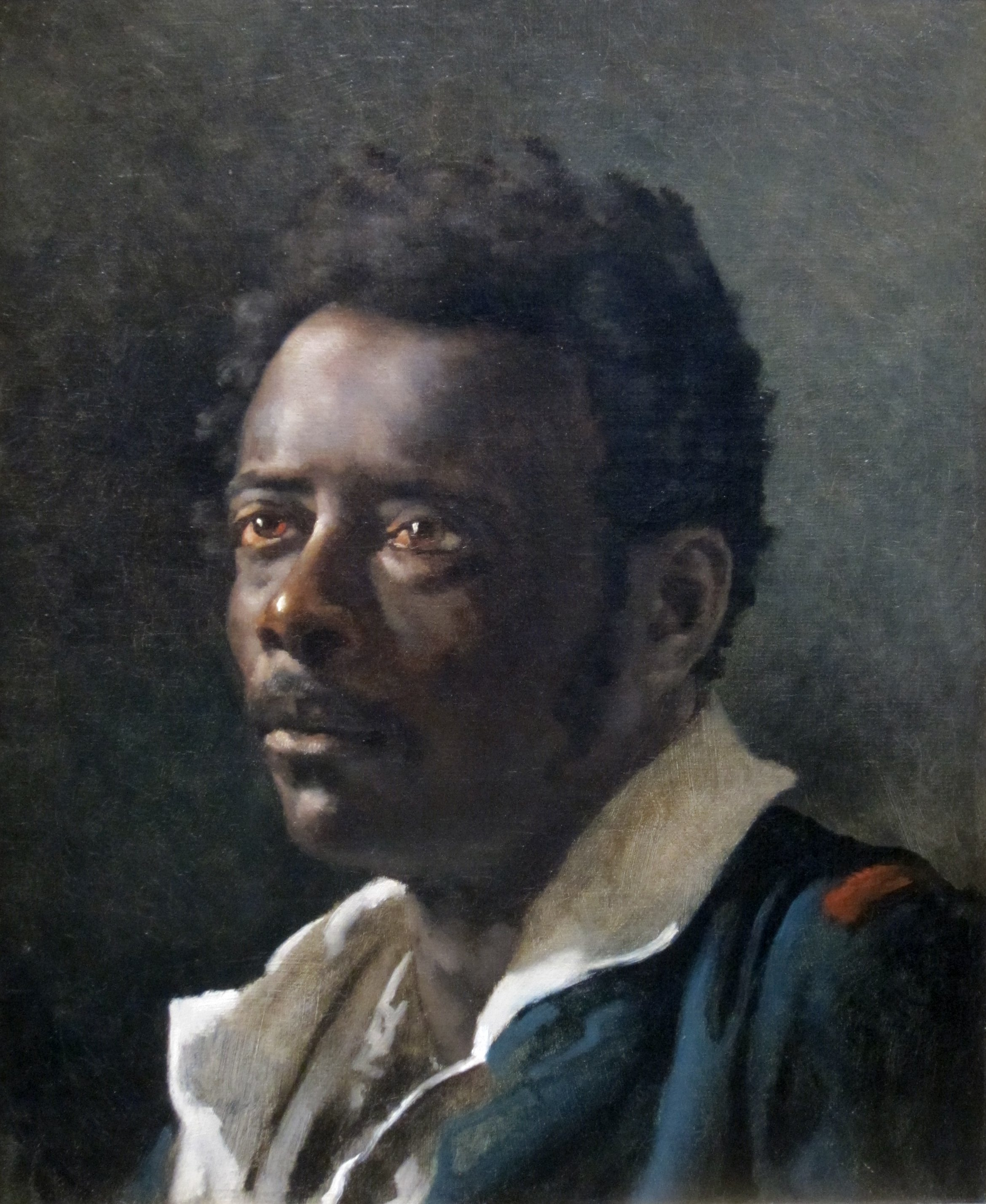
Joseph (c. 1793 – c. 1870), known for The Raft of the Medusa by Théodore Géricault

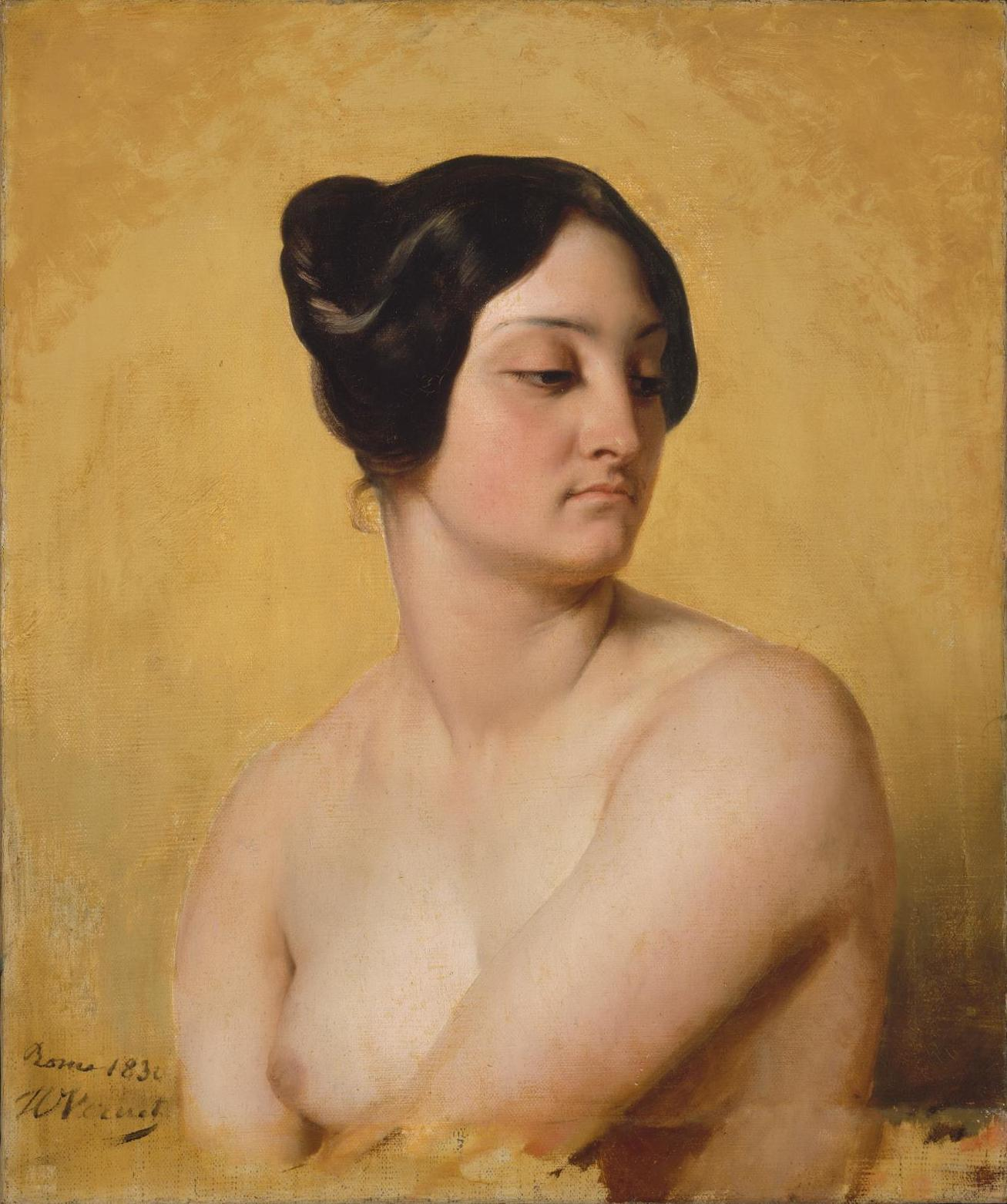
Olympe Pélissier (1799–1878), a French artists' model and the second wife of Gioachino Rossini

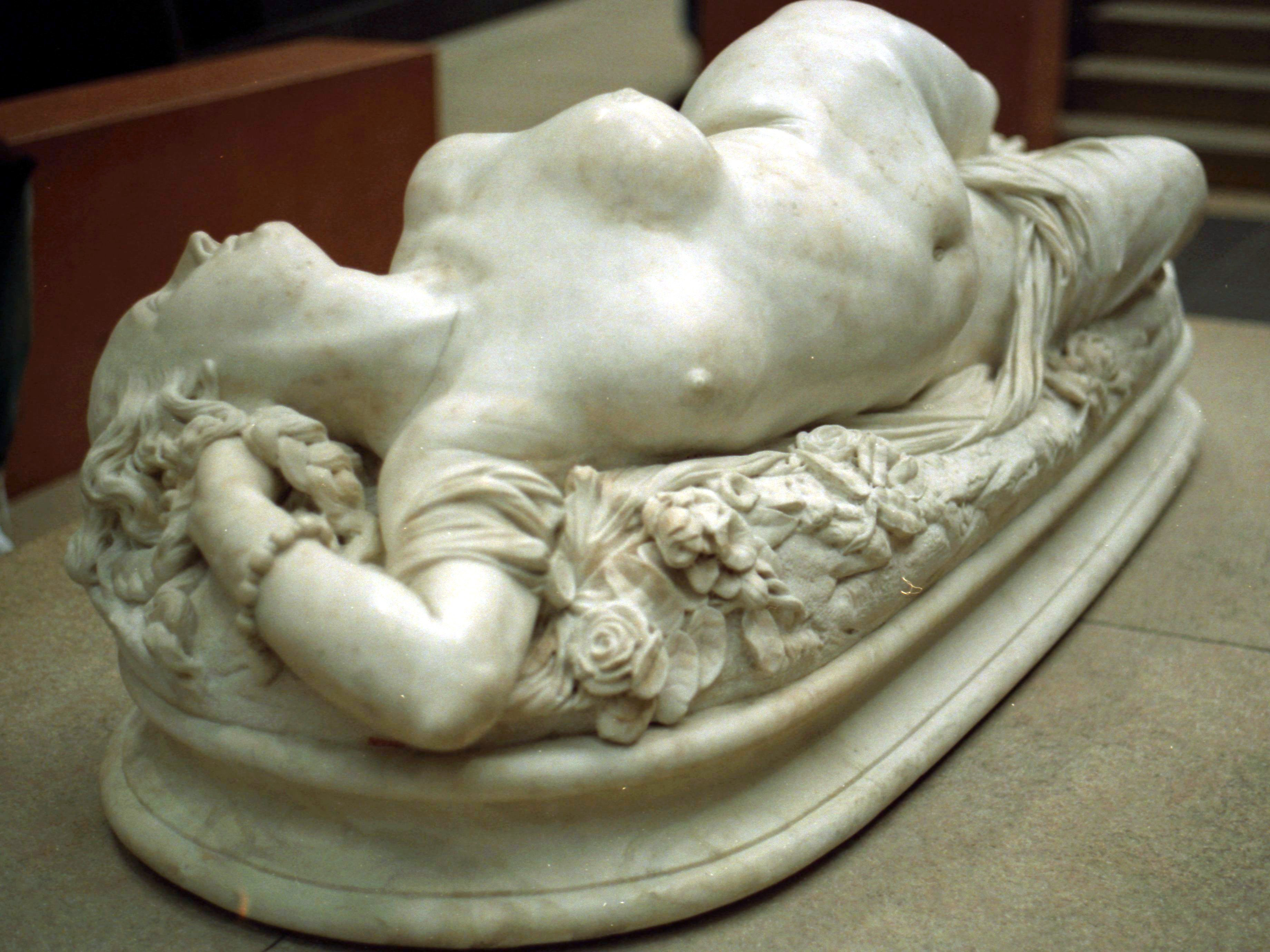
Apollonie Sabatier (1822–1890), a French courtesan, artists' muse and bohémienne in 1850s Paris

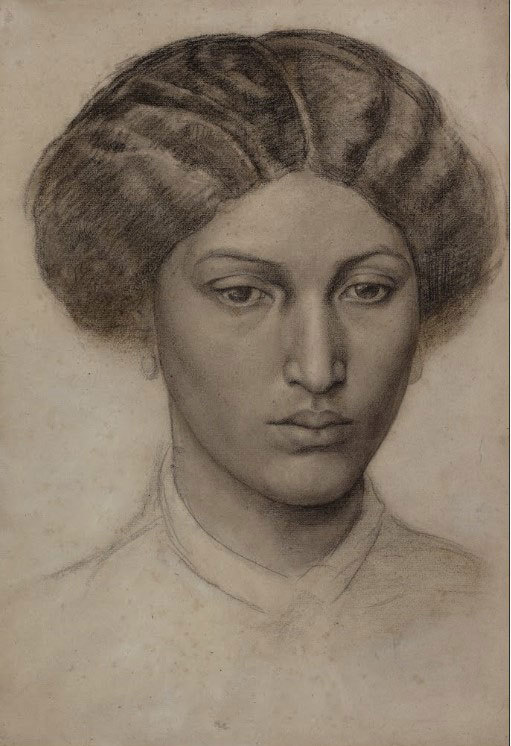
Fanny Eaton (1835–1924), a Jamaican-born British art model known for her work with the Pre-Raphaelite Brotherhood

Joanna Hiffernan (1843–1886) posed for James Abbott McNeill Whistler and Gustave Courbet

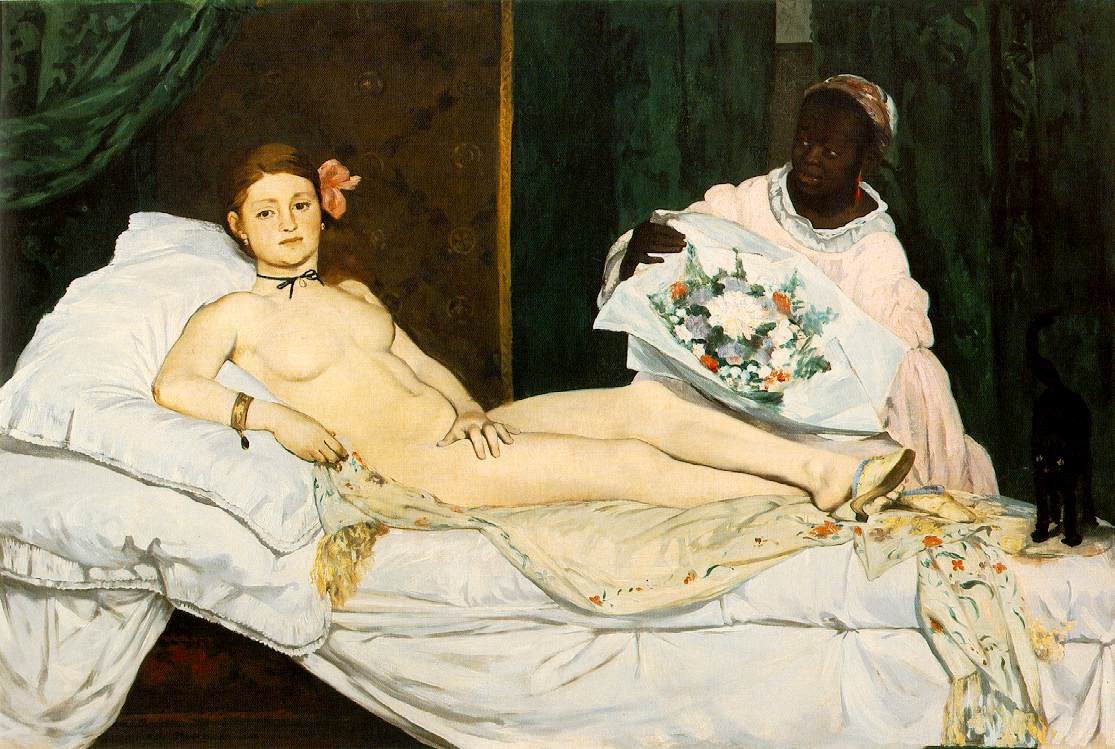
Laure (right) and Victorine Meurent (1844–1927) (left), who regularly worked for Édouard Manet

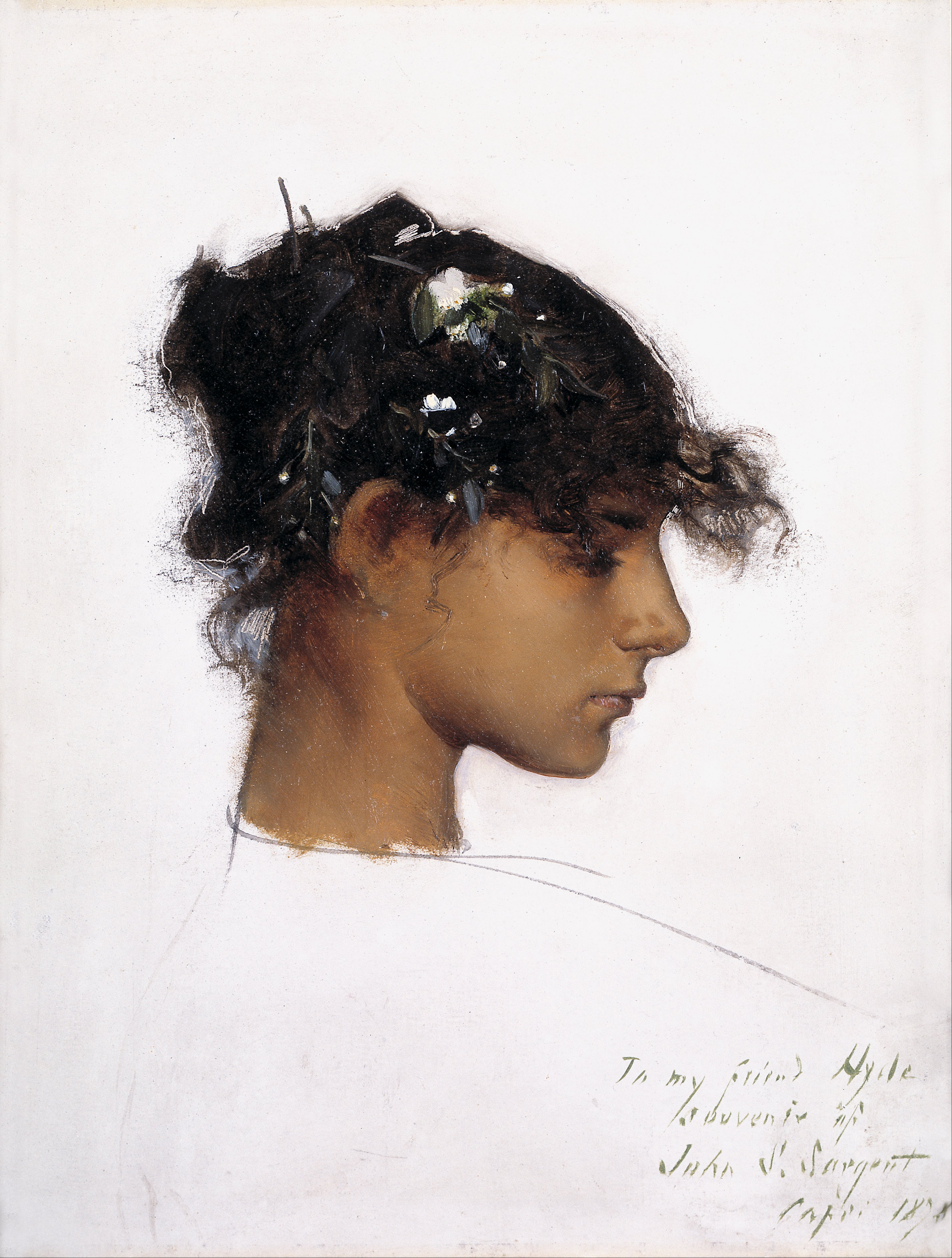
Rosina Ferrara (1861–1934), an Italian girl from Capri, who became the favorite muse of John Singer Sargent

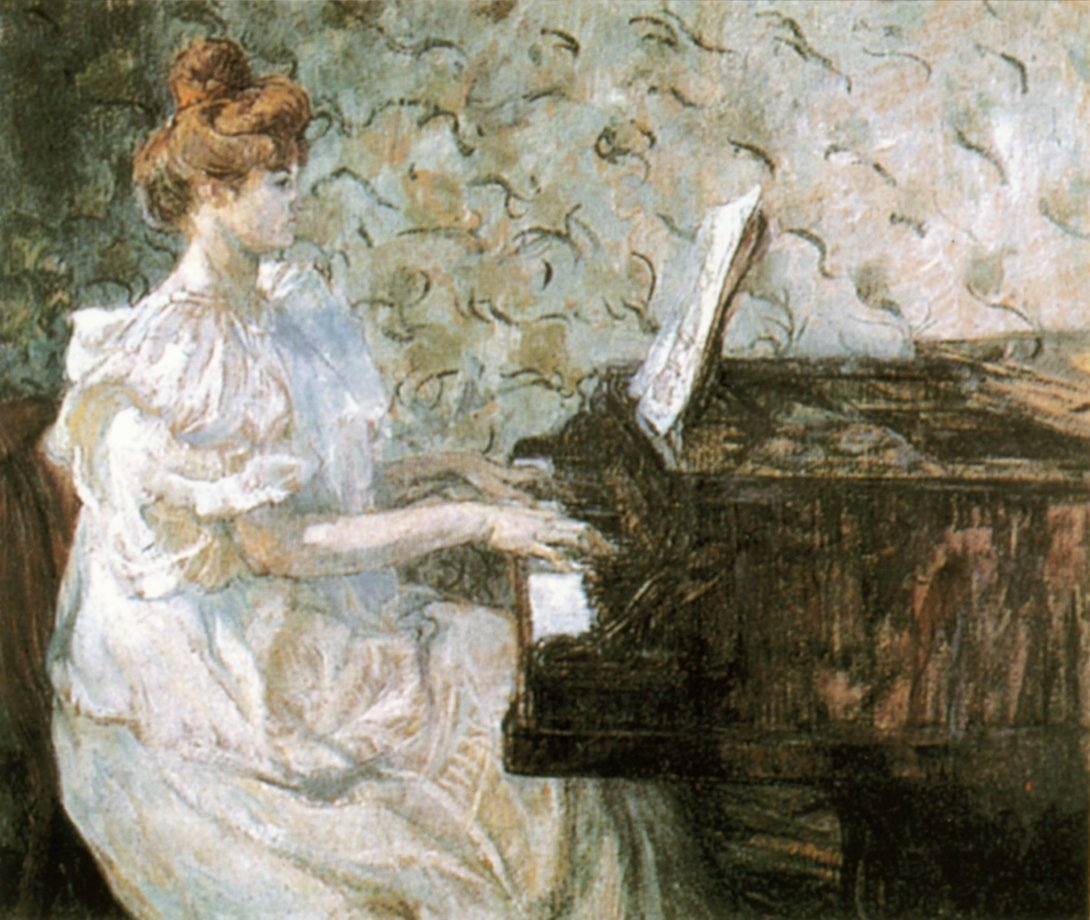
Misia Sert (1872–1950), patron and friend of numerous artists, for whom she posed

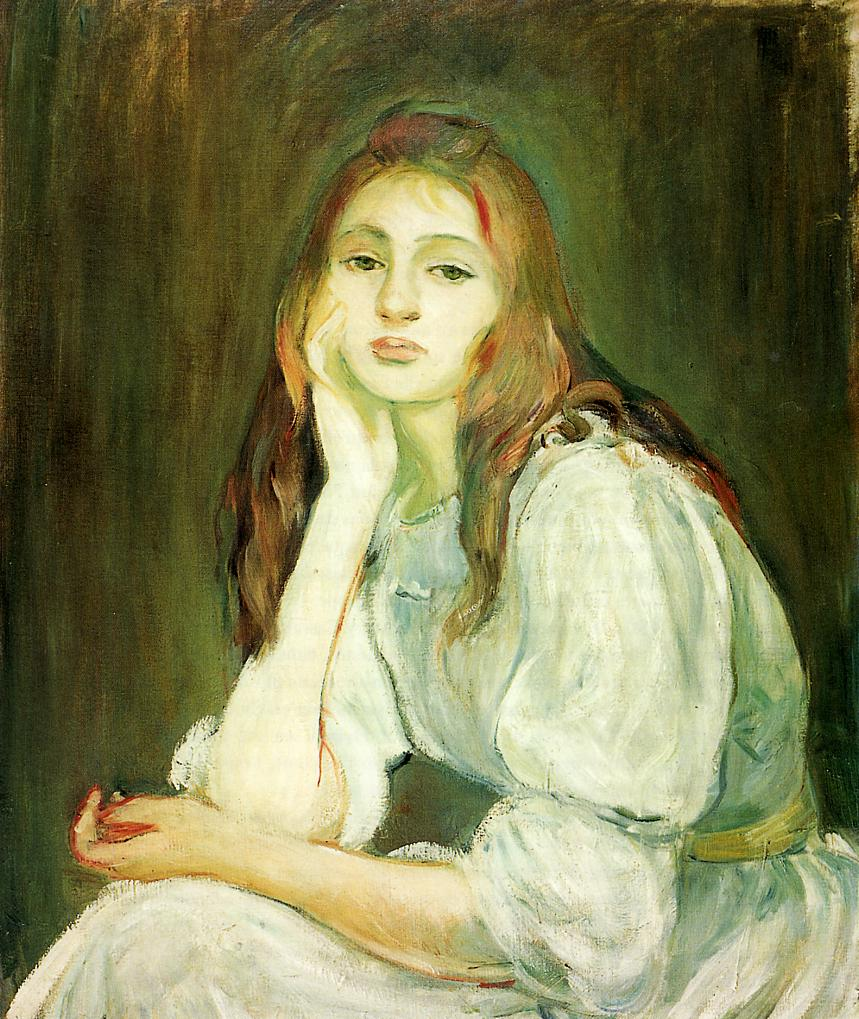
Painter and art collector Julie Manet (1878 –1966) often posed for her mother, painter Berthe Morisot and other Impressionist artists.

In 19th-century Paris, a number of models earned a place in art history. Victorine Meurent became a painter herself after posing for several works, including two of the most infamous: Manet's Olympia and Le déjeuner sur l'herbe. Joanna Hiffernan was an Irish artists' model and muse who was romantically linked with American painter James Abbott McNeill Whistler and French painter Gustave Courbet. She is the model for Whistler's painting Symphony in White, No. 1: The White Girl and is rumored to be the model for Courbet's painting L'Origine du monde. Suzanne Valadon, also a painter, modeled for Pierre-Auguste Renoir (most notably in Dance at Bougival), Henri de Toulouse-Lautrec, Pierre Puvis de Chavannes, and Edgar Degas. She was the mother of the painter Maurice Utrillo. Julie Manet, who posed for her mother Berte Morisot and many other Impressionist artists, was also a painter and an important art collector.

The second Bal des Quat'z'Arts held in 1893 was a costume ball featuring nude models among the crowd, blurring the distinction between the idealized images in works of art and the real people who posed for them. This was symbolic of other social changes that marked the fin de siècle. Four studio models were convicted of public indecency, which was followed by protests of censorship by students of the École des Beaux-Arts.

When Victorian attitudes took hold in England, studies with a live model became more restrictive than they had been in the prior century, limited to advanced classes of students that had already proved their worthiness by copying old master paintings and drawing from plaster casts. This is in part because many schools were publicly funded, so decisions were under the scrutiny of non-artists. Modeling was not respectable, and even less so for women. During the same period, the French art atelier system allowed any art student to work from life in a less formal atmosphere, and also admitted women as students. In England, the life class became well established as a central element in art education only with the approach of the 20th century.

19th-century art school modeling
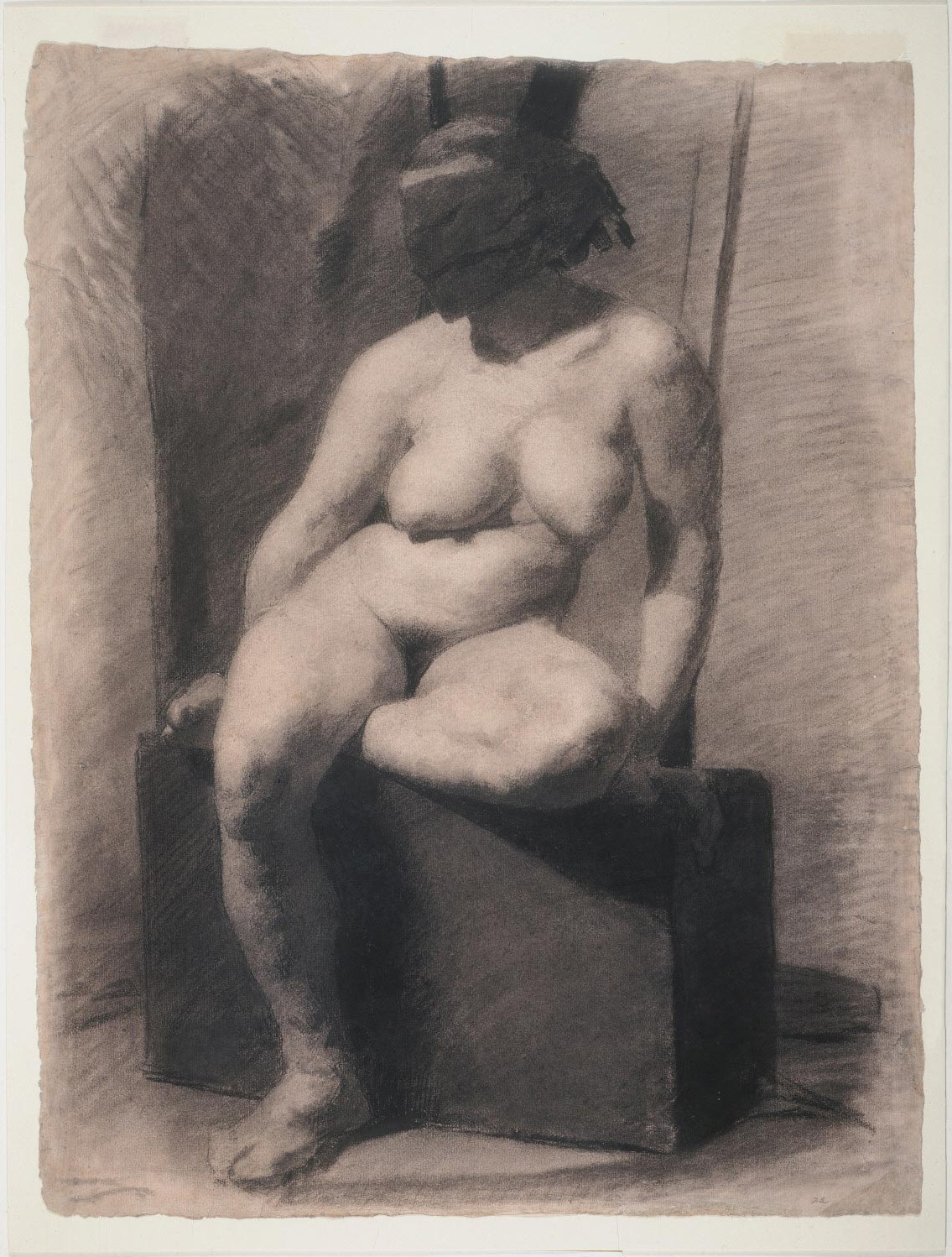
Masked nude, drawing by Thomas Eakins (c. 1863–1866)

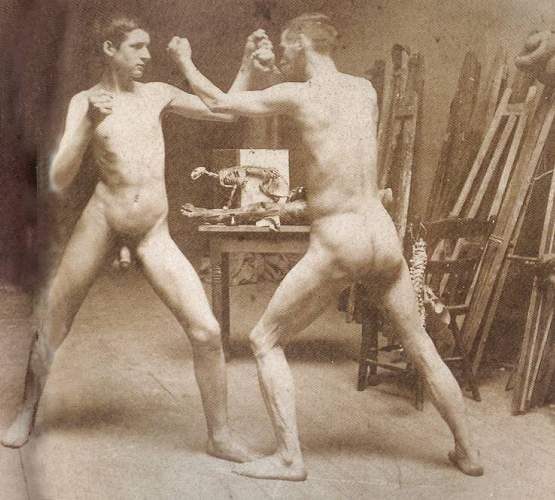
Two Boys Boxing at the Art Students League of Philadelphia, by Thomas Eakins

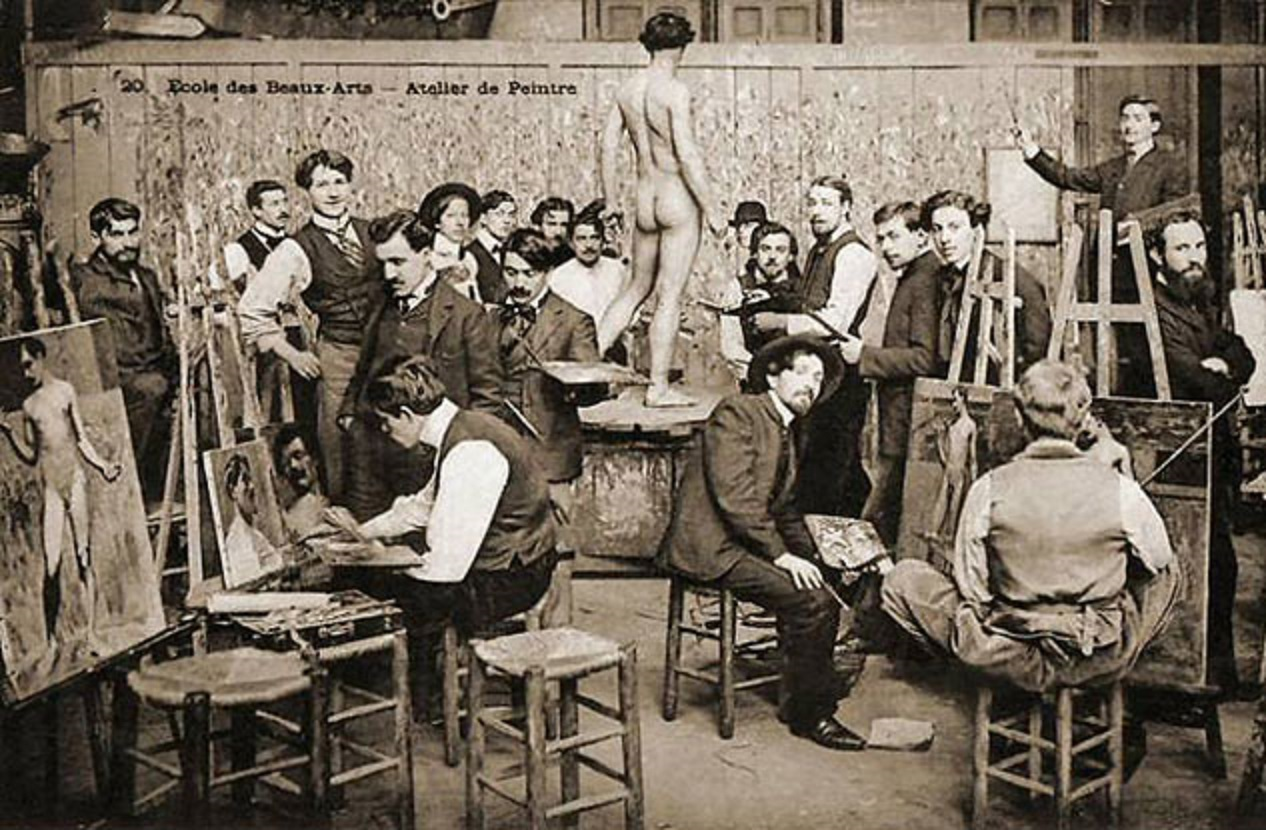
Male model posing at the École des Beaux-Arts in the 19th century. Women artists were excluded from the life room until late in that century.

In the United States, Victorian modesty sometimes required the female model to pose nude with her face draped (Masked Nude by Thomas Eakins, for example). In 1886, Eakins was dismissed from the Pennsylvania Academy of Fine Art for removing the loincloth from a male model in a mixed classroom.

Early 20th century
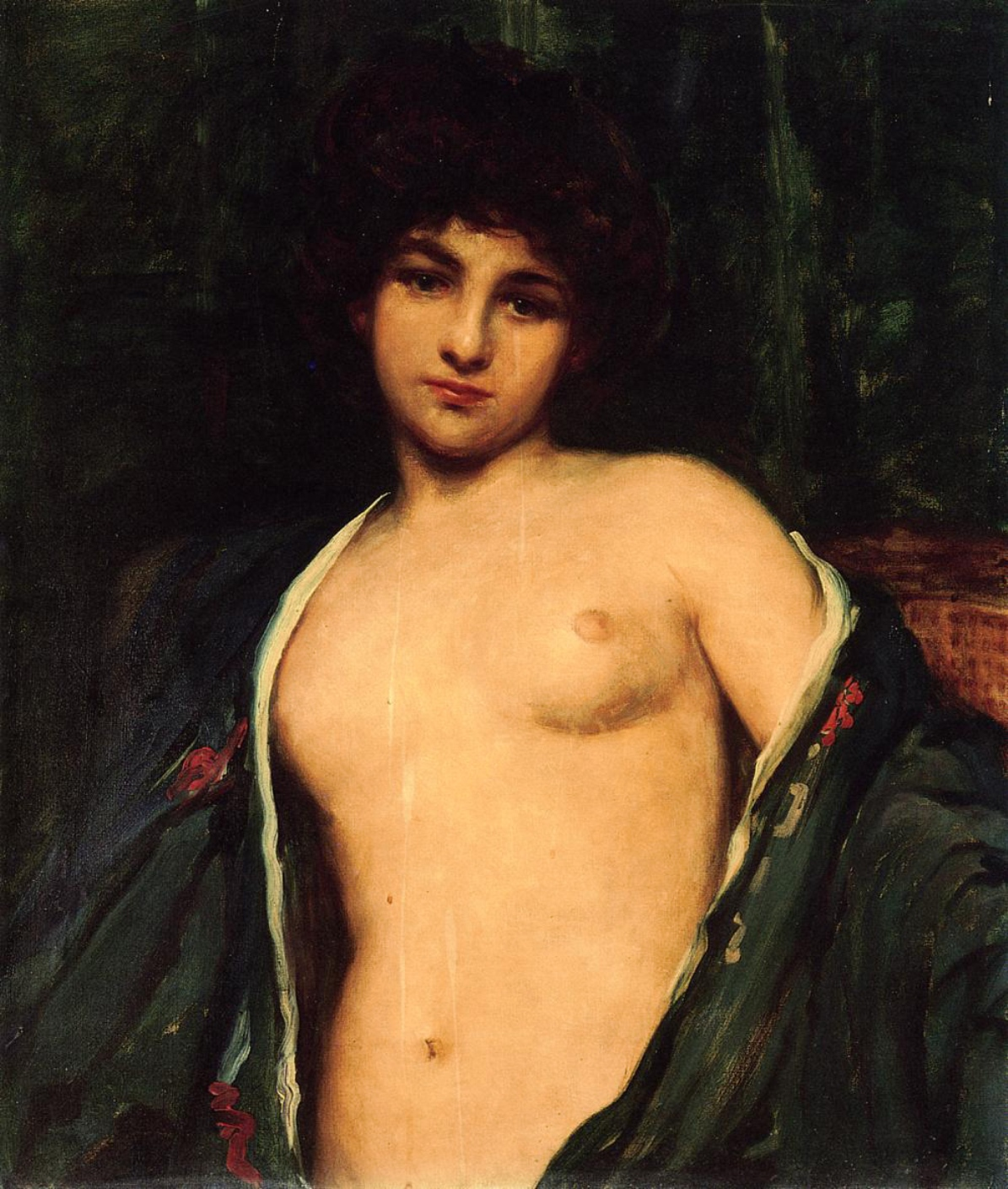
James Carroll Beckwith's c. 1901 portrait of Evelyn Nesbit, a popular American chorus girl and artists' model

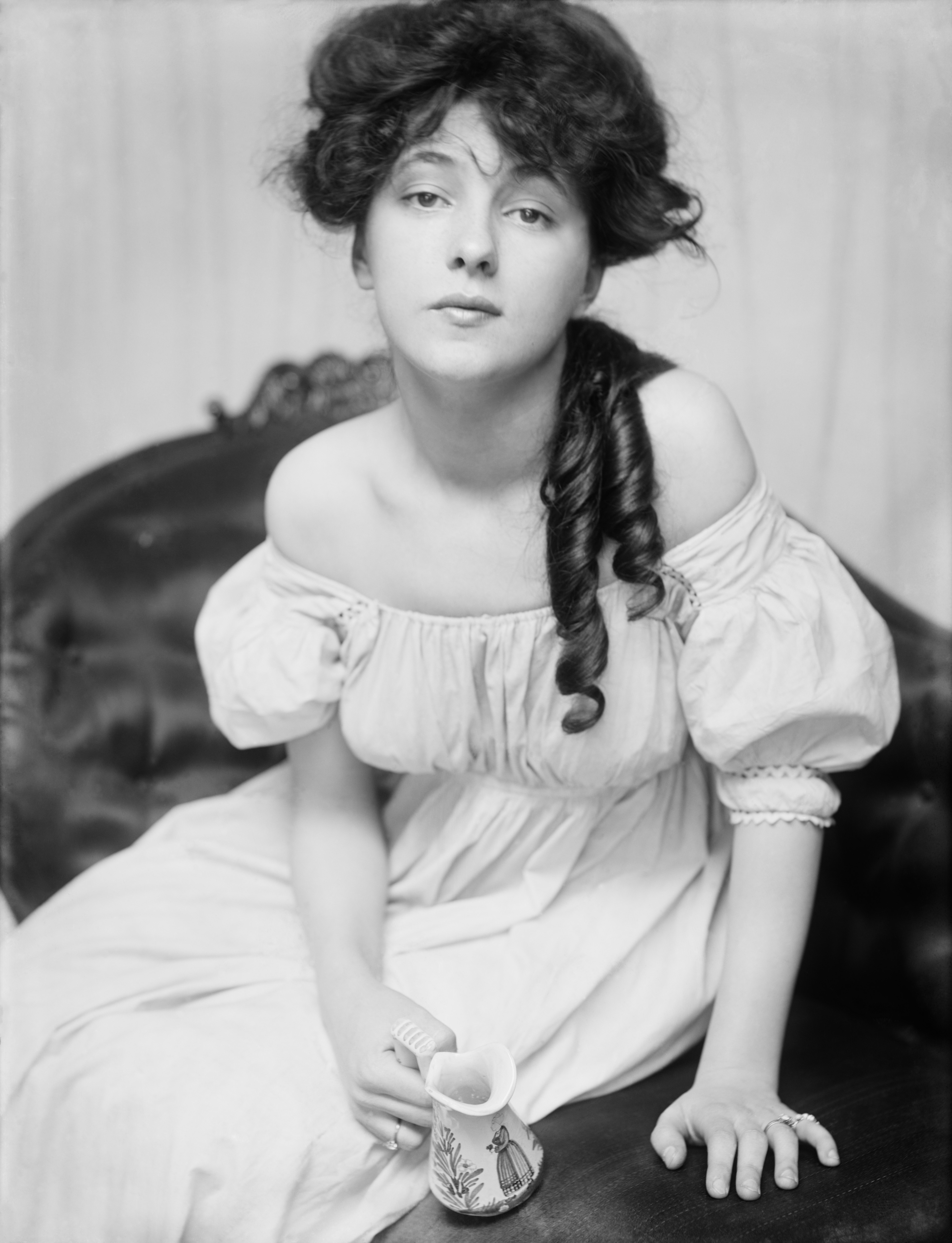
Photograph of Evelyn Nesbit by Gertrude Käsebier, 1903

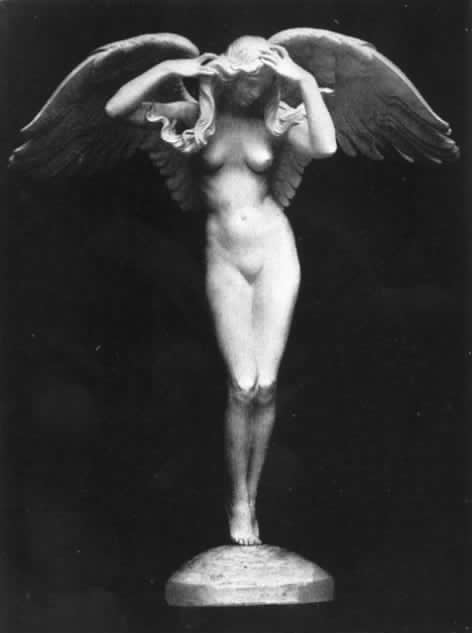
Fountain of the Setting Sun (1915) by Adolph Alexander Weinman, modeled by Audrey Munson

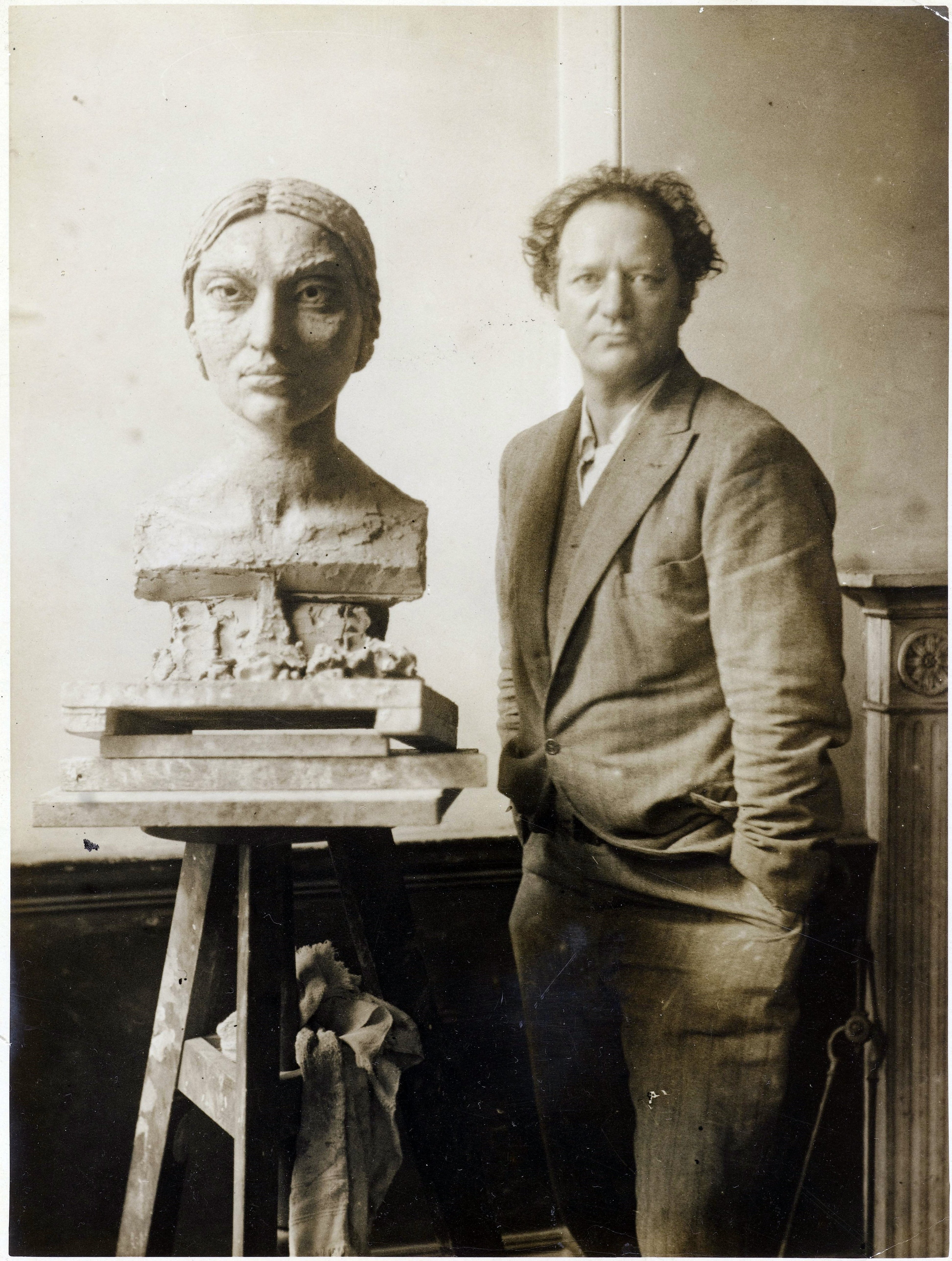
Bust of Kashmiri model Sunita Devi with the artist Jacob Epstein, c. 1926

In the postmodern era, the nude has returned to gain some acceptance in the art world, but not necessarily the art model. Figure drawing is offered in most art schools, but may not be required for a fine art degree. Peter Steinhart says that in trendy galleries, the nude has become passé, while according to Wendy Steiner there has been a revival in the importance of the figure as a source of beauty in contemporary art. Some established living artists work from models, but more work from photographs, or their imagination. Yet privately held open drawing sessions with a live model remain as popular as ever.

== See also ==
- The Helga Pictures – Series of paintings and drawings by Andrew Wyeth
- Artistic canons of body proportions – Criteria used in formal figurative art
- Fashion model – Person who demonstrates clothing designs
