= B. Anne Gehman =

American psychic medium and Spiritualist pastor

- Born: July 1, 1936; Petoskey, Michigan
- Died: February 18, 2024; Essex Junction, Vermont
- Occupations: Psychic medium, spiritualist healer
- Known for: The Priest and the Medium: The Amazing True Story of Psychic Medium B. Anne Gehman and Her Husband, Former Jesuit Priest Wayne Knoll, PhD (Hay House, 2009).
- Website: https://www.hayhouseu.com/experts/anne-gehman/

Beatrice Anne Gehman (July 1, 1936-2024) was an American psychic medium and the pastor of The Center for Spiritual Enlightenment, a Spiritualist church that she founded. She was one of the two main subjects of the book The Priest and the Medium (Hay House 2009), by spiritual teacher and author Suzanne Giesemann. She was also featured in the HBO documentary by Steven Cantor, "No One Dies in Lily Dale."

== Early life and education ==
She was born in Petoskey, Michigan, to Beatrice Elizabeth Reigle Gehman and John (Johannes) Gehman. She was the youngest of eight children in a financially struggling Amish Mennonite family. She was confirmed in the Mennonite faith at age 12. Petoskey was the home of the Chippewa (Ojibwe) and Ottawa (Odawa) people, and she felt a close relationship with Indian friends with whom she grew up. She also had a female Indian spirit guide. As a child she experienced psychic phenomena such as hearing rapping and tapping, and making a table levitate, later telling a Michigan reporter that she thought everybody experienced these things.

She left home at age 14 and moved to DeLand, Florida, where she held three part-time jobs and rented a room for $5 a week. She enrolled herself in Umatilla High School, where she was a majorette and cheerleader, transferring to DeLand High School in her senior year. She bought a cheap Studebaker that she drove under age. She won a full scholarship to St. Luke's School of Nursing, and worked as a physician's assistant in Deland, and later as a dental assistant. However, she struggled with loneliness and depression, leading to a suicide attempt at age 17, followed by what she described as both a near-death experience and an out-of-body experience, leading to a spiritual healing and her decision to return to her body.

"My favorite work, of course, is giving readings and helping to connect individuals with their departed loved ones from the other world; helping to bring the healing that comes from that. We often say that the real work of a medium is to give the proof of the continuity of life."

— International Association for Near-Death Studies lecture, Chicago, August 13, 2011

== Work as a psychic medium ==
She met medium Wilbur F. Hull, who operated from Cassadaga, a spiritualist community near Orlando, Florida, when her old Studebaker repeatedly stalled outside of his home. She eventually bought a house in Cassadaga and opened the Spiritual Research Society in Orlando, moving into spiritual work full-time. Hull taught her psychometry (the practice of reading objects such as rings, watches, and glasses for psychic information), and introduced her to Spiritualism, teaching her from books such as the J. Arthur Findlay classic The Rock of Truth. He unexpectedly introduced her from the speaker's platform at the Wonewoc Spiritualist Camp in Wonewoc, Wisconsin, and she gave her first talk there spontaneously at age 17, marking the beginning of her public work. The library at the Cassadaga Spiritualist Camp is now named for her. In 1960 she became the youngest psychic to receive accreditation from the National Spiritualist Association of Churches, and she held National Spiritualist Teacher, Certified Medium, and Commissioned Healer credentials from that group, as well as acting as an Appointed Missionary.

Through her gift for dowsing, she consulted for the Philips Petroleum Company, helping to locate drill sites for gas and oil, work that she later distanced herself from as damaging the earth. She also worked with geologists and rangers from the National Park Service, most notably when the latter invited her to the Eisenhower National Historic Site, said to be haunted by the spirit of Mamie Eisenhower. Gehman determined that there were multiple spirits (Mrs. Eisenhower, a woman who worked for her as a maid, and Indians who had previously occupied the land). She advised local and state police, the Royal Canadian mounted police, and the FBI, numerous times to solve missing persons cases, including Ted Bundy's final crime. In 1973 she described where to find the body of a missing Alexandria, Virginia man to his family, after touching clothing he had worn (psychometry) and viewing photographs. She sometimes advised other psychics in these searches. After she moved to Northern Virginia near Washington, DC, she led a regular meditation group at the Pentagon. She was also a practitioner of spoon bending.

She served on the Morris Pratt Institute board, and on the NSAC Board of Trustees. Besides the Center for Spiritual Enlightenment, she founded the Knoll Institute for Spiritual Studies. She was an elected member of the International Congress of Parapsychology and Psychotronics in Prague, occasionally researched by groups such as the CIA. In 1999, University of Arizona scientists invited her to participate in human energy research. This work at the Human Energy Systems Laboratory was documented in a book by professor Gary Schwartz and William L. Simon, with a foreword by Deepak Chopra, The Afterlife Experiments.

== Books ==
Besides The Priest and the Medium, 38 other books discuss her work, including Ruth Shilling's Rev. B. Anne Gehman: About Life, Love, Mediumship, and the Spirit World (Through a Medium's Eyes), Jess Stearn's Adventures into the Psychic and Miracle Workers, and Harold Sherman's You Can Communicate with the Unseen World. She was the author, with news personality Ellen Ratner, of Self Empowerment: Nine Things the 19th Century Can Teach Us About Living in the 21st.

== Beliefs ==
She believed that "everyone is psychic." However, she specified that she did not believe in reincarnation, palm reading, or astrology, claiming it was often "a lot of bunk." She told an audience in Michigan in 1989, "I think New Agers need to be real careful of not being involved in things that are flaky and have no basis... I think there's a lot of hokum pokum, and we have to be careful of that. I think someone who is truly gifted is someone who doesn't have to advertise. You don't have to burn candles. You don't have to have crystals." She felt it was healthy to be wary, but to remain "an open-minded skeptic." She accepted the life and work of Jesus Christ, believed he was "the ideal man," and encouraged her husband Wayne Knoll to remain a Catholic in his faith, although he was also a Spiritualist and maintained that there was no conflict.

== Personal life ==
On September 20, 1995, she married Wayne Knoll, an English professor at Georgetown University and a former Jesuit priest who had left the Society of Jesus 25 years earlier and had been married once before. Their story is told in the 2009 book by Suzanne Giesemann, The Priest and the Medium. She had been married and divorced twice before, and she had a grown daughter, Rhonda Anne (b. 1971) from her first marriage. The Knolls lived in Northern Virginia near his job in Washington, DC, and they often visited her longtime second home in Lily Dale, New York, famous for its psychics and healers. They kept additional retreat property that Wayne Knoll had bought years earlier on the western slope of Old Rag Mountain, near the Shenandoah National Park. Wayne Knoll died in 2013 at the age of 80. The Church of the Living Spirit in Lily Dale, New York, where Gehman was a pastor, reported her death in early 2024.
