= Wild in the Streets (disambiguation) =

Wild in the Streets is a 1968 film.

Wild in the Streets may also refer to:

- "Wild in the Streets", 1973 song by Garland Jeffreys
- Wild in the Streets (Circle Jerks album), 1982
- Wild in the Streets (Helix album), 1987
- Wild in the Streets, 1968 album by Davie Allan and the Arrows
- Recruits – Wild in the Streets, 1986 album by Thor
- "Wild in the Streets", a song by Bon Jovi from Slippery When Wet
- Wild in the Streets, a 2012 documentary by Peter Baxter
