= Who the Fuck Is That Guy? The Fabulous Journey of Michael Alago =

2017 documentary film by Drew Stone

"Who The Fuck Is That Guy?" The Fabulous Journey Of Michael Alago
- Directed by: Drew Stone
- Written by: Drew Stone
- Produced by: Drew Stone, Michael Alex
- Edited by: Drew Stone
- Music by: Jason Newsted, The Dead Boys, Nina Simone
- Distributed by: XLrator Media
- Release date: July 21, 2017
- Running time: 72 minutes
- Country: United States
- Language: English

"Who The Fuck Is That Guy?" The Fabulous Journey Of Michael Alago, is a documentary film directed, written and edited by Drew Stone. A Stone Films NYC Production in Association with Rugged Entertainment and distributed by XLrator Media, the film documents the life of artists and repertoire (A&R) man Michael Alago.

== Synopsis ==
The documentary tells the story of gay Puerto Rican A&R executive Michael Alago who grew up in a Hasidic neighborhood in Brooklyn in the early 1970s. At a young age, he began sneaking out of his house and going downtown to frequent legendary New York clubs CBGB and Max's Kansas City. He formed The Dead Boys Fan club as a teenager and soon after became the talent booker at the Ritz nightclub in the East Village. At 24, he became the A&R executive that signed Metallica and went on to work with the Misfits, Cyndi Lauper, Nina Simone and John Lydon. Surviving both substance abuse and AIDS he came out on the other end clean, sober and healthy. Reinventing himself as photographer and writer he looks into the future with a healthy, sober lifestyle and attitude.

== Reception ==
"The movie doesn't flinch from its subject's demons, either, recounting Alago's descent into addiction and his narrow brush with death after being diagnosed HIV positive, but unlike many an episode of Behind the Music, this one has a happy ending." – Variety

"This friendly doc is one more small chapter in the ongoing oral history of Downtown Manhattan around the turn of the Eighties, and will be appreciated by those who just can't hear enough." – The Hollywood Reporter

== Production ==
The film was shot over the course of a three-year period from 2013–2016 in New York, Los Angeles and New Orleans. An additional year was spent clearing photos and music. Archival material was provided by Alago.

== Soundtrack ==
Music by Jason Newsted, The Dead Boys, Nina Simone, Generation Kill & Borgo Pass. Original soundtrack by John Graves and Peter Spirer.
