= Mark Mori =

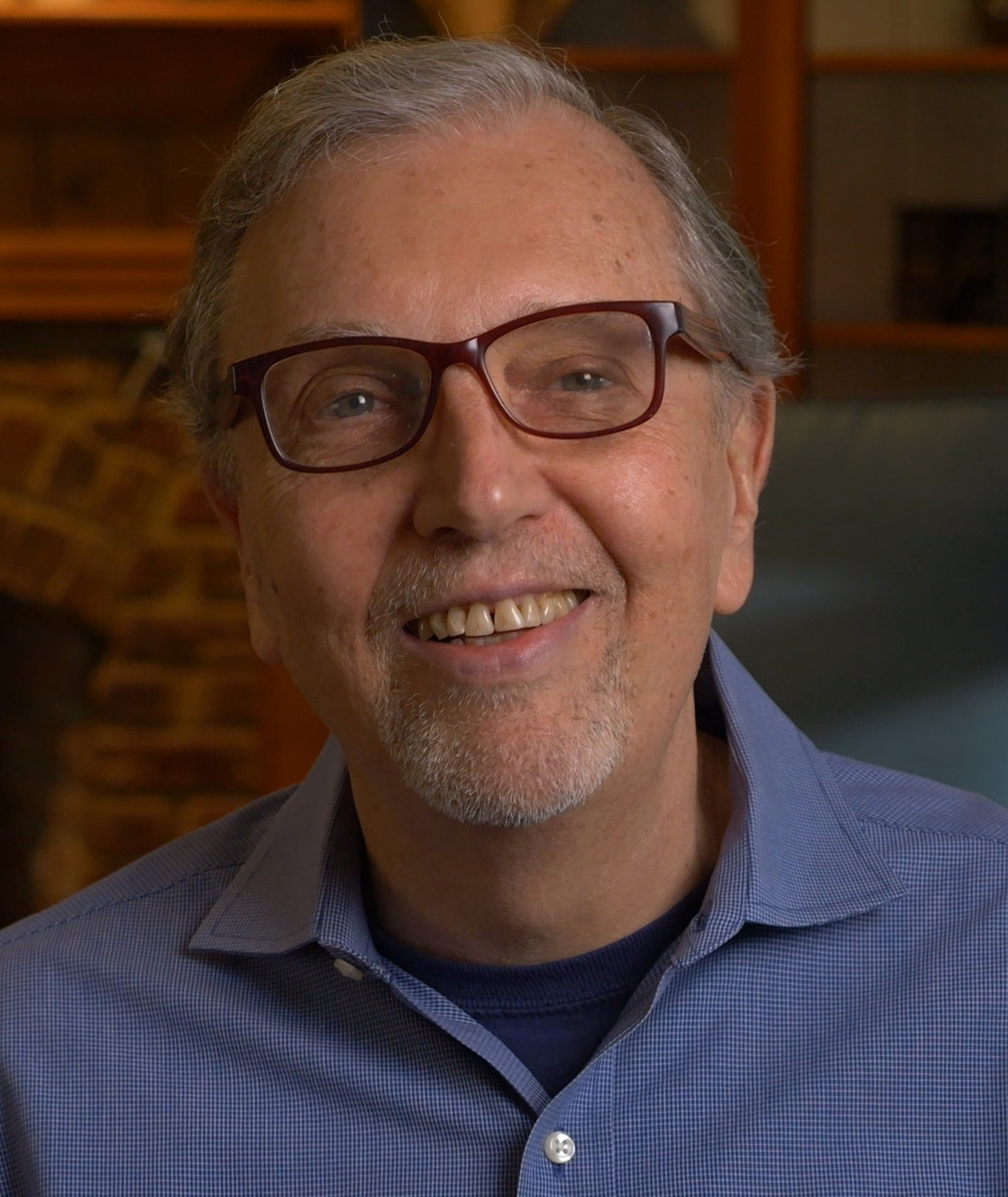
- Mori in 2026
- Occupations: Director, producer, writer
- Years active: 1989–present
- Website: https://www.baristasvsbillionaires.com/

Mark Mori is an Academy Award-nominated and Emmy Award-winning American documentary filmmaker, television producer and screenwriter of documentary and reality television series and specials. Mori is the president and founder of Single Spark Pictures.

== Film ==
=== Building Bombs ===
Mori's first documentary film Building Bombs had a limited theatrical release in 1989. It was nominated for a 1990 Academy Award and was re-released in 1991. Mori produced and directed the film with Susan J. Robinson. Narrated by Jane Alexander, the film documents the Savannah River Plant nuclear bomb factory in Aiken, South Carolina which was used to make vast quantities of fissile material for the United States nuclear arsenal. Building Bombs was restored by the Academy Film Archive and re-released in 2024.

=== Blood Ties: The Life and Work of Sally Mann ===
Blood Ties: The Life and Work of Sally Mann is a 1994 short subject documentary film directed by Steven Cantor. Mori was the Executive Producer on the film. It was nominated for an Academy Award for Best Documentary Short Subject.

=== The Fire This Time ===
Mori co-produced The Fire This Time, a 1993 documentary examining the causes and aftermath of the 1992 Los Angeles riots. The film was nominated for the Grand Jury Prize at the Sundance Film Festival and later received a Writers Guild of America nomination in the Current Affairs category.

=== Bettie Page Reveals All ===
Mori produced and directed Bettie Page Reveals All (2012), a documentary about model Bettie Page featuring one of her final recorded interviews. The film received a theatrical release and won Best Documentary awards at the Garden State Film Festival and CineKink Film Festival.

=== Current projects ===
Mori is executive producer of Exiled from Hollywood: Orson Welles' Lost Masterpiece, a documentary examining the lost director's cut of filmmaker Orson Welles' masterpiece, The Magnificent Ambersons, and his subsequent expulsion from Hollywood.

He also serves as writer, producer, and director of Baristas vs. Billionaires, a documentary about the Starbucks unionization movement in Buffalo, New York and the broader labor organizing efforts of Starbucks workers in the United States.

== Television series ==
=== Raw Footage ===
Mori was the showrunner and producer on Raw Footage, the first original series on The Independent Film Channel (IFC) hosted Alec Baldwin featuring interviews with independent film directors.

=== To Tell The Truth ===
Mori was an executive producer on To Tell the Truth, a series of 51 classic documentaries hosted by Alec Baldwin for Turner Classic Movies.

=== Wayne Williams and the Atlanta Child Murders ===
Mori directed and executive produced Wayne Williams and the Atlanta Child Murders, a true-crime television documentary produced by Court TV. The film explores the infamous Atlanta Child Murders of 1979–1981, delving into the investigation, trial, and conviction of Wayne Williams.

=== Kent State: The Day the War Came Home ===
Kent State: The Day the War Came Home, directed by Chris Triffo and executive produced by Mark Mori featured interviews with injured students, eyewitnesses, guardsmen, and relatives of students killed at Kent State shootings on May 4, 1970. It was released by The Learning Channel (TLC) in 2000 and received the Emmy award for Outstanding Background/Analysis of a Single Current Story.

=== Dead North ===
Mori was a supervising producer on Dead North, a highly rated 4-part true crime docuseries on Investigation Discovery. The series chronicles the 2014 investigation into the disappearance of Chris Regan.
