= Immediate Family =

Immediate Family may refer to:

- Immediate family
- Immediate Family (film), a 1989 drama film
- Immediate Family (book), a 1992 photography book by Sally Mann
