= Still Time (book) =

Book by Sally Mann

- Cover
- Author: Sally Mann
- Language: English
- Genre: Photography
- Publisher: Aperture
- Publication date: 1994
- Pages: 80
- ISBN: 9780893815936
- Preceded by: Immediate Family
- Followed by: What Remains

Still Time is a 1994 photography book by Sally Mann. The book is published by Aperture and was released alongside Mann's exhibition for the photographs. The book consists of 60 four-color and duotone images of landscapes as well as abstract photography and images of Mann's children, some of which have been collected from her previous book, Immediate Family. The cover image is a photograph of Mann's 7-year-old daughter Jessie, who is pictured topless with her chest covered by nightblooming cereus. The book opens with a quote from Eric Ormsby's Childhood House, and images focus on the theme of the passing of time.

The book is not to be confused with the 1988 catalogue of the same name, also by Sally Mann.

== Legal case ==
In 2010 a man was convicted of level 1 child pornography for owning four books, including Still Time as well as The Age of Innocence by David Hamilton, which he purchased from a bookstore in Walthamstow, London.

His conviction was overturned on appeal in 2011, with the judge calling his conviction "very unfair" and criticising the Crown Prosecution Service (CPS) for prosecuting him. The judge noted that Still Time was available from various bookshops and had also been on sale at an art gallery, but the CPS took no action against the gallery or the bookstores.
