= Suzane Northrop =

American psychic medium

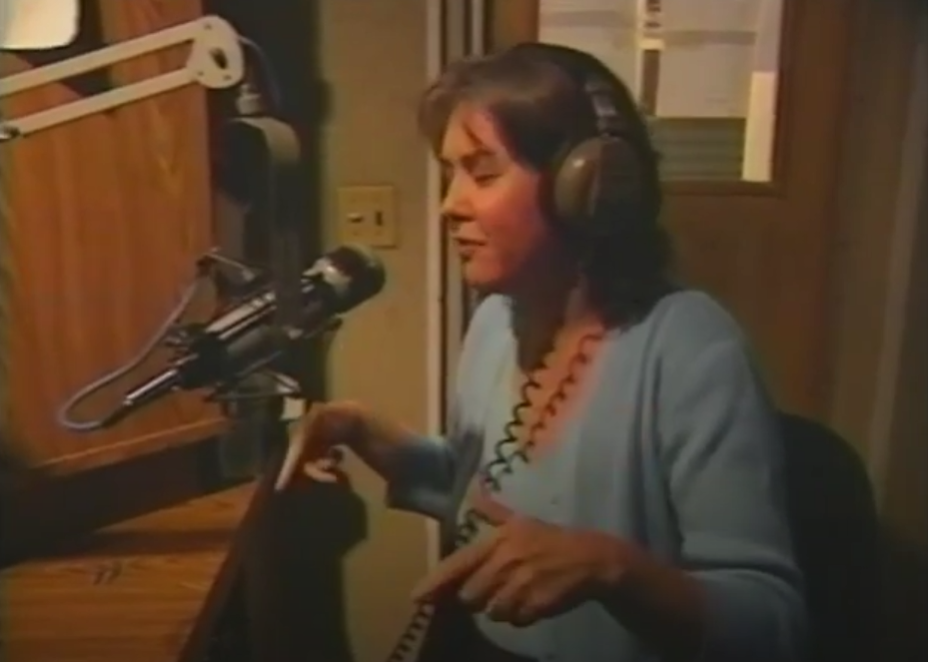
- Occupation: Self-described psychic medium
- Website: www.suzanenorthrop.com

Suzane Northrop is an American writer, podcaster, TV show host, and psychic medium. She has written at least four books, and hosted the television show, The Afterlife with Suzane Northrop. She participated in The Afterlife Experiments which was turned into a book by Gary Schwartz. The experiments and their conclusions were widely criticized across the scientific community for not being blinded, and for the lack of inclusion of any other scientifically credible evidence.

== Early life ==
Suzane Northrop stated in an interview that her first memory of contact with the deceased occurred when she was five years old. However, in both that interview and in an earlier one with the Dayton Daily News, Northrop said that her first real contact with dead people happened when she was 13 when she spoke with her paternal grandmother who had just died the previous week. She received a music degree from the California State University, Los Angeles, in 1979. She soon moved to New York City where she attempted composing as well as dance.

== Mediumship career ==
=== Career highlights ===
Northrop started her mediumship career by giving readings at street fairs in New York City for $3. She published her first book in 1994, Séance: A Guide for Living, and went on to publish three more books over the next decade. In 2008, Northrop hosted a ten-episode TV series called The Afterlife with Suzane Northrop. In August 2020, Northrop launched a podcast, The Dead People's Society Podcast. Late in 2020, Northrop, along with Thomas John, hosted a ticketed event virtually where they provided readings and over the internet to several of the people in attendance.

=== The Afterlife Experiments ===
In 1997, Northrop was contacted by Elisabeth Kübler-Ross about appearing in a documentary being produced for HBO which would explore the question of the survival of consciousness after death. This would later become the HBO documentary Life After Life. Gary Schwartz and Linda Russek, who were involved in the project, wrote a very controversial book about the research he conducted during these sessions, The Afterlife Experiments. Schwartz describes Northrop's style as very fast, "an uninterrupted barrage of information...Northrup had begun talking virtually nonstop". Schwartz' findings were that Northrop, as well as the rest of the "highly skilled mediums, in laboratory controlled yet supportive conditions, can receive specific categories of information that can be rated accurately by trained research sitters."

According to Schwartz, he and Russek set up a second set of experiments at the urging of John Edward and Northrop which were set up with a new group of sitters and four of the five original mediums including Northrop. Schwartz refers to this as The Miraval Experiment. The goal of this second round of experiments was to replicate the findings of the original HBO show and expand on them with further quantitative data. Schwartz wrote about their findings in this second round of experiments "that the accuracy of mediums 1 and 2 (Edward and Northrop) was replicated" and provided data "that are consistent with the hypothesis that some form of anomalous information retrieval was occurring in these skilled mediums."

This would lead to staff of the show Exploring the Unknown, produced by Michael Shermer, to call asking to do a segment on Northrop.

== Mediumship criticism ==
=== Exploring the Unknown ===
In 1999, Northrop was profiled on the TV show Exploring the Unknown produced by Michael Shermer. In that episode, Northrop is seen giving a reading over the radio. Mentalist Mark Edward was asked to explain how Northrop accomplished what appears to be talking to dead family members of the participants in the show. Edward said of Northrop that, “The technique is to talk really fast. Say a lot of things, so fast that the normal average person doesn’t have a chance to respond or reconstruct what you just said.” He further explains how Northrop can easily overcome incorrect or unrelated guesses by telling the sitter to "watch for it" and that she also provides statements that could have multiple meanings to give herself the widest latitude for turning a miss into a hit. Edward also provides the reasons behind her use of initials which have a much higher hit rate and can relate to almost anything.

=== How Not To Test Mediums ===
Northrop uses The Afterlife Experiments as evidence of her abilities. However, in his article, How Not To Test Mediums, Ray Hyman does a deep dive into The Afterlife Experiments and concludes that there were several major flaws in the experimental designs including the failure to use double-blind procedures, inadequate precautions against fraud and sensory leakage, failure to independently check on facts the sitters endorsed as true, and several others. Hyman also finds severe issues with Schwartz' interpretations of the data, such as creating non-falsifiable outcomes by reinterpreting failures as successes. In his conclusion, Hyman states that, "The studies were methodologically defective in a number of important ways, not the least of which was that they were not double-blind... Yet the experimenters offer the results as a "breathtaking" validation of their claims about the existence of the afterlife."

== Bibliography ==
- Séance: A Guide for Living
- Second Chance: Healing Messages from the Afterlife
- Everything Happens for a Reason: Love, Free Will, and the Lessons of the Soul
- A Medium’s Cookbook: Recipes for the Soul: A Step-By-Step Guide toward Creating a Banquet of Connections to Those Who Have Passed Over

== See also ==
- Ann O'Delia Diss Debar ("One of the most extraordinary fake mediums... the world has ever known" -Houdini)
- Char Margolis
- Flim-Flam! (Psychics, ESP, Unicorns and other Delusions)
- Fortune telling fraud
- Houdini's debunking of psychics and mediums
- James Van Praagh
- John Edward
- Linda and Terry Jamison
- Long Island Medium
- Mark Edward
- Matt Fraser (psychic)
- Monica the Medium
- Psychic Blues: Confessions of a Conflicted Medium
- Rose Mackenberg (Historic investigator of psychic mediums)
- Sylvia Browne
- Thomas John Flanagan
- Tyler Henry
