= Rugged Entertainment =

American media production company

- Type: Limited Liability Company
- Industry: Motion Picture
- Founded: 2007
- Headquarters: Los Angeles, California, United States
- Website: http://www.ruggedentertainment.com

Rugged Entertainment LLC is a full service film and media production company, founded in 2007 by Academy Award Nominated Director Peter Spirer after his tenures at QD3 Entertainment Aslan Productions and Metropolis Films.

Rugged Entertainment secured a multi-picture documentary and narrative deal with distributor Image Entertainment/RLJ. In 2007, and again in 2015, the company joined forces with Barry Gordon and XLrator Media to produce feature-length content for worldwide distribution. That partnership concluded in 2019. Since then, Rugged has continued to produce and distribute content across multiple platforms.

== Rugged Films & Projects ==
In 1993 the short documentary Blood Ties: The Life and Work of Sally Mann was nominated for an Academy Award.

Spirer's documentary Rhyme and Reason (1997) made Rolling Stone's 40 Greatest Rock Documentary list.

In 2003, Spirer was the winner of the Jury Award for the Ojai Film Festival for his debut narrative feature film Dunsmore.

Spirer has produced a number of musician focused documentary films, including Rhyme and Reason, Another Reason to Rhyme, Beef I-III, Tupac: Thug Angel, and Notorious B.I.G.: Bigger Than Life. Many of his films play regularly on cable television networks.

Ghostride The Whip (2008) that takes the viewer into the world of this phenomenon that started in San Francisco's bay area several years ago. At times, through a historical perspective, the film brings to light the elements and trends that may have been responsible for the origins of ghostriding. The documentary also explores the demographic that most appeals to this art form and the lifestyles of those that regularly participate in it.

In 2009, the feature film Just Another Day, starring Wood Harris and Jamie Hector (both from HBO's The Wire), was released and distributed by Image Entertainment.

Smash (2009 and rereleased in 2020) gives a look inside a biannual school bus race in Florida, a harrowing event where carnage and collisions are most definitely encouraged.

Kiss and Tail: The Hollywood Jump Off (2009) shows the underworld of hip-hop groupies and video vixens where sex is the backstage pass and young ladies use their bodies as a way to promote themselves and further their own careers.

Rhyme and Punishment (2011) takes an in-depth look at the role of prison in hip hop culture, and reveals the side of the story that is not being covered by the news and popular media. Featuring intimate and compelling interviews with convicted rappers Beanie Sigel, Prodigy, Cassidy, Project Pat, Immortal Technique, Slick Rick and many more. These artists who were at the top of their game when they got locked up explain the details of the crimes that led to their arrests, and document their struggles to deal with the shocking brutality of incarcerated life.

Soulja Boy: The Movie (2011) follows the Soulja Boy, and offers an all access glimpse into his life, his music, and his career.

In 2016, Rugged helped produce a film titled Queen Mimi. The documentary looks into the life of Mimi, an unhoused woman who went from living in a laundromat to walking down the red carpet with Zach Galifianakis.

Who The Fuck Is That Guy? The Fabulous Journey of Michael Alago (2017) examines the life and career of Michael Alago, a gay Puerto Rican kid from Brooklyn who went on to shape and reinvent the world's musical landscape—first as a 19-year-old talent booker at the legendary Ritz nightclub in New York City and then as a 24-year-old A&R executive who signed Metallica, White Zombie and worked with other notable artists including Nina Simone, John Lydon and Cyndi Lauper.

First premiering on STARZ, Spirit Game: Pride of the Nation (2017) offers an insider's look into the Iroquois Nationals lacrosse team; the first-ever international lacrosse championship held on sovereign land. Spirer produced the film which won Best Documentary at the Red Nation Film Festival.

The Legend of 420 (2017) Explores the controversial use of marijuana and the evolution of mainstream society, from a dangerous narcotic listed as a Schedule 1 Drug substance since the 1970s, to the rush to decriminalize it today. What has changed and why? What will the cannabis industry look like in five years? Will it retain its integrity as a homegrown industry or be co-opted by Big Business? Experts, growers, celebrities and politicians weigh in on the future of Canna-business.

The Giant Killer (2017) The true story of the smallest Green Beret soldier who became a war hero-only to be killed homeless and alone, whose life and death are shrouded in mystery.

Michael Des Barres: Who do you want me to be? (2020) focuses on the son of a junkie aristocrat and a schizophrenic showgirl becomes the master of reinvention on a 50+ year journey through rock and roll, TV, and film.

Disarm Hate (2020) follows nine members of the LGBTQ community as they come together after the Pulse nightclub massacre to join one man, a hairdresser and activist from New Jersey without political experience; as he builds a national rally to demand LGBTQIA equal rights, fight the NRA and challenge America's obsession with gun violence.

First released in 1979 (rereleased in 2021), The War at Home was nominated for an Academy Award. for Best Feature Documentary and went on to win top awards at the U.S. Film Festival (Sundance) and the Chicago International Film Festival, just a few years after the war in Vietnam came to an end.

Bobcats on Three (2021) is a powerful documentary following the Paradise High School girls’ basketball team after the most devastating fire in California history destroys their entire town.

The documentary Sacheen (2021) is a short documentary film that focused on Sacheen Littlefeather, an activist for Native American civil rights, and her telling of her life's story, including her speech on behalf of Marlon Brando at the 45th Academy Awards and later embrace of traditional Native American medicine. While the then-71-year-old presented herself as a "White Mountain Apache and Yaqui elder", she was in fact a pretendian, of Spanish-Mexican descent and with no tribal ties.

Bob and the Monster (2011–2021) follows outspoken indie-rock hero Bob Forrest, through his life-threatening struggle with addiction, to his transformation into of the most influential and controversial drug counselors in the US today. The film crafts contemporary footage and compelling interviews with archival performances to reveal the complex layers of this troubled, but hopeful soul. Features Thelonius Monster, Anthony Kiedis, Flea, John Frusciante & Courtney Love.

Photowalks (2021) Follows Jefferson Graham and his cameras as they explore exotic locales like Portugal (Porto and Lisbon), the big island of Hawaii and all 363 miles of the Oregon Coast, as well as urban Los Angeles, from LAX to DTLA, the islands of Catalina and Balboa and the Central California Coast beach towns of Morro Bay and Cayucos.

Drew Stone’s Hardcore Chronicles (2021) address the community, culture, straight edge and DIY ethic of the hardcore scene that is still vibrant, relevant and going strong to this day.

Roadie: My Documentary (2021) spans the 20-year career of roadie turned filmmaker, TJ Hoffmann as he takes you behind the scenes and on the run with rock-n-roll road crews. Filmed in a handful of countries over the course of 10 years, Roadie begins as a quest to find out why anyone would want to become one but over time another narrative is discovered as TJ, the man behind the camera is forced to confront his inner demons.

Cuba My Soul (2025) is an immersive documentary on Cuba's rich, untapped musical heritage at a time of great socio-political changes. Over two eventful concerts in Havana, many of Cuba's finest musicians share their passion on and off stage.

Baby Brother (2025) is a narrative drama film set around the theme of broken love between two brothers. The film tells the story of Adam and his vulnerable younger brother Liam across two separate days, five years apart.
