= Sally Mann =

American photographer (born 1951)

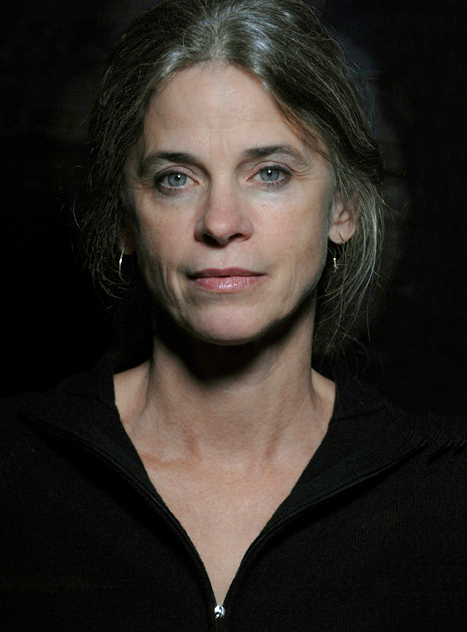
- Mann in 2007
- Born: Sally Turner Munger; May 1, 1951 (age 75); Lexington, Virginia, U.S.
- Education: Hollins College (BFA, MA)
- Known for: Photography
- Awards: National Endowment for the Arts Individual Artist Fellowship: 1982, 1988, 1992; Guggenheim Fellowship, 1987; Honorary Doctor of Fine Arts from the Corcoran College of Art and Design, 2006; Honorary Fellowship of The Royal Photographic Society, 2012; Andrew Carnegie Medal for Excellence in Nonfiction, 2016; Centenary Medal from the RPS, 2020; Prix Pictet, 2021; Sally Mann's voice Mann speaks about using her camera Recorded December 5, 2024

Sally Mann (born Sally Turner Munger; May 1, 1951) is an American photographer known for making large format black and white photographs of people and places in her immediate surroundings: her children, husband, and rural landscapes, as well as self-portraits.

== Early life and education ==
Born on May 1, 1951, in Lexington, Virginia, Mann was the third of three children. Her father, Robert S. Munger, was a general practitioner, and her mother, Elizabeth Evans Munger, ran the bookstore at Washington and Lee University in Lexington. Mann was introduced to photography by her father, who encouraged her interest; his 5x7 camera became the basis of her use of large-format cameras today. Mann began to photograph when she was sixteen.

Most of her photographs and writings are tied to Lexington, Virginia. Mann graduated from The Putney School in 1969, and attended Bennington College and Friends World College. She earned a BA summa cum laude from Hollins College (now Hollins University) in 1974 and an MA in creative writing in 1975.

She took up photography at Putney where she has said her motive was to be alone in the darkroom with her boyfriend. Mann has never had any formal training in photography and she "never read[s] about photography".

== Early career ==
After graduation from Hollins College, Mann worked as a photographer at Washington and Lee University. In the mid-1970s she photographed the construction of its new law school building, the Lewis Hall (now the Sydney Lewis Hall). These photographs were the basis of her first solo exhibition in late 1977 at the Corcoran Gallery of Art in Washington, D.C. The Corcoran Gallery of Art published a catalogue of Mann's images titled "The Lewis Law Portfolio". Some of the images had a surreal aspect; they were also included as part of her first book, Second Sight, published in 1984.

While Mann explored a variety of genres as she was maturing in the 1970s, she truly found her trade with her book, At Twelve: Portraits of Young Women (Aperture, 1988).

In 1995, she was featured in an issue of Aperture: "On Location with: Henri Cartier-Bresson, Graciela Iturbide, Barbara Kruger, Sally Mann, Andres Serrano, Clarissa Sligh" which was illustrated with photographs.

=== At Twelve: Portraits of Young Women ===
"Untitled" by Mann (1988)

Her second collection, At Twelve: Portraits of Young Women, published in 1988, stimulated minor controversy. The images "captured the confusing emotions and developing identities of adolescent girls [and the] expressive printing style lent a dramatic and brooding mood to all of her images". In the preface to the book, author Ann Beattie wrote "when a girl is twelve years old, she often wants – or says she wants – less involvement with adults. ... [It is] a time in which the girls yearn for freedom and adults feel their own grip on things becoming a little tenuous, as they realize that they have to let their children go."

Beattie says that Mann's photographs do not "glamorize the world, but they don't make it into something more unpleasant than it is, either". The girls photographed in this series are shown "vulnerable in their youthfulness" but Mann focuses on the strength that the girls possess.

Referring to "Untitled", an image from the book shown here, Mann says that the young girl was extremely reluctant to stand closer to her mother's boyfriend. Mann said that she thought it was strange because "it was their peculiar familiarity that had provoked this photograph in the first place". Mann did not want to crop out the girl's elbow but the girl refused to move in closer. According to Mann, several months later, the girl's mother shot her boyfriend in the face with a .22. In court the mother "testified that while she worked nights at a local truck stop he was 'at home partying and harassing my daughter.'" Mann said "the child put it to me somewhat more directly". Mann says that she now looks at this photograph with "a jaggy chill of realization".

=== Immediate Family and controversy ===
Mann became widely known for Immediate Family, her third collection, first exhibited in 1990 by Edwynn Houk Gallery in New York City and published as a monograph in 1992. In a cover story for The New York Times Magazine, Richard B. Woodward wrote that "probably no photographer in history has enjoyed such a burst of success in the art world". The article detailed a federal prosecutor having informed Mann that "no fewer than eight pictures she had chosen for the traveling exhibition ["Immediate Family"] could subject her to arrest."

Immediate Family appeared at a time when politicians were cracking down on even the suspicion of child pornography to appeal to their constituents, forcing artists to justify their work and leading many to self-censor. According to writer Bruce Handy, the Christian right conflated naturalistic nudes of children by Mann and Jock Sturges with sexualized images by photographers such as David Hamilton.

Mann considered these photographs to be "natural through the eyes of a mother since she has seen her children in every state: happy, sad, playful, sick, bloodied, angry and even naked". Deborah Chambers, in her work on family photo albums, reflects on their idyllic nature but also argues they rarely convey the actual experience of the family. Mann's work takes these idyllic photos meant for semi-private consumption and brings them to the public sphere. By working collaboratively with her children, Mann uses these idealized family photos to create a narrative from her children's perspectives. Critics agreed, saying her "vision in large measure [is] accurate and a welcome corrective to familiar notions of youth as a time of unalloyed sweetness and innocence". They said that the book "created a place that looked like Eden, then cast upon it the subdued and shifting light of nostalgia, sexuality, and death".

When Time magazine named her "America's Best Photographer" in 2001, it wrote:

Mann recorded a combination of spontaneous and carefully arranged moments of childhood repose and revealingly — sometimes unnervingly — imaginative play. What the outraged critics of her child nudes failed to grant was the patent devotion involved throughout the project and the delighted complicity of her son and daughters in so many of the solemn or playful events. No other collection of family photographs is remotely like it, in both its naked candor and the fervor of its maternal curiosity and care.

Dr. Aaron Esman, a child psychiatrist at the Payne Whitney Clinic, believes that Mann is serious about her work and that she has "no intention to jeopardize her children or use them for pornographic images". He says that the nude photographs don't appear to be erotically stimulating to anyone but a "case-hardened pedophile or a rather dogmatic religious fundamentalist". Mann stated, "I didn't expect the controversy over the pictures of my children. I was just a mother photographing her children as they were growing up. I was exploring different subjects with them."

== Later career ==
Mann's fourth book, Still Time, published in 1994, was based on the catalogue of a traveling exhibition that included more than 20 years of her photography. The 60 images included more photographs of her children but also earlier landscapes with color and abstract photographs.

In the mid-1990s, Mann began photographing landscapes on wet plate collodion 8x10 inch glass negatives and used the same 100-year-old 8x10 format bellows view camera that she had used for all the previous bodies of work. These landscapes were first seen in Still Time, and later featured in two shows presented by the Edwynn Houk Gallery in NYC: Sally Mann – Mother Land: Recent Landscapes of Georgia and Virginia in 1997, and then in Deep South: Landscapes of Louisiana and Mississippi in 1999. Many of these large (40"x50") black-and-white and manipulated prints were taken using the 19th century "wet plate" process, or collodion, in which glass plates are coated with collodion, dipped in silver nitrate, and exposed while still wet. This gave the photographs what the New York Times called "a swirling, ethereal image with a center of preternatural clarity", and showed many flaws and artifacts, some from the process and some introduced by Mann.

Mann has been the subject of two film documentaries. The first, Blood Ties (1994), was directed by Steve Cantor and Peter Spirer. It debuted at the 1994 Sundance Film Festival and was nominated for an Academy Award for Best Documentary Short. The second, What Remains: The Life and Work of Sally Mann (2005), was also directed by Cantor. It premiered at the 2006 Sundance Film Festival and was nominated for an Emmy for Best Documentary in 2008. In her New York Times review of the film, Ginia Bellafante wrote, "It is one of the most exquisitely intimate portraits not only of an artist's process, but also of a marriage and a life, to appear on television in recent memory."

Mann uses antique view cameras from the early 1890s. These cameras have wooden frames, accordion-like bellows and long lenses made out of brass, now held together by tape that has mold growing inside. This sort of camera, when used with vintage lenses, softens the light. A self-portrait (which also included her two daughters) was featured on the September 9, 2001 cover of The New York Times Magazine, for a theme issue on "Women Looking at Women".

Mann's fifth book, What Remains, published in 2003, is based on the show of the same name at the Corcoran Gallery in Washington, DC. The book is broken up into four sections: Matter; Lent, December 8, 2000; Antietam; and What Remains. The first section contains photographs of the remains of Eva, her greyhound, after decomposition, along with photographs of dead and decomposing bodies at a federal forensic anthropology facility (known as the "body farm"). The "body farm" was another series (in addition to those about her family) that was controversial. The second part details the site on her property where an armed escaped convict was killed in a shootout with police. The third part is a study of the grounds of Antietam, the site of the bloodiest single day battle in American history during the Civil War. The fourth part is a study of close-up faces of her children.

Mann's sixth book, Deep South, published in 2005, with 65 black-and-white images, includes landscapes taken from 1992 to 2004 using both conventional 8x10 film and wet plate collodion. These photographs have been described as "haunted landscapes of the South, battlefields, decaying mansion, kudzu-shrouded landscapes, and the site where Emmett Till was murdered". Newsweek picked it as their book choice for the holiday season, saying that Mann "walks right up to every Southern stereotype in the book and subtly demolishes each in its turn by creating indelibly disturbing images that hover somewhere between document and dream".

Mann's seventh book, Proud Flesh, published in 2009, is a study taken over six years of the effects of muscular dystrophy on her husband Larry Mann. Mann photographed her husband using the collodion wet plate process. As she notes, "The results of this rare reversal of photographic roles are candid, extraordinarily wrenching, and touchingly frank portraits of a man at his most vulnerable moment." The project was displayed in Gagosian Gallery in October 2009.

Mann's eighth book, The Flesh and the Spirit, published in 2010, was released in conjunction with a comprehensive show at the Virginia Museum of Fine Arts in Richmond, Virginia. Regarding this exhibition, the museum director stated, "She follows her own voice. Her pictures are imbued with an amazing degree of soul." Though not strictly a retrospective, this 200-page book included new and recent work (unpublished self-portraits, landscapes, images of her husband, her children's faces, and of the dead at a forensic institute) as well as early works (unpublished color photographs of her children in the 1990s, color Polaroids, and platinum prints from the 1970s). Its unifying theme is the body, with its vagaries of illnesses and death. It includes essays by John Ravenal, David Levi Strauss, and Anne Wilkes Tucker.

In May 2011 Mann delivered the three-day Massey Lecture Series at Harvard, speaking about how her extended family influenced her work. Her memoir Hold Still arose as a companion to the lecture. In June 2011, Mann sat down with one of her contemporaries, Nan Goldin, at the Look3 Charlottesville Festival of the Photograph. The two photographers discussed their respective careers, particularly the ways in which photographing personal lives became a source of professional controversy. This was followed by an appearance at the University of Michigan as part of the Penny W. Stamps lecture series.

Mann's ninth book, Hold Still: A Memoir with Photographs, released May 12, 2015, is a melding of a memoir of her youth, an examination of some major influences of her life, and reflections on how photography shapes one's view of the world. It is augmented with numerous photographs, letters, and other memorabilia. She singles out her "near-feral" childhood and her subsequent introduction to photography at Putney, her relationship with her husband of 40 years and his parents' mysterious death, and her maternal Welsh relatives' nostalgia for land - the background to her own love for her land in the Shenandoah Valle - as some of her important influences.

She also assesses Gee-Gee, a black woman who was like a parent to her, who opened Mann's eyes to race relations and exploitation; her relationship with local artist Cy Twombly; and her father's genteel Southern legacy and his eventual death. She ponders the relationship Robert S. Munger, her great-grandfather and southern industrialist, had with his workers. The New York Times described it as "an instant classic among Southern memoirs of the last 50 years". An article by Mann adapted from this book appeared with photographs in The New York Times Magazine in April 2015. Hold Still was a finalist for the 2015 National Book Award.

Mann's tenth book, Remembered Light: Cy Twombly in Lexington, was published in 2016. It is an insider's photographic view of Twombly's studio in Lexington. It was published concurrently with an exhibit of color and black-and-white photographs at the Gagosian Gallery. It shows the overflow of Twombly's general modus operandi: the leftovers, smears, and stains, or as critic Simon Schama said in his essay at the start of the book, "an absence turned into a presence".

Mann's eleventh book, Sally Mann: A Thousand Crossings, written by Sarah Greenough and Sarah Kennel, is a large (320 pages) compendium of works spanning 40 years, with 230 photographs by Mann. It served as a catalog for an exhibit at the National Gallery of Art entitled Sally Mann: A Thousand Crossings, which opened March 4, 2018. This was the first major survey of the artist's work to travel internationally.

In her recent projects, Mann has started exploring the issues of race and the legacy of slavery that were a central theme of her memoir Hold Still. They include a series of portraits of black men, all made during one-hour sessions in the studio with models not previously known to her. Mann was inspired by Bill T. Jones's use of the Walt Whitman 1856 poem "Poem of the Body" in his artworks. She "borrowed the idea, using the poem as a template for [her] own exploration". Several pictures from this body of work were highlighted in Aperture Foundation magazine in the summer of 2016, and they also appeared in A Thousand Crossings.

The Crossings book and exhibit introduced a series of photographs of African-American historic churches photographed on expired film. Mann also published a series of tintype photographs of a swamp that had served as a refuge for escaped slaves. Some critics believe that she is working deeply through the legacy of white violence in the South, while others have voiced concern that Mann's work at times repeats rather than critiques tropes of white domination and violence in the region.

In 2025, Mann published her twelfth book, Art Work: On the Creative Life.

== Diaries of Home ==
In 2024, a group exhibition at the Modern Art Museum of Fort Worth, Diaries of Home, raised controversy from local elected officials. The exhibition "features works by women and nonbinary artists, who explore the multilayered concepts of family, community, and home." Mann's work focuses on family portraits, which include images of her children in the nude. While the museum described this as "intimate and compelling," locals have complained of "child pornography" to the Dallas Express. Efforts to remove Mann's "Immediate Family" series from museum was led by the Danbury Institute, a conservative Christian advocacy group.

Supporters of the exhibit have argued that this outcry "reflects a broader escalating trend of censorship targeting artists and institutions whose work challenges societal norms or explores sensitive topics."

== Personal life ==
Mann, born and raised in Virginia, is the daughter of Robert Munger and Elizabeth Munger. In Mann's introduction for her book Immediate Family, she "expresses stronger memories for the black woman, Virginia (Gee-Gee) Carter, who oversaw her upbringing, than for her own mother". Elizabeth Munger was not a big part of Mann's life, and Elizabeth said "Sally may look like me, but inside she's her father's child." Virginia Carter, born in 1894, raised Mann and her two brothers and was an admirable woman. "Left with six children and a public education system for which she paid taxes but which forbade classes for black children beyond the seventh grade, Gee-Gee managed somehow to send each of them to out-of-state boarding schools and, ultimately, to college." Virginia Carter died in 1994.

In 1969 Sally met Larry Mann, and in 1970 they married. Larry Mann is an attorney. Before practicing law, he was a blacksmith. Around 1996 Larry was diagnosed with muscular dystrophy. The couple live together in their home which they built on Sally's family's farm in Lexington, Virginia. They have three children together. Emmett (born 1979) served for a time in the Peace Corps. He died by suicide in 2016 after battling schizophrenia following a life-threatening car collision. Jessie (born 1981) became an artist. Virginia (born 1985) became a lawyer.

Mann is passionate about endurance horse racing. In 2006, her Arabian horse ruptured an aneurysm while she was riding him. In the horse's death throes, Mann was thrown to the ground, the horse rolled over her, and the impact broke her back. It took her two years to recover from the accident. During this time, she made a series of ambrotype self-portraits. These self-portraits were on view for the first time in November 2010 at the Virginia Museum of Fine Arts as a part of Sally Mann: the Flesh and the Spirit.

She was a guest on BBC Radio 4's Desert Island Discs on January 4, 2026.

== Publications ==
=== Books ===
- Second Sight: The Photographs of Sally Mann. David R. Godine, Boston 1983. ISBN 978-0-87923-471-3. Introduction by Jane Livingston.
- At Twelve: Portraits of Young Women. Aperture, New York 1988. ISBN 978-0-89381-296-6.
- Immediate Family. Aperture, New York 1992. ISBN 978-0-89381-518-9.
- Still Time. Aperture, New York 1994. ISBN 978-0-89381-593-6.
- What Remains. Bulfinch, Boston 2003. ISBN 978-0-8212-2843-2.
- Deep South. Bulfinch, Boston 2005. ISBN 978-0-8212-2876-0.
- Sally Mann. 21st Editions, South Dennis, MA, 2005. Portfolio, edition of 110.
- Southern Landscape. 21st Editions, South Dennis, MA, 2013. Portfolio, edition of 58.
- Hold Still: A Memoir with Photographs. Little, Brown, New York 2015. ISBN 978-0-316-24776-4.
- Remembered Light: Cy Twombly in Lexington. Abrams. 2016. ISBN 978-1-4197-2272-1.
- Sally Mann: A Thousand Crossings. Abrams. 2018. ISBN 978-1419729034.
- Art Work. Harry N. Abrams. 2025. p. 272. ISBN 978-1419780714.

=== Exhibition catalogues ===
- The Lewis Law Portfolio, Corcoran Gallery of Art, Washington DC, 1977
- Sweet Silent Thought, North Carolina Center for Creative Photography, Durham, NC, 1987
- Still Time, Alleghany Highland Arts and Crafts Center, Clifton Forge, VA, 1988
- Mother Land, Edwynn Houk Gallery, New York, 1997
- Sally Mann, Gagosian Gallery, New York, 2006
- Sally Mann: Deep South/Battlefields, Kulturhuset, Stockholm, Sweden, 2007
- Sally Mann: Proud Flesh. Gagosian Gallery/Aperture, New York 2009. ISBN 978-1-59711-135-5.
- John B. Ravenal; David Levi Strauss; Sally Mann; Anne Wilkes Tucker (2010). Sally Mann: The Flesh and the Spirit. Richmond/New York: Virginia Museum of Fine Arts/Aperture. ISBN 978-1-59711-162-1.

=== Publications with contributions by Mann ===
- Melissa Harris, ed. (1990). "The Body in Question". Aperture. No. 121. Aperture Foundation. ISBN 978-0-89381-447-2.
- Charles S. Taylor, ed. (1992). "A Special Issue on Parents". Mad River - A Journal of Essays. No. 4. Dayton: Wright State University.
- Michael E. Hoffman, ed. (1996). "Everything That Lives, Eats". Aperture. No. 145. Aperture Foundation. ISBN 978-0-89381-686-5.
- Corcoran Gallery of Art; National Hospice Foundation, eds. (1996). Hospice: A Photographic Inquiry. Bulfinch. ISBN 978-0-8212-2260-7. Touring exhibition, Corcoran Gallery of Art et al.
- The Nature Conservancy, ed. (2001). "Sally Mann: Calakmul Biosphere Reserve, Mexico". In Response to Place: William Christenberry, Lynn Davis ... Photographs from the Nature Conservancy's Last Green Places. pp. 124–135. ISBN 978-0-8212-2741-1. Touring exhibition, Corcoran Gallery of Art et al.
- Melissa Harris (2001). Michael E. Hoffman (ed.). "Jessie Mann on Being Photographed". Aperture. No. 162. Aperture Foundation. ISBN 978-0-89381-925-5.
- Ferdinand Protzman, Landscape: Photographs of Time and Place. National Geographic, 2003. ISBN 978-0-7922-6166-7.
- R. H. Cravens, ed. (2005). Photography Past/Forward: Aperture at 50. New York: Aperture Foundation. ISBN 978-1-931788-37-3.
- Forrest Gander (2005). Eye Against Eye. New York: New Directions. ISBN 978-0-81121635-7.

=== Biographies ===
- John Wood (2004). Sally Mann. 21st Editions, Incorporated. ISBN 978-1-892733-27-6.

=== Further reading ===
- Harrison Adams, Intimacy, Photography, Shame: 1969-1992, 135-158. London: Routledge, 2024.
- Anne Higgonet, Pictures of Innocence: History and Crisis of Ideal Childhood. London: Thames & Hudson, 1998.
- Janet Malcolm, Diana & Nikon: Essays on Photography (Expanded Edition). New York: Aperture, 1997.
- Jonathan Weinberg, Ambition and Love in Modern American Art. New Haven: Yale University Press, 2001.

== Film and television ==
- Blood Ties: The Life and Work of Sally Mann. Directed by Steven Cantor and Peter Spirer. Moving Target Productions. 30 minutes, color, DVD. Nomination for an Academy Award for Best Documentary: Short Subject (1992)
- "Giving Up the Ghost". Egg, The Arts Show. Produced by Mary Recine for Thirteen/WNET, New York. (2002)
- "Place". Episode One. Art 21- Directed by Catherine Tatge, Art in the Twenty-First Century for PBS Broadcasting, Virginia. 14 minutes. Color. DVD. (2002)
- What Remains: The Life and Work of Sally Mann. Directed by Steven Cantor. Zeitgeist Films, New York. 80 minutes, color, DVD. (2004). Winner of Best Documentary. Jacksonville Film Festival. Won Grand Jury Prize for Best Documentary Film. Nantucket Film Festival Won Best Storytelling in Documentary Film. Nantucket Film Festival Official Selection. Sundance Film Festival New York Loves Film Documentary Award. Tribeca Film Festival. (2006)
- "Some Things Are Private". Playwrights Deborah Salem Smith, Laura Kepley. Trinity Repertory Theatre, Dowling Theater. Providence, RI. (2008)
- "The Genius of Photography: We Are Family". Episode 6. BBC Four Productions, Wall to Wall Media Ltd. (2008)
- "Thalia Book Club: Sally Mann Hold Still". Ann Patchett, Symphony Space (May 13, 2015)

== Awards ==
- 2001: Time magazine named Mann "America's Best Photographer"
- 2006: Honorary Doctor of Fine Arts degree from the Corcoran College of Art + Design.
- 2012: Honorary Fellowship of the Royal Photographic Society (UK)
- 2016: Andrew Carnegie Medal for Excellence in Nonfiction for Hold Still: A Memoir in Photographs.
- 2020: Centenary Medal, Royal Photographic Society, Bristol, UK
- 2021: Inducted into the International Photography Hall of Fame on October 29, 2021
- 2021: Prix Pictet's ninth global photography award
- 2025: Lifetime Achievement Award for CCP (Center for Photography at Woodstock)'s Vision Awards.

== Collections ==
Mann's work is held in the following permanent collections:

- Metropolitan Museum of Art
- National Gallery of Art
- Hirshhorn Museum and Sculpture Garden
- Museum of Fine Arts, Boston
- San Francisco Museum of Modern Art
- Whitney Museum, New York City: 12 prints (as of October 2020)
