= What Remains (book) =

2003 photography book by Sally Mann

- Cover
- Author: Sally Mann
- Language: English
- Genre: Photography
- Publisher: Bullfinch Press
- Publication date: 2003
- Pages: 132
- ISBN: 978-0821228432
- Preceded by: Still Time
- Followed by: Deep South

What Remains is a 2003 photography book by Sally Mann. The book is published by Bullfinch Press and contains 132 images on the subject of death, including photographs of decomposing bodies. The book lent its name to the 2005 film about Sally Mann, What Remains: The Life and Work of Sally Mann, in which Mann can be seen at the University of Tennessee's anthropological facility, taking photos for the book of corpses which had specifically been left outside for scientific study of human decomposition. Mann opened her exhibition for the book at the Corcoran College of Art and Design in 2004. The exhibition was divided into five sections that "visually depict[ed] the eternal cycle of life, death, and regeneration."

Mann was inspired to produce the photographs in the book by her reactions to several different events. The first of these was the death of her father; later events that inspired her interest in death were the shooting of a prison escapee on the grounds of her Lexington, Virginia, farm and the death of her pet greyhound, Eva. Mann arranged for Eva's skin to be preserved by tanning and buried her body in a cage in order to prevent the remains from being carried off by wild animals. She later dug up the cage and photographed the dog's skeletal remains. A series of photos documenting Eva's decomposition is included in the book.

Despite the fact that some critics found the images off-putting, Mann expressed surprise that the book did not garner the controversy of her previous books which featured nude photos of her young children. While giving the book a favourable review, Blake Morrison expressed his surprise that no one had questioned her right to publish photographs of the dead when there had been extensive protests over her images of her children.

If there's any time when you're vulnerable, it's when you're dead. In life, those people had pride and privacy. I felt sorry for them. I thought if they knew I was taking photos, without them having a chance to comb their hair or put their teeth in, they'd die of shame. So I expected critics to ask: is this right?

— Sally Mann

Richard Lacayo from Time also spoke highly of the images in the book. Mann stated that she was under the impression that all of the people in the photos had signed release forms for photographs to be taken. Later, however, she learned that some of the corpses were of street people who had no opportunity to sign consent forms. After her experiences taking photos for the book Mann decided to arrange for her own body to be donated to science after her death.
