= Immediate Family (book) =

1992 photography book

- Cover
- Author: Sally Mann
- Language: English
- Genre: Photography
- Publisher: Aperture
- Publication date: 1992
- Pages: 78
- ISBN: 978-0-89381-518-9
- Preceded by: At Twelve: Portraits of Young Women
- Followed by: Still Time

Immediate Family is a 1992 photography book by Sally Mann. Images from the book were first exhibited in 1990 by Edwynn Houk Gallery in New York City. The book is published by Aperture and contains 65 duotone images. The book predominantly features Mann's three children, Emmett, Jessie and Virginia, when all were under 10 years old. Thirteen of the pictures show nudity, and three show minor injuries: Emmett with a nosebleed, Jessie with a cut and stitches, and Jessie with a swollen eye from an insect bite. Many explore typical childhood activities at the family's remote summer cabin along the Maury River (skinny dipping, reading the funnies, dressing up, vamping, napping, playing board games) but others touch on darker themes such as insecurity, loneliness, injury, sexuality and death. Several images from the book were re-published in Mann's next book, Still Time.

Mann stated, "I didn't expect the controversy over the pictures of my children. I was just a mother photographing her children as they were growing up. I was exploring different subjects with them."

Dr. Aaron Esman, a child psychiatrist at the Payne Whitney Clinic, believes that Mann is serious about her work and that she has "no intention to jeopardize her children or use them for pornographic images". He says that the nude photographs don't appear to be erotically stimulating to anyone but a "case-hardened pedophile or a rather dogmatic religious fundamentalist".

== Production ==
The images within the book were taken between 1984 and 1991 in rural Virginia, where the children, and Mann herself, spent their childhoods. Photographs were taken with an 8 x 10 view camera. Mann originally decided not to publish the book until 10 years after the last photos had been taken, as her children would be older and more likely to understand the images. When Emmett and Jessie found out they protested, insisting that she publish it sooner. The children held the power to refuse any images being published. Virginia refused to let a photo of her urinating appear in the book, and Emmet refused to allow a photo with him with his socks on his hands. Sally Mann commented her children seemed only concerned over being portrayed as "geeks" and showed no concern over nudity.

== Reception ==
In a cover story for The New York Times Magazine, Richard B. Woodward wrote that "Probably no photographer in history has enjoyed such a burst of success in the art world". By September 1992, 300 prints from the book had already been ordered, earning "well over a half-million dollars".

The book was met with "great acclaim and discomfort". Critical review varied from praising the book as "timeless and magic," to chastising it as "pornographic and exploitative." Blake Morrison commented that Immediate Family made Mann famous for the wrong reasons; "because critics exaggerated the intimacy of the photos at the expense of their artfulness; and because the American religious right accused her of pornography when her camera was capturing beauty and transience."

"Out of the 65 photos in the book, only 13 show the children naked. There was no internet in those days. I'd never seen child pornography. It wasn't in people's consciousness. Showing my children's bodies didn't seem unusual to me. Exploitation was the farthest thing from my mind."

— Sally Mann

Lucy Sante (formerly Luc Sante) in The New Republic considered Immediate Family "one of the great photograph books of our time".

When Time magazine named Mann "America's Best Photographer" in 2001, it wrote:

Mann recorded a combination of spontaneous and carefully arranged moments of childhood repose and revealingly — sometimes unnervingly — imaginative play. What the outraged critics of her child nudes failed to grant was the patent devotion involved throughout the project and the delighted complicity of her son and daughters in so many of the solemn or playful events. No other collection of family photographs is remotely like it, in both its naked candor and the fervor of its maternal curiosity and care.

=== Making the private public ===
Deborah Chambers, in her work on family photo albums, reflects on their idyllic nature but also argues they rarely convey the actual experience of the family. Mann's work takes these idyllic photos meant for semi-private consumption and brings them to the public sphere. By working collaboratively with her children Mann uses these idealised family photos to create a narrative from her children's perspectives.

Critics agreed, saying her "vision in large measure [is] accurate, and a welcome corrective to familiar notions of youth as a time of unalloyed sweetness and innocence", and that the book "created a place that looked like Eden, then cast upon it the subdued and shifting light of nostalgia, sexuality and death".

Sarah Parsons reflects on the challenges in categorising Mann's work, arguing it is neither "portraiture, nor documentary, or snapshot". Instead, Parsons argues the power of Mann's work is in the tension between private family life and the showing of that private life in the public sphere. She argues when these private moments are placed in the public eye, they are interpreted through societal codes such as, motherhood; allowing the viewer to interpret the narrative of the work through their subjective views. Additionally, Ann Beattie argues "...a pose is only a pose..." reinforcing the opinion that the controversy stems from adult's subjective interpretation of the narrative that pose creates.

== Controversy ==
Immediate Family appeared at a time politicians were cracking down on even the suspicion of child pornography to appeal to their constituents. Negative accountability forced suspected artists to justify their work, leading many to self-censor or have their work removed from public spaces. Jeff Ferrell described this as "cultural criminalisation", as the media manipulated public conceptions of cultural works, delegitimizing artists like Mann, despite legal actions never being having brought against her. According to writer Bruce Handy, the Christian right conflated naturalistic nudes of children by Mann and Jock Sturges with sexualized images by photographers such as David Hamilton. Spurred on by activists such as Randall Terry, an Alabama grand jury indicted Barnes & Noble for selling child pornography. The indictment was dismissed after it was determined the books did not violate state law.

Joan Kee argues artists such as Mann and Jacqueline Livingston were under heightened scrutiny due to photography being linked with law and evidence, the passage of child pornography regulations, and feminists such as Andrea Dworkin and Catharine A. MacKinnon arguing for the censorship of any nude female photography. However, academics such as Connie Samaras criticized complaints from feminist groups, like Women Against Pornography (WAP), about Mann's work arguing "nakedness, even if it suggests lawlessness... has central meaning to many people's lives for a wide variety of legitimate reasons."

Novelist Mary Gordon argued that the sexual nature of Mann's work invites discussion of her children's sexuality; harmfully bringing part of the private sphere of the nucleus family into the public eye. An example she cites is a photo entitled The Perfect Tomato, in which the viewer sees a nude Jessie, posing on a picnic table outside, bathed in light. Mary Gordon argues "tomato" is slang to describe a desirable woman, the title, consequently, furthering the sexual themes and presenting her daughter as "sexually desirable". Jessie told Steven Cantor during the filming of his documentary Blood Ties that she had just been playing around and her mother told her to freeze, and she tried to capture the image in a rush because the sun was setting. This explains why everything is blurred except for a tomato on the table, hence the photograph's title. Mann responded to Gordon by stating that any sexual connotations came from the viewer, not the images.

The most negative criticism came from Raymond Sokolov, who questioned whether children should be photographed nude and whether federal funds should be appropriated for such artworks. Accompanying his article one of the images by Mann of her daughter Virginia (Virginia at 4), in which her eyes, nipples, and pubic region were covered by black bars. Mann said he used the image without permission "to illustrate that this is the kind of thing that shouldn't be shown". Mann said that after Virginia saw the article, she started touching herself on the areas that were blacked out, saying, "what's wrong with me?" Mann responded to the criticisms saying she did not plan the photographs and that when she was young, she was often nude, so she raised her children similarly.

Mann was never charged with the taking or selling of child pornography, though according to Edward de Grazia, law professor and civil liberties expert, "any federal prosecutor anywhere in the country could bring a case against [Mann] in Virginia, and not only seize her photos, her equipment, her Rolodexes, but also seize her children for psychiatric and physical examination". Before she published Immediate Family, she consulted a Virginia federal prosecutor who told her that some of the images she was exhibiting could have her arrested. In 1991, she decided to postpone the publication of the book. In an interview with New York Times reporter, Richard Woodward, she said "I thought the book could wait 10 years, when the kids won't be living in the same bodies. They'll have matured and they'll understand the implications of the pictures. I unilaterally decided." However, when her children found out about the decision, they succeeded in changing their mother's mind. However, to protect the children from "teasing", Mann told Woodward that she wanted to keep copies of Immediate Family out of their home town of Lexington. She asked bookstores in the area not to sell it and for libraries to keep it in their rare-book rooms.

In 1993 Steven Cantor directed the film Blood Ties: The Life and Work of Sally Mann, which focused largely on Mann's defending herself from allegations by the Christian right.
