= At Twelve: Portraits of Young Women =

Sally Mann photography

- Cover
- Author: Sally Mann
- Language: English
- Genre: Photography
- Publisher: Aperture
- Publication date: 1988
- Pages: 56
- ISBN: 978-0-89381-330-7
- Preceded by: Second Sight: The Photographs of Sally Mann
- Followed by: Immediate Family

At Twelve: Portraits of Young Women is a 1988 photography book by Sally Mann. The book is published by Aperture and contains 37 duotone images of 12-year-old girls. The girls are the children of friends and relatives of Mann in her home state Virginia. Unlike Mann's later work, the images within the book do not feature nudity. The book is dedicated to Mann's husband, Larry.

== Reception ==
The Museum of Contemporary Photography stated the book "capture[s] the confusing emotions and developing identities of adolescent girls," particularly praising an image entitled 'Candy Cigarette'.

Candy Cigarette is a striking example of Mann's distinctive combination of careful planning and serendipity. In this work Mann's daughter, Jessie, suspends her activity and gracefully balances a c cigarette in her hand, appearing to be the innocent miniature of a blonde and gangling twenty-something beauty. Mann’s expressive printing style lends a dramatic and brooding mood to all of her images.

— Museum of Contemporary Photography

Andy Grundberg from The New York Times gave a favourable review, stating "Ms. Mann is at her best when she concentrates on flesh and blood. Her picture of a girl in a tank top, taken over the subject's shoulder from behind so that all we see is the curve of her shoulder melding with the shape of her breast, shows how powerful simplicity can be."

The subject of the images within the book created a minor controversy; however, Mann's work was only protested following the release of her next book, Immediate Family.
