= The Afterlife Experiments =

Book written by Gary Schwartz and William L. Simon

The Afterlife Experiments: Breakthrough Scientific Evidence of Life After Death
- Author: Gary Schwartz; William L. Simon
- Language: English
- Subjects: Parapsychology; Mediumship; Paranormal
- Publisher: Atria Books
- Publication date: March 18, 2003
- Publication place: United States
- Media type: Print (paperback)
- Pages: 400
- ISBN: 9780743436595
- OCLC: 4363432101

The Afterlife Experiments: Breakthrough Scientific Evidence of Life After Death is a book written by Gary Schwartz and bestselling author William L. Simon, with a foreword by Deepak Chopra. The book, published in 2003, reviews several experiments which aimed to investigate the possibility of life after death through the use of psychic mediums. Included in these experiments is one filmed and aired as part of an HBO special. Two studies stemming from the experiments were also published in the Journal of the Society for Psychical Research. The substance of the book and the studies it describes was generally claimed by the media as scientific evidence of life after death. However, there was significant criticism from the scientific community of the studies, their methodologies, and resulting data analyses.

== About the authors ==
Gary Schwartz, Ph.D., received his initial doctorate from Harvard University. Thereafter, he became a member of the psychology and psychiatry departments at Yale University. As of 2023, Schwartz was a professor of Psychology, Medicine, Neurology, Psychiatry, and Surgery at the University of Arizona. William L. Simon received two degrees from Cornell University. He has written several New York Times bestselling books, and is also a noted screenwriter.

== Synopsis ==
The book contains reports detailing a series of experiments in which mediums attempted to provide clients (“sitters”) with unique information that they allegedly gleaned from contact with the sitters' deceased relatives and friends. A series of experiments were conducted over time, with several different methodologies implemented with each successive experiment. The resulting data and analyses of these experiments are discussed in varying levels of detail. Only partial data sets from many of the experiments are included in the book. The controversial conclusion drawn from the studies is that there is good evidence that consciousness persists after death.

== Initial experiments ==
The first experiments described in the book involved two mediums. The first, Susy Smith, was tasked with “contacting” four deceased persons and drawing a picture that each of the deceased individuals allegedly suggested. She also drew a fifth control picture, and put all five in a sealed envelope. Thereafter, the second medium, Laurie Campbell, whom Susy Smith had never met, attempted to contact the same deceased persons and took notes. Thereafter, Laurie and three others (including Gary Schwartz) were brought together and videotaped in an attempt to correlate drawings with deceased persons. Susy Smith was also present with this panel during this time.

In the first evaluation, the four judges tried to determine which deceased individual correlated with each of Susy’s drawings. The four judges averaged 20% accuracy in this task. In a second evaluation, though, all four judges associated all five descriptions (including the control) with the correct image. No details are provided as to the precise design of this experiment, and if Susy was able to communicate with the judges.

== The HBO experiments ==
Approximately one year later, the second series of experiments were conducted, and were the subject of an HBO documentary special. It consisted of five mediums: John Edward, Suzane Northrop, Laurie Campbell, George Anderson, and Anne Gehman. Mediums and sitters, who had never previously met, sat with partial partitions between them. Cameras were set up to independently film the medium and sitter. Readings for the two sitters were performed in succession. One sitter was recruited by HBO, and known to have lost six loved ones in the previous ten years. The other was recruited by Schwartz’s team, and their identity kept secret from the HBO team and the mediums. Mediums attempted to contact deceased acquaintances of the two sitters in their usual manner, asking questions of the sitters, who were only allowed to answer questions “yes” or “no”. Little to no controls were placed on the environment during the readings. This potentially allowed mediums to pick up on verbal and non-verbal cues of the sitters despite the thin screen. Context clues determined by a psychic through a sitter’s voice (and other characteristics) are often an essential tool in a psychic cold reading. All five mediums performed a reading for the first sitter, but due to time and filming limitations, only two mediums performed readings for the second sitter.

The sitters themselves were prompted to rate the correctness of all of the statements made by the mediums twice. Once immediately after the readings, and a second time a few months later. The two sitters judged the mediums with the highest degree of correctness on 83% and 77% of their statements, respectively. The ratings taken months after the experiments were considered the primary data set, although no explanation is given as to why. The initial ratings were never included in Schwartz's study.

In an attempt to establish a control for these results, 68 undergraduate students were later presented with the statements, which were rephrased as questions, along with a picture of each sitter. They were asked to guess the answer to the questions as they pertain to each sitter. They were correct 36% of the time. This data was used as a baseline for the odds of mediums randomly guessing correct statements. However, the undergraduate students are demographically different from the mediums, and have no mediumship experience.

== The Miraval experiments ==
In the next series of experiments, a sitter received readings from two of the original mediums, with the sitter now located six feet behind the medium. The first phase of these experiments implemented the “silent-sitter” method, in which the sitters are expected to remain completely silent. The intent of this is to minimize the mediums receiving any verbal and non-verbal cues about the sitter. During the next phase, the sitter was instructed to answer only “yes” or “no” to the medium’s questions.

As in the previous experiments, the sitter themself was tasked to rate the correctness of the statements made by the medium. The sitter rated 82% of the statements as being “definitely correct.” Schwartz notes that the original plan was to include ten sitters in these experiments, but data for only one sitter is included in the published study. The other nine are excluded from the study, but some of this additional data is included anecdotally in the book. No explanation is given for this.

== The Canyon Ranch experiments ==
In this next set of experiments, the following protocols were implemented:

- Sitters wrote down details of their lives in advance, including relationships with deceased people they were hoping to hear from during the readings. These details were sealed and not revealed to experimenters until later
- Sitters were isolated in a separate room in between readings
- The walls of the screening room were covered with white sheets, with a screen placed to separate sitters and mediums
- The silent-sitter method was utilized at first
- The mediums worked with the same experimenter throughout
- The second round utilized a “yes/no” question phase. But this time, the experimenter relayed the responses to "yes/no" questions instead of the sitter directly responding “yes/no”
- Instead of each sitter rating the accuracy of statements from their own readings only, all four participating sitters rated the accuracy of all statements

Schwartz notes that sitters rated the accuracy of the statements made by the mediums during these experiments, as in the previous experiments. The data from these experiments are not detailed in the book. Instead, he includes a list of alleged hits by John Edward that he describes as “dazzle shots.”

== Reception and analyses ==
There was initial positive reception upon release of the book and the results it detailed, primarily from the mediumship community and the media at large. Some noted the application of the scientific method to the unique subject of life after death. Others praised the experiments detailed in the book for their precision, detail, and the compelling nature of the results as presented. The accuracy rate of the mediums was often cited as 85% and above.

Widespread critiques of Schwartz’s experimental methodology and analysis of results were noted in several subsequently published articles by, among others, Ray Hyman, Richard Wiseman, and James Randi. Prior to the conduction of the studies, the James Randi Educational Foundation (JREF) suggested a sufficiently rigorous experimental design to Schwartz that was believed would result in scientifically sound results. Schwartz did not utilize these designs in his experiments. In general, it was thought that the opportunity for mediums to implement cold reading techniques was ubiquitous, despite the design of the studies.

More specifically, criticisms included:

- Judging bias: Statements made by mediums generally vary in specificity and subjectivity, and are then judged subjectively by the sitters to be accurate or not. Sitters may be motivated to confirm the accuracy of ambiguous statements made by mediums, out of desire to connect with deceased friends and family. Some of the sitters also knew a relatively large number of deceased people, which can also increase the probability that statements made by mediums apply to one of those deceased individuals.
- Control group design and bias: The group of undergraduate students was used as a control group to test the validity of statements from mediums. However, the task charged to the control group was fundamentally different from the sitters, as the medium’s statements were reconfigured as questions, which the students were then asked to answer after seeing an image of the sitter. The task framed in this way significantly reduces the probability of making a hit. Therefore, conclusions drawn from the control group results are skewed and misleading, and cannot provide a baseline for comparison against guessing.
- Sensory leakage: Any experiment where the sitter responds “yes” or “no” in their own voice could result in sensory leakage. Characteristics of the sitters (age, gender, mood, etc.) can potentially be gleaned by the mediums from a direct vocal response. Information can then be deduced from these perceived characteristics, as would be in the case in a cold reading. This information could prompt the mediums to give statements that are statistically more likely to be true for the sitters.
- Inadequate blinding: The experimenters, whose role it was to relay information between the sitter and medium, was cited as a large potential for introducing bias into the results. In some cases of the earlier cited experiments, the experimenters were aware of personal history of the sitters. The experiments were critiqued in that true double-blinding was only reached in the final cited experiment.
- Failure to fact check: The sitters could be subject to misremembering simple facts out of an enthusiasm to reconnect with deceased loved ones, or even motivated to intentionally lie. Schwartz’s methodology was critiqued for not fact-checking the statements that sitters claimed were true about themselves. Many of these facts would be straightforward to independently fact check, yet this verification was not done.

=== Author response ===
Gary Schwartz actively responded to many of the criticisms leveled against his experiments, most notably in a published article in Skeptical Inquirer. In that article, he refutes many of the critiques of his experimental methodologies and conclusions, particularly those made by professor Ray Hyman in his prior Skeptical Inquirer article. In the article, Schwartz also criticizes Skeptical Inquirer magazine for inadequate fact-checking. Ray Hyman published a short response to this in Skeptical Inquirer, and addressed some of the points that Schwartz makes in his response.
