= Marc H. Simon =

American filmmaker and entertainment attorney

Marc H. Simon is an American filmmaker and entertainment attorney.

He created, wrote and produced After Innocence, which won the special jury award at the 2005 Sundance Film Festival, before going on to receive other recognition, including its selection as a semi-finalist for Best Feature Documentary at the 78th Academy Awards. Nursery University (2008) marked Simon's feature directorial debut. The film premiered at Toronto's Hot Docs Film Festival. The documentary Unraveled (2011) was Simon's second directing effort and third as a producer. The film centers around prominent lawyer Marc Dreier, who was arrested for orchestrating a massive fraud scheme that netted hundreds of millions of dollars from hedge funds.

Simon also served as lead legal counsel for films such as Winter's Bone, The Kids Are All Right, Werner Herzog's Cave of Forgotten Dreams and Money. As of June 2020, Simon has been named Chair of an American law firm Fox Rothschild's Entertainment Law Department.

Simon is a graduate of Cardozo Law School and the University of Pennsylvania.
