= When Claude Got Shot =

- Directed by: Brad Lichtenstein
- Produced by: Brad Lichtenstein; Jamie Schutz; Steven Cantor; Santana Coleman (co-producer)
- Starring: Claude Motley
- Cinematography: Colin Sytsma
- Edited by: Michelle Chang
- Music by: Vernon Reid
- Production companies: Independent Lens; ITVS; Black Public Media; Snoopadelic Pictures; Stick Figure Productions; JustFilms/FordFoundation; 371 Productions
- Release date: March 17, 2021 (SXSW)
- Running time: 96 minutes
- Country: United States
- Language: English

When Claude Got Shot is a 2021 American documentary film, directed and produced by Brad Lichtenstein. Snoop Dogg serves as an executive producer under his Snoopadelic Pictures banner. The film follows Claude Motley, who returns to his hometown for a high school reunion only to be a victim of gun violence.

The film had its world premiere at South by Southwest on March 17, 2021.

== Synopsis ==
The film follows Claude Motley, who returns to his hometown for a high school reunion, only to be a victim of gun violence. Two days later, his assailant goes after a woman, Victoria Davison, who shoots him during the struggle, and feels guilty upon the discovery the assailant is paralyzed from the waist down. In a single weekend, three families’ lives are changed by gun violence.

== Release ==
The film had its world premiere at South by Southwest on March 17, 2021.
