= Spirit Game =

Spirit Game: Pride of a Nation
- Directed by: Peter Spirer and Peter Baxter
- Release date: 2017
- Running time: 102 minutes
- Country: United States
- Language: English

Spirit Game: Pride of a Nation is a 2017 documentary directed by Peter Spirer and Peter Baxter.
