= Citizen Ashe =

2021 film by Rex Miller and Sam Pollard

- Promotional release poster
- Directed by: Rex Miller; Sam Pollard
- Produced by: Rex Miller; Steven Cantor; Anna Godas; Jamie Schultz; Beth Hubbard; Jeanne Moutoussamy-Ashe
- Edited by: Lewis Rapkin; R.A. Fedde; Federico Rosenzvit; Ben Sozanski
- Music by: Jongnic Bontemps
- Production companies: CNN Films; Dogwoof; Stick Figure Productions; Rexpix; Get Lifted Film Company; Artemis Rising
- Distributed by: Magnolia Pictures; HBO Max
- Release dates: September 3, 2021 (Telluride); December 3, 2021 (United States)
- Running time: 95 minutes
- Countries: United States; United Kingdom
- Language: English

Citizen Ashe is a 2021 documentary film directed by Rex Miller and Sam Pollard revolving around the life and career of Arthur Ashe. Alex Gibney and John Legend were two of the executive producers.

Its world premiere at the Telluride Film Festival on September 3, 2021, was followed by a limited release by Magnolia Pictures on December 3, 2021.

== Synopsis ==
Citizen Ashe tells the story of tennis champion and civil rights activist Arthur Ashe, as he rises to prominence after becoming the first African American to win the US Open in 1968. The assassinations of Martin Luther King Jr. and Robert F. Kennedy jumpstart Ashe's political activism and provide him with a platform for social change. Jeanne Moutoussamy-Ashe, Johnnie Ashe, Billie Jean King, John McEnroe, Donald Dell, Lenny Simpson and Harry Edwards appear in the film.

== Production ==
In July 2021, it was announced that Miller and Pollard had directed a film revolving around the life of Ashe, with CNN Films producing and HBO Max distributing.

== Release ==
Citizen Ashe had its world premiere at the Telluride Film Festival on September 3, 2021. It also screened at the Camden International Film Festival on September 19, 2021. It received a limited release on December 3, 2021, by Magnolia Pictures.

== Reception ==
On the review aggregator website Rotten Tomatoes, 97% of 32 critics' reviews are positive, with an average rating of 7.6/10. The website's consensus reads: "If Citizen Ashe sometimes wavers toward hagiography, this warm tribute to an extraordinary life makes it easy to understand why." Metacritic, which uses a weighted average, assigned the film a score of 74 out of 100, based on 10 critics, indicating "generally favorable" reviews.

== Awards ==
Year	Award	Notes
2022	FOCAL International Awards	Nominee - Best Use of Footage in a Cinematic Feature Nominee - Best Use of Footage in a Sports Production
2022	Black Reel Awards	Nominee - Outstanding Documentary
