= Building Bombs =

1989 film

- Film poster
- Directed by: Mark Mori; Susan J. Robinson
- Produced by: Mark Mori; Susan J. Robinson
- Narrated by: Jane Alexander
- Distributed by: Video Project
- Release dates: September 9, 1989 (Atlanta Film and Video Festival)
- Running time: 54 minutes
- Country: United States
- Language: English

Building Bombs is a 1989 American documentary film produced and directed by Mark Mori and Susan J. Robinson.

== Summary ==
Building Bombs revisits the "glory days" of the atomic age, its legacy of nuclear weapons waste, and its troubling questions still unanswered. Insider stories and rare archival footage reveal the inner workings of one of the world’s largest nuclear bomb plants and its toll on the environment and human hearts. The film focused on environmental contamination and radiation safety issues at the Savannah River Site, located near Aiken, South Carolina in the United States.

Of historical interest, the film sparked a movement by ordinary people and rock stars, and contributed to a change in U.S. national policy regarding which federal government department exercised oversight of workers' and surrounding communities' health through health studies.

== PBS ==
In 1993, Building Bombs: The Legacy was released on PBS' POV. This edited version was 10 minutes shorter than the original film. Segments removed covered reasons for the nuclear buildup that were a subtext in the original release.

== Accolades ==
It was nominated for an Academy Award for Best Documentary Feature. The film was restored by the Academy Film Archive in 2024.
