= The Afterlife with Suzane Northrop =

Television series

- Genre: documentary
- Starring: Suzane Northrop; David Millbern (host)
- Country of origin: Canada
- Original language: English
- No. of seasons: 1
- No. of episodes: 8

Production
- Production locations: Vancouver, British Columbia
- Running time: 30 minutes

Original release
- Network: OutTV
- Release: September 14, 2008

The Afterlife with Suzane Northrop (often referred to as The Afterlife) is a Canadian English language documentary television series, which premiered on September 14, 2008 at 7:00 p.m. EST on the Canadian digital cable specialty channel, OutTV.

== Premise ==
Each episode, medium Suzane Northrop along with host David Millbern, holds séances in an intimate studio setting with approximately 20 members of the LGBT community and their families in hopes of connecting with their deceased loved ones.

== Broadcasters ==
- Canada - OutTV
- Netherlands - OutTV
- United States - here!
