= Drew Stone =

American filmmaker and musician

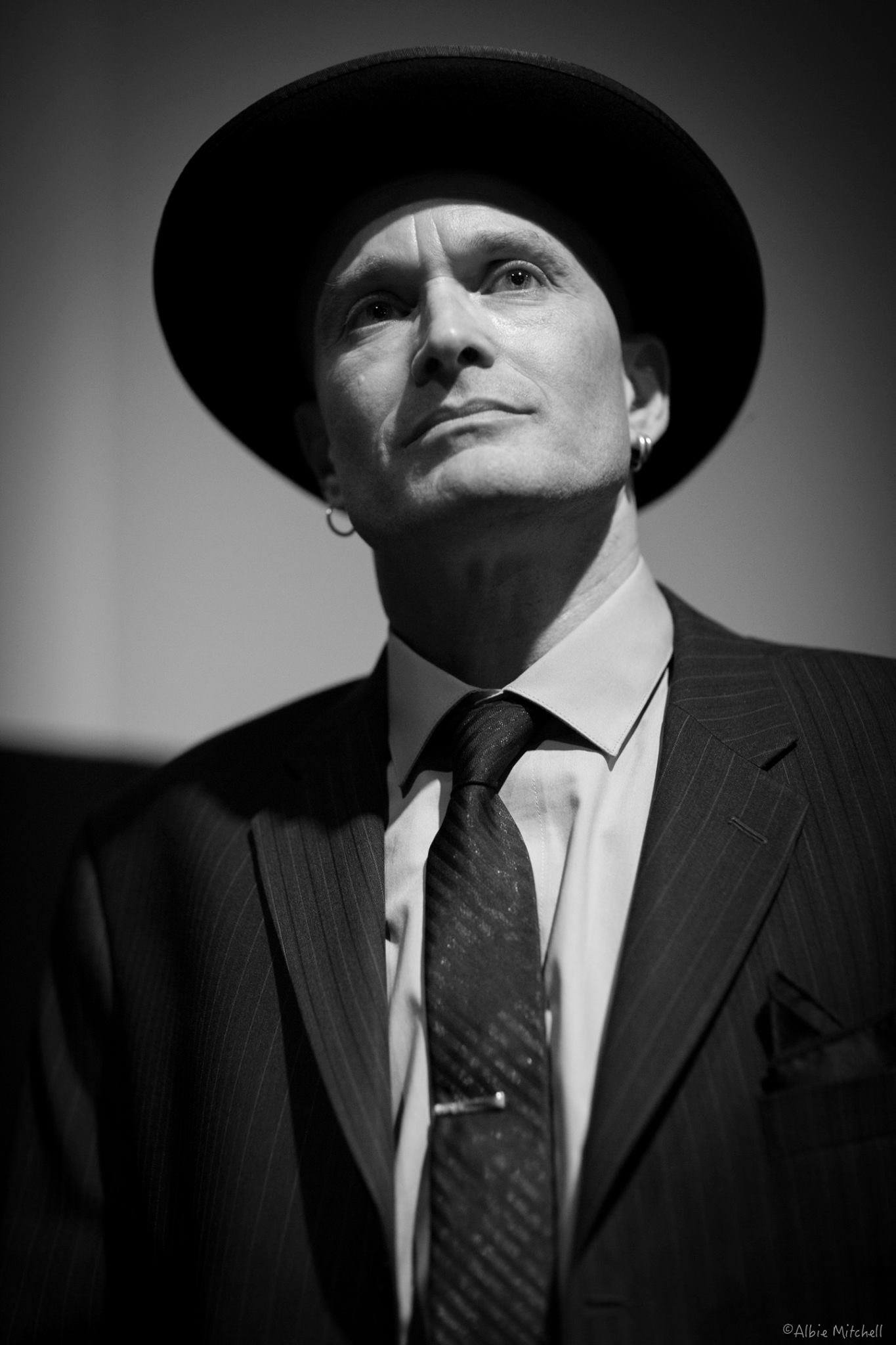
- Born: New York City, U.S.
- Education: Emerson College
- Occupations: Film director, producer, editor, author, musician
- Years active: 1981–present
- Known for: All Ages: The Boston Hardcore Film
- Website: stonefilmsnyc.com

Drew Stone is an American film director, producer, film editor, author, musician and cultural historian. His works include music videos, commercials, documentary films and television.

He played an active role in the early stages of the New York hardcore and Boston hardcore punk scene. He was the co-founder and lead singer of The Mighty C.O.'s of Boston, Massachusetts and The High & The Mighty of New York City. Stone is also known for his career as the front man for New York City's Antidote from 1984 to 2019 as well as playing guitar and singing for The Drew Stone Hit Squad and My War. He now is the front man for Incendiary Device (I.D.). Since 2020, he is known for his work as host of the live video streaming talk show The New York Hardcore Chronicles LIVE!.

== Early life ==
A native New Yorker, Stone was born in Queens and raised in Manhattan, The Bronx and Stamford, Conn. He studied acting at Emerson College in Boston, Massachusetts. His father, Arny Stone, was a filmmaker who won an Academy Award for his film, The Critic , starring Mel Brooks as well as having directed the documentary films Muhammad Ali Me Whee and J.C. Leyendecker The Great American Illustrator. Film editor Richard Stone known for his work on The Hustler, Requiem For a Heavyweight and Michael Jackson's Beat It music video is his Uncle. His brother Evan B. Stone is a cinematographer known for his work on the Reality Television shows Expedition Unknown, Finding Bigfoot and Naked and Afraid. Vocalist / Filmmaker Alan Dubin of Khanate (band) is his second cousin.

== Musical career ==
In 1981 while attending Emerson College, Stone was introduced to the band Society System Decontrol, became heavily involved in the local Boston hardcore music scene and became the lead singer of The Mighty C.O.'s. Upon returning to New York City in 1983 he formed The High & The Mighty and a year later joined hardcore band Antidote. In 2013 he formed The Drew Stone Hit Squad which plays punk, hardcore, traditional and Americana in an acoustic format and later My War. In 2022 Antidote NYHC with Stone as the frontman was rebranded Incendiary Device (I.D.). His contributions to the hardcore punk scene were documented in the books American Hardcore: A Tribal History and NYHC New York Hardcore 1980–1990

== Film career ==
After working for years as a crew member on film sets in a variety of roles in 1992 Stone formed New York City-based film Production Company, Stone Films NYC and produced numerous music videos (Onyx, Run-DMC, Type O Negative, Biohazard, Kings X, Insane Clown Posse) by himself and produced / directed with his brother Evan B. Stone as "The Stone Brothers" (Vanilla Ice, Channel Zero, Stuck Mojo). He has directed videos for Agnostic Front, Sick of It All, Fury of Five and Madball. He is a four-time X-Tremmy award winner with his Urban Street-Bike Warriors series of extreme sports films and director of the MTV True Life episode "I Live To Ride," which exposed the extreme sport of motorcycle stunt riding to millions worldwide. In 2006 he created the Urban Street-Bike Warriors: Black Sheep Squadron Tour.

He directed and edited All Ages: The Boston Hardcore Film, a documentary film on the influential early Boston hardcore scene which focuses on aspects of the community and culture. The film debuted at the Independent Film Festival of Boston 2012 and was released on DVD in June of that year. The film features interviews, archival footage and the music of Boston's early hardcore bands including Deep Wound, DYS, Gang Green, Impact Unit, Jerry's Kids, Negative FX, SS Decontrol, The Freeze and The F.U.'s. Also featured in the film are interviews with renowned author Michael Patrick MacDonald ("Easter Rising", "All Souls"), actress Christine Elise McCarthy, Thrasher Magazine editor Jake Phelps, American Hardcore director Paul Rachman, and Newbury Comics owner Michael Dreese.

Stone went on to direct, produce, write and edit Who the Fuck Is That Guy? The Fabulous Journey of Michael Alago which profiles the turbulent life of A & R man Michael Alago. The film includes interviews with James Hetfield, Lars Ulrich and Kirk Hammett of Metallica, Cyndi Lauper, Rob Zombie, Phil Anselmo and John Lydon. After being released in theaters, the film debuted on Netflix for a three-year run in September 2017.

The New York Hardcore Chronicles Film and later The New York Hardcore Chronicles Film 1.5. which both spotlight the New York Hardcore scene and feature Roger Miret of Agnostic Front, Ray Cappo of Youth of Today, Craig Setari of Sick of It All were both released soon after.

In 2020 Stone followed his passion for music and adventure and traveled to Israel to direct The Jews and The Blues. The film features the musicians Gal Nisman, Lazer Lloyd, Gili Yalo, Yaron Ben Ami and Yemen Blues.

The New York Hardcore Chronicles LIVE! was launched during the COVID-19 pandemic and quickly found a worldwide audience. Guests through the years have included Moby, Jamey Jasta, Scott Ian, Brooke Smith, Max Cavalera, Dave Lombardo, Lars Frederiksen, Ian Mackaye and many others. The landmark 300th episode with Ray Cappo aired in December 2023.

According to Danny Schuler, as of 2024 Stone is currently working on a Biohazard documentary.

== Discography ==
- 1984 – The High & The Mighty "Crunch On" Demo (Vocals) Self released
- 1989 – Antidote "Return 2 Burn" (Vocals) Metropolis Records
- 1990 – Antidote "Viva Los Pendejos" (Vocals) Music For Nations
- 1994 – Biohazard "State Of The World Address" (Background Vocals) Warner Brothers Records
- 1994 – Dog Eat Dog "If These Are Good Times" (Background Vocals) Roadrunner Records
- 1996 – Antidote / The High & The Mighty "The A7 & Beyond" (Vocals) Grand Theft Audio
- 1999 – Nucleus "F.T.W." (Guitar, Vocals) Century Media Records
- 1999 – Biohazard "New World Disorder" (Background Vocals) Mercury Records
- 2012 – Antidote "No Peace in our Time" (Vocals) Bridge Nine Records
- 2014 – The High & The Mighty "Crunch On" (Vocals) Radio Raheem Records
- 2014 – Sick Of It All "Last Act Of Defiance" (Background Vocals) Century Media Records
- 2017 – Antidote "The Rock Years" (Vocals) Old School Metal Records
- 2017 – Antidote "Deadly Rain" (Vocals) Matinee Book 7" compilation Radio Raheem Records
- 2018 – The Drew Stone Hit Squad "I Still Love Living In The City" (Vocals, Guitar) Digital Independent release
- 2019 – Sick Of It All "Wake the Sleeping Dragon!" (Background Vocals) Century Media Records
- 2021 – Antidote NYHC "Scarred" A7 Back to the New York Hardcore Roots Compilation (Vocals) Pitchfork NY Hardwear
- 2021 – Antidote NYHC "Divided State" Strength Thru Unity A Conne Island Benefit Compilation (Vocals) Unity Worldwide Records
- 2021 – Antidote NYHC "If The Kids Are United" Fan Brawl Oi 2 The World Compilation Vol. 4 (Vocals) Oi 2 The World
- 2021 – Antidote NYHC "Scarred" E.P. (Vocals) Unity Worldwide Records
- 2023 – Incendiary Device (Self Titled) (Vocals) Bridge Nine Records
- 2026 – Incendiary Device "New York City" (Vocals) Demons Run Amok Records / Creep Records
- In production – Incendiary Device "Stand and be Counted" E.P. (Vocals) Demons Run Amok Records / Creep Records

== Filmography ==
- 1996 – Sepultura "Third World Chaos" (Producer)
- 1997 – Biohazard "Chaos Ensues" Long form video (Producer)
- 2000 – 12'oclock "NYC Street-Bike Outlaws A Film About The Life" (Director)
- 2001 – Urban Street-Bike Warriors (Director)
- 2002 – J.C. Leyendecker – The Great American Illustrator (Line Producer)
- 2002 – Urban Street-Bike Warriors No. 2 "Black Sheep Squadron" (Director)
- 2002 – Urban Street-Bike Warriors "Smashes Bashes and Crashes" (Director)
- 2002 – Outlaw Street Cars: Death Or Glory (Director)
- 2002 – Urban Street-Car Warriors (Director)
- 2003 – Urban Street-Bike Warriors No. 3 "Don't Forget the Struggle, Don't Forget the Streets" (Director)
- 2004 – MTV "True Life" Season 9, episode 13 "I Live To Ride" (Director)
- 2004 – Urban Street-Bike Warriors Tony D. Freestyle "Respect the Hustle" (Director)
- 2005 – Urban Street-Bike Warriors "Worldwide Live" (Director)
- 2006 – Passion And Brotherhood (Director)
- 2007 – Mike Metzger "Godfather of Freestyle Motorcross" (Associate Producer)
- 2012 – All Ages: The Boston Hardcore Film (Director)
- 2017 – Who the Fuck Is That Guy? The Fabulous Journey of Michael Alago (Director)
- 2017 – The New York Hardcore Chronicles Film (Director)
- 2018 – Muhammad Ali "Me Whee" (Executive Producer)
- 2018 – The New York Hardcore Chronicles Film 1.5 (Director)
- 2021 – Drew Stone's Hardcore Chronicles (Series, 4 Episodes) (Director)
- 2022 – The Jews and The Blues (Director)
- 2026 – Is It in Time? Is It in Tune? And Is It Musical? The Legacy of Linda McKnight (Short Film) (Director)
- In Production – L'Amour "The Rock Capitol of Brooklyn"
- In Production – Biohazard "Straight Outta Brooklyn"
- In Production – Finders Keepers (Dramatic Film)

== Music videos ==
- 1988 – Eric B. and Rakim "Follow The Leader" (2nd A.D.)
- 1988 – Fat Boys "Louie Louie" (2nd A.D.)
- 1988 – Eric B. and Rakim "Microphone Fiend" (2nd A.D.)
- 1988 – Danzig "Mother" (Stage Manager)
- 1988 – Jazzy Jeff and the Fresh Price "Parents Don't Understand" (Stage Manager)
- 1988 – Jazzy Jeff and the Fresh Prince "Nightmare on My Street" (Stage Manager)
- 1988 – The Pursuit of Happiness "World Shut Your Mouth" (Stage Manager)
- 1988 – Fates Warning "Silent Cries" (Stage Manager)
- 1988 – The Pogues "Fairytale of New York" (Stage Manager)
- 1988 – RUN – DMC / Beastie Boys "Together Forever" Tour Promo (Production Assistant)
- 1988 – Beastie Boys "License to Ill’ Live VHS (Production Assistant)
- 1989 – Nuclear Assault "Trail Of Tears" (Producer)
- 1990 – Suicidal Tendencies "Send Me Your Money" (Stage Manager)
- 1992 – Alice in Chains "Angry Chair" (Stage Manager)
- 1992 – Pro-Pain "Pound For A Pound" (assistant director)
- 1992 – Biohazard "Punishment" (Producer)
- 1993 – Biohazard "Shades Of Grey" (Producer)
- 1993 – ONYX "Slam" (Producer)
- 1993 – Biohazard / ONYX "Slam (Bionyx Mix) (Producer)
- 1993 – ONYX "Shiftee" (Producer)
- 1993 – Type O Negative "Black #1" (Producer)
- 1993 – Supercat feat. The Notorious B.I.G. & Puff Daddy "Dolly My Baby" (Producer)
- 1993 – RUN – DMC "Ohh Wahtcha Gonna Do (Producer)
- 1993 – Da Youngsta's w/ Fat Joe "Wild Child" (Producer)
- 1994 – Machine Head "Old" (Producer)
- 1994 – Biohazard "Tales From The Hardside" (Producer)
- 1994 – Biohazard "After Forever" (Producer)
- 1994 – Madball "Down By Law" (Director / Producer)
- 1994 – Flatliners "Live Evil" (Producer)
- 1994 – Flatliners "Satanic Verses" (Producer)
- 1994 – Fatal "Timber" (Producer)
- 1994 – Brutal Truth "Godplayer" (Producer)
- 1994 – Monster Voodoo Machine "Bastard Is" (Producer)
- 1994 – Kings X "Dogman" (Producer)
- 1994 – Insane Clown Posse "Chickin Huntin" (Producer)
- 1994 – Vanilla Ice "The Wrath" (Producer)
- 1995 – Black Sabbath Tribute "Nativity In Black" E.P.K. (Director / Producer)
- 1995 – 8-Off "Ghetto Girl" (Producer)
- 1995 – Madball "Pride" (Director / Producer)
- 1996 – Vertex "One Like A Son" (Director / Producer)
- 1996 – Merauder "Master Killer"(Director / Producer)
- 1995 – Stuck Mojo "Not Promised Tomorrow" (Director / Producer)
- 1995 – Channel Zero "Sucking Me Dry For My Energy" (Director / Producer)
- 1996 – Fury Of Five "Do Or Die" (Director / Producer)
- 1996 – Nastasee "Music For The People" (Director / Producer)
- 1997 – Sub-Zero "Higher Power" (Director / Producer)
- 1997 – Vasaria "Abduction" (Director / Producer)
- 1998 – Propellerheads – "Bang On" (Producer)
- 1998 – Agnostic Front "Gotta Go" (Director / Producer)
- 2000 – Nucleus "Boulder Breath" (Director / Producer)
- 2000 – Shelter "In The Van Again" (Director / Producer)
- 2002 – Brand New Sin "My World" (Director/ Producer)
- 2008 – Garth "Culti" Vader "Roll Up, Blaze Up" (Director / Producer)
- 2012 – The Mob "Going Back To Queens" (Director / Producer)
- 2015 – Sick Of It All "Road Less Travelled" (Director / Producer)
- 2019 – The Take "Elitist" (Director / Producer)
- 2019 – The Take "Revolution Now" (Director / Producer)
- 2020 – No Redeeming Social Value "Ratbones" (Director / Producer)
- 2026 – Incendiary Device "New York City" (Producer)
- 2026 – Incendiary Device "Young At Heart" (Producer)
- 2026 – Incendiary Device "Aggression" (Producer)

== Author ==
- 2021 – The New York Hardcore Chronicles vol. No. 1 (1980–1989) Self published
- 2023 – The New York Hardcore Chronicles vol. No. 2 (1990–1999) Self published
- 2025 – London '77 : The Lost Archive The Photography of Gregory Rudolph Smith Generation Records
- In Production – Tales from the Forbidden Zone : Growing Up in the Blank Generation (Autobiography)
