= Unraveled (film) =

2011 American documentary film

- Directed by: Marc H. Simon
- Produced by: Miranda Bailey; Steven Cantor; Terry Clark; Daniel Laikind; Matthew Makar; Marc H. Simon
- Starring: Marc Dreier
- Edited by: Christina Burchard; Alyse Ardell Spiegel
- Music by: Chris Hajian
- Release date: May 2, 2011 (Hot Docs Festival)
- Country: United States
- Language: English

Unraveled is a 2011 American documentary film about lawyer Marc Dreier, who was arrested for orchestrating a fraud scheme that netted 750 million dollars from hedge funds and clients. Set during his house arrest, the film recounts Drier's struggle to prepare for the possibility of life imprisonment with first-person flashbacks of his actions.

The film also shows Drier's attempts to grasp his unraveling. The film was produced and directed by Marc H. Simon of Stick Figure Productions. Other producers include Matthew Makar, Steven Cantor, and Miranda Bailey. The band Red Wanting Blue was commissioned to write an original song for the film about Dreier's experiences. The song is titled "Magic Man", and plays in its entirety in the documentary.
