= No One Dies in Lily Dale =

2011 film

- Directed by: Steven Cantor
- Produced by: Nancy Abraham Steven Cantor Terry Clark Allan Grafman Daniel Laikind Tamara Laine Damon Leary Bradley J. Levin Sheila Nevins Neal Pilzer Pax Wassermann
- Starring: Michelle Whitedove; Rev. B. Anne Gehman
- Cinematography: Claudia Woloshin
- Edited by: Pax Wassermann
- Music by: James Lavino
- Release date: 2011

No One Dies in Lily Dale is a 2011 film directed by Steven Cantor.

== Synopsis ==
The documentary focuses on residents of Lily Dale, a small town in upstate New York with an unusually high number of mediums.

== Background ==
According to the documentary, Lily Dale has the highest concentration of mediums in the world, and has 25,000 visitors annually.

== Reception ==
The documentary received mostly positive reviews from critics. Robert Lloyd of Los Angeles Times called it "colorful and engaging if not deeply illuminating or historically comprehensive." Cynthia Fuchs of PopMatters gave it a rating of 7 out of 10.

Joe Nickell, in a review published by the Center for Inquiry, rated the film 2 out of 4. Nickell wrote that it explored "the poignancy of the human longings that draw people there" but did not interrogate the underlying superstitions involved.
