= Bettie Page Reveals All =

2012 documentary film directed by Mark Mori

- Directed by: Mark Mori
- Written by: Doug Miller
- Produced by: Mark Mori; Thorpe Mori
- Starring: Bettie Page
- Cinematography: Grant Barbeito; Angel Barroeta; Doug Miller; Jay Miracle
- Edited by: Julie Chabot; Douglas Miller; Jay Miracle
- Music by: Gary Guttman
- Production company: Single Spark Pictures
- Distributed by: Music Box Films (USA); Single Spark Pictures (world-wide)
- Release dates: 8 September 2012 (LA INDIE Film Festival); 22 November 2013 (USA-wide)
- Running time: 101 minutes
- Country: United States
- Language: English
- Box office: $73,372

Bettie Page Reveals All is a 2012 American documentary film directed by Mark Mori about the life history and cultural influence of model Bettie Page. It was written by Doug Miller.

Much of its narration is from audiotape interviews with Page. Individuals offering commentary on Page and her significance include Dita Von Teese, Hugh Hefner, Rebecca Romijn, Tempest Storm, Bunny Yeager, Paula Klaw, Jessicka, Mamie Van Doren and Naomi Campbell.

== Premise ==
Pin-up model and cult icon Bettie Page recounts the true story of her life. Augmenting Page's words with photos, archive movie footage and interviews, the film describes how her free expression was a factor in the cultural changes which led to America's sexual revolution.

== Principal cast ==
- Bettie Page
- Dita Von Teese
- Hugh Hefner
- Tricia Helfer
- Mamie Van Doren
- Rebecca Romijn
- Stacy Burke
- Christina Aguilera
- Naomi Campbell
- Beyonce
- Rihanna
- Madonna
- Lady Gaga
- Katy Perry
- Devin DeVasquez

== Reception ==
As of 2014, the film holds a 75 percent "fresh" rating on the review aggregator Rotten Tomatoes with 21 positive reviews and 7 negative and an average rating of 6.8/10.

Variety wrote: "Veteran docu producer Mori’s evidently crowd-funded film could be more stylishly packaged, as it has a somewhat routine midlevel-cable-production feel. But the content is engaging, and the use of old movie clips to illustrate biographical details (excerpting exploitation cheapie Married Too Young when Page discusses a disastrous first marriage) is amusing."

The New York Times wrote: "Directed by Mark Mori, written by Douglas Miller and — best of all — narrated by Page in her low, gruff Southern drawl, Bettie Page Reveals All covers much of the material that’s been related elsewhere, but with some nice differences. ... Mr. Mori actually seems to have liked Page, for whom he displays genuine, believable affection, and he shares the bad along with the good without giggles, judgment or rank sensationalism. Her voice-over ... suggests that Page liked him in turn. The results are absorbing if sometimes unhappy, both in the tale and its telling. No life is seamless, and not every biographical portrait needs to be, but this one is so riddled with awkward transitions, including on the soundtrack, that it tends to lurch distractingly, as if Mr. Mori were still trying to figure out how to piece the whole thing together."

Time Out wrote: "Two Bettie Pages emerge from Mark Mori’s sensationalized profile: First and immortally, there’s the squirmy ’50s pinup, a libertine who brought a mile-wide wink to scenes of bondage. ... Then we hear the older Page, recorded on tape before her 2008 death, casting back on her days in the limelight and beyond ... Both ladies deserve better. It requires a facile grasp of sociocultural history to suggest that Page’s niche eroticism kicked off the sexual revolution – even if it’s Hugh Hefner saying it. Her hasty departure from the industry (coupled with an FBI investigation and a conversion to evangelical Christianity) deserves franker scrutiny, from thinkers deeper than Shalom Harlow. And Mori’s interview with the older Page (a coup) is frustrating, not just for revealing less than “all,” but for his inability to push a paradoxically modest person beyond skin-deep significance."

RogerEbert.com wrote: "[Page's] voiceover track is the reason to see the film, which is mainly conventional in structure and sometimes sloppy in execution. But any time the film abandons the tired talking-head formula, with experts like Hugh Hefner and Dita Von Teese needlessly telling us why Page is influential, and goes back to Page talking, it finds its footing."

== Accolades ==
Bettie Page Reveals All won the Jury Award for Best Feature Documentary at the 2013 Garden State Film Festival.
