= The Legend of 420 =

- Movie poster
- Directed by: Peter Spirer
- Release date: 2017
- Running time: 87 minutes
- Country: United States
- Language: English

The Legend of 420 is a documentary about marijuana consumption in the United States. It was directed by Peter Spirer and released in 2017.
