= Dancer (2016 film) =

- Directed by: Steven Cantor
- Produced by: Gabrielle Tana
- Starring: Sergei Polunin
- Cinematography: Mark Wolf
- Edited by: Federico Rosenzvit
- Music by: Ilan Eshkeri
- Production companies: BBC Films; Baby Cow Films; Magnolia Mae Films; Stick Figure Studios
- Release date: 2016

Dancer is a 2016 American documentary film directed by Steven Cantor.

== Synopsis ==
The documentary follows ballet dancer Sergei Polunin as he questions his career and commitment to dance at the height of his professional success.

== Reception ==
Upon its release the film received generally positive reviews. The Independent reviewer Geoffrey Macnab praised the film's usage of archival sources, described it as "poignant", and gave four out of five stars. Reviewing from The Irish Times, Tara Brady complimented Polunin's performance and also awarded the film four stars. Wendy Ide from The Guardian praised the archive footage and called it a "handsome documentary does a fine job of both capturing the breathtaking precision and physicality of Polunin at the top of his game". However, she criticised that "the truth is rather more complex than the unsettled family background that is squarely blamed", and gave the film three stars. In a mixed review, Peter Bradshew from The Guardian critiqued the film as "a sympathetic, serviceable but respectfully unintrusive documentary".

== Awards ==
Year	Award	Notes
2016	British Independent Film Awards	Nominee - Best Documentary
2017	Barcelona-Sant Jordi International Film Festival	Winner - Critics Award, Steven Cantor
2017	Dublin Film Critics Circle Awards	Nominee - Best Documentary
2017	PGA Awards	Nominee - Outstanding Producer of Documentary Theatrical Motion Pictures, Gabrielle Tana
