= Peter Baxter (filmmaker) =

English filmmaker

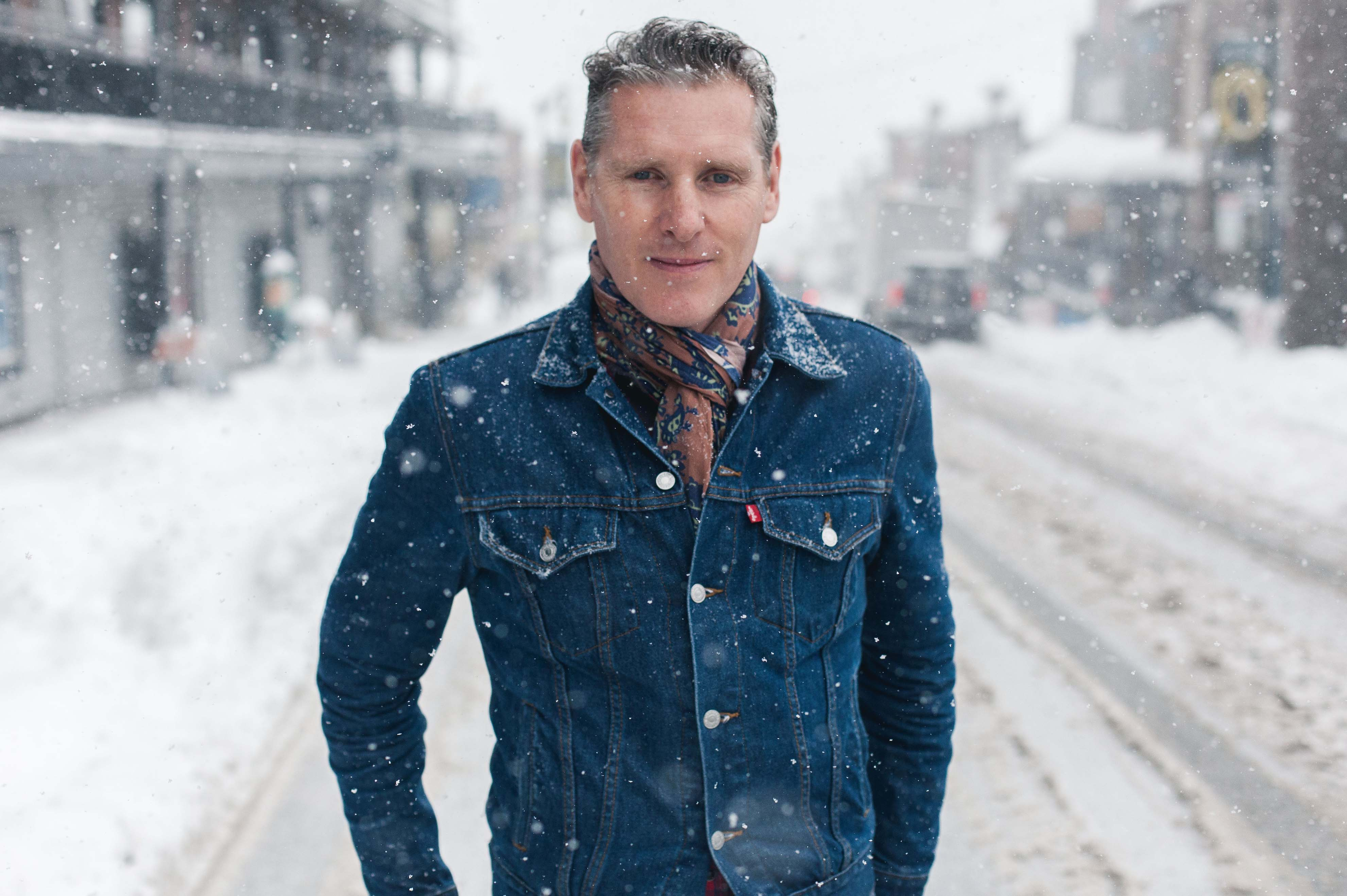
- Born: England
- Occupations: Filmmaker and Film Executive
- Known for: Filmmaker and President and co-founder of Slamdance

Peter Baxter is president and co-founder of Slamdance, and a filmmaker.

== Career ==
=== Slamdance Film Festival ===
In 1995 Baxter co-founded Slamdance Film Festival as an independent alternative to Sundance Film Festival in Utah. Since its inception, Baxter has been responsible for developing Slamdance into a showcase for the discovery of new talent. Filmmakers who first gained notice at the festival include Christopher Nolan, Oren Peli, Marc Forester, Jared Hess, Lena Dunham, Bong Joon-ho, Behn Zeitlin, Anthony and Joe Russo, Andrew Huang, Seth Gordon, Matt Johnson and Lynn Shelton.

When the festival began it received 48 submissions. Slamdance now receives around 10,000 submissions every year. Baxter created Slamdance's mantra "by filmmakers, for filmmakers" based on the fact the organization is fully programmed by filmmakers. After helping launch the festival, Baxter then started a screenplay competition for new writers. He then guided Slamdance into a year-round support system for emerging artists with national theatrical exhibition of independent film and a film distribution venture called Slamdance Presents. Speaking about the organization Baxter has said "Slamdance is an ongoing experiment that has proven year after year really that when it comes to recognizing talent and launching careers, the independent and grass-roots film communities can really do it themselves."

In January, 2019 Baxter summed up Slamance's 25th anniversary by saying "Slamdance has created a community of emerging and established filmmakers over the past 25 years. The goal is for experienced filmmakers to nurture and help new filmmakers build sustainable careers."

In January, 2022 Baxter was responsible for launching the Slamdance Channel, an anti-algorithm, artist-led streaming platform aimed at making independent films more accessible."

=== Film work ===
Baxter's film work includes Wild in the Streets, a documentary feature about an ancient football game; I Want To Be an American, an experimental feature film based on the surrealist parlor game Exquisite Corpse; and DIY, a documentary about the do-it-yourself filmmaking movement. In 2017, Baxter directed the documentary film Spirit Game, about lacrosse and the Haudenosaunee, that was theatrically released to positive reviews. In 2020, Baxter executive produced You Never Had It: An Evening With Bukowski, a documentary Slamdance and Kino Lorber theatrically released to critical acclaim scoring one hundred percent fresh on Rotten Tomatoes. In 2021 Baxter co-produced Q: Into The Storm, a six part documentary series for HBO directed by Slamdance alumni Cullen Hoback. In 2022, Baxter executive produced Day Shift starring Jamie Foxx and Snoop Dogg and written by Tyler Tice for Netflix. At 957 million minutes watched, Day Shift topped the Nielson streaming chart during the week of August 15–21, 2022.

=== Personal life ===
Baxter was born in England and grew up in Gloucestershire. He is a graduate of St. Catherine's College, Oxford University. Baxter lives in Los Angeles with his wife and two daughters.
