= Blood Ties: The Life and Work of Sally Mann =

1994 film

- Directed by: Steven Cantor; Peter Spirer
- Produced by: Steven Cantor; Paul Dokuchitz; Mark Mori; Constance Van Flandern
- Cinematography: Peter Spirer
- Edited by: Steven Cantor
- Music by: R.E.M.
- Production company: Moving Target Prods.
- Distributed by: Strand Releasing
- Release date: January 1994 (Sundance)
- Running time: 30 minutes
- Country: United States
- Language: English

Blood Ties: The Life and Work of Sally Mann is a 1994 American short documentary film directed by Steven Cantor and Peter Spirer. It was premiered at the 1994 Sundance Film Festival and was nominated for an Academy Award for Best Documentary Short.

The documentary looks at some of the controversy surrounding Sally Mann's book Immediate Family, which contains non-sexual photographs of her pre-adolescent children in various states of dress. Some religious groups had accused her of making child pornography, and the film focuses on Mann's defense of her art. Filmmaker Cantor followed up this short with a full-length documentary about Mann in 2005: What Remains: The Life and Work of Sally Mann.

Blood Ties was released in New York City and Los Angeles on March 4, 1994 as part of the program Oscar Shorts 1993. It was also shown at the San Francisco International Film Festival (April–May 1994), the Atlanta Film and Video Festival (June 1994), and the USA Film Festival in Dallas, Texas (April 1994), at which it won a Special Jury Award.
