= What Remains: The Life and Work of Sally Mann =

Documentary film

- Directed by: Steven Cantor
- Produced by: Steven Cantor; Daniel Laikind; Pax Wassermann; Mandy Stein; Suzanne Georges
- Starring: Sally Mann
- Cinematography: Paul Dokuchitz
- Edited by: Pax Wassermann; Sari Gilman
- Music by: Billy Coté; Mary Lorson
- Production company: Stick Figure Productions
- Distributed by: HBO Documentary Films
- Release date: 2005
- Running time: 80 minutes
- Country: United States
- Language: English

What Remains: The Life and Work of Sally Mann is a 2005 film directed and produced by Steven Cantor, which documents the photography and story of photographer Sally Mann at her Virginia farm home. The film documents the photographer's progression from a child to a mother, and the struggles Mann faces through her public and private life.

The movie garnered quite favorable reviews from publications such as The New York Times.

== See also ==
- Blood Ties: The Life and Work of Sally Mann
