= Gary Schwartz =

American psychologist and parapsychologist (born 1944)

Gary E. Schwartz
- Born: June 14, 1944 (age 82); Mineola, New York
- Occupation: Parapsychologist

Gary E. Schwartz is an American psychologist, author, parapsychologist and professor at the University of Arizona and the director of its Laboratory for Advances in Consciousness and Health. Schwartz researches the veracity of mediums and energy healing. His mediumship experiments have been described as flawed by critics who have argued that they failed to use adequate precautions against fraud and sensory leakage, relied on non-standardized, untested dependent variables and unaccounted for researcher degrees of freedom.

== Biography ==
Schwartz was born on June 14, 1944, in Mineola, New York.

Schwartz received his PhD from Harvard University and was a professor of psychiatry and psychology at Yale University as well as Director of the Yale Psychophysiology Center and co-director of the Yale Behavioral Medicine Clinic from 1976 to 1988. Currently, he is Professor of Psychology, Medicine, Neurology, Psychiatry, and Surgery and the Director of the Laboratory for Advances in Consciousness and Health in the Department of Psychology at the University of Arizona.

Schwartz says that his initial interest in psychic ability stemmed from a car accident he had with his then wife while driving on the FDR highway in Manhattan. The car was reportedly stopped on the roadway when he "heard a voice" tell him to "put his seat belt on." He told his wife to do so, and moments later, said they were rear ended by a car going 50 MPH. He claims that having his life saved by a mysterious voice prompted him to begin his research into where that voice might have come from.

In his early career, Schwartz wrote on biofeedback research and health psychology. Schwartz's more recent research has been in parapsychology and consciousness-based healthcare. His VERITAS research project, which concluded in 2008, was created primarily to test the hypothesis that the consciousness (or identity) of a person survives physical death. Schwartz performed experiments at the University of Arizona testing mediums such as John Edward, of the TV show Crossing Over, and Allison DuBois, who inspired the TV series Medium. Schwartz believes that DuBois could contact dead people. Schwartz says his experiments with DuBois included a reading for proponent of alternative medicine Deepak Chopra following the death of his father that Chopra characterized as 77% accurate.

Gary Schwartz is viewed as a leader of counter-Establishment using his academic career to enable “the happy fantasies of pseudoscience and the paranormal.” Among his hundreds of academic papers is a 3-part series entitled “God, Synchronicity, and Postmaterialist Psychology” published in the journal Spirituality in Clinical Practice by the American Psychological Association, where Schwartz describes eleven coincidences that he found so “increasingly improbable,” he figured God must have been signaling him that souls of dead people collaborate with the divine to orchestrate personally meaningful synchronicities.

== Controversies ==
On Fox News on the Geraldo at Large show, October 6, 2007, Geraldo Rivera alleged Schwartz had overstepped his position as a university researcher by requesting money from a bereaved father to fund research into mediumship.

Schwartz's methods have prompted criticism from skeptics such as University of Oregon professor Ray Hyman, who says Professor Schwartz's research deviates from the accepted norms of scientific methodology, and criticizes Schwartz for research errors such as inappropriate statistical tests and using subjects predisposed to believe in psychic abilities. Skeptic Robert Todd Carroll maintains that Schwartz's evaluation of mediums is subjective and a product of "wishful thinking." When retired stage magician and skeptic James Randi asked the University of Arizona to submit Schwartz's research data to an independent panel for evaluation, Schwartz declined because he thought that the panel, which he believed would be picked by Randi, would be biased.

Christian Battista, Nicolas Gauvrit and Etienne LeBel have suggested that Schwartz's data from mediumship experiments is unreliable as there are serious methodological flaws including biased sample sizes and unaccounted for researcher degrees of freedom.

== Books ==
- Gary E. Schwartz and John Edward (Foreword), "The Sacred Promise: How Science Is Discovering Spirit's Collaboration with Us in Our Daily Lives," (Atria Books/Beyond Words) (January 11, 2011) ISBN 978-1582702582
- Gary E. Schwartz, William L. Simon and Richard Carmona, "The Energy Healing Experiments: Science Reveals Our Natural Power to Heal," Atria Books (August 7, 2007) ISBN 978-0743292375
- Gary E. Schwartz and William L. Simon, "The G.O.D. Experiments: How Science Is Discovering God In Everything, Including Us," Atria (April 4, 2006) ISBN 978-0743477406
- Gary E. Schwartz and William L. Simon, "The Truth About Medium: Extraordinary Experiments with the real Allison DuBois of NBC's Medium and other Remarkable Psychics," Hampton Roads Publishing Company (October 2005) ISBN 1-57174-459-2
- Gary E. Schwartz, William L. Simon, and Deepak Chopra (Foreword). The Afterlife Experiments (Mar 1, 2002) ISBN 0-7434-3658-X
- Gary E. Schwartz, Ph.D. and Linda G. S. Russek, "Living Energy Universe: A Fundamental Discovery that Transforms Science and Medicine," Hampton Roads Publishing Company (1999)
- Paul M. Lehrer (Editor), Robert L. Woolfolk (Editor), Gary E. Schwartz "Principles and Practice of Stress Management," (The Guilford Press; 2 Sub edition, January 29, 1993) ISBN 0-89862-766-4
- Richard J. Davidson (Editor), Gary E. Schwartz (Editor), David Shapiro, "Consciousness and Self-Regulation, Advances in Research and Theory Volumes 1 through 4," Plenum Press (April 30, 1986) ISBN 0-306-42048-1
