= Peter Spirer =

American film director

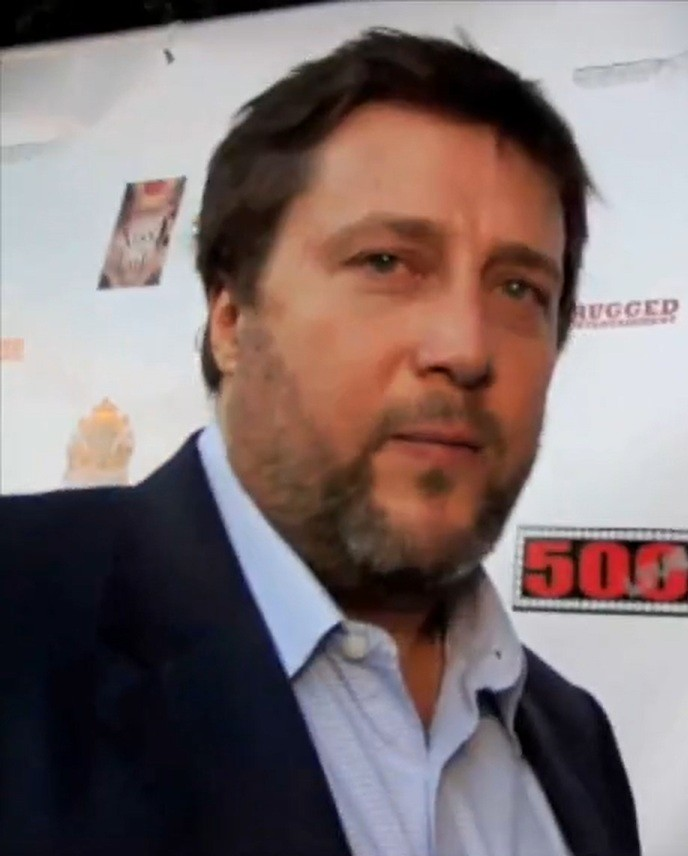
Spirer in 2009

Peter Spirer, founder of Rugged Entertainment, is an Academy and Emmy Award-Nominated director and producer whose films have been official selections at Sundance Film Festival.

Peter has directed over 20 feature films with worldwide distribution on multiple platforms including Rhyme & Reason, BEEF, Tupac Shakur: Thug Angel and Notorious B.I.G: Bigger Than Me. His latest films are The Legend of 420 which explores the legalization of cannabis; Spirit Game: Pride of a Nation an insider's look into the Iroquois Nationals lacrosse team - with the first-ever international championship held on sovereign land; and Sacheen, about Sacheen Littlefeather's life, advocacy for Native American civil rights, and her fateful night at the 1973 Oscars.

== Films and Productions ==
In 1993, Spirer's short documentary Blood Ties: The Life and Work of Sally Mann was nominated for an Academy Award.

Spirer's documentary Rhyme and Reason(1997) made Rolling Stone's 40 Greatest Rock Documentaries list.

In 2003 he was the winner of the Jury Award for the Ojai Film Festival for his debut narrative feature film Dunsmore.

Spirer has produced a number of musician-focused documentary films, including Rhyme and Reason, Beef I-III, Tupac: Thug Angel, and Notorious B.I.G.: Bigger Than Life. Many of his films play regularly on cable television networks. His films, Kiss and Tail: The Hollywood Jump Off, and Black and Blue: Legends of the Hip-Hop Cop, were in rotation on Showtime.

In 2009 he produced and directed the feature film Just Another Day, starring Wood Harris and Jamie Hector (both from HBO's The Wire), which was distributed by Image Entertainment.

Smash (2009 and rereleased in 2020) gives a look inside a biannual school bus race in Florida, a harrowing event where carnage and collisions are most definitely encouraged.

Rhyme and Punishment (2011) examines at the role of prison in hip-hop culture and focuses on aspects of the story not covered by the news and popular media. The film features interviews with convicted rappers Beanie Sigel, Prodigy, Cassidy, Project Pat, Immortal Technique, Slick Rick, and others. These artists who were at the top of their game when they got locked up explain the details of the crimes that led to their arrests, and describe their experiences in prison.

Soulja Boy: The Movie (2011) follows the young and charismatic yet polarizing entrepreneur who offers an all-access glimpse into his life, his music, and his fascinating career.

In 2016, Spirer was the executive producer of the film Queen Mimi. The documentary looks into the life of Mimi, an unhoused woman who went from living in a laundromat to walking down the red carpet with Zach Galifianakis.

First premiering on STARZ, Spirit Game: Pride of the Nation (2017) offers an insider's look into the Iroquois Nationals lacrosse team; the first-ever international lacrosse championship held on sovereign land. Spirer produced the film which won Best Documentary at the Red Nation Film Festival.

The Legend of 420 (2017) Explores the controversial use of marijuana and the evolution of mainstream society, from a dangerous narcotic listed as a Schedule 1 Drug substance since the 1970s, to the rush to decriminalize it today. What has changed and why? What will the cannabis industry look like in five years? Will it retain its integrity as a homegrown industry or be co-opted by Big Business? Experts, growers, celebrities, and politicians weigh in on the future of Canna-business.

Michael Des Barres: Who do you want me to be? (2020) Spirer is an Executive Producer. The doc focuses on the son of a junkie aristocrat and a schizophrenic showgirl who becomes the master of reinvention on a 50+ year journey through rock and roll, TV, and film.

Spirer directed and produced Sacheen, a short documentary film that focused on Sacheen Littlefeather, an activist for Native American civil rights, and her telling of her life's story, including her speech on behalf of Marlon Brando at the 45th Academy Awards and later embrace of traditional Native American medicine The documentary won two awards: Best Documentary Short at the 2019 American Indian Film Festival and the Audience Choice Award for Documentary at the 2019 Beverly Hills Film Festival. While the then-71-year-old subject presented herself as a "White Mountain Apache and Yaqui elder", her family revealed after her death that she was in fact a pretendian, of Spanish-Mexican descent and with no tribal ties.
