= Steven Cantor =

American film director

Steven Cantor is an American film and television director and producer. Eight of his films have been nominated for Primetime Emmy Awards, with two winning, including the 2022 Outstanding Documentary prize for When Claude Got Shot. While as a student in graduate school, Cantor was nominated for an Academy Award for his first film, Blood Ties.

Notable works include the films Twyla Moves, Citizen Ashe, Hood River, Tent City, USA, Unraveled, No One Dies in Lily Dale, Reporter with Nicholas Kristof, I Am an Animal, What Remains, Loudquietloud: A Film about Pixies, American Masters: Willie Nelson, Devil's Playground, and Dancer. Cantor directed and executive produced the HBO unscripted series Family Bonds, and has executive produced other television series through his Stick Figure Productions banner. In 2017, Cantor produced STEP, documenting the senior year of a girls' high-school step dance team against the background of inner-city Baltimore. It premiered at the 2017 Sundance Film Festival where it won a Special Jury Prize and sold to Fox Searchlight.

== Biography ==
Cantor graduated from the USC School of Cinema-Television. He is the founder of NY based Stick Figure Productions, which he ran for 12 years, prior to selling it in 2013 to Ora, the digital network owned by Carlos Slim Helu. In 2016, Cantor reacquired the company from the Slims and is now once again the sole proprietor.

== Film ==
Blood Ties: The Life and Work of Sally Mann (1994; Cantor was director and producer) was nominated for a 1994 Academy Award in the category of Best Short Subject Documentary; examines photographer Sally Mann's pictures of her children.

Devil's Playground (2002; Cantor was producer) explores the supposed tradition in Amish culture called Rumspringa; the film follows several Amish teenagers who leave their communities to explore the non-Amish world (widely but erroneously believed a normative practice among the Amish). At some point they must decide whether to commit to the strict rules of the Amish Church, or leave their families behind to join "English" society. The film spawned a reality series, "Amish in the City", which Cantor's Stick Figure banner executive produced, as well as a non-fiction book Rumspringa by Tom Shachtman (Farrar, Straus and Giroux, 2007).

American Masters: Willie Nelson: Still is Still Moving (2002; Cantor was director and producer) is an inside look at an American icon as he deals with two families, his relations and his nearly lifelong bandmates.

What Remains (2005; Cantor was director and producer) studies a further project of Mann's, a provocative photo series exploring the way in which nature assimilates the body once life has left it, directly confronting American attitudes towards death. The film screened first at The Sundance Film Festival in 2006 before premiering on HBO.

loudQUIETloud (2006; Cantor was director and producer) follows the ups and downs of alternative music group the Pixies in their unexpected reformation and the reunion tour. I Am an Animal: The Story of Ingrid Newkirk and PETA (2007; Cantor was producer) is acandid and introspective look at the extreme beliefs and motives of Ingrid Newkirk, the British-born co-founder and driving force behind People for the Ethical Treatment of Animals (PETA), the world's largest animal-rights organization.

Reporter (2009; Cantor was producer) follows journalist Nicholas Kristof to the Democratic Republic of Congo to investigate the growing humanitarian crisis. No One Dies in Lily Dale (2011; Cantor was director and producer) explores the idyllic community of Lily Dale, a small town boasting the world's largest concentration of mediums (people who claim to communicate with spirits of the deceased). Unraveled (2011; Cantor was producer) scrutinizes prominent lawyer Marc Dreier's financial crimes, and depicts his struggle to come to terms with the aftermath of his actions. Tent City, U.S.A. (2012; Cantor was director and producer) looks at a homeless community in Nashville, Tennessee. Chasing Tyson (2015; Cantor was director and producer) is a documentary about Evander Holyfield's career defining quest for respectability by beating his notorious rival.

Dancer (2016; Cantor was director) is a documentary about the life of talented but controversial ballet phenom, Sergei Polunin. STEP (2017; Cantor was producer) documents the senior year of a girls' high-school step dance team against the background of inner-city Baltimore. Between Me and My Mind (2019; Cantor was director and producer) is a documentary about Phish frontman Trey Anastasio. What Will Become of Us (2019; Cantor was director) is a documentary about Sir Frank Lowy, the self-made billionaire and founder of Westfield Corporation. When Claude Got Shot (2021; Cantor was producer) is a documentary that follows three families for four years as they wind through the criminal justice system, physical rehabilitation, and personal and family trauma, all stemming from one fateful weekend. Citizen Ashe (2021; Cantor was producer) explores the tennis career of Arthur Ashe and his impact on tennis and HIV activism. Hood River (2021; Cantor was director and producer) is about a high school soccer team in a small Oregon community that struggles to overcome class and racial divide in a quest for both individual and team success. Satisfied (2024) – producer) is a look behind the scenes at the making of the hit musical Hamilton, through the eyes of the female star, Renée Elise Goldsberry. In partnership with Amblin Entertainment. I'm Your Venus (2024) – producer) investigates the legacy and unsolved murder of Venus Xtravaganza, a star of Paris Is Burning.

Four Down (2025) – director and producer) is the survival story of Nick Schuyler following a tragic boating accident that cost the lives of three friends, including two NFL stars. Executive produced by Mark Wahlberg and Snoop Dogg.

== Television ==
Amish in the City (2004; executive produced by Cantor) is a film in which, during the traditional "trying-out-the-world" season of rumspringa, five Amish young adults become roommates with six non-Amish city folk. Cultures collide in this reality-TV offering.

Family Bonds (2004; directed and executive produced by Cantor), explores the lives of the Evangelistas, a family of bail bondsmen and bounty hunters in Long Island. The Biz (2005; executive produced by Cantor), is about nine contestants competing to become the president of their own record label under Warner Music Group. #1 Single (2006; executive produced by Cantor), documents the dating life of singer Lisa Loeb. Kimora: Life in the Fab Lane (2007–2008; executive produced by Cantor), documents the life and Baby Phat fashion empire of former model Kimora Lee Simmons. Repossessed! (2009–2010; executive produced by Cantor), is about "repo men" who repossess peoples' possessions.

Amish: Out of Order (2012; Executive produced by Cantor), documents Mose Gingerich, an Ex-Amish man living in Missouri, and the group of Ex-Amish youths he guides and helps to adapt to English society. American Gypsies (2012; executive produced by Cantor), is a look into the clandestine world of gypsies, through the eyes of one of the most powerful families in New York, the Johns Family.

Catching Hell (2014; executive produced by Cantor); is about a team of underwater spear fishermen battle the challenges of the seas, while trying to eke out a living. The Mask with Henrik Lundqvist (2015; executive produced by Cantor), is a series that features Lundqvist in one-on-one interviews with his celebrity friends as they design the perfect goalie masks.

30 for 30 Shorts (2013 and 2015; executive produced by Cantor), inspired by ESPN's anniversary, ESPN Films' 30 for 30 is a documentary series featuring films from various storytellers.

The Collectors (2014–2015; executive produced by Cantor) is a film in which the staff of the blog FiveThirtyEight tell the stories of professional statisticians, such as the official scorer at a baseball game, a U.S. Census taker or meteorologist. 30 for 30 (2015; produced by Cantor) is a collection of documentary films focused on sports. Born in Synanon (2023; produced by Cantor) is a film in which Cassidy Arkin searches for truth about Synanon, the program she grew up in which descended into a cult.

== Filmography ==
Year	Film	Role	Notes
1994	Blood Ties: The Life and Work of Sally Mann	Director/producer	Nominated — Academy Award for Best Documentary (Short Subject)
1996	Recon	Director/producer	
2000	Bounce: Behind the Velvet Rope	Director/producer	
2001	Crossover	producer	
2002	Devil's Playground	Producer	Nominated — Emmy Award
2002	Willie Nelson: Still is Still Moving	Director/producer	Won — Emmy Award
2003	The AMC Project	Executive producer	
2004	Slasher	Producer	
2004	Amish in the City	Executive Producer	
2004	Family Bonds	Executive producer	Nominated — Emmy Award
2005	What Remains	Director/Producer	Nominated — Emmy Award
2005	The Biz	Executive producer	
2006	#1 Single	Executive producer	
2006	loudQUIETloud: A film about the Pixies	Director/producer	
2007	James Blunt: Return to Kosovo	Director/producer	
2007	I Am an Animal: The Story of Ingrid Newkirk and PETA	Producer	
2007–2008	Kimora: Life in the Fab Lane	Executive producer	
2009	Reporter	Producer	Nominated — Emmy Award
2009	Inside: Night Shift – Repo Men	Executive producer	
2009	Guardian Angels	Executive producer	
2009–2010	Repossessed!	Executive producer	
2010	Amish at the Altar	Executive producer	
2010	Amish: Out of the Order	Executive producer	
2011	Tent City, U.S.A.	Producer	
2011	No One Dies in Lily Dale	Producer	Nominated — Emmy Award
2011	Unraveled	Producer	
2012	Amish: Out of Order	Executive producer	
2012	American Gypsies	Executive producer	
2013	30 for 30 Shorts	Executive producer	
2014	Catching Hell	Executive producer	
2014–2015	The Collectors	Executive producer	
2015	30 for 30 Shorts	Executive producer	
2015	30 for 30	Producer	
2015	Chasing Tyson	Director	
2015	The Mask with Henrik Lundqvist	Executive producer	
2015	Spike Lee's Lil Joints and of the Son: The Legacy of David & Jackie Robinson	Executive producer	
2016	Dancer	Director	
2017	STEP	Producer	
2018	Ballet Now	Director	
2019	Between Me and My Mind	Director	
2019	What Will Become of Us	Director	
2021	When Claude Got Shot	Producer	Won - Exceptional Merit In Documentary Filmmaking 2022
2021	Citizen Ashe	Producer	
2021	Hood River	Director/producer	
2021	Relentless	Executive producer	
2021	Twyla Moves	Director	
