= Duotone =

Superimposition of one contrasting colour halftone over another color halftone

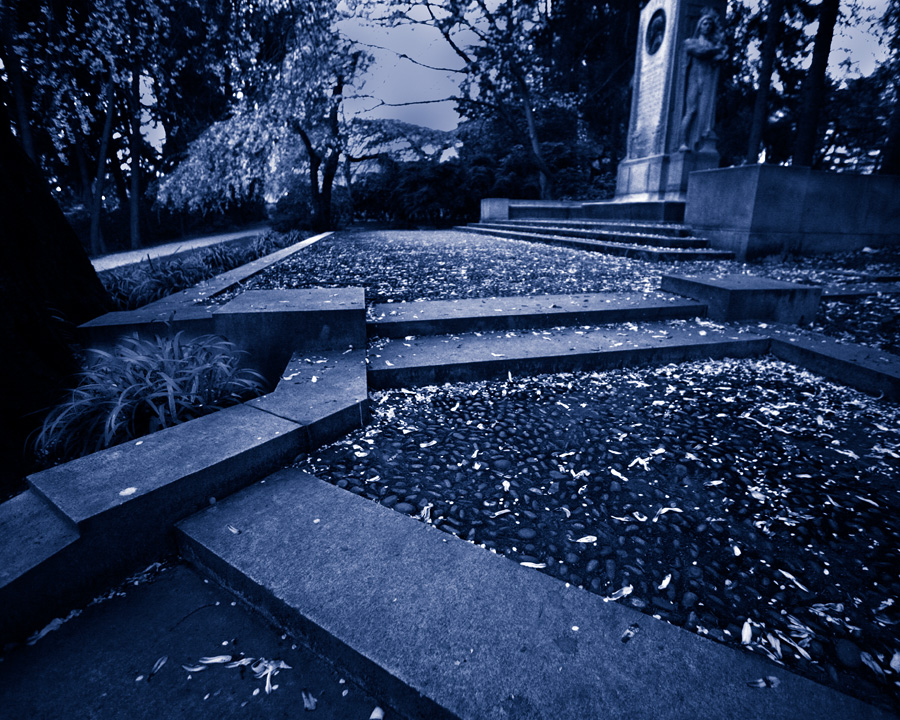
A duotone image, made using black and blue in Photoshop

Duotone (sometimes also known as Duplex) is a halftone reproduction of an image using the superimposition of one contrasting color halftone over another color halftone. This is most often used to bring out middle tones and highlights of an image. Traditionally the superimposed contrasting halftone color is black and the most commonly implemented colors are blue, yellow, brown, and red. There are, however, many varieties of color combinations used.

== Modern use ==
Due to recent advances in technology, duotones, tritones, and quadtones can be easily created using image manipulation programs. Duotone color mode in Adobe Photoshop computes the highlights and middle tones of a monochrome (grayscale or black-and-white) image in one color, and allows the user to choose any color as the second color.

== Duograph ==
A fake duotone, or duograph, is done by printing a single color with a one-color halftone over it. This process is generally not preferred over a regular duotone, as it loses much of the contrast of the image but it is easier and faster to create.

== See also ==
- Sepia tone
- Cyanotype
- Halftone
- Printmaking
- Color separation
