= List of French films of 1979 =

A list of films produced in France in 1979.

== Films ==
Title	Director	Cast	Genre	Notes
The Adolescent	Jeanne Moreau	Laetitia Chauveau, Simone Signoret, Edith Clever		
An Adventure for Two	Claude Lelouch	Jacques Dutronc, Catherine Deneuve, Jacques Villeret	Crime, romance	French-Canadian co-production
The Associate	René Gainville	Michel Serrault, Claudine Auger	Comedy	
The Bronte Sisters	André Téchiné	Isabelle Adjani, Isabelle Huppert, Marie-France Pisier		
Buffet froid	Bertrand Blier	Gérard Depardieu, Bernard Blier, Jean Carmet	Comedy	
Le cavaleur	Philippe de Broca	Jean Rochefort, Nicole Garcia, Catherine Alric	Comedy	
Collections privées	Walerian Borowczyk, Just Jaeckin, Shuji Terayama		Drama	French–Japanese co-production
Cop or Hood	Georges Lautner	Jean-Paul Belmondo, Marie Laforêt, Georges Géret	Thriller	
Coup de tête	Jean-Jacques Annaud	Patrick Dewaere, France Dougnac, Jean Bouise		
The Dogs	Alain Jessua	Victor Lanoux, Nicole Calfan, Gérard Depardieu	Horror	
Don Giovanni	Joseph Losey	Ruggero Raimondi, Kiri Te Kanawa, Edda Moser	Musical	Italian–French–West German co-production
Les Égouts du paradis	José Giovanni	Francis Huster, Jean-François Balmer, Lila Kedrova	Crime	
Et la tendresse?... Bordel!	Patrick Schulmann	Jean-Luc Bideau, Bernard Giraudeau, Evelyne Dress	Comedy	
French Fried Vacation 2	Patrice Leconte	Josiane Balasko, Michel Blanc, Marie-Anne Chazel		
Le gendarme et les extra-terrestres	Jean Girault	Louis de Funès, Michel Galabru, Maurice Risch		
La Guerre des polices	Robin Davis	Claude Brasseur, Marlène Jobert, Claude Rich		
The Hussy	Jacques Doillon	Madeleine Desdevises, Claude Hebert	Comedy-drama	
The Hypothesis of the Stolen Painting	Raúl Ruiz	Jean Rougeul, Anne Debois, Chantal Palay		
I as in Icarus	Henri Verneuil	Yves Montand, Michel Etcheverry, Pierre Vernier	Thriller	
Investigation	Étienne Périer	Victor Lanoux, Jean Carmet, Valérie Mairesse		
Jigsaw	Claude Pinoteau	Lino Ventura, Angie Dickinson, Laurent Malèt		French-Canadian co-production
Lady Oscar	Jacques Demy	Catriona MacColl, Barry Stokes, Christina Böhm		Japanese-French co-production
Laura	David Hamilton	James Mitchell, Maud Adams, Dawn Dunlap	Adult, drama	
Love on the Run	François Truffaut	Jean-Pierre Léaud, Claude Jade, Marie-France Pisier	Drama	
Lovers and Liars	Mario Monicelli	Goldie Hawn, Giancarlo Giannini, Claudine Auger	Romance	Italian–French co-production
The Medic	Pierre Granier-Deferre	Véronique Jannot, Bernard Giraudeau, Alain Delon	Drama	
Memoirs of a French Whore	Daniel Duval	Miou-Miou, Maria Schneider, Daniel Duval	Comedy-drama	
Les Mors aux dents	Laurent Heynemann	Jacques Dutronc, Michel PIccoli, Michel Galabru		
Moonraker	Lewis Gilbert	Roger Moore, Lois Chiles, Michel Lonsdale	Action	British–French–American co-production
Nosferatu the Vampyre	Werner Herzog	Klaus Kinski, Isabelle Adjani, Bruno Ganz	Horror	West German–French co-production
Le Piège à cons	Jean-Pierre Mocky	Jean-Pierre Mocky, Catherine Leprince, Bruno Netter		
The Red Sweater	Michel Drach	Serge Avédikian, Michelle Marquais, Clarie Deluca		
Série noire	Alain Corneau	Patrick Dewaere, Myriam Boyer, Bernard Blier	Crime	
Short Memory	Eduardo de Gregorio	Nathalie Baye, Philippe Léotard, Bulle Ogier		French-Belgian co-production
Tess	Roman Polanski	Nastassja Kinski, Leigh Lawson, Peter Firth	Drama	French–British co-production
The Tin Drum	Volker Schlöndorff	David Bennent, Mario Adorf, Angela Winkler		West German–French co-production
Womanlight	Costa-Gavras	Yves Montand, Romy Schneider, Romollo Valli	Drama	French–Italian–West German co-production

== See also ==
- 1979 in France

== Notes ==
=== References ===
- Galbraith IV, Stuart (2008). The Toho Studios Story: A History and Complete Filmography. Scarecrow Press. ISBN 978-1461673743.
