= Fine-art nude photography =

Artistic photography of the naked human body

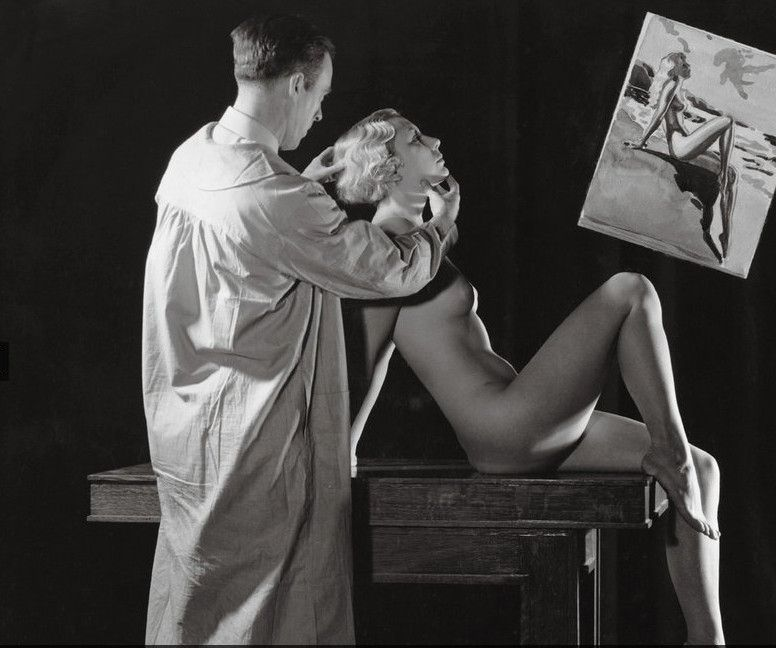
Photographer Earl Moran working with model Zoë Mozert in the 1930s.

Fine-art nude photography is a genre of fine-art photography which depicts the nude human body with an emphasis on form, composition, emotional content, and other aesthetic qualities. The nude has been a prominent subject of photography since its invention, and played an important role in establishing photography as a fine art medium. The distinction between fine art photography and other subgenres is not absolute, but there are certain defining characteristics.

Erotic interest, although often present, is secondary, which distinguishes art photography from both glamour photography, which focuses on showing the subject of the photograph in the most attractive way, and pornographic photography, which has the primary purpose of sexually arousing the viewer. Fine art photographs are also not taken to serve any journalistic, scientific, or other practical purpose. The distinction between these is not always clear, and photographers, as with other artists, tend to make their own case in characterizing their work, though the viewer may have a different assessment.

The nude remains a controversial subject in all media, but more so with photography due to its inherent realism. The male nude has been less common than the female, and more rarely exhibited or published. The use of children as subjects in nude photography is especially controversial.

== History ==
=== 19th century ===
Photography and the Traditional Arts
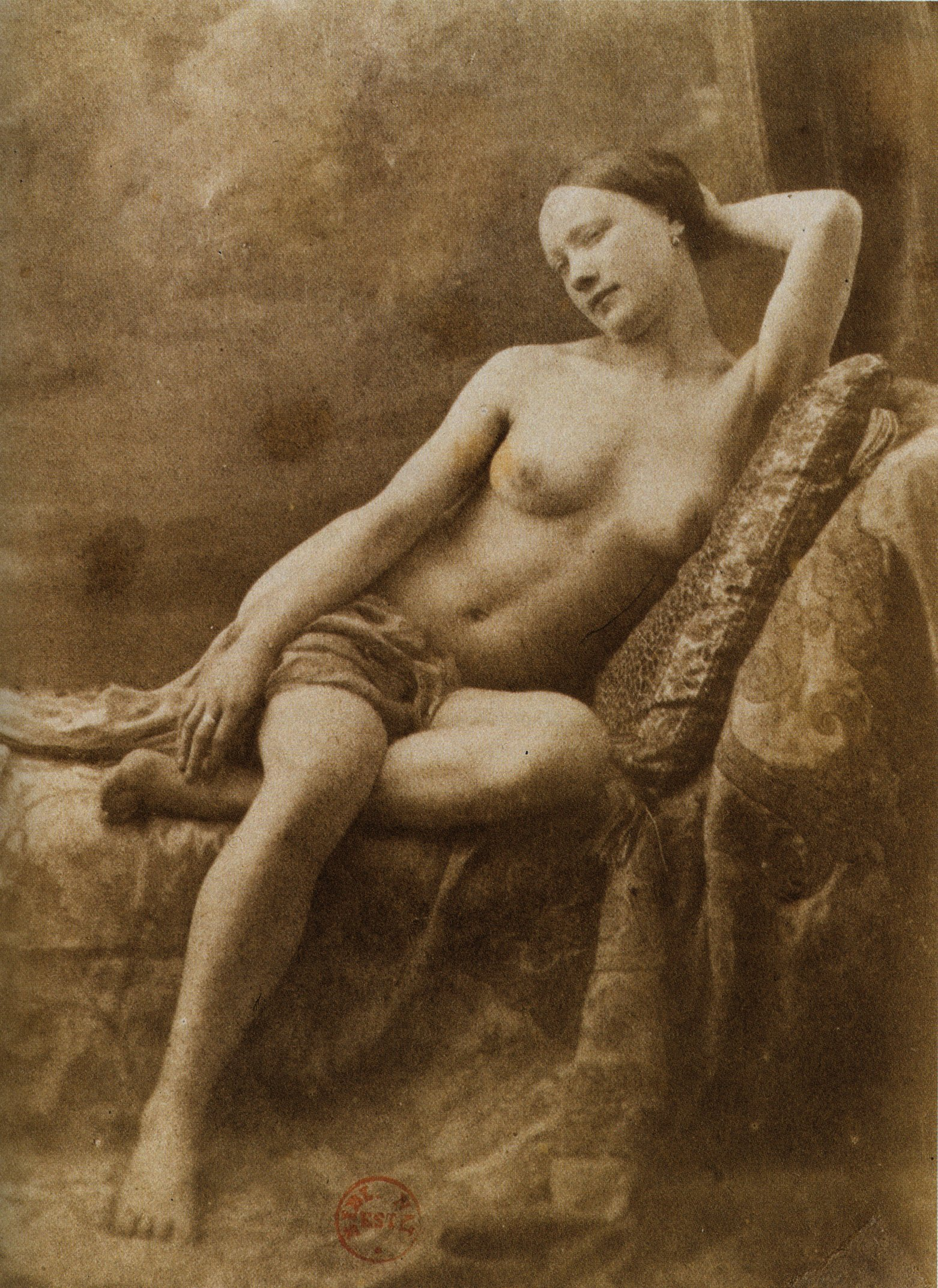
Photograph by Jean Louis Marie Eugène Durieu, part of a series made with Eugène Delacroix

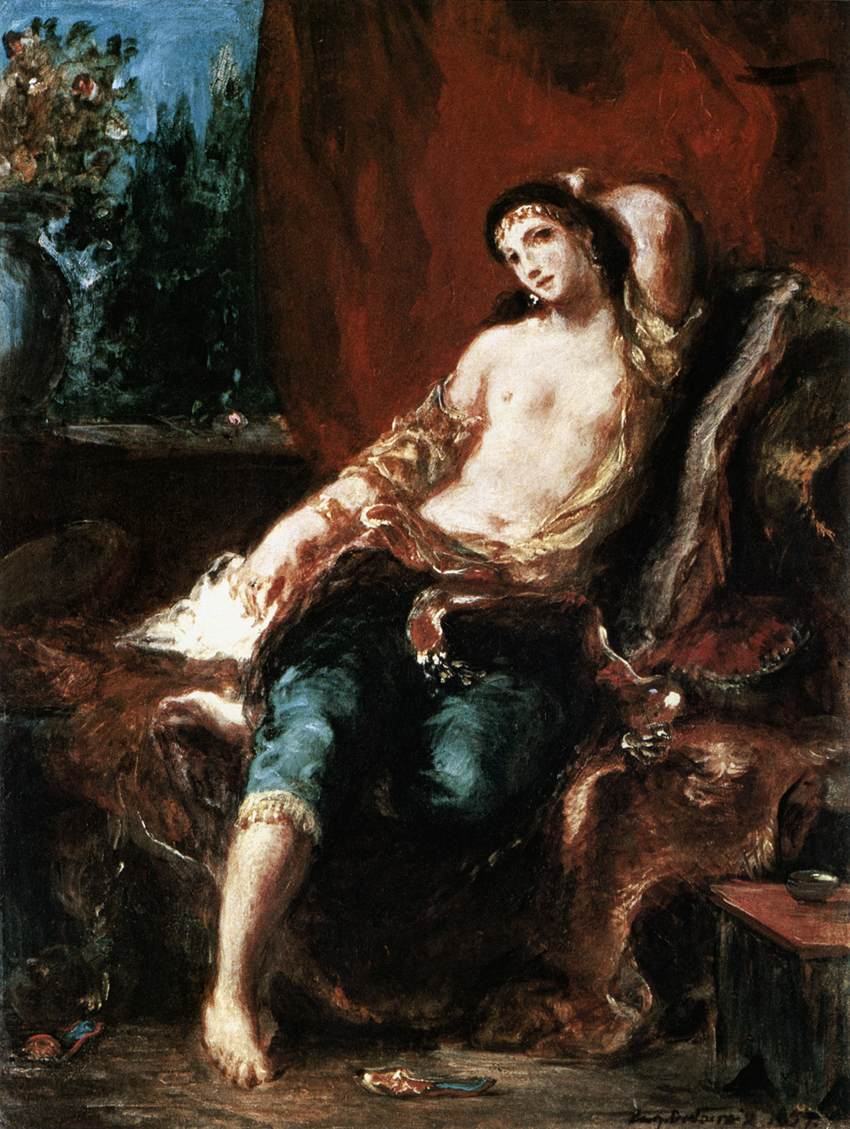
Odalisque (1857) by Eugène Delacroix (Oil on panel), a painting with similar pose

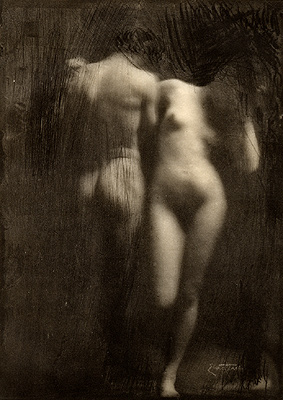
Adam and Eve by Frank Eugene, taken 1898, published in Camera Work no. 30, 1910

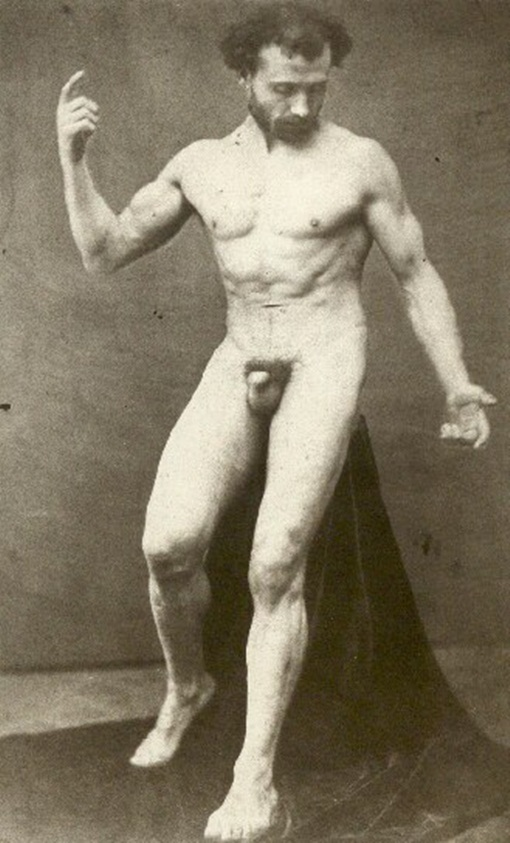
Nude by Gaudenzio Marconi, 1841–1885

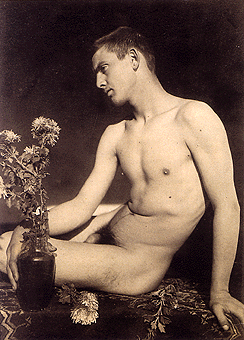
Guglielmo Plüschow – Nude male sitting on a rug. Rome, 1896/1907

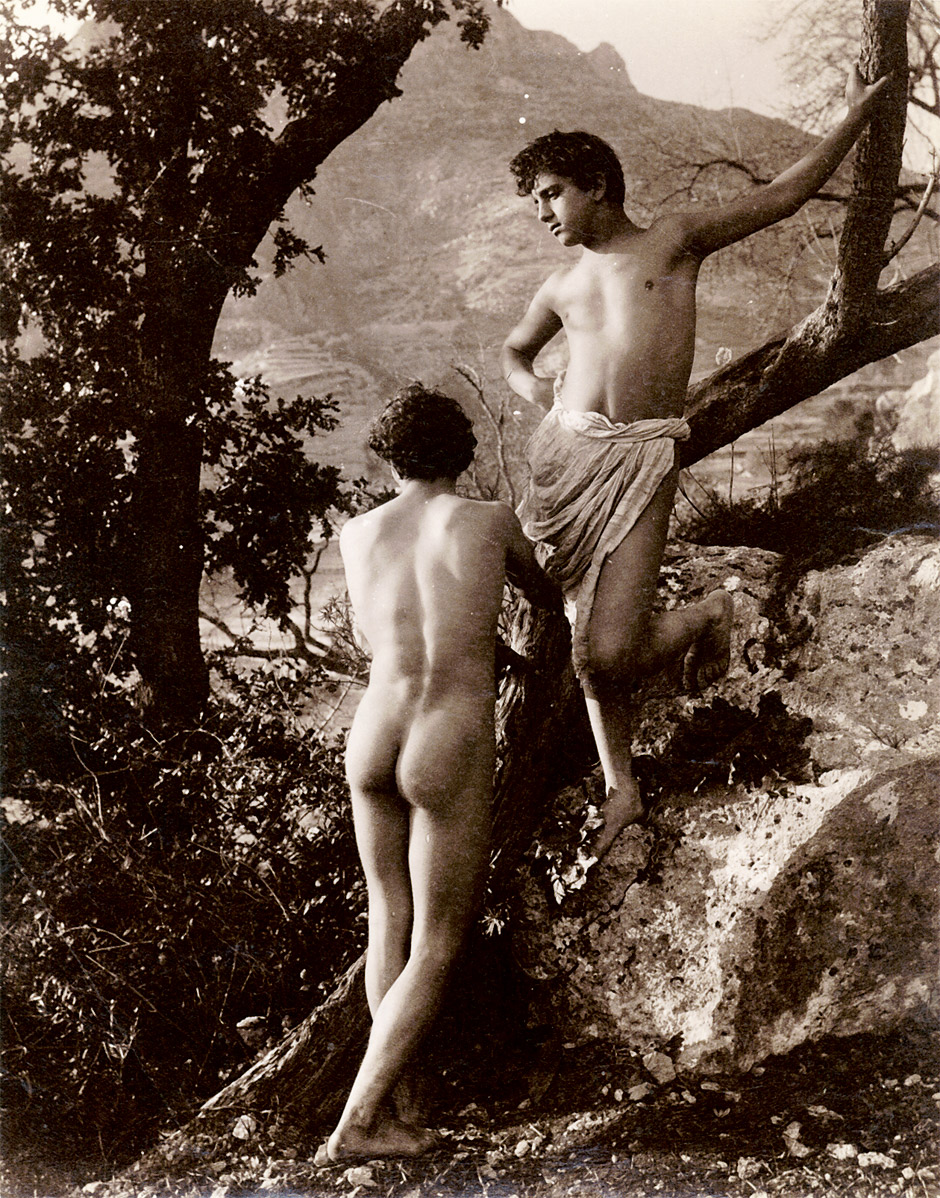
Wilhelm von Gloeden, Two male nudes outdoors c. 1900

Those early photographers in Western cultures who sought to establish photography as a fine art medium, frequently chose women as the subjects for their nude photographs, in poses that accorded with traditional nudes in other media. Before nude photography, art nudes usually used allusions to classical antiquity; gods and warriors, goddesses and nymphs. Depictions of male and female nudes in traditional art mediums had been mostly limited to portrayals as an ideal warrior or athlete (for men) or that emphasized divinity and reproduction (for women), and early photographic art first engaged these archetypes as well. Poses, lighting, soft focus, vignetting and hand retouching were employed to create photographic images that rose to the level of art comparable to the other arts at that time. The main limitation was that early photographs were monochrome. Although 19th century artists in other media often used photographs as substitutes for live models, the best of these photographs were also intended as works of art in their own right.

Nude photography was more controversial than painted nude works, and to avoid censorship some early nude photographs were described as "studies for artists", while others were used as references by artists to do drawings and paintings as a supplement to live models. Eugène Delacroix was an early adopter of the practice of using photographs taken specifically for him by his friend, Eugène Durieu. Edgar Degas made his own photographs that he used for painting references. Thomas Eakins used photography for studies of several of his paintings, The Swimming Hole being an example.

=== Modern ===
Modern photography
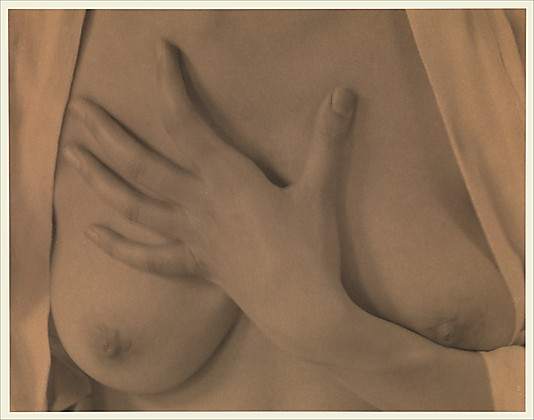
Georgia O’Keeffe, Hands and Breasts (1919) by Alfred Stieglitz

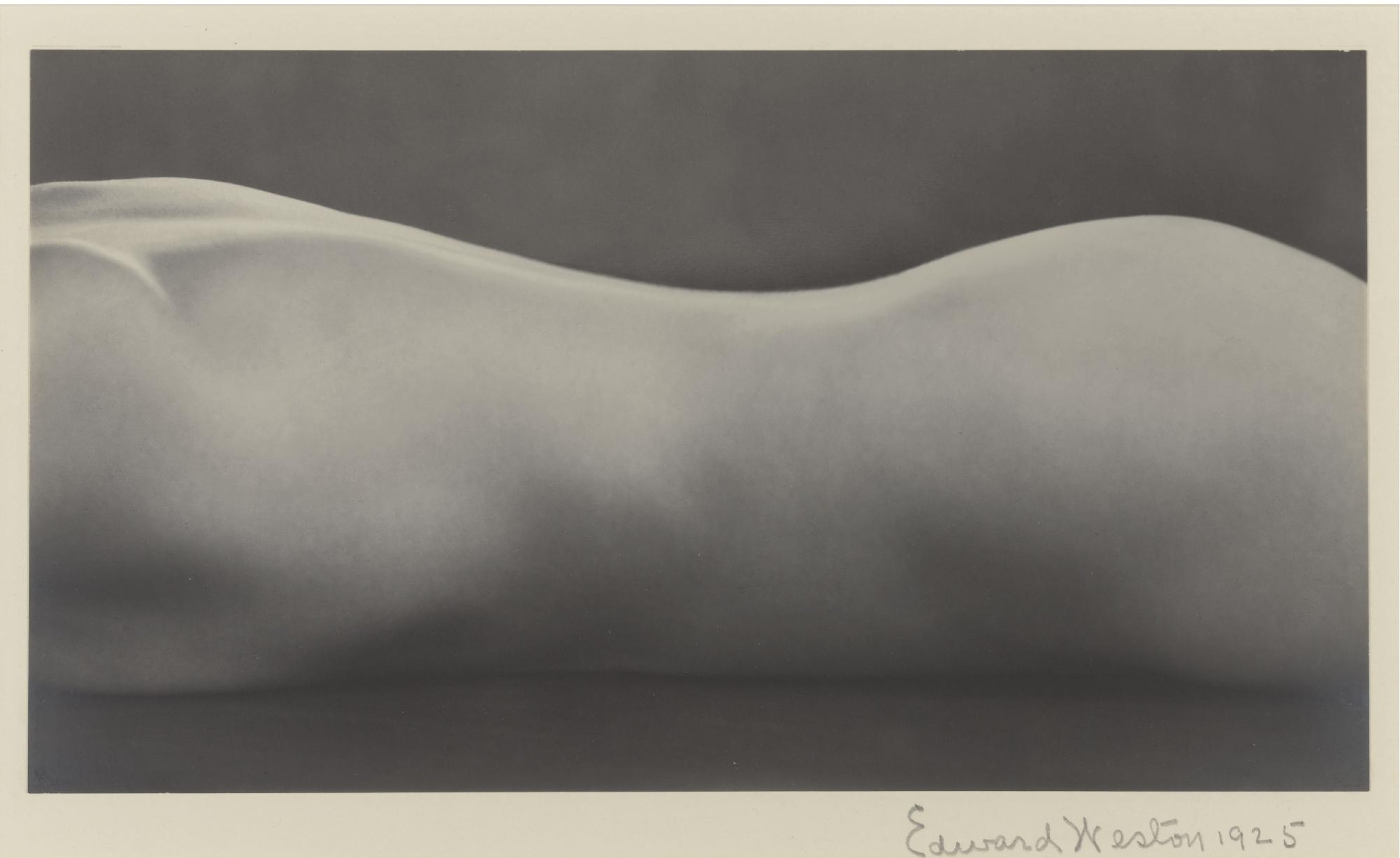
"Nude" (1925) by Edward Weston

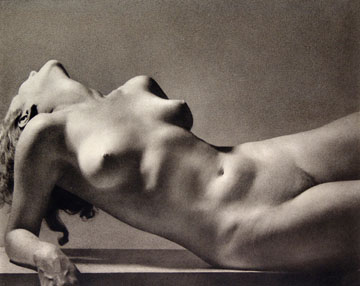
Nude study (c. 1935) by William Mortensen

As fine art photography first embraced and then moved past classical allegorical imagery, both male and female photographers began to use the male nude as another medium to examine issues of representation and identity, sexuality and voyeurism.

Photographing nudes (and particularly male nudes) became a way for women artists to engage the subject of "the nude" from the position of power traditionally reserved for male artists; alternatively, nude self-portraiture allowed men to begin to re-evaluate accepted definitions of sensuality and masculinity by photographing themselves.

==== Alfred Stieglitz ====
Alfred Stieglitz is a major figure in bringing modern art to America by exhibiting the new genre of art in his New York galleries at the beginning of the 20th century. He is known to the public perhaps more for his relationship with Georgia O'Keeffe, whose nude photos he exhibited in 1921 while married to someone else. "Stieglitz used the camera as a kind of mirror. 'My photographs,' he wrote in 1925, 'are ever born of an inner need—an Experience of Spirit. I do not make pictures . . . I have a vision of life and I try to find equivalents for it sometimes in the form of photographs.' Often he would write of true seeing and of inness. As O'Keeffe noted rightly, the man she knew so well was 'always photographing himself.'"

==== Imogen Cunningham ====
Imogen Cunningham began taking photographs in Seattle in 1905, in the soft-focused pictorialist style popular at that time; but she is best known for the sharp-focused modern style she developed later. She is also attributed as the first woman photographer to take a nude photo of a man (her husband, Roi Partridge). In the work of Judy Dater, one particular photo, Imogen and Twinka, became one of the most recognizable images caught by an American photographer. It features a 91-year-old Imogen Cunningham and a nude Twinka Thiebaud. The photo was the first adult full frontal nude photograph published in Life magazine, in 1976.

==== Man Ray ====
After World War I, avant-garde photographers became more experimental in their portrayal of nudity, using reflective distortions and printing techniques to create abstractions or depicting real life rather than classical allusions.

Beginning in the late 1920s Man Ray experimented with the Sabattier, or solarization process, a technique that won him critical esteem, especially from the Surrealists. Many of the central figures of Surrealism—Breton, Magritte, Dalí—followed his example in using photography in addition to other media. Other photographers, such as Maurice Tabard and Raoul Ubac, were directly inspired by Man Ray's techniques, while photographers such as André Kertész and Brassaï were indirectly influenced by his innovative approach to the medium.

==== Edward Weston ====
Edward Weston evolved a particularly American aesthetic, using a large format camera to capture images of nature and landscapes as well as nudes, establishing photography as a fine arts medium. In 1937 Weston became the first photographer to be awarded a John Simon Guggenheim Memorial Fellowship. For a famous example of Weston's work see: Charis Wilson.

==== Bill Brandt ====
Bill Brandt is best known for a series of nudes, developed primarily between 1945 and 1961, that reflect his personal vision. Brandt's work was varied not only in the range of his subjects, but also in his printing style, which changed throughout his career. This exhibition was the first to trace that evolution.

==== Diane Arbus ====
Many fine art photographers have a variety of subjects in their work, the nude being one. Diane Arbus was attracted to unusual people in unusual settings, including a nudist camp. Lee Friedlander had more conventional subjects, one being Madonna as a young model.

=== Contemporary ===
Contemporary photography
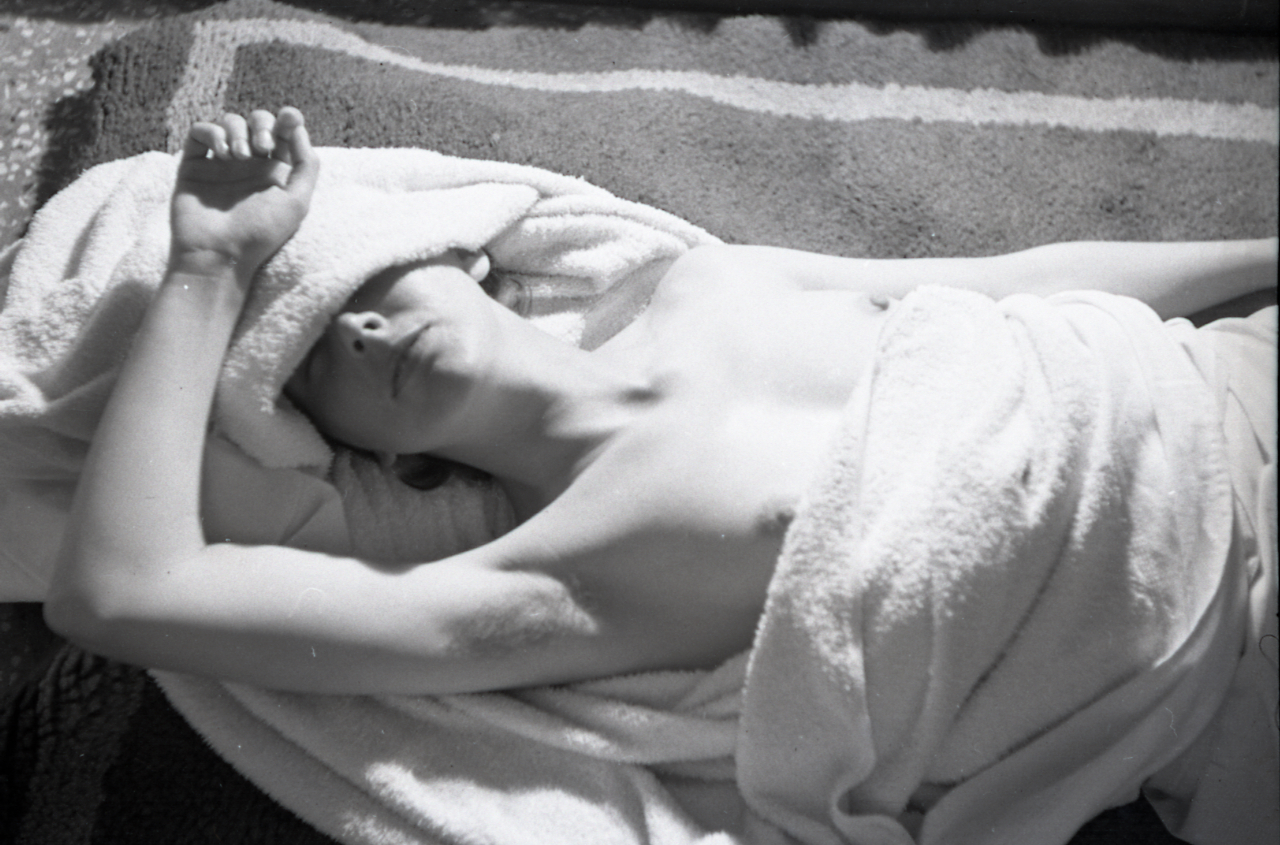
Nude woman (1970) by Paolo Monti

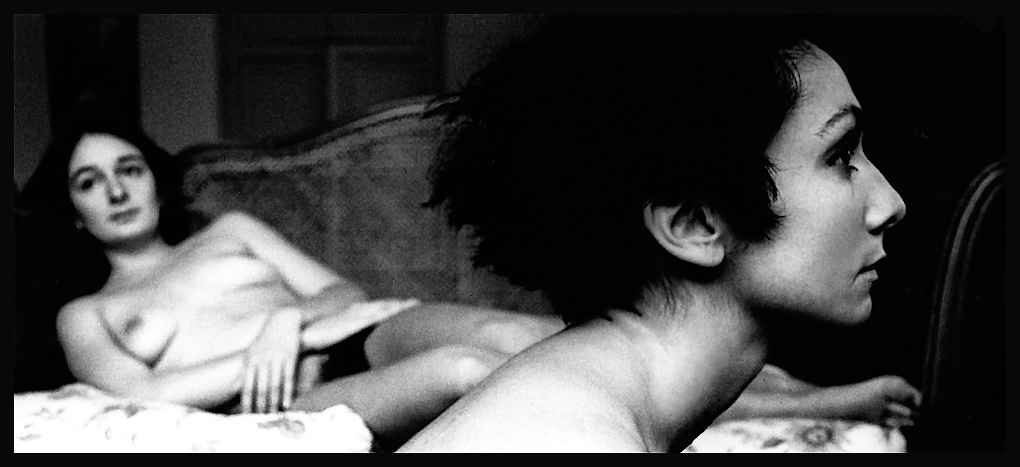
Nudes (1980) by Augusto De Luca

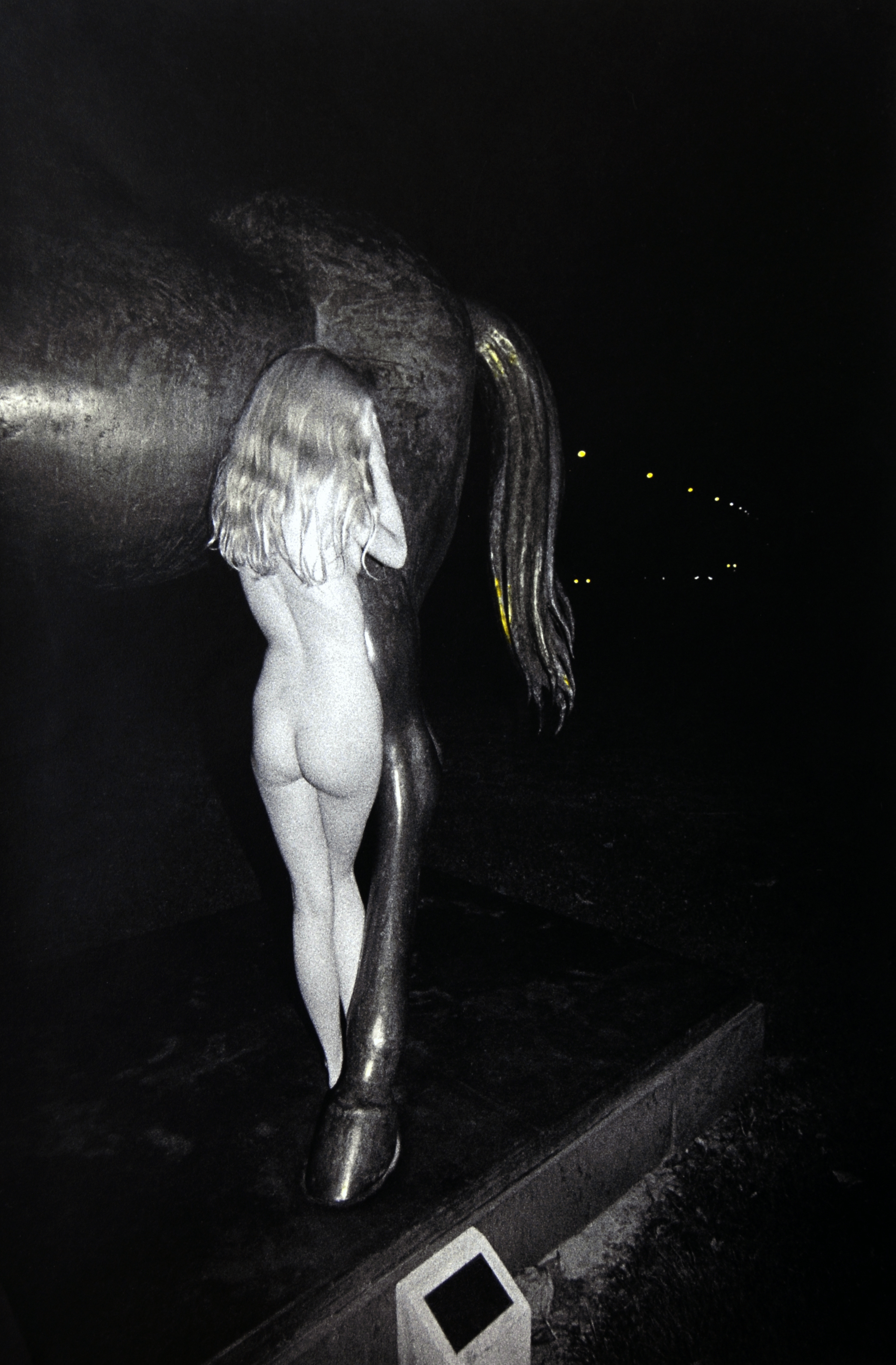
Equus 1989 by Sergio Valle Duarte

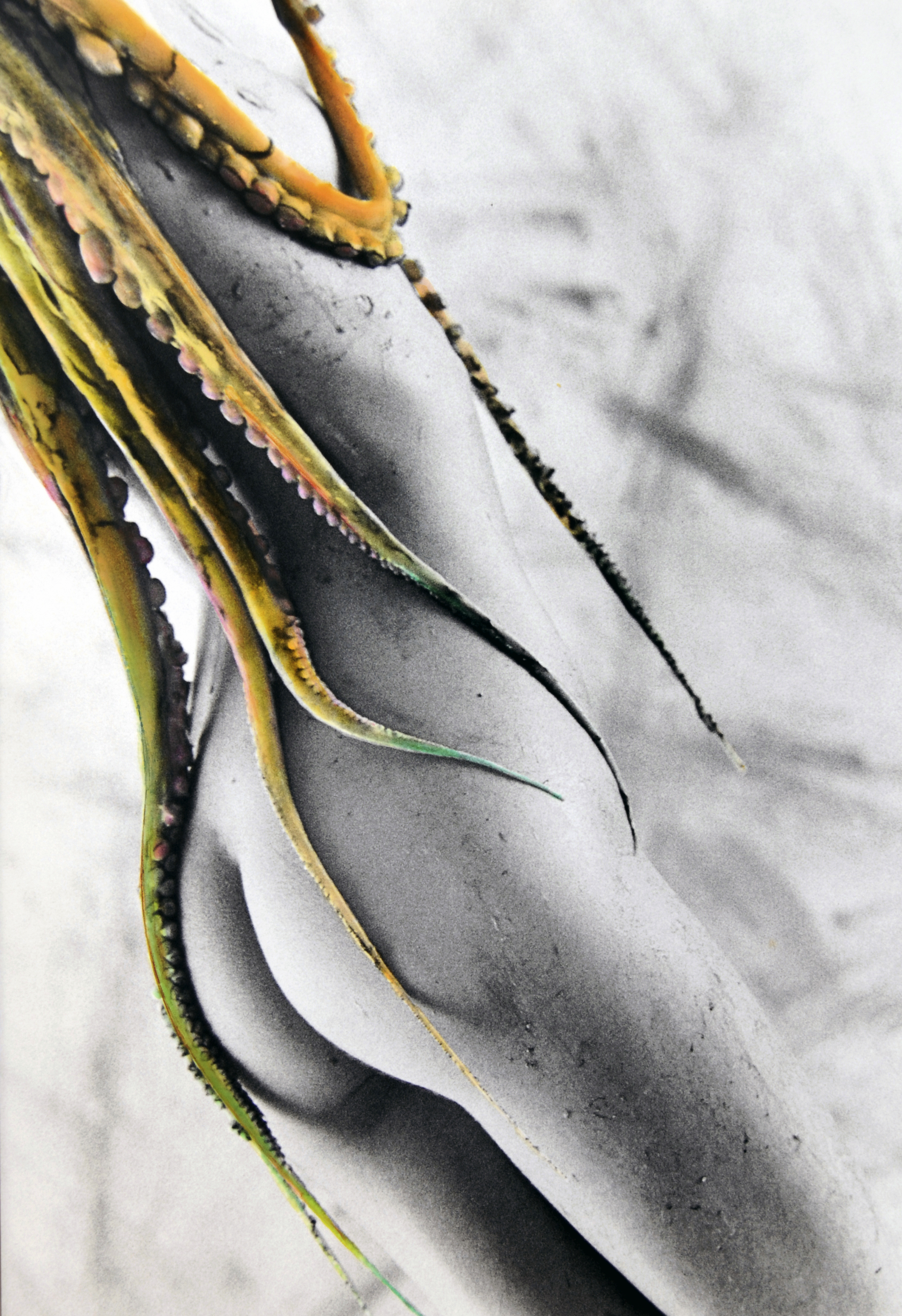
Re-reading of The Dream of the Fisherman's Wife 1988, by Sergio Valle Duarte

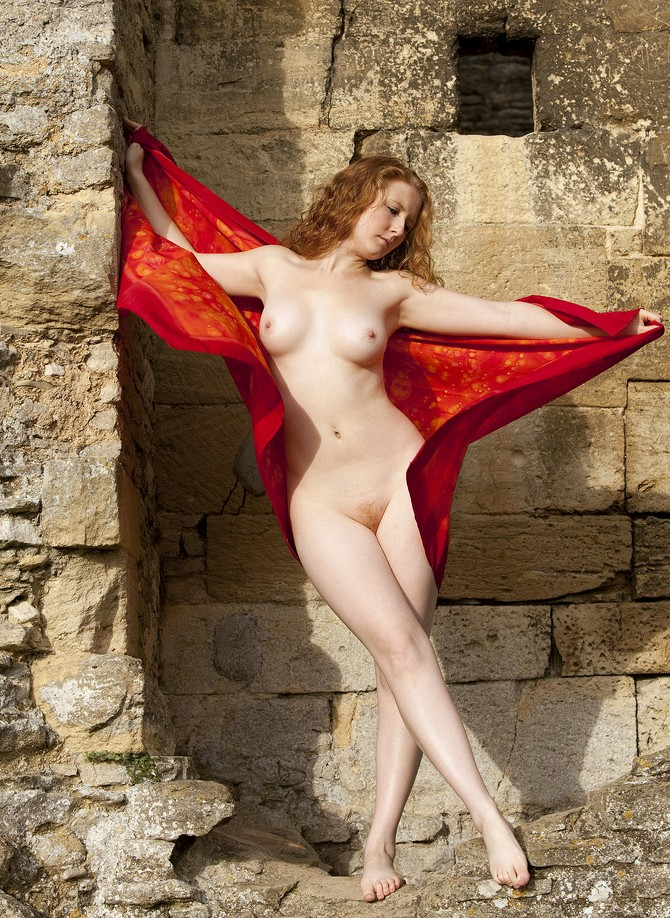
Nude redhead with red scarf, Oxfordshire (2009) by Derek Thomas.

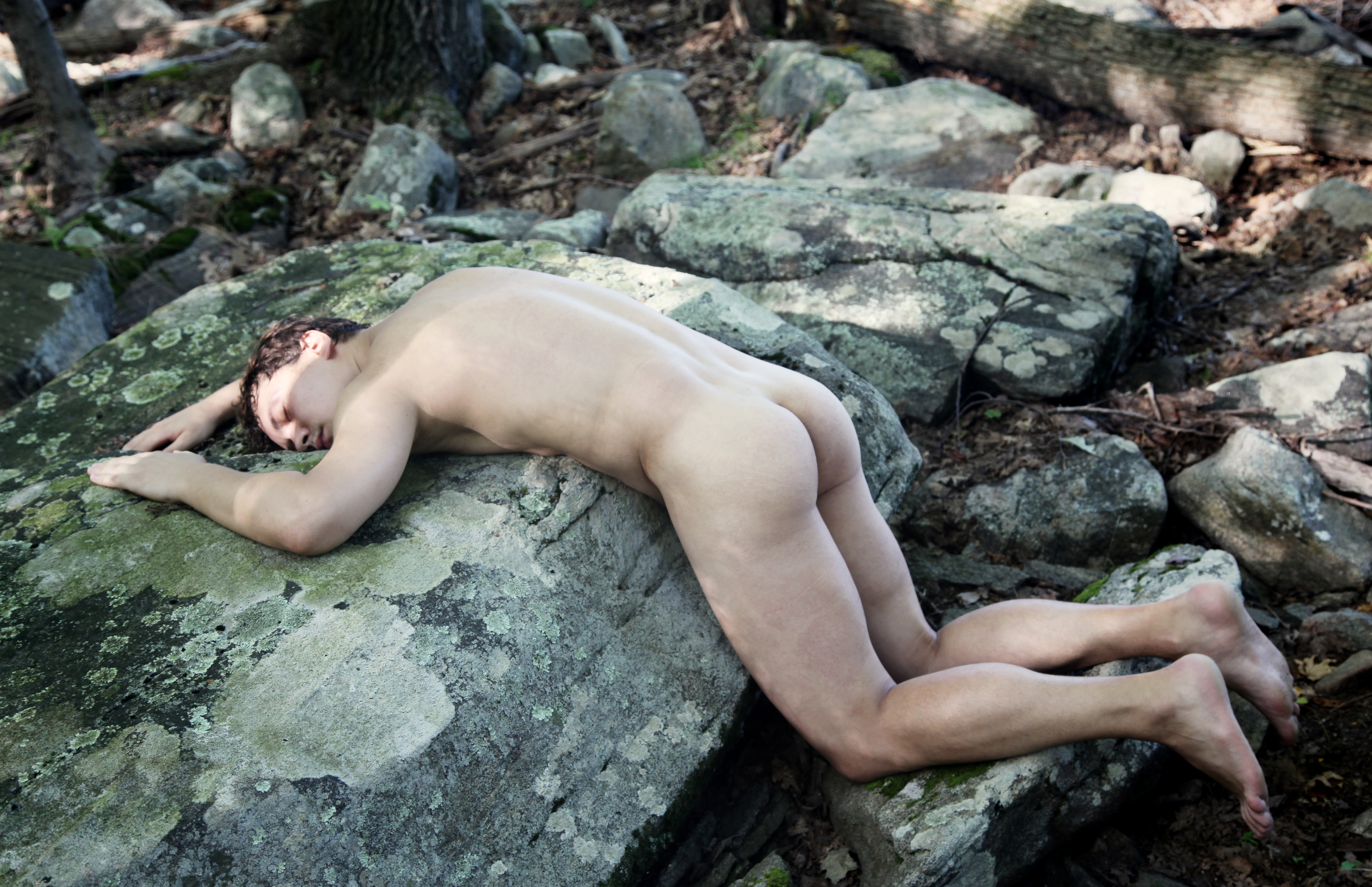
Kargaltsev posed nude on rocks (2012) by Alexander Kargaltsev.

The distinction between fine art and glamour is often one of marketing, with fine art being sold through galleries or dealers in limited editions signed by the artist, and glamour photos being distributed through mass media.

For some, the difference is in the gaze of the model, with glamour models looking into the camera, while art models do not.

Glamour and fashion photographers have aspired to fine art status in some of their work. One of the first was Irving Penn, who progressed from Vogue magazine to photographing fashion models such as Kate Moss nude. Richard Avedon, Helmut Newton and Annie Leibovitz have followed a similar path with portraits of the famous, many of them nude. or partially clothed. In the post-modern era, where fame is often the subject of fine art, Avedon's photo of Nastassja Kinski with a python, and Leibovitz's magazine covers of Demi Moore pregnant and in body paint, have become iconic. The work of Joyce Tenneson has gone the other way, from fine art with a unique, soft-focus style showing woman at all stages of life to portraiture of famous people and fashion photography.

Although nude photographers have largely worked within established forms that show bodies as sculptural abstractions, some, such as Robert Mapplethorpe, have created works that deliberately blur the boundaries between erotica and art.

== Issues ==
=== Public perception ===
At the beginning of the 21st century, it has become difficult to make an artistic statement in nude photography, given the proliferation of non-artistic and pornographic images which taints the subject in the perception of most viewers, limiting the opportunities to exhibit or publish the images. When they appear in mainstream consumer magazines such as Popular Photography, PC Photo, and Shutterbug; the editors receive sufficient negative response that they tend to reject the work of serious nude-image photographers.

=== Children as subjects ===
Several photographers have become controversial because of their nude photographs of underage subjects.

David Hamilton's works often featured children and adolescents in a partially or fully nude boudoir style in books such as The Age of Innocence, which caused controversy in both the US and the UK.

Jock Sturges celebrates the beauty of people in naturist settings and states that his work is not exploitative; however in 1990 the FBI raided his studio and made charges that were later dismissed. However, due to the local nature of US laws on the issue, books of both Hamilton's and Sturges' photos have been ruled obscene in the states of Alabama, South Carolina, and Colorado.

Sally Mann was raised in rural Virginia, in a locale where skinny-dipping in a river was common, resulting in some of her most famous photographs being of her own children swimming or playing in the nude. Mary Gordon characterized many of Mann's images as sexualizing children regardless of artistic merit.

In May 2008, police in Sydney, Australia, raided an exhibition by the photographer Bill Henson featuring images of naked children on allegations of child pornography. In June 2008, it was reported in The Age that police would have no basis to prosecute Henson over his photographs of naked teenagers, after they were declared "mild and justified" and given a PG rating by the Australian Classification Board, suggesting viewing by children under the age of 16 is suitable with parental guidance.

Also in 2008, Art Monthly Australia published a nude image of the 6-year-old Olympia Nelson taken by her mother, Polixeni Papapetrou. According to the then-11-year-old Olympia, she did not believe the photograph amounted to abuse and was upset with Prime Minister Kevin Rudd's remark that he hated it. Olympia's father, Professor Robert Nelson, defended the image, saying: "It has nothing to do with pedophilia. The connection between artistic pictures and pedophilia cannot be made and there is no evidence for it."

Other less well-known photographers have been charged (but not convicted) for photos of their own children.

Fine-art nude photography of youth
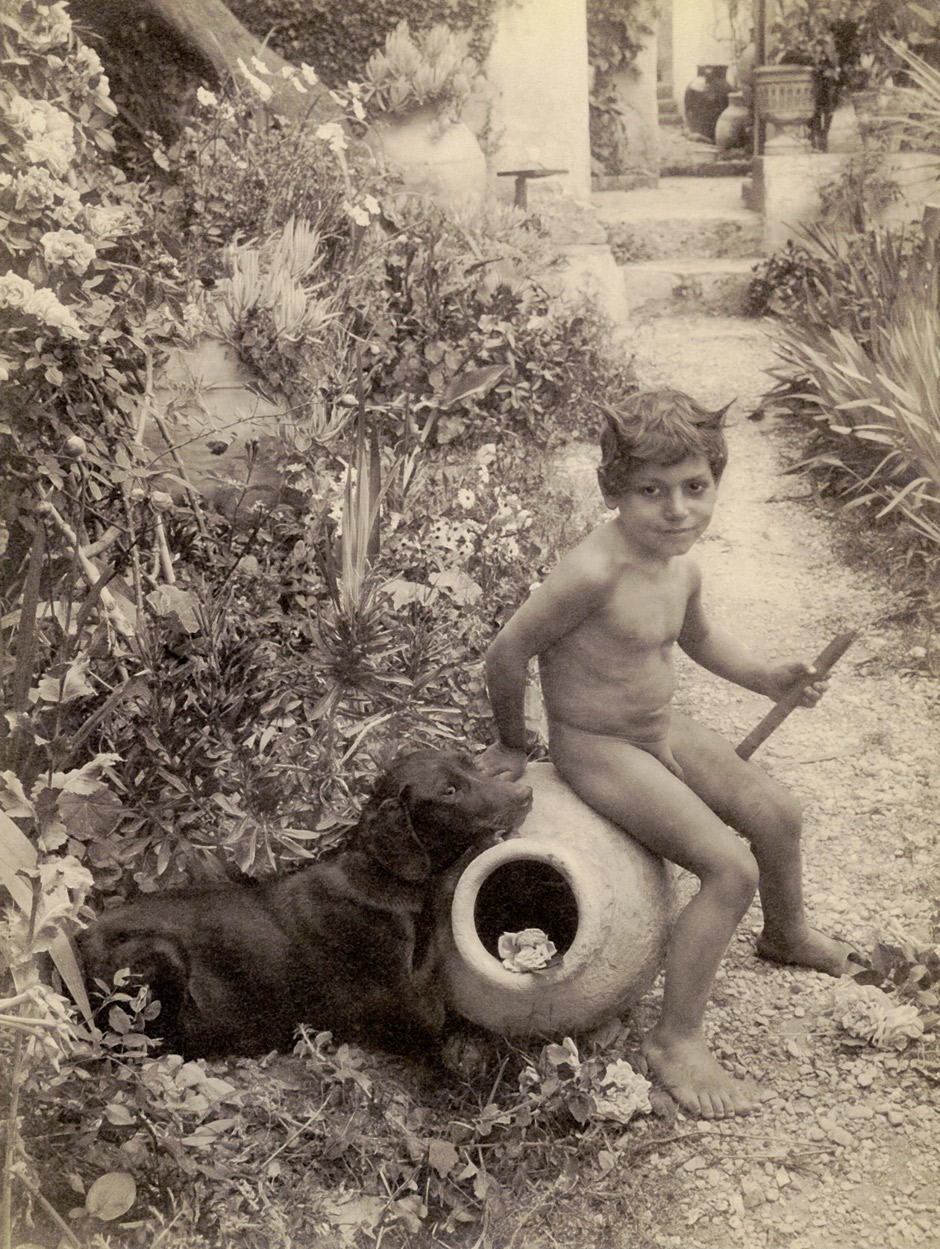
"Nude boy and dog in garden" by Wilhelm von Gloeden, a photographer known for homoerotic nude photographs of boys (c. 1900)

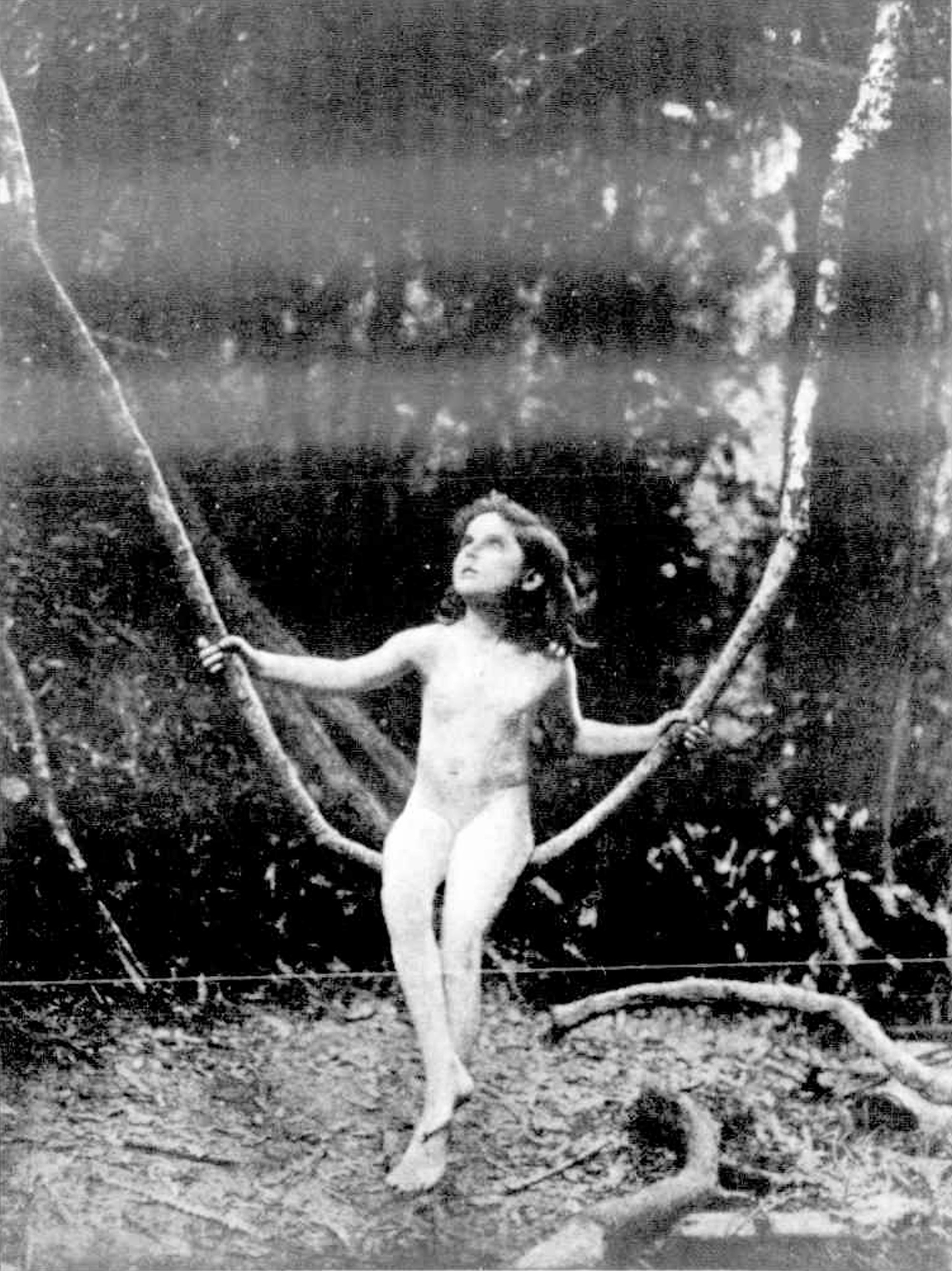
"Nymph of the Forest," a photograph from The Australasian (1901)

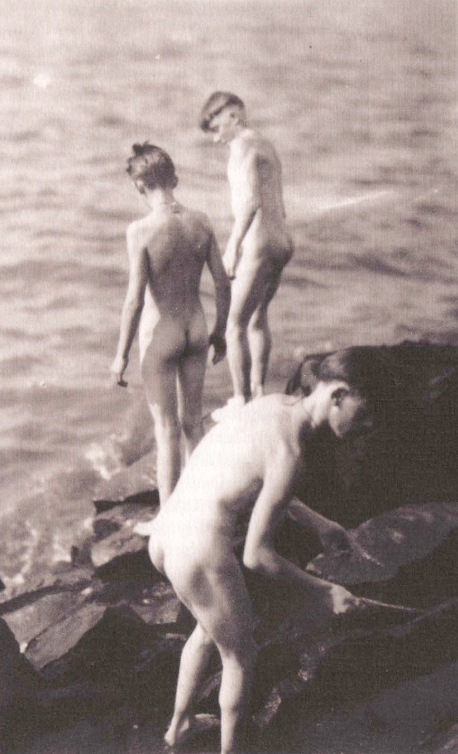
Lads O' the Sun by Edward Slocum (1924)

=== Body image ===
Body image has become a topic explored by many photographers working with models whose bodies do not conform to conventional prejudices about beauty.

Leonard Nimoy, after many years photographing conventionally beautiful professional models, realized that he was not capturing individual personalities, so he created a series with women interested in "Fat Liberation".

Sally Mann's more recent nudes have been of her husband, whose body shows the effects of muscular dystrophy.

=== Erotic art ===
Many contemporary artists push the boundaries by having work with both aesthetic qualities and explicit sexuality. Late in his life Robert Mapplethorpe created work that was controversial in part by being on display in Washington, DC in a gallery receiving public funds. When a Mapplethorpe retrospective opened at the Cincinnati Contemporary Arts Center in 1990, Dennis Barrie became the first American museum director to be criminally prosecuted for the contents of an exhibition. Although explicit photos were placed in a separate room with a content warning, Barrie was charged with "pandering obscenity" and showing minors in a state of nudity, but a jury acquitted Barrie and the Arts Center of all charges.

== See also ==
- Depictions of nudity
