= Anja Schüte =

German actress (born 1964)

Anja Schüte (born 2 September 1964) is a German actress. Her acting career was launched through softcore erotica director David Hamilton, but she later became primarily known for her numerous German television roles.

== Biography ==
Schüte grew up in Cologne. After completing schooling in the Liblar district of Erftstadt, she took private acting lessons. Her first film role was as an uncredited ballet dancer in the 1979 French erotic film Laura directed by David Hamilton. Her proper film debut was a lead role in Hamilton's 1980 Tendres Cousines. By 1986 she had appeared in nine movies.

Later, Schüte became known primarily for roles on television shows, including her television breakthrough role in Der Trotzkopf (1983), Die Wicherts von nebenan (1986–91), Forsthaus Falkenau (2003–06), and Der Fürst und das Mädchen (2007). She also appeared in many German-language television movies. She also competed in the third season of Promi Big Brother in 2015.

Her personal life is the subject of German celebrity press coverage. From 1990 to 1995, she was married to Schlager singer Roland Kaiser, and had a son. in 2009 she ended a long relationship with architect Hans Schwemer. She was later in a relationship with hotelier Jörg Brunkhorst. In 2019, she married a Norwegian shipping executive, and they live together in Oslo.
