= Premiers désirs =

First Desires
- Directed by: David Hamilton
- Written by: Michael Erdmann; Phillippe Gautier; Bertrand Levergeois
- Produced by: Alain Terzian
- Starring: Emmanuelle Béart
- Cinematography: Alain Derobe
- Edited by: Francois Zeppi
- Music by: Phillippe Sarde
- Release date: 1984
- Running time: 93 minutes
- Country: France
- Languages: French, German

First Desires or Premier Desirs (original French title) is a 1984 French/West German film and the last film directed by photographer David Hamilton.

== Summary ==
An erotic film from photographer David Hamilton. Three young girls come of age on a remote Mediterranean island after they are shipwrecked. Each girl follows her own path; whether it be with local boys, the husband of a beautiful pianist, or another woman.

== Availability ==
This film is available on DVD in the UK. In 2012 it was released on the Criterion Collection's Hulu channel.

== Stills ==
Many images from the film First Desires appear in Hamilton's collections, including Twenty Five Years of an Artist.
