= Peggy Duff =

British political activist (1910–1981)

- Born: Margaret Doreen Eames; 8 February 1910
- Died: 16 April 1981 (aged 71); London, United Kingdom
- Education: Bedford College, University of London
- Occupations: Journalist, activist
- Known for: Organiser of the Campaign for Nuclear Disarmament (CND)
- Children: 3 incl. Euan Duff

Peggy Duff (8 February 1910 – 16 April 1981) was a British political activist who started off her career with a protest against the treatment of German prisoners of war in Britain after the Second World War. She was principally known for her contribution to the peace movement as the organiser of the Campaign for Nuclear Disarmament. Duff was described by Noam Chomsky, a friend of hers, as "one of the people who really changed modern history".

== Background ==
Duff was born as Margaret Doreen Eames in Chiswick, Middlesex. She was the elder daughter and middle child of Frank Eames, a stockbroker's clerk, and Evelyn Rose Eames (née Pitman. From 1921, she attended Hastings Secondary School for Girls; in a 1929 reference by the school's headmistress described her as being "very public-spirited". She then went to Bedford College, University of London, where she read English. After university she worked as a journalist and in 1933 married Bill Duff, a fellow journalist. He was killed during the Second World War while covering an American air raid on the Burma railway for an armed forces' newspaper. The couple had two daughters and a son (photo-journalist Euan Duff).

== Political activism ==
Duff began her involvement in peace campaigning in the late 1930s. During the Second World War, she joined Common Wealth, an idealistic socialist party to the left of Labour, which had been set up by Sir Richard Acland. After the 1945 election, in which Common Wealth ceded its vote to the Labour Party, Duff was employed by Victor Gollancz's organization Save Europe Now, which sent food and clothing to occupied Germany and Austria from rationed Britain, and campaigned for the repatriation of prisoners of war. From 1949 to 1955 she was business manager of Tribune newspaper, then identified with the supporters of Labour MP Aneurin Bevan.

Briefly working with Gollancz again, Duff became the secretary of the National Campaign for the Abolition of Capital Punishment, set up in August 1955, in part as a response to a number of controversial executions (including that of Ruth Ellis). In 1956, she was elected as a Labour member of St Pancras Borough Council, on which she became Chief Whip for the Labour group. Duff was a councillor on Camden London Borough Council, for the Camden ward, from 1964 until 1968. She also supported the rights of tenants of council housing, but in doing so gave the green light to controversial architectural redevelopments and slum clearance programmes that are often considered to have blighted the ward she served.

== Campaign for Nuclear Disarmament ==
At the Labour Party Conference in 1957, Aneurin Bevan, then Shadow Foreign Secretary, astonished his supporters by denouncing demands for unilateral nuclear disarmament. In November that year, Duff responded by joining with others to establish the Campaign for Nuclear Disarmament (CND), which aimed to persuade Britain to "renounce unconditionally the use or production of nuclear weapons and refuse to allow their use by others in her defence". Duff became the Organising Secretary for the campaign, and her energy and resilience became well known to its supporters. Canon John Collins, Chair of CND, noted that she never gave the impression of efficiency "and seemed thoroughly slapdash", but that her work had impressive results. She organised the second and subsequent Aldermaston Marches from 1959 to 1963.

== Later life and death ==
In 1965, Duff commenced work for the International Confederation for Disarmament and Peace, resigning as General Secretary of CND in 1967. She resigned from the Labour Party on 10 May that year over Prime Minister Harold Wilson's diplomatic support for the United States in the Vietnam War and refusal to condemn the Greek dictatorship of "the Colonels". She subsequently wrote her memoirs, Left, Left, Left (Allison & Busby, 1971). Duff also edited and wrote part of War or Peace in the Middle East? (1978), in which she argued for "no more blank cheques for Israel". She died of breast cancer in University College Hospital, aged 71, and was buried at Hampstead Cemetery.

== Legacy ==
Noam Chomsky called Duff "one of those heroes who is completely unknown, because she did too much," and stated that "she should have won the Nobel Peace Prize about twenty times." He described her as a "leading figure", in both the CND and the anti-Vietnam War movement.

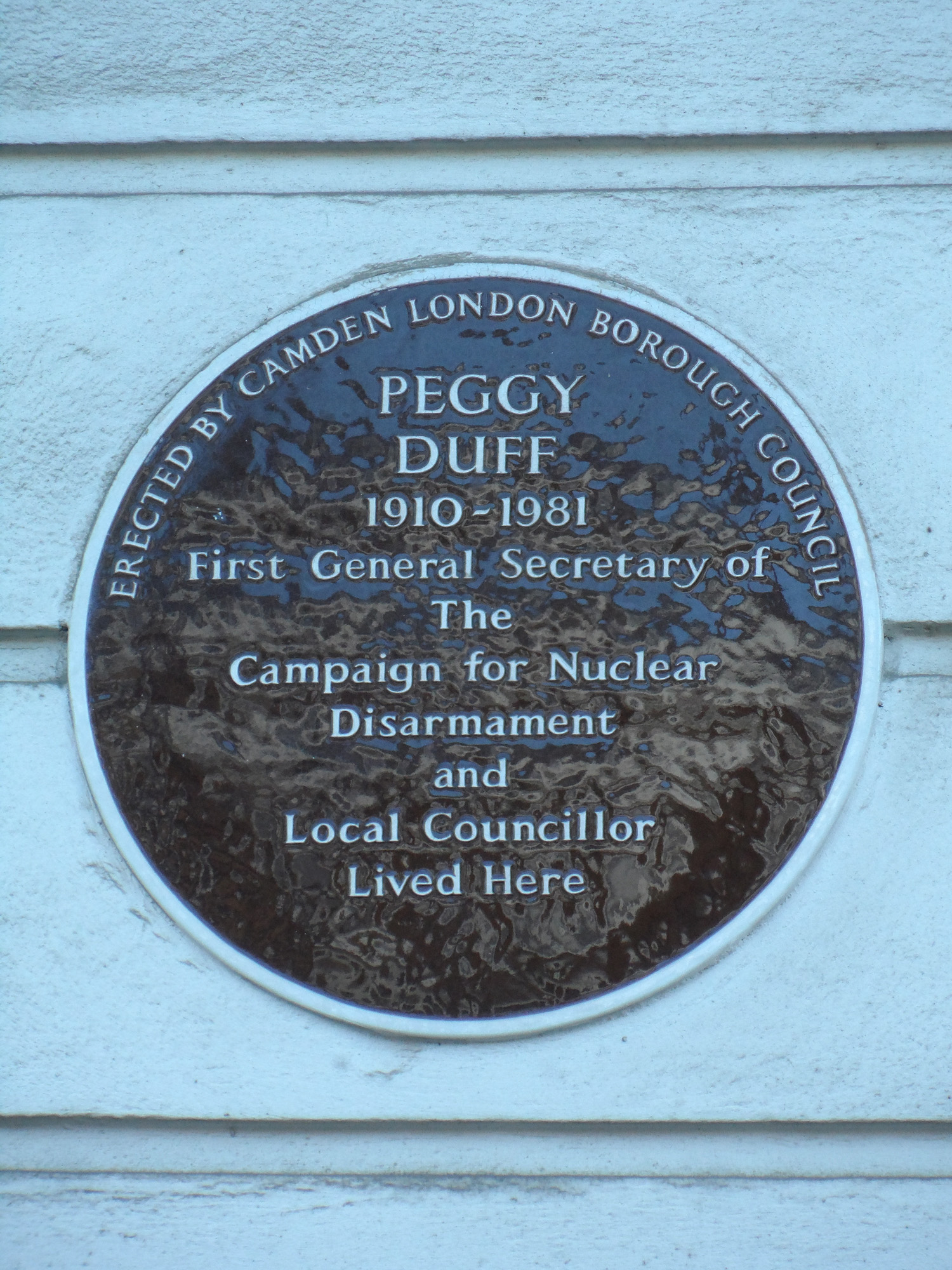
Plaque

Camden London Borough Council erected a blue plaque at 11 Albert Street, Camden Town, London, in tribute to her, reading: "Peggy Duff, 1910 – 1981, first General Secretary of the Campaign for Nuclear Disarmament and local councillor, lived here."

== See also ==
- List of peace activists

Preceded by Newly founded	General Secretary of CND; 1958–67	Succeeded by Dick Nettleton
