= A Summer in St. Tropez =

1983 French film by David Hamilton

- French Poster
- Directed by: David Hamilton
- Cinematography: Alain Casanova
- Edited by: Pauline Leroy
- Music by: Benoit Wiedemann
- Release date: 1983
- Running time: 59 minutes
- Country: France
- Language: None

A Summer in St. Tropez or Un été à Saint-Tropez (original French title) is a 1983 French film directed by photographer David Hamilton.

== Principal photography ==
The film was shot at and around David Hamilton's own house in Saint Tropez, which is 800 years old.

== Summary ==
The film contains no dialogue at all, although the characters occasionally laugh and giggle. The soundtrack is the music of Benoit Wiedemann. Stills from the film can be seen in Hamilton's book The Dance. Some shots in the film are taken from his books Sisters and Dreams of a Young Girl.

== Availability ==
This film is available on DVD in the UK.

== Book ==
A book of images from the film, A Summer in St. Tropez, was released in 1983.
