= Pierre Londiche =

French actor and playwright (1932–2022)

- Born: 27 September 1932; Armentières, France
- Died: 24 November 2022 (aged 90); Paris, France
- Occupations: Actor, playwright

Pierre Emile Albert Gerard Leclercq (27 September 1932 – 24 November 2022), better known as Pierre Londiche, was a French actor and playwright.

Londiche died in Paris on 24 November 2022, at the age of 90.

== Filmography ==
- The Things of Life (1970)
- La Maffia du plaisir (1971)
- Le Fils (1973)
- Act of Aggression (1975)
- The French Detective (1975)
- Mado (1976)
- Le Pays bleu (1977)
- Le mille-pattes fait des claquettes (1977)
- L'Aigle et la Colombe (1977)
- Et vive la liberté ! (1978)
- The Dogs (1979)
- Laura (1979)
- La provinciale (1981)
- Tir groupé (1982)
- Life Is a Bed of Roses (1983)
- Flics de choc (1983)
- Ronde de nuit (1984)
- Mesrine (1984)
- Polar (1984)
- Joy et Joan (1985)
- Le Couteau sous la gorge (1986)
- Cross (1987)
- Les Années sandwiches (1988)
- How I Killed My Father (2001)
- Legal Aid (2009)

== Theatre ==
- King Lear, directed by Pierre Debauche at the Théâtre Nanterre-Amandiers (1970)

== Publications ==
- La Fugue en émoi (2013)
