= Michael D. Roberts =

American actor

- Occupation: Actor
- Years active: 1974–present
- Spouse: Pamela Frey Roberts (m. 1976)
- Children: 2

Michael D. Roberts is an American actor.

== Career ==
Roberts played the role of Rooster in the 1970s television series Baretta. Roberts starred in the short-lived 1983 television series Manimal, appearing in five of the eight episodes which aired, as Tyrone C. Earl. His first television role was a guest appearance on the series Good Times in 1974. In 1977, he moved to feature films when he played Deputy Johnson in Herowork.

Roberts went on to appear in many other TV shows and films. He appeared in the final Steve McQueen film The Hunter (1980). Later on, he starred in the 1984 science fiction film The Ice Pirates as Roscoe. In 1988, Roberts played the role of Vern in the hit film Rain Man. More recently, he appeared in the 2006 film American Dreamz and the 2008 film Street Kings.

Roberts has made many guest appearances on television shows. In the 1980s TV series Knight Rider, he appeared in the pilot episode "Knight of the Phoenix" as Jackson, one of the two car thieves who ended up stealing KITT. His other appearances include Bosom Buddies, Quantum Leap, The Incredible Hulk, Double Trouble, Friends, MacGyver, and Seinfeld. Roberts has made appearances in several made-for-TV films.

== Personal life ==
On September 18, 1976, Roberts married actress Pamela Frey, whom he met in an acting class taught by Lillian Randolph. The couple has two children together. Roberts is a Scientologist.

== Filmography ==
=== Films ===
Year	Film	Role	Notes
1977	Herowork	Deputy Johnson	
1980	The Hunter	Poker Player	
1983	Heartbreaker	Hopper	
1984	The Ice Pirates	Roscoe	
1984	Earthlings	D.J. Young	TV movie
1986	Manhunter	The Runner	
1988	Rain Man	Vern	
1988	Back to Freedom	Sammy Samson	
1990	Sunset Beat	Maurice Smith	Pilot
1991	The Last Halloween	The Accountant	TV movie
1991	A Mother's Justice	Nick (as Michael Roberts)	TV movie
1992	Live! From Death Row	Silsbee	TV movie
1992	Wishman	Ted Taylor	
1993	In the Shadows, Someone's Watching	Driscolle	TV movie
1995	Sleepstalker	The Preacher	
1997	Most Wanted	Homeless Man	
1999	Hitman's Run	FBI Director Dean Harris	
1999	Suckers	Eddie	
2005	Hostage	Bob Ridley, Paramedic	
2006	American Dreamz	The Journalist	
2008	Street Kings	Older Black Man	
2018	A Star Is Born	Matty	

=== Television ===
Year	Title	Role	Notes
1974	Good Times	Neck-Bone	Episode "The Gang: Part 1"
1975	Lucas Tanner	Lonnie	Episode "What's Wrong with Bobbie?"
1975–1978	Baretta	'Rooster'	27 episodes
1976	Jigsaw John	Unknown	Episode "Eclipse"
1979	The Incredible Hulk	D.J.	Episode "Like a Brother"
1979	Vegas	Chickie	Episode "Demand and Supply"
1979	Quincy, M.E.	Police Officer Ed Waters	Episode "Dark Angel"
1980	B.J. and the Bear	Shades	Episode "The 18-Wheel Rip-Off"
1981	Sanford	Sam	Episode "Cal the Coward"
1981	Bosom Buddies	Mr. Norton	Episode "Amy's Career"
1981	Jessica Novak	Jack	Episode "Closeup News"
1982	Knight Rider	Jackson	Episode "Knight of the Phoenix"
1982	The Fall Guy	Jackson	Episode "The Reluctant Traveling Companion"
1983	Manimal	Tyrone C. Earl	Four episodes
1984–1985	Double Trouble	Mr. Arrechia	15 episodes
1985	Airwolf	Glen Carson	Episode "Half-Pint"
1986	Crazy Like a Fox	Unknown	Episode "A Fox at the Races"
1987	Cagney & Lacey	Eddie Hanks	Episode "The City Is Burning"
1987	Night Court	Moody	Episode "Constitution: Part 2"
1988	227	Lee Wilton	Episode "Best Friends"
1988	Hunter	Theo White	Episode "Dead on Target: Part 1"
1989–1991	MacGyver	Dr. Pierre Redemteur / Booker Wilson	Two episodes
1989–1993	Quantum Leap	Isaac King / Willis Tyler	Two episodes
1990	Agatha Christie's Poirot	Tindermans	Episode "The Mysterious Affair at Styles"
1991	Doogie Howser, M.D.	Mr. Alexander	Episode "A Kiss Ain't Just a Kiss"
1992	The Commish	Franklin Sharpe	Episode "True Believers"
1995	Live Shot	Unknown	Episode "What Price Episode?"
1996	Renegade	Police Detective	Episode "Mr. Success"
1996	Sparks	Walter	Episode "Goode for the Gander"
1996	Seinfeld	Ipswich	Episode "The Chicken Roaster"
1997	Beverly Hills, 90210	Marton Burns	Two episodes
1998	Brooklyn South	Lieutenant Dandridge	Episode "Cinnamon Buns"
1999	Wasteland	Lester	Episode "Indian Summer"
2000	City of Angels	Commander Milton Archer	Episode "Assume the Position"
2000	Friends	Head Librarian	Episode "The One with Ross' Library Book"
2000	The Michael Richards Show	Bert	Episode "The Nursing Home"
2001	Family Law	Morgan	Episode "The Quality of Mercy"
2001	Arliss	Tony	Episode "Question of Character"
2003	The District	Anderson Henderson	Episode "Ella Mae"
2006	The Suite Life of Zack & Cody	Henry	Episode "Free Tippy"
2007	The Loop	Hibbert	Episode "Crazy Goat"
2009	Make It or Break It	Pastor Harold	Episode "Sunday, Bloody Sasha, Sunday"
2012–2015	The First Family	Bernard	Series Regular
2014	Girl Meets World	Coach Gleason	Episode "Girl Meets World: of Terror"
2018	Heathers	Inspector Lehman	Episode "Reindeer Games"
