= The Age of Innocence (Hamilton book) =

1995 book by David Hamilton

- Cover
- Author: David Hamilton
- Language: English
- Genre: Photography
- Publisher: Aurum Press
- Publication date: 1995
- Pages: 220
- ISBN: 978-1-85410-304-8
- Preceded by: The Fantasies of Girls (1994)
- Followed by: Harem: Asami and Friends (1995)

The Age of Innocence is a 1995 photography and poetry book by David Hamilton. The book contains images of early-teen girls, often nude, accompanied by lyrical poetry. Images are in a boudoir setting and photographed mainly in colour using a soft-focus filter, with some shots in black-and-white.

== Reception ==
The book is one of Hamilton's most popular titles. According to the Los Angeles Times, the book's images are "thought by thousands of critics and consumers to be socially acceptable, even wonderful." Likewise The New York Times stated the book received critical praise. Outside of art critics however the book has been criticised. A journalist from The New York Times described the book as "the essence of icky...", and similarly opined that "The author could certainly be considered a dirty old man." A journalist from Time stated he was both amused and repelled by the book, calling it "as campy as it is creepy".

== Legality ==
The book is available for sale on Amazon.com, and in book shops around the world. Whilst the book itself has not been deemed illegal in any jurisdiction, the nature of the pictures within it have caused debate over what constitutes child pornography in both the US and the UK.

In 1998 Barnes & Noble was indicted on child pornography charges in the US states of Alabama and Tennessee due to selling The Age of Innocence as well as Radiant Identities and The Last Day of Summer by Jock Sturges. Anti-abortion activist and then talk-show host Randall Terry has been credited with causing the prosecution after he encouraged his listeners to locate prosecutors interested in taking the case. The charges were dropped in Tennessee after Barnes & Noble agreed to move the books to an area that was less accessible to children. The indictment in Alabama was dismissed after it was determined the books did not violate state law. The publicity from Randall Terry's efforts was linked to an increase in sales of the books.

In 2005 a man from Surrey, England was charged with being in possession of 19,000 images of children, including images from The Age of Innocence. The man stated in his defence that all of the images were sold by websites including WH Smith, Tesco, Waterstones, and Amazon. Nevertheless his collection of images was ruled to be in the level 1 indecency category, though the ruling did not mention The Age of Innocence. Following the conviction WH Smith decided to stop selling The Age of Innocence from their website.

A spokesman for Hamilton stated "We are deeply saddened and disappointed by this ... We have known for some time that the law in Britain and the US — our two biggest markets — is becoming tighter each year. But the fact remains that the courts still have to decide on each case." The Guardian originally reported that it was a "landmark ruling" against Hamilton's photographs. However, they later clarified that this was incorrect; there was no landmark ruling. Rather the defendant had pleaded guilty to specimen charges. A policeman in Surrey stated that anyone owning a book by Hamilton containing images of naked children could now be charged, though he was later forced to make a formal apology for the statement, with a senior police officer confirming no official ruling on Hamilton's work had been made.

In 2010 a man was convicted of level 1 child pornography for owning four books, including The Age of Innocence as well as Still Time by Sally Mann, which he purchased from a bookstore in Walthamstow, London. His conviction was overturned on appeal in 2011, with the judge calling his conviction "very unfair" and criticising the Crown Prosecution Service (CPS) for prosecuting him. The judge concluded that "If the [CPS] wishes to test whether the pictures in the books are indecent, the right way to deal with the matter is by way of prosecuting the publisher or retailer—not the individual purchaser."
