= Dawn Dunlap =

American actress

Dawn Dunlap is an American former actress best known for her appearance as Laura in David Hamilton's Laura. She quit the film industry in 1985. She later married British advertising agent Frank Lowe, taking the name "Lady Dawn Lowe". The couple had a son (Sebastian) and divorced in 2007.

== Filmography ==
Year	Title	Role	Notes
1979	Laura	Laura	also known as Laura, les ombres de l'été
1982	Liar's Moon	Teaser	
1982	Night Shift	Maxine	
1982	Forbidden World	Tracy Baxter	
1983	Heartbreaker	Kim	
1985	Barbarian Queen	Taramis	

== Bibliography ==
=== About Dawn Dunlap ===
Mathieu, Olivier (2017). Le portrait de Dawn Dunlap. Casa Cărţii de Ştiinţă, Cluj-Napoca. ISBN 9786061710720.
