= Sleepstalker =

1995 direct-to-video film

Sleepstalker - The Sandman's Last Rites
- Directed by: Turi Meyer
- Written by: Al Septien; Turi Meyer
- Produced by: Luigi Cingolani; Brian Patrick O'Toole; Al Septien
- Starring: Michael Harris; Jay Underwood; Kathryn Morris; Michael D. Roberts
- Music by: Jim Manzie
- Production companies: Osmosis Pictures; Prism Entertainment
- Distributed by: Prism Entertainment
- Release date: April 25, 1995
- Running time: 105 minutes
- Countries: United Kingdom; United States
- Language: English

Sleepstalker (released in the Philippines as A Demon in the House) is a 1995 horror film directed by Turi Meyer, written by Al Septien and Meyer, and starring Michael Harris, Jay Underwood, Kathryn Morris, and Michael D. Roberts.

== Plot ==
Seventeen years after slaughtering all but one member of a family, "The Sandman" (Michael Harris) is pending execution. Before his execution, the jailers allow a minister (Michael D. Roberts) to visit him. The minister is a voodoo priest and an ally of the prisoner, which the jailers did not realize. A hex is placed onto The Sandman, so that when his execution is over, his soul can travel to a new body made of sand, but all his blood relatives would need to die. The Sandman then plots to kill a young man named Griffin (Jay Underwood), who is his biological little brother and, additionally, a survivor of the abuse of their birth father. Griffin survived the attempted slaughter, but his adoptive parents did not. The Sandman is then reborn, upon execution, to have a chance to try once again.

== Cast ==
- Michael Harris as The Sandman
  - Giuseppe Andrews as Young Sandman
- Jay Underwood as Griffin Davis
  - Vincent Barry as Young Griffin Davis
- Kathryn Morris as Megan
- Michael D. Roberts as The Preacher
- William Lucking as Detective Bronson Worth
- Kathleen McMartin as Dana
- A.J. Glassman as Kenny
- Peter Vasquez as 'Dog' Sanchez
- Ken Foree as Detective Rolands
- Christopher Boyer as Detective Garcia
- Angel Ashley as Cheryl
- Lenore Van Camp as Julia
- Marc McClure as Mr. Davis, Griffin's Father
- Caryn Richman as Mrs. Davis, Griffin's Mother
- Barry Lynch as Pierson, Prison Guard
- Michael Faella as Sandman's Father
- Lillian Hurst as Old Woman

== Production ==
An international co-production between The United Kingdom and The United States. Prism Entertainment began pre-production of the film in 1994.

== Release ==
Sleepstalker was released direct-to-video in 1995. In the Philippines, the film was released in theaters as A Demon in the House on April 27, 1995.

== Reception ==
TV Guide rated it 2/5 stars and wrote, "Sleepstalker simultaneously demonstrates its director's cinematic finesse and frustration at being unable to transform a sow's ear screenplay."
