= Heartbreaker (1983 film) =

1983 film

- Directed by: Frank Zuniga
- Written by: Vincent Gutierrez
- Produced by: Chris Anders; Chris D. Nebe
- Starring: Fernando Allende; Dawn Dunlap; Peter Gonzales Falcon; Miguel Ferrer; Michael D. Roberts; Robert Dryer; Pepe Serna; Rafael Campos
- Cinematography: Michael Lonzo
- Edited by: Larry Bock
- Music by: Robert J. Walsh
- Distributed by: Monarex
- Release date: May 1983
- Running time: 90 minutes
- Country: United States
- Language: English

Heartbreaker is a 1983 American drama film directed by Frank Zuniga with music composed by Robert J. Walsh. It features Fernando Allende, Dawn Dunlap, Peter Gonzales Falcon, and Miguel Ferrer in the lead roles.

== Cast ==
- Fernando Allende
- Dawn Dunlap
- Peter Gonzales Falcon
- Miguel Ferrer
- Michael D. Roberts
- Robert Dryer
- Pepe Serna
- Rafael Campos
