= The Last Day of Summer (book) =

1991 photography book by Jock Sturges

- Cover
- Author: Jock Sturges
- Language: English
- Genre: Photography
- Publisher: Aperture
- Publication date: 1991
- Pages: 96
- ISBN: 978-0-89381-538-7
- Followed by: Radiant Identities

The Last Day of Summer is a 1991 photography book by Jock Sturges. The book is Sturges' first and consists of 60 black-and-white images of both children and adults, many of which show nudity. Many photos were taken at nude beaches in France, including the image on the front cover, which is of a girl named Marine who would later also appear on the cover of Sturges 2000 book, Jock Sturges: New Work 1996–2000.

== Reception ==
A. D. Coleman gave a favorable review of the book in The New York Observer, stating: "Sturges sustains a delicate balance on a very precarious wire ... His struggle is to observe and render his subjects in all of their complexities, trembling on the cusp of change. The result of this long-term, communal effort is one of the most clear-eyed, responsible investigations of puberty and the emergence of sexuality in the medium's history, making a metaphor of the metamorphosis from child to adult."

== Attempted censorship ==
In 1998 Barnes & Noble was indicted on child pornography charges in the US states of Alabama and Tennessee for selling The Last Day of Summer and Radiant Identities by Sturges, as well as The Age of Innocence by David Hamilton. Then talk-show host Randall Terry has been credited with causing the prosecution as well as protests after he encouraged his listeners to locate prosecutors interested in taking the case. Over an eight-month period as many as 40 demonstrations and incidents occurred at book stores stocking the three books. Some activists went into stores and destroyed copies of the books in an attempt to halt sales.

When questioned regarding the prosecution, Sturges stated it would waste taxpayers' money, as the photographs "are not done flirtatiously" and have been displayed in major museums. Sturges responded to the indictment labeling the books as "obscene material containing visual reproduction of persons under 17 years of age involved in obscene acts" by stating "This is pretty chilling language because in fact the people in my pictures are not engaged in any acts at all. They are living in contexts that are naturist, which is to say that when it's warm and people feel like it, they don't wear clothes", also stating "To find the work obscene, you'd have to find (nude) Homo Sapiens between (ages) 1 and 17 inherently obscene, and I find that obscene."

The charges were dropped in Tennessee after Barnes & Noble agreed to move the books to an area that was less accessible to children. The indictment in Alabama was dismissed by state officials after it was determined the books did not violate state law. The publicity from Randall Terry's efforts was linked to an increase in sales of the book.
