= Forbidden World =

1982 science fiction film

- Promotional poster
- Directed by: Allan Holzman
- Written by: Tim Curnen
- Story by: R.J. Robertson; Jim Wynorski
- Produced by: Roger Corman
- Starring: Jesse Vint; Dawn Dunlap; June Chadwick; Linden Chiles; Fox Harris; Raymond Oliver; Scott Paulin
- Cinematography: Tim Suhrstedt
- Edited by: Allan Holzman; Martin Nicholson
- Music by: Susan Justin
- Distributed by: New World Pictures
- Release date: May 7, 1982
- Running time: 77 minutes
- Country: United States
- Language: English
- Budget: Under $1 million
- Box office: $4 million

Forbidden World, originally titled Mutant, is a 1982 American science fiction horror film. The screenplay was written by Tim Curnen, from a screenstory by R.J. Robertson and Jim Wynorski. It was co-edited and directed by Allan Holzman, who had edited Battle Beyond the Stars two years earlier. The cast includes Jesse Vint, Dawn Dunlap, June Chadwick, Linden Chiles, Fox Harris and Michael Bowen. Forbidden World has also been released under the titles Mutant and Subject 20.

The film received three nominations for the 1983 Saturn Awards: Best Low Budget Film, Best Make-up and Best Special Effects, but lost to The Evil Dead, Poltergeist and E.T. the Extra-Terrestrial, respectively. It was generally panned by critics as a cheap, exploitative imitation of the movie Alien, with sex, nudity, uneven editing, cheap special effects, and a sound design which some moviegoers found unpleasant, although the electronic music score produced by Susan Justin received mostly positive attention. It is frequently paired with and compared to the previous year's Corman-produced Alien rip-off Galaxy of Terror, with which Forbidden World shares some of the same sets (designed by James Cameron). The movie also makes use of footage recycled from the 1980 movie Battle Beyond the Stars, which was also produced by Corman.

The film was remade in 1991 under the title Dead Space, on which Corman served as executive producer. The remake has minor variations but still retains the plot and character stylings of the original, also referring to the mutated virus as a "metamorph" as the original did.

== Plot ==
In the distant future, at a genetic research station located on the remote desert planet of Xarbia, a research team has created an experimental lifeform they have designated "Subject 20". This lifeform was built out of the synthetic DNA strain, "Proto B", and was intended to stave off a galaxy-wide food crisis. However, Subject 20 mutates rapidly and uncontrollably and kills all of the laboratory subject animals before cocooning itself within an examination booth.

Military officer Mike Colby, accompanied by his robot assistant SAM-104, is called in to investigate the problem. After Colby settles in, his decision to terminate Subject 20 to prevent further deaths is met with research-minded secrecy and resistance. The staff of the station includes the head of research, Gordon Hauser, his assistant Barbara Glaser, lab assistant Tracy Baxter, lab technician Jimmy Swift, electrician Brian Beale, the station's head of security, Earl Richards and Cal Timbergen, the medical doctor.

When Subject 20 hatches from its cocoon, it begins killing the personnel at the station, starting with Jimmy, who was charged with cleansing the subject lab of the dead animal test subjects. As Subject 20 continues to kill most of the station crew, the reason for the deception is revealed. Subject 20's genetic design incorporates human DNA, and its method of killing is to inject its prey with the Proto B DNA strain which then proceeds to remove all genetic differences within specific cells. The result is that the victim's living body slowly erodes into a gelatinous pile of pure protein which Subject 20 consumes for sustenance. After its final mutation, where the creature evolves into a huge insect-like being with a large mouth full of sharp teeth, the creature is slain when it eats Cal's cancer-ridden liver, its body genetically self-destructing from within. Mike and Tracy are left as the only survivors from Subject 20's rampage.

== Cast ==
- Jesse Vint as Mike Colby
- Dawn Dunlap as Tracy Baxter
- June Chadwick as Dr. Barbara Glaser
- Linden Chiles as Dr. Gordon Hauser
- Fox Harris as Dr. Cal Timbergen
- Raymond Oliver as Brian Beale
- Scott Paulin as Earl Richards
- Michael Bowen as Jimmy Swift
- Don Olivera as SAM-104

== Production ==
According to director Allan Holzman he began shooting without a script with these directions from Corman: "You have four days to write, produce and direct a seven- to eight-minute opening of a space movie… I'll give you an astronaut and a robot, and if you need any inspiration, I've always wanted to do a version of Lawrence of Arabia in outer space." Holzman created the sequence adding in a dog fighting sequence using footage from Battle Beyond the Stars, Corman was impressed and signed Holzman to direct.

Forbidden World was shot under the working title Mutant over the course of a 20-day shooting schedule for under $1 million. Due to the rapid pace of filming and production, cast and crew often had to be careful what they touched or where they stepped as sets would often have wet paint while they were filming. The effects were crafted by Robert and Dennis Skotak. During editing, Holzman discovered he had insufficient footage of the titular mutant and called in John Carl Buechler to redo some of the sequences.

== Reception ==
Review aggregation website Rotten Tomatoes gives the film a rating of 60% based on reviews from 5 critics.

The Los Angeles Times called it "lively, amusingly gruesome."

== Home media ==
On July 20, 2010, Shout! Factory released Forbidden World on a DVD and Blu-ray Disc set. The set also includes the original Allan Holzman cut that was rejected by Roger Corman due to having humor, while Corman wanted the film to be done as a straight sci-fi/horror film. This is the first time this cut is available anywhere.

On August 13, 2019, Scream Factory released Forbidden World on a single disc Blu-ray collectors edition in a steelbook.
