= Tendres Cousines =

- Directed by: David Hamilton
- Screenplay by: Josiane Lévêque; Werner P. Zibaso; Claude d'Anna
- Based on: Tendres cousines by Pascal Lainé
- Produced by: Véra Belmont; Linda Gutenberg
- Production companies: Filmédis; Planet-Film Berlin; Stéphan Films
- Release date: 19 November 1980
- Running time: 92 minutes
- Countries: France; West Germany
- Language: French
- Box office: $10.7 million

Tendres Cousines (English: Tender Cousins) is a 1980 French film directed by David Hamilton. The film was released in the United Kingdom as Cousins in Love.

== Plot ==
The story begins on 5 July 1939. The film opens with a narration by Julien, who states that he is going on 15, and that he is in love with his cousin Julia, and also that Julia's younger sister, Poune, is in love with him. His older self-obsessed sister Claire is about to marry for money. He lives with his mother, who has taken on boarders due to financial difficulties: a professor who fled Nazi Germany, his daughter, and a fading actress, Clementine.

Julien constantly tries to win the attention of Julia, whilst Poune tries to win the attention of him. Julien gives Julia a Swiss army knife as a gift, though she shows little interest in it. She later gives it to Poune. Claire's fiancé, Charles, shows interest in Julia. The professor continues his experiments into capturing a soul, whilst his daughter encourages Julien to pursue Julia. Julia writes of her interest in Charles in her diary, and talks of her pity for Julien, who she hopes will find a woman. Julien later confronts Julia and protests her friendship with Charles, to no avail.

Charles takes Julia for a drive, but she rejects his sexual advances. Claire questions Charles about his relationship with Julia; Charles pleads ignorance. When Julien pranks Charles by releasing the brake in his car so that it rolls down a hill and is damaged, he is confined to his room. There, Mathilde, one of the maids, tries to seduce Julien, but Julien's mother catches her naked in his bed. Mathilde is sent away and is replaced by Madeleine. Charles immediately pursues Madeleine, and Poune and Julien write a note to Julia to get her into the barn at the time Charles has arranged to meet Madeleine. Julia catches Charles having sex with Madeleine and is furious at him. Clementine comforts Julia.

The following day is Julia's 16th birthday party. The partygoers leave early, however, after it is discovered that Germany has declared war. Charles, the male servants, and Julien's father leave the estate to go to war. The absence of the men creates extra work for Julien, the professor and the women. Julien, focused on work, loses interest in Julia. Clementine is informed she will have to leave the following week as her room has been rented. Exhausted from the previous day's work, Julien falls asleep in the hay and is awoken by Justine, one of the female servants. Justine asks Julien to undress her and then has sex with him.

The next day the women are preparing breakfast for Julien. Justine attempts to take it to him, but one of the other servants, Angèle, insists it is her turn. Julien is next seen kissing the naked Angèle. He coerces her into performing oral sex on him. Julia walks in and slaps Julien in the face upon finding them; Julien replies that it is none of her business. Later Poune gives the Swiss army knife back to Julien, telling him that they are no longer friends.

Julia tells Clementine she has decided to leave with her. Clementine tries to talk her out of it. Julien approaches Julia. The two argue; Julien tells Julia he is ashamed that he used to love her. The two fight, then wrestle on the ground before slowing down and eventually kissing. In the final scene Julien and Julia are lying naked together in the hay. Julia asks if he will give her the Swiss army knife again. In a cocky voice, Julien replies "Yeah sure, baby, sure" as he puts his clothes back on. Julia replies, "Don't speak to me like that." Julien replies in the same tone "OK, baby." Julia slaps him in the face, and the screen freeze-frames on Julien's shocked expression.

== Cast ==
- Thierry Tevini as Julien
- Anja Schüte as Julia
- Valérie Dumas as Poune
- Évelyne Dandry as Aunt Adèle
- Elisa Servier as Claire
- Jean-Yves Chatelais as Charles
- Hannes Kaetner as Professor Schöberg
- Silke Rein as Liselotte Schöberg
- Laure Dechasnel as Clementine
- Macha Méril as Agnès, Julien's Mother
- Pierre Vernier as Julien's father
- Anne Fontaine as Justine
- Gaëlle Legrand as Mathilde
- Carmen Weber as Madeleine
- Fanny Bastien as Angèle
- Jean Rougerie as Monsieur Lacroix
- Catherine Rouvel as Madame Lacroix
- Pierre Chantepie as Matthieu
- Jean-Louis Fortuit as Antoine
- Jean-Pierre Rambal as Postman Bazu

== Ratings ==
The film received an R rating in the United States, an 18 certificate in the UK and was rated R16 (restricting sale to persons under 16) in New Zealand. It was, however, refused classification by the Australian Classification Board, making it illegal to sell, hire or publicly exhibit the film in Australia.

== Companion book ==
As with most of Hamilton's films, a photo-book of the same name containing images from the film was created. Released in 1982 the book contained 112 pages with 100 colour and 38 halftone images.

== Reception and legacy ==
Playboy gave a positive review of the film in their July 1981 issue, saying it "captures the elusive eroticism of flowering womanhood" and calling it "Hamilton's most beautifully photographed film, and probably the truest reflection of his inner landscape".

In a 2010 interview, Anja Schüte said she did not regret acting in the film when she was 15 or briefly appearing naked in it, saying the film itself was not scandalous, and was only made so by the press.
