= Radiant Identities =

1994 photography book by Jock Sturges

- Cover
- Author: Jock Sturges
- Language: English
- Genre: Photography
- Publisher: Aperture
- Publication date: 1994
- Pages: 96
- ISBN: 978-0893815950
- Preceded by: The Last Day of Summer
- Followed by: Evolution of Grace

Radiant Identities is a 1994 photography book by Jock Sturges. The book consists of 60 black-and-white images of both children and adults, many of which show nudity. Photos were taken primarily at nude beaches in France and California. The girl on the front cover is Misty Dawn, a model featured in many of Sturges' books. In the United States, the book has been mentioned in debates over whether nude pictures of children are art or pornography.

== Controversy ==
In 1998 Radiant Identities and Sturges' previous book, The Last Day of Summer, along with The Age of Innocence by David Hamilton, faced controversy over their content in the US states of Alabama and Tennessee.
