= Roland Kaiser (singer) =

German schlager singer (born 1952)

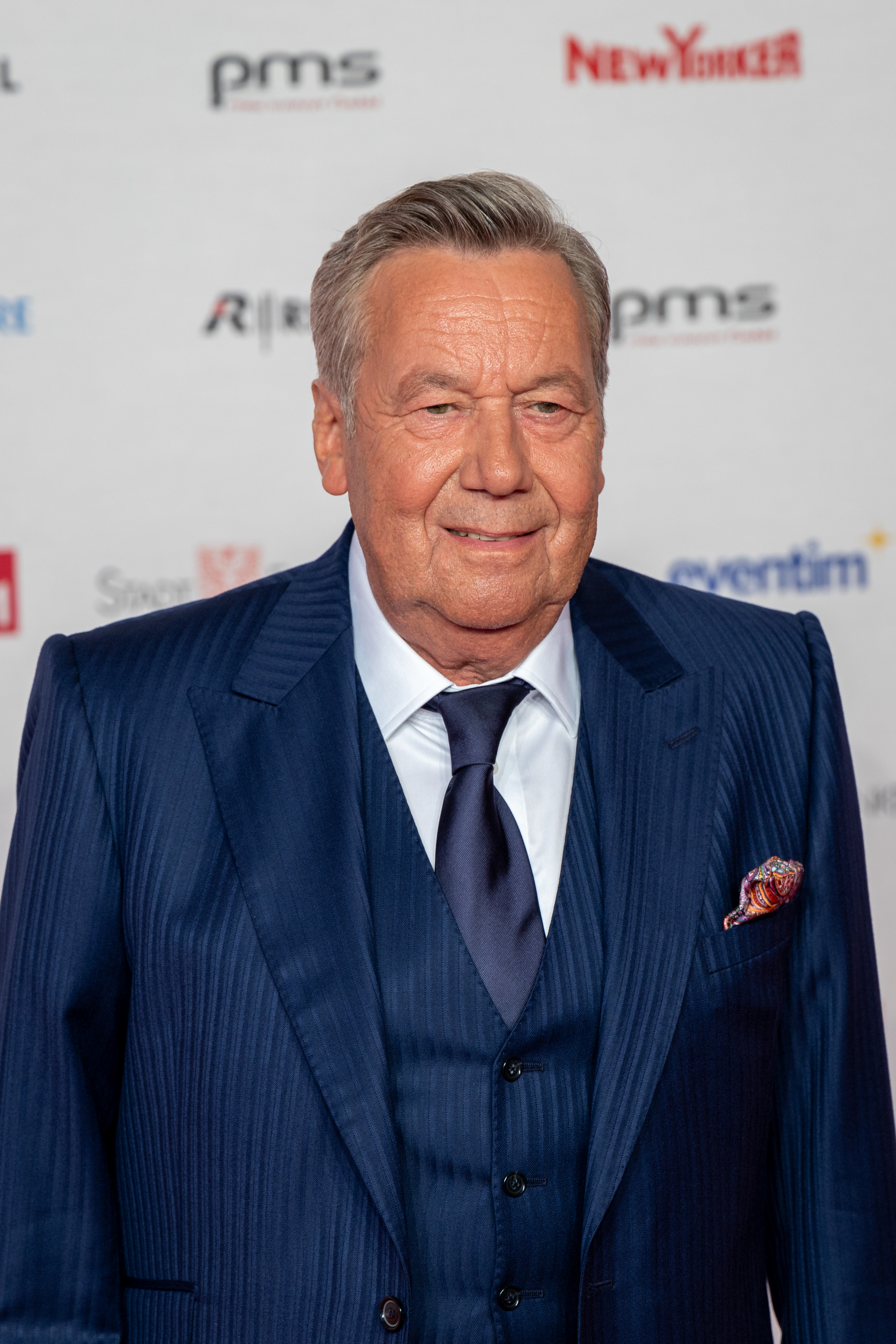
- Kaiser in 2022
- Born: Ronald Keiler; 10 May 1952 (age 73); West Berlin, West Germany
- Occupation: Singer
- Spouses: Christina Keiler (divorced) Anja Schüte (m. 1990; div. 1995) Silvia Keiler (m. 1996)
- Children: 3

Signature
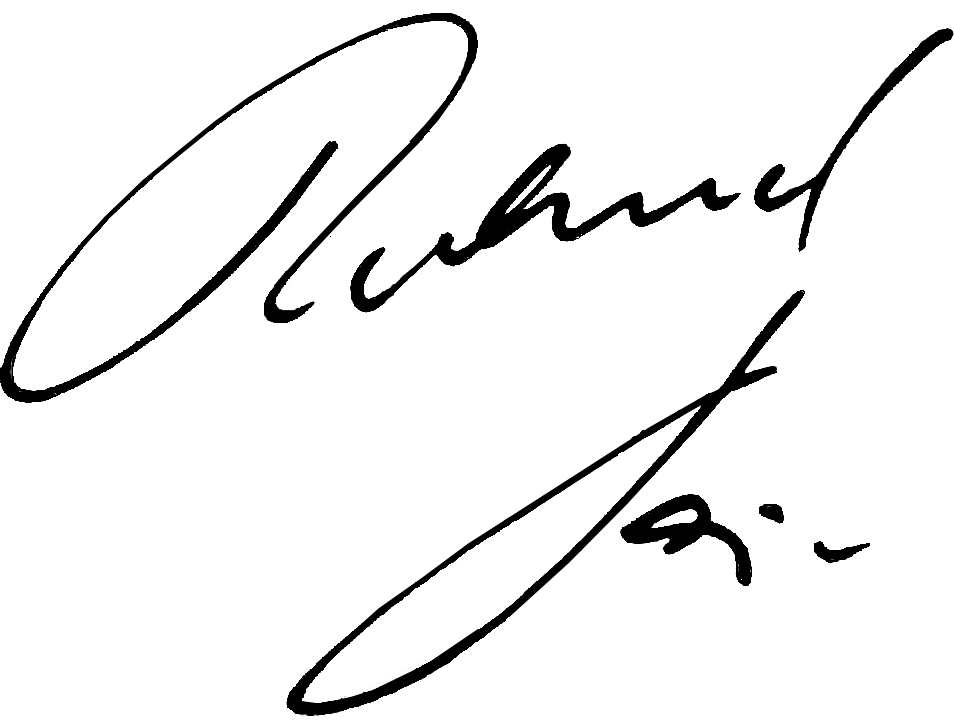

Roland Kaiser (born Ronald Keiler; 10 May 1952) is a German Schlager singer. He is one of the most successful German-speaking Schlager singers.

Kaiser was born in West Berlin. He was working as a marketing executive in a car firm where he was discovered by German music producers Gerd Kämpfe and Thomas Meisel, after Kaiser picked up singing cover songs at small pubs and private parties as a hobby. In 1974, he released his first single under the stage name of Roland Kaiser, titled "Was ist wohl aus ihr geworden?", and in 1976 he got his first chart placement with "Frei, das heißt allein", which reached under Top 20 on the West German top list.

In 1980, he competed in the West German trial for the Eurovision Song Contest but did not win. In the same year, he had his greatest success on the lists so far with the song "Santa Maria" (by Oliver Onions/Guido & Maurizio De Angelis), which maintained its first place in West Germany for six weeks. After years in Berlin-Charlottenburg Kaiser lives in Münster-Aaseestadt.
