= Promise Not to Tell =

2007 novel by Jennifer McMahon

- Author: Jennifer McMahon
- Cover artist: Jock Sturges
- Language: English
- Genre: mystery, horror, psychological
- Publisher: HarperCollins
- Publication date: April 2007
- Publication place: United States
- Media type: paperback
- Pages: 256
- ISBN: 978-0-06-114331-1
- OCLC: 70208099
- Dewey Decimal: 813/.6 22
- LC Class: PS3613.C584 P68 2007

Promise Not to Tell is a 2007 mystery novel with supernatural elements written by Vermont author Jennifer McMahon. The book was released in April 2007 in the US by Harper Paperbacks (an imprint of HarperCollins). It was released in Germany by Rowohlt Verlag, under the title Das Mädchen Im Wald (The Girl in the Woods), in October 2007. It was released in the United Kingdom by Orion Books in 2008.

== Plot ==
In 2002, Kate Cypher, a 41-year-old school nurse, returns home to her Vermont hippie commune where she grew up to care for her aging mother, who is afflicted with Alzheimer's disease. Her first night home, a murder takes place behind her mother's cabin—the killing is identical to that of Kate's childhood friend, Del Griswold, who was murdered in 1971. Del was a scrappy outcast in life, shunned and taunted as "Potato Girl." Since her unsolved murder, Del had become something of a local legend, supposedly tormenting the townsfolk from beyond the grave. Kate never revealed her close relationship to Del, before or after her death, unable to stand up to those who pitied or reviled Del. Kate is drawn into the investigation of the modern-day crime, and must revisit Del's original murder, and her culpability in it. Along the way, she realizes that someone is playing games with her: leaving cryptic messages that tell her where to go. By following these clues, Kate re-meets many members of the hippie town she grew up in and relives some of the horrifying times during Del's murder.
