= Jennifer McMahon (writer) =

American novelist (born 1968)

- Born: 1968 (age 57–58); Hartford, Connecticut, U.S.
- Education: Goddard College; Vermont College
- Occupation: Novelist
- Partner: Drea
- Children: 1
- Website: jennifer-mcmahon.com

Jennifer McMahon (born 1968 in Hartford, Connecticut) is an American novelist who formerly resided in Barre, Vermont and now lives in Montpelier, Vermont. She has a civil union with her partner Drea, and one child, daughter Zella. She is a graduate of Goddard College, and studied poetry at Vermont College.

Her debut novel, Promise Not to Tell, was published by Harper Paperbacks (an imprint of HarperCollins) in April 2007. Promise Not to Tell was described by Publishers Weekly as "Part mystery-thriller and part ghost story". It was released in Germany by Rowohlt Verlag, under the title Das Mädchen im Wald (The Girl in the Woods), in October 2007. Orion Publishing Group published Promise Not to Tell in the United Kingdom in 2008. A French edition and Italian edition have also been released.

Her follow-up suspense novel, Island of Lost Girls was published by Harper Paperbacks in April 2008. It was a New York Times Bestseller. It was released in Germany by Rowohlt Verlag, under the title Die Insel der verlorenen Kinder (The Island of Lost Children); and in the Netherlands by De Boekerij under the title Het eiland van de verdwenen meisjes (The Island of Missing Girls). Sphere, an imprint of Little, Brown, published it in the United Kingdom in September 2009.

Her next book from HarperCollins, Dismantled, was published in hardcover in June 2009. It was nominated for a Lambda Literary Award. Dismantled has also been released in the UK (under the title Girl in the Woods), Germany, and the Netherlands.

In May 2011, McMahon's suspense novel, Don't Breathe a Word, was published, again by HarperCollins.

McMahon also has a book of lesbian teen fiction, entitled My Tiki Girl, which was released by Dutton Children's (an imprint of Penguin Group) in May 2008. It was included in the American Library Association's 2009 Rainbow List.

== Novels ==
- Promise Not to Tell (2007)
- Island of Lost Girls (2008)
- My Tiki Girl (2008)
- Dismantled (2009)
- Don't Breathe a Word (2011)
- The One I Left Behind (2013)
- The Winter People (2014)
- The Night Sister (2015)
- Burntown (2017)
- The Invited (2019)
- The Drowning Kind (2021)
- The Children on the Hill (2022)
- My Darling Girl (2023)

== Other works ==
- Hannah-Beast (Dark Corners collection) Kindle Edition (2018)
- The Deer Wife appears in the anthology Hex Life: Wicked New Tales of Witchery (2019)
- Idiot Girls appears in the anthology Other Terrors: An Inclusive Anthology (2022)
- Monster Girl appears in the non-fiction anthology Why I Love Horror: Essays on Horror Literature (2025)
