= Twenty Five Years of an Artist =

1993 book by David Hamilton

- Cover
- Author: David Hamilton
- Genre: Photography
- Publisher: Aurum Press
- Publication date: September 24, 1993
- Pages: 316
- ISBN: 978-1854102669
- Preceded by: Blooming Minayo: September 28 (1992)
- Followed by: The Fantasies of Girls (1994)

Twenty Five Years of an Artist is a 1993 photography book chronicling the career of David Hamilton. The book, which is three hundred and sixteen pages long, includes both photographs and twenty pages of text scattered between the pictures. The book is published by Aurum Press.

== Content ==
The text was written by Philippe Gautier and Marc Tagger based on discussions and interviews with Hamilton. The English translation is by Yanick M. Haywood and is adapted by Liliane James. The book itself is designed by Hamilton and his ex-wife Gertrude Hamilton.

The introduction contrasts the early 1990s artistic climate with the early 1970s, when Hamilton's first book was published. The text starts from Hamilton's childhood, and proceeds chronologically through his career in a fairly prosaic manner, concluding with candid photographs of the man himself. The latter half of the text is more personal, discussing Hamilton's outlook on his art and life, including an explanation for his fascination with young girls, which the majority of his photography expresses.

Much of the photography covers Hamilton's familiar themes of young girls, clothed and not, prepubescent and older. Half of the rest covers his other subject matter: landscapes, cityscapes, flowers, and other still lifes. A few include his photographs for the Nina Ricci perfume L'Air du Temps, which he published for years in their advertisements. The final one fourth document Hamilton's life, showing him with his models and other important people whom he has known and with whom he has worked.

== Familiar photographs included ==
- The schoolperformance, "Bilitis," Saint-Tropez, 1976
- The ballet school, Saint-Tropez, 1979
- Homage to Boudin, Cabourg, 1987
- The three nymphs, Ramatuelle, 1988
- Homage to Balthus, South of France, 1980

== Other versions ==
- Seine Besten Bilder (1999, German issue)
- David Hamilton (2006, French issue, more content)
- 25 Years of an Artist (1992)- ten telephone cards plus photo-prints of the pictures, signed.
