= Euan Duff =

Euan Duff is a photographer and photo-journalist, born in 1939 to the political activist Peggy Duff and her husband Bill, a journalist who died in the latter stages of the Second World War.

He freelanced as a photo-journalist in London during the 1960s and then went into teaching, finally setting up and running the first degree course in photography offered by Trent Polytechnic, Nottingham, before taking early retirement in 1990.

He published How We Are (Allen Lane, 1971) and Workless (with text by Dennis Marsden, Penguin, 1975), and exhibited at the ICA in London in 1971. His work was included in two major retrospectives of British photography: "Through the Looking Glass" at the Barbican in 1990; and "How We Are: Photographing Britain" (whose title derived from his book) at Tate Britain in 2007. His work was featured, along with that of Peter Mitchell, in an exhibition and conference about British photography in the 1970s held at the University of Sussex in 2005, after he had donated much of his early work to their archives. Other work was also donated to the V&A collection, the National Portrait Gallery (including a print of his mother) and Lincolnshire County Council, but he is not represented in the Arts Council's collections of photography.

The critic John Berger wrote in his introduction to How We Are: "I can think of no comparable contemporary English work of literature or visual art which so gently, so persistently and so finally brings one face-to-face with the wretchedness of the kind of society in which we live: a society in which every personal meaning achieved by an individual is pitted against corporate meaninglessness; in which every personal need, expressed in terms of what is socially available, is in agonizing conflict with the origins of that need in the soul."
