= Étienne Périer =

Étienne Périer may refer to:

- Étienne Perier (governor) (fl. 1727–1731), governor of the Louisiana colony
- Étienne Périer (director) (1931–2020), Belgian film director
