= Laura (1979 film) =

1979 film by David Hamilton

Laura: Shadows of a Summer
- Theatrical release poster
- French: Laura, les ombres de l'été
- Directed by: David Hamilton
- Written by: Joseph Morhaim; André Szots
- Story by: David Hamilton
- Produced by: Serge Laski; Malcolm James Thomson
- Starring: Maud Adams; Dawn Dunlap; James Mitchell
- Cinematography: Bernard Daillencourt
- Edited by: Joële Van Effenterre
- Music by: Patrick Juvet
- Production companies: C.O.R.A.; Les Films de l'Alma
- Distributed by: SNC
- Release date: 28 November 1979 (France)
- Running time: 95 minutes
- Country: France
- Language: French

Laura: Shadows of a Summer (French: Laura, les ombres de l'été) is a 1979 French erotic romantic drama film directed by photographer David Hamilton. It stars Dawn Dunlap as the title character. Hamilton made a cameo appearance in the film.

== Plot ==
Paul Wyler is a successful sculptor best known for sculpting nude young girls. When he encounters an old flame, Sarah, he is so smitten by her beautiful daughter Laura that he asks Sarah if she will pose for him. Sarah, married but still jealous of the fact that her former lover is more attracted to her daughter, tells Paul that Laura is not interested, even though she is actually quite enthusiastic about doing it. As an alternative to live posing, Sarah takes photos of Laura posing nude and gives them to Paul so that he can sculpt Laura. After a fire at an art exhibit, Paul goes blind and cannot complete the sculpture. In the end, Laura, when going to say goodbye to Paul, allows him to finish his work by feeling her body and sculpting by feeling. This leads to a sexual encounter between the two, and the next morning Laura's mother comes to take her away.

== Cast ==
- Maud Adams as Sarah Moore
- Dawn Dunlap as Laura Moore
- James Mitchell as Paul Thomas Wyler
- Pierre Londiche as Richard Moore
- Thierry Redler as Costa
- Maureen Kerwin as Marline Royer
- Gunilla Astrom as Diane
- Katia Kofet as Claudie
- Louise Vincent as Madame Flory
- Luciano as Timothez Sega
- Bill Millie as choreographer

== Production ==
The film is shot in the same soft focus style that is common of David Hamilton's photography and his other films.

== Companion book ==
In 1979, Hamilton released a portfolio tie-in with the film, titled Shadows of a Summer.
