= David Hamilton (photographer) =

British photographer and film director (1933–2016)

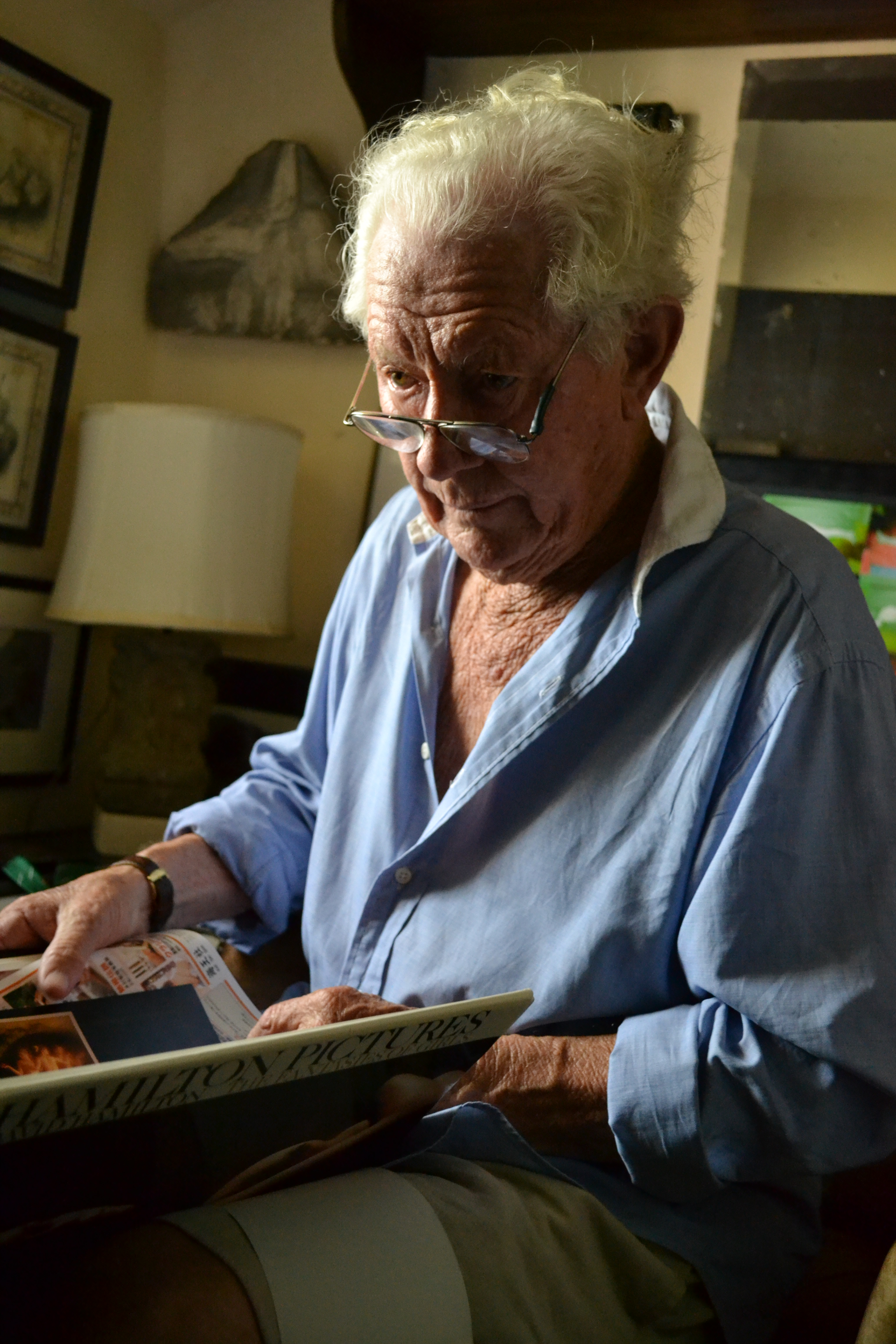
- Hamilton in 2011
- Born: 15 April 1933; London, England
- Died: 25 November 2016 (aged 83); Paris, France
- Occupations: Film director, photographer

David Hamilton (15 April 1933 – 25 November 2016) was a British photographer and film director best known for his photography of young women and girls, mostly nude. Hamilton's images became part of an "Art or pornography?" debate.

== Early life ==
Hamilton was born in 1933 and grew up in London. His schooling was interrupted by World War II. As an evacuee, he spent some time in the countryside of Dorset, which inspired some of his work. After the war, Hamilton returned to London and finished his schooling.

== Career and later life ==
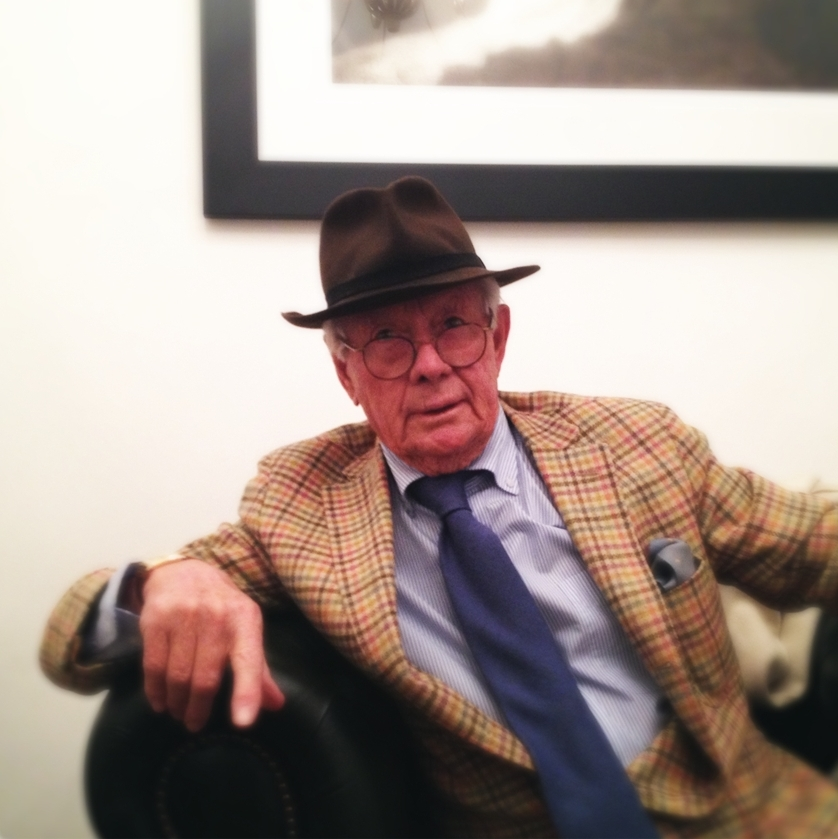
Hamilton in 2012

His artistic skills began to emerge during a job at an architect's office. At age 20, he went to Paris, where he worked as a graphic designer for Peter Knapp of Elle magazine. After becoming known and successful, he was hired away from Elle by Queen magazine in London as an art director. Hamilton soon realised his love for Paris, and after returning there, became the art director of Printemps, the city's largest department store. While Hamilton was still employed at Printemps, he began doing commercial photography, and the dreamy, grainy style of his images quickly brought him success.

His photographs were in demand by other magazines such as Réalités, Twen and Photo. By the end of the 1960s, all of Hamilton's photographs appeared to have been snapped through a hazy mist. His further successes included dozens of photographic books with combined sales well into the millions, five feature films, countless magazine displays, and museum and gallery exhibitions. His work was exhibited in every one of the first three years of The Photographers' Gallery, London, but was roundly condemned by photojournalist Euan Duff for its "cliched pictorial symbolism exploiting soft focus, pastel colours, country landscapes and old houses, old fashioned clothes, and even white doves to give a phoney impression of healthy food ad naturalness; they are a sort of wholemeal stoneground pornography," exhibited "because the gallery needs the money."

In December 1977, Images Gallery—a studio owned by Bob Persky at 11 East 57th Street in Manhattan—showed his photographs at the same time that Bilitis was released. At that time, art critic Gene Thornton wrote in The New York Times that they reveal "the kind of ideal that regularly was expressed in the great paintings of the past". Hamilton has said that his work looks for "the candor of a lost paradise". In his book, Contemporary Photographers, curator Christian Caujolle wrote that Hamilton worked only with two fixed devices: "a clear pictorial intention and a latent eroticism, ostensibly romantic but asking for trouble".

In 1995, Hamilton said that people "have made contradictions of nudity and purity, sensuality and innocence, grace and spontaneity. I try to harmonize them and that's my secret and the reason for my success". Besides depicting young women and girls, Hamilton composed photographs of flowers, men, landscapes, farm animals, pigeons, and still lifes of fresh fruit. Several of his photographs look like oil paintings. Most of his work gives the impression of timelessness because of the absence of cars, modern buildings, and advertisement boards. In 1976, Denise Couttès explained Hamilton's phenomenal success on page 6 of The Best of David Hamilton. His images, she wrote, "express escapism. People can only escape from the violence and cruelty of the modern world through dreams and nostalgia".

His soft focus style came back into fashion at Vogue, Elle, and other fashion magazines beginning around 2003. For twenty years Hamilton had befriended the Danish Mona Kristensen (born as Mona Ǿstergaard in 1949, June 20), a model in many of his early photobooks who made her screen debut in Bilitis. Later he married Gertrude Versyp, who co-designed The Age of Innocence,. They later divorced amicably. Hamilton divided his time between Saint-Tropez and Paris. He enjoyed a revival in popularity after 2005. In 2006, David Hamilton, a collection of captioned photographs, and Erotic Tales, which contains Hamilton's fictional short stories, were published. At the time of his death, Hamilton had another book in the works, a monograph about Montenegro. He was working with Jelica Bujić, who was his first and last photography assistant.

== Reception ==
Much of Hamilton's work depicted early-teen girls, often nude, and he was the subject of controversy, including child pornography allegations, similar to those which the work of Sally Mann and Jock Sturges have attracted. For moral reasons several of Hamilton's books were banned in South Africa. In the late 1990s, conservative Christian groups in America unsuccessfully protested against bookstores selling Hamilton's photography books. As Chris Warmoll, writing for The Guardian in 2005, commented, "Hamilton's photographs have long been at the forefront of the 'Is it art or pornography?' debate."

In 2005, a man in the UK was convicted for being in possession of 19,000 images of children, including photos by Hamilton. The images were found to have the lowest indecency rating. In response, Glenn Holland, Hamilton's spokesman, said: "We are deeply saddened and disappointed by this, as David is one of the most successful art photographers the world has ever known. His books have sold millions". In 2010, a man was convicted of Level 1 child pornography for owning four books, including Hamilton's The Age of Innocence as well as Still Time by Sally Mann, which he purchased from a bookstore in Walthamstow, London. His conviction was overturned on appeal in 2011, with the judge calling his conviction "very unfair" and criticising the Crown Prosecution Service (CPS) for prosecuting him. The judge concluded that "If the [CPS] wishes to test whether the pictures in the books are indecent, the right way to deal with the matter is by way of prosecuting the publisher or retailer—not the individual purchaser."

== Sexual assault allegations ==
On 22 October 2016, Thierry Ardisson, the host of the French talk-show Salut les Terriens! on TNT C8 channel, named Hamilton as the man who allegedly raped RTL presenter Flavie Flament. According to Flament, the acts were committed in 1987 when she was 13 years old, in Cap d'Agde, Hérault, Southern France. She mentions them in her novel La consolation, a romanticised story based on her purported life experiences. After Flament publicly identified Hamilton, the book led to him being accused of being a predatory paedophile. Flament's brother has called certain revelations in her book into question, though he also stated that at the time, Flavie complained of inappropriate behaviour by the photographer, resulting in her parents stopping Hamilton from continuing with her.

On 17 November 2016, the weekly L'Obs magazine published anonymous accounts by three other former models who claimed that Hamilton had sex with them when they were underage. Five days later, Hamilton issued a statement threatening legal action against his accusers. When contacted by the French press agency AFP, Hamilton declared that he was not to blame. "I didn't do anything wrong," he said, while claiming only that he took a portrait of Flament "29 or 30 years ago". Flament put the portrait on the cover of La consolation.

== Death ==
On the evening of 25 November 2016, Hamilton's cleaning lady entered his apartment at 41 Boulevard du Montparnasse in southern Paris and found him dead with a plastic bag over his head and medications close at hand. The postmortem identified asphyxiation as the cause of death. Suicide is the leading hypothesis in the investigation.

== Publications ==
=== Photo books ===
- Dreams of a Young Girl (1971)
- Sisters (1972)
- La Danse (1972)
- Galeria Old Home (1974, Private)
- The Best of David Hamilton (1976)
- Private Collection (1976)
- Bilitis (1977)
- Souvenirs (1978)
- The Young Girl (1978)
- Secret Garden (1980)
- Tender Cousins (1981)
- Silk Wind (1982)
- A Summer in St. Tropez (1983)
- Jun Miho (1983)
- Homage to Painting or Images (1984)
- Maiko Minami (1987)
- Venice (1989)
- Flowers (1990)
- Blooming Minayo: 28 September (1992)
- Twenty Five Years of an Artist (1993)
- The Fantasies of Girls (1994)
- The Age of Innocence (1995)
- Harem: Asami and Friends (1995)
- A Place In The Sun (1996)
- Holiday Snapshots (1999)
- David Hamilton (2006)
- Erotic Tales (2007)

=== Portfolios ===
- Souvenirs (1974)
- Flower Girls (1979)
- Shadows of a Summer (1979)
- The White Pebble (1980)
- The Great Silver Photography (1984)

== Films ==
- Bilitis (1977)
- Laura: Shadows of a Summer (1979)
- Tender Cousins (1980)
- A Summer in St. Tropez (1983)
- First Desires (1984)

== See also ==
- Balthus
- Ernst Hofbauer
- Sally Mann
- Graham Ovenden
- Jock Sturges
- John William Waterhouse
