= Jock Sturges =

American photographer (born 1947)

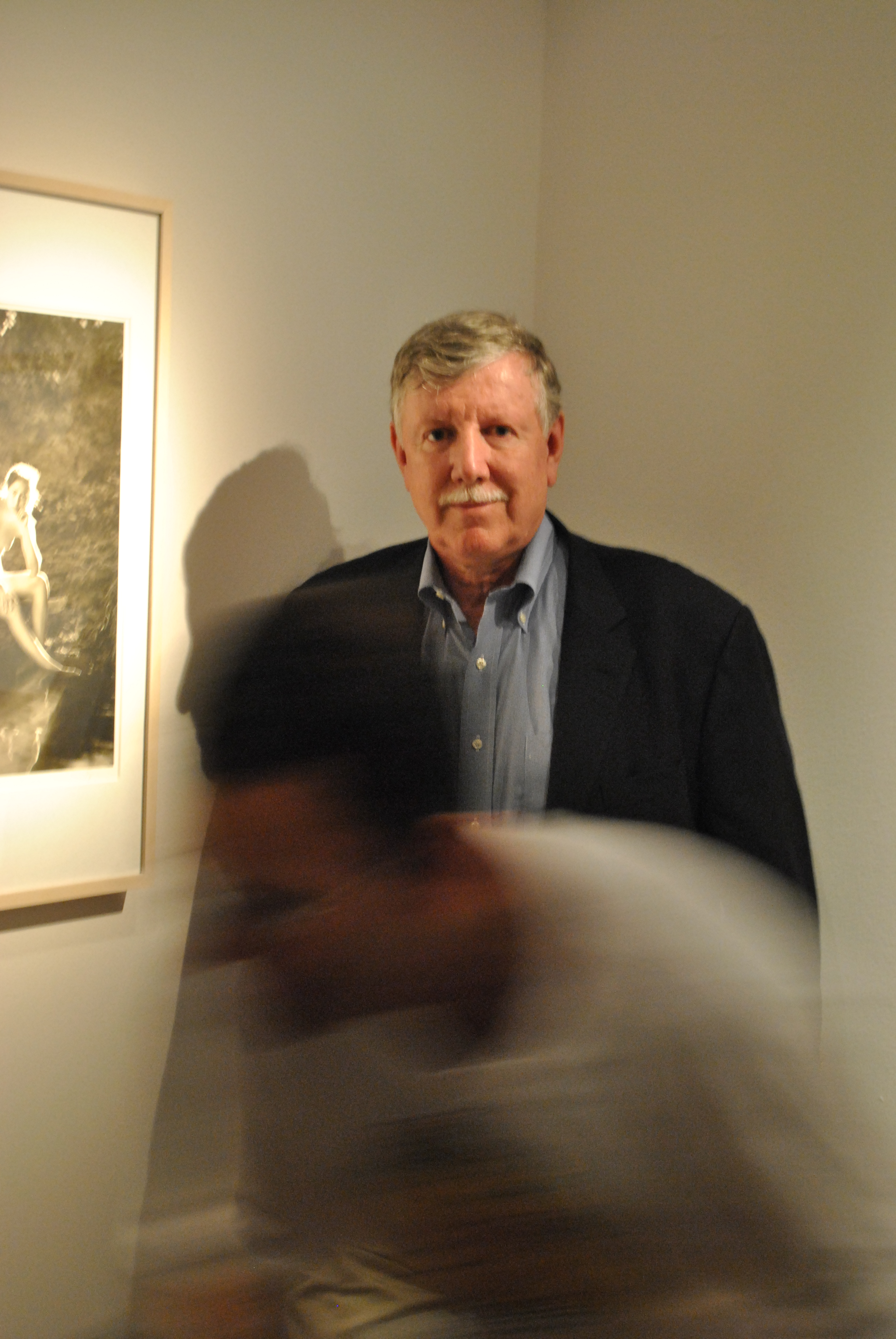
- Sturges in 2013
- Born: John Sturges; 1947 (age 78–79); New York City, New York, U.S.
- Education: Marlboro College (BFA); San Francisco Art Institute (MFA)
- Occupation: Photographer

John Sturges (/ˈstɜːrdʒɪs/; born 1947), known as Jock Sturges, is an American photographer and registered sex offender, best known for his images of nudist colony residents, particularly nude photos of prepubescent children and early adolescents with their parents in Gascogne France and Northern California.

== Early life and education ==
Sturges was born in 1947 in New York. From 1966 to 1970, he served in the United States Navy as a Russian linguist. He graduated with a BFA in Perceptual psychology and Photography from Marlboro College and received an MFA in photography from the San Francisco Art Institute.

== Career ==
His subjects are nude adolescents and their families, primarily taken at communes in Northern California and at the Atlantic-coast naturist resort CHM Montalivet in Vendays-Montalivet. Much of his work features California resident Misty Dawn, whom he shot from when she was a child until in her twenties.

Sturges primarily works with a large 8x10-inch-format view camera. He has taken some digital photographs but prefers to work with film.

His work has been the subject of controversy in the United States. In 1990, his San Francisco studio was raided by FBI agents and his equipment seized. A grand jury subsequently declined to bring an indictment against him. In 1998, unsuccessful attempts were made to have his books The Last Day of Summer and Radiant Identities classed as child pornography in Arkansas and Louisiana. Customers in Alabama and Tennessee sued Barnes & Noble for stocking the books, resulting in protests throughout the United States, largely inspired by conservative radio host Randall Terry.

His photographs appear as cover art on three novels by Jennifer McMahon, Promise Not to Tell, Island of Lost Girls and Dismantled, as well as Karl Ove Knausgård's 1998 debut novel Ute av verden (Out of the World). The band Ride used some of his photographs on different releases, i.e.: the Twisterella and Leave Them All Behind EPs.

== Personal life ==
In 2021, Sturges pleaded guilty in Franklin County (MA) Superior Court to an unnatural and lascivious act with a child under 16 when he was a dorm head at the Northfield Mount Hermon School in the mid-1970s. He was sentenced to three years' probation.

== Publications ==
=== Publications by Sturges ===
- The Last Day of Summer (1991, Aperture, NY), ISBN 0-89381-538-1
- Radiant Identities (1994, Aperture, NY)
- Evolution of Grace (1994, Gakken, Tokyo)
- Jock Sturges (1996, Scalo, Zürich)
- Jock Sturges: New Work, 1996–2000 (2000, Scalo, Zürich)
- Jock Sturges: Twenty-Five Years (2004, Paul Cava Fine Art, Bala Cynwyd, PA)
- Jock Sturges: Notes (2004, Aperture, NY)
- Misty Dawn: Portrait of a Muse (2008, Aperture, NY)
- Jock Sturges: Life Time (2008 Steidl)
- The Rollei Project (2013 Foto Henny Hoogeveen, Lisse, The Netherlands)
- Jock Sturges: Fanny (2014 Steidl)
- The Leica Project (2019 Foto Henny Hoogeveen, Lisse, The Netherlands)

=== Other noted publications include ===
- Montage (Graham Webb International)
- Standing on Water (1991, Catalogue of portfolio published by Paul Cava Fine Art, Philadelphia)
- Jock Sturges Color (Catalogue of portfolio published by Ataraxia, Bensalem)

== Films ==
- Line of Beauty and Grace (2007, Amadelio) – documentary
